= 1973 Pittsburgh Steelers season =

Pittsburgh Steelers 41st US football season

- Owner: Art Rooney
- Head coach: Chuck Noll
- Home stadium: Three Rivers Stadium

Results
- Record: 10–4
- Division place: 2nd AFC Central
- Playoffs: Lost Divisional Playoffs (at Raiders) 14–33
- All-Pros: 3: Joe Greene (1st team); Roy Gerela (2nd team); Jack Ham (2nd team)
- Pro Bowlers: 8: DT Joe Greene; DE L. C. Greenwood; LB Jack Ham; RB Franco Harris; LB Andy Russell; WR Ronnie Shanklin; G Bruce Van Dyke; DE Dwight White
- Team MVP: Ron Shanklin

The 1973 Pittsburgh Steelers season was the team's 41st season in the National Football League. The team finished second in the AFC Central division and qualified for the postseason for the second consecutive season. The Steelers got off to a terrific start winning eight of their first nine games. However, a costly three game losing streak would put their playoff hopes in jeopardy. The Steelers would recover to win their last two games, but had to settle for a Wild Card berth with a 10–4 record. The Steelers would lose in the playoffs to the Oakland Raiders 33–14 in Oakland.

The 1973 Steelers' pass defense is arguably the greatest in the history of the NFL. Their defensive passer rating—the quarterback passer rating of all opposing quarterbacks throughout the season—was 33.1, an NFL record for the Super Bowl era.

According to Cold Hard Football Facts:

Pittsburgh's pass-defense numbers that year were stunning. Opposing passers compiled the following stat-line:

- 164 of 359 (45.7%) for 1,923 yards, 5.36 [yards-per-attempt], 11 [touchdowns] and 37 [interceptions]

The figure that leaps screaming off the sheet is the amazing 37 picks in 14 games. The 2009 Jets, by comparison, allowed a puny 8 TDs in 16 games, but hauled in just 17 picks.

Pittsburgh's all-time best pass defense was an equal-opportunity unit: Mike Wagner led the team with 8 INT, but 10 other guys recorded at least one pick. Amazing. Eleven defenders boasted at least one INT for Pittsburgh that season. The entire starting secondary recorded 24 picks alone, and Hall of Fame cornerback Mel Blount was last on the list: Wagner (8), safety Glen Edwards (6), cornerback John Rowser (6) and Blount (4).

The campaign was chronicled in Roy Blount Jr.'s 1974 book About Three Bricks Shy of a Load. The source of its title was Craig Hanneman whose endearing description of himself and his teammates after the regular season away victory over the Oakland Raiders was "We’re all about three bricks shy of a load."

== Offseason ==
=== NFL draft ===
| Team | Rd | Pick | Name | Pos | College |
|---|---|---|---|---|---|
| PIT | 1 | 24 | J.T. Thomas | DB | Florida St. |
| PIT | 2 | 50 | Ken Phares | DB | Mississippi St. |
| PIT | 3 | 76 | Roger Bernhardt | G | Kansas |
| PIT | 4 | 102 | Gail Clark | LB | Michigan St. |
| PIT | 5 | 106 | Dave Reavis | T | Arkansas |
| PIT | 5 | 128 | Larry Clark | LB | Northern Illinois |
| PIT | 6 | 140 | Ron Bell | RB | Illinois St. |
| PIT | 6 | 154 | Glenn Scolnik | WR | Indiana |
| PIT | 7 | 180 | Nate Dorsey | WR | Miss Valley St. |
| PIT | 8 | 192 | Loren Toews | LB | California |
| PIT | 8 | 206 | Bill Janssen | T | Nebraska |
| PIT | 9 | 232 | Bracy Bonham | G | North Carolina Central |
| PIT | 10 | 258 | Don Wunderly | DT | Arkansas |
| PIT | 11 | 284 | Bob White | DB | Arizona |
| PIT | 12 | 310 | Willie Lee | RB | Indiana St. |
| PIT | 13 | 336 | Rick Fergerson | WR | Kansas St. |
| PIT | 14 | 362 | Roger Cowan | DE | Stanford |
| PIT | 15 | 388 | Charles Cross | DB | Iowa |
| PIT | 16 | 414 | Glen Nardi | DT | Navy |
| PIT | 17 | 440 | Mike Shannon | DT | Oregon St. |

== Personnel ==
=== Staff ===
1973 Pittsburgh Steelers staff
| Front office: President – Arthur J. Rooney; Vice president – John R. McGinley; Vice president – Daniel M. Rooney; Vice president – Arthur J. Rooney, Jr.; General Manager - Dick Haley; Public relations director – Ed Kiely; Traveling secretary – James A. Boston; Controller – Robert P. Quinn; Publicity director – Joe Gordon; Ticket manager – Joseph H. Carr; Director of player personnel – Dick Haley; Assistant director of player personnel – Bill Nunn; Director of professional scouting – V. Timothy Rooney; Head coaches: Head coach – Chuck Noll; Offensive coaches: Offensive line – Bob Fry; Offensive backfield – Dick Hoak; Quarterbacks – Babe Parilli; Receivers – Lionel Taylor | Defensive coaches: Defensive coordinator – Bud Carson; Defensive line – George Perles; Defensive assistant – Woody Widenhofer; Strength and conditioning: Strength – Louis Riecke; Flexibility – Paul Uram; Team physician, orthopedic – Dr. John Best; Team Physician, M.D. – Dr. David S. Huber; Team dentist – Dr. Robert Gray; Trainer – Ralph Berlin; Assistant trainer – Robert Milie; Equipment manager – Anthony Parisi; Field manager – Jack Hart |

=== Roster ===
1973 Pittsburgh Steelers roster
| Quarterbacks (QB): 12 Terry Bradshaw; 17 Joe Gilliam; Running backs (RB): 20 Rocky Bleier; 35 Steve Davis; 33 John Fuqua; 32 Franco Harris; 26 Preston Pearson; Wide receivers (WR): 85 Dave Davis; 43 Frank Lewis; 83 Barry Pearson; 82 Dave Williams; Tight ends (TE): 87 Larry Brown; 89 John McMakin | Offensive linemen (OL): 50 Jim Clack C; 57 Sam Davis G; 76 Glen Ray Hines T; 55 Jon Kolb T; 56 Ray Mansfield C; 72 Gerry Mullins G/T; 66 Bruce Van Dyke G; Defensive linemen (DL): 75 Joe Greene DT; 68 L. C. Greenwood DE; 67 Craig Hanneman DE; 63 Ernie Holmes DT; 74 Tom Keating DT; 78 Dwight White DE | Linebackers (LB): 38 Ed Bradley MLB; 53 Henry Davis MLB; 59 Jack Ham OLB; 34 Andy Russell OLB; 51 Loren Toews OLB; 90 George Webster OLB; Defensive backs (DB): 47 Mel Blount CB; 27 Glen Edwards FS; 41 Dennis Meyer SS; 48 John Rowser CB; 26 J. T. Thomas CB; 23 Mike Wagner SS; Special teams (ST): 10 Roy Gerela K; 39 Bobby Walden P | Practice squad: 29 John Dockery DB; 64 Steve Furness DT; 71 Gordon Gravelle T; -- Mike Haggard WR; 77 Melvin Holmes G; 21 Glenn Scolnik WR; Reserve: -- Chuck Dicus WR (IR); 5 Terry Hanratty QB (IR); -- Ken Phares CB/S (IR); 25 Ronnie Shanklin WR (IR); Rookies in italics 40 active, 4 reserve, 6 practice squad |

== Regular season ==
=== Schedule ===
| Week | Date | Opponent | Result | Record | Venue |
|---|---|---|---|---|---|
| 1 | September 16 | Detroit Lions | **W** 24–10 | 1–0 | Three Rivers Stadium |
| 2 | September 23 | **Cleveland Browns** | **W** 33–6 | 2–0 | Three Rivers Stadium |
| 3 | September 30 | at **Houston Oilers** | **W** 36–7 | 3–0 | Astrodome |
| 4 | October 7 | San Diego Chargers | **W** 38–21 | 4–0 | Three Rivers Stadium |
| 5 | October 14 | at **Cincinnati Bengals** | **L** 7–19 | 4–1 | Riverfront Stadium |
| 6 | October 21 | New York Jets | **W** 26–14 | 5–1 | Three Rivers Stadium * |
| 7 | October 28 | **Cincinnati Bengals** | **W** 20–13 | 6–1 | Three Rivers Stadium |
| 8 | November 5 | Washington Redskins | **W** 21–16 | 7–1 | Three Rivers Stadium |
| 9 | November 11 | at Oakland Raiders | **W** 17–9 | 8–1 | Oakland-Alameda County Coliseum |
| 10 | November 18 | Denver Broncos | **L** 13–23 | 8–2 | Three Rivers Stadium |
| 11 | November 25 | at **Cleveland Browns** | **L** 16–21 | 8–3 | Cleveland Municipal Stadium |
| 12 | December 3 | at Miami Dolphins | **L** 26–30 | 8–4 | Miami Orange Bowl |
| 13 | December 9 | **Houston Oilers** | **W** 33–7 | 9–4 | Three Rivers Stadium |
| 14 | December 15 | at San Francisco 49ers | **W** 37–14 | 10–4 | Candlestick Park |
Note: Intra-division opponents are in **bold** text.

- played at Pittsburgh because of World Series at Shea Stadium

=== Game summaries ===
==== Week 1 ====
Detroit Lions (0–0) at Pittsburgh Steelers (0–0)

| Quarter | 1 | 2 | 3 | 4 | Total |
|---|---|---|---|---|---|
| Lions | 0 | 0 | 10 | 0 | **10** |
| Steelers | 0 | 3 | 7 | 14 | **24** |

at Three Rivers Stadium, Pittsburgh, PA

- Date: September 16
- Game time: 4:00 p.m.
- Game weather: 64 °F (18 °C); wind 11 mph (18 km/h)
- Game attendance: 48,913
- Referee: Fred Wyant
- Pro-Football-Reference.com

Game information

Lions

- Greg Landry
  11/27, 219 Yds, TD, 3 INT
  8 Rush, 65 Yds
- Ron Jessie
  3 Rec, 131 Yds, TD

Steelers

- Terry Bradshaw
  15/23, 124 Yds, 2 TD, INT
- John Fuqua
  26 Rush, 100 Yds
- Barry Pearson
  6 Rec, 58 Yds

Scoring summary

| Quarter | Time | Drive | | | Team | Scoring information | Score | |
| Quarter | Time | Plays | Yards | TOP | Team | Scoring information | DET | PIT |
|---|---|---|---|---|---|---|---|---|
| 2 | | | | | Steelers | 11-yard field goal by Roy Gerela | 0 | 3 |
| 3 | | | | | Steelers | Bradshaw 1-yard touchdown run, Gerela kick good | 0 | 10 |
| 3 | | | | | Lions | Jessie 84-yard touchdown reception from Landry, Mann kick good | 7 | 10 |
| 3 | | | | | Lions | 40-yard field goal by Mann | 10 | 10 |
| 4 | | | | | Steelers | McMakin 24-yard touchdown reception from Bradshaw, Gerela kick good | 10 | 17 |
| 4 | | | | | Steelers | Shanklin 6-yard touchdown reception from Bradshaw, Gerela kick good | 10 | 24 |
| "TOP" = time of possession. For other American football terms, see Glossary of American football. | | | | | | | 10 | 24 |

==== Week 2 ====
Cleveland Browns (1–0) at Pittsburgh Steelers (1–0)

| Quarter | 1 | 2 | 3 | 4 | Total |
|---|---|---|---|---|---|
| Browns | 3 | 0 | 0 | 3 | **6** |
| Steelers | 10 | 6 | 10 | 7 | **33** |

at Three Rivers Stadium, Pittsburgh, Pennsylvania

- Date: September 23
- Game time: 1:00 p.m.
- Game weather: 68 °F (20 °C); wind 14 mph (23 km/h)
- Game attendance: 49,396
- Referee: Tommy Bell
- Pro-Football-Reference.com

Game information

Browns

- Mike Phipps
  15/29, 157 Yds, 3 INT
- Leroy Kelly
  13 Rush, 39 Yds
- Frank Pitts
  2 Rec, 33 Yds

Steelers

- Terry Bradshaw
  5/14, 140 Yds, TD, INT
- John Fuqua
  16 Rush, 80 Yds
- Frank Lewis
  3 Rec, 92 Yds, 2 TD

Scoring summary

| Quarter | Time | Drive | | | Team | Scoring information | Score | |
| Quarter | Time | Plays | Yards | TOP | Team | Scoring information | CLE | PIT |
|---|---|---|---|---|---|---|---|---|
| 1 | | | | | Steelers | 12-yard field goal by Gerela | 0 | 3 |
| 1 | | | | | Browns | 43-yard field goal by Cockroft | 3 | 3 |
| 1 | | | | | Steelers | Fuqua 4-yard touchdown run, Gerela kick good | 3 | 10 |
| 2 | | | | | Steelers | 40-yard field goal by Gerela | 3 | 13 |
| 2 | | | | | Steelers | 26-yard field goal by Gerela | 3 | 16 |
| 3 | | | | | Steelers | 44-yard field goal by Gerela | 3 | 19 |
| 4 | | | | | Steelers | Lewis 8-yard touchdown reception from Bradshaw, Gerela kick good | 3 | 26 |
| 4 | | | | | Browns | 28-yard field goal by Cockroft | 6 | 26 |
| 4 | | | | | Steelers | Lewis 53-yard touchdown reception from Hanratty, Gerela kick good | 6 | 33 |
| "TOP" = time of possession. For other American football terms, see Glossary of American football. | | | | | | | 6 | 33 |

==== Week 3 ====
Pittsburgh Steelers (2–0) at Houston Oilers (0–2)

| Quarter | 1 | 2 | 3 | 4 | Total |
|---|---|---|---|---|---|
| Steelers | 3 | 3 | 13 | 17 | **36** |
| Oilers | 0 | 7 | 0 | 0 | **7** |

at Astrodome, Houston, Texas

- Date: September 30
- Game time: 2:00 p.m.
- Game weather: Indoors (dome)
- Game attendance: 39,331
- Referee: Jim Tunney
- Pro-Football-Reference.com

Game information

Steelers

- Terry Bradshaw
  9/17, 159 Yds, TD, 2 INT
- John Fuqua
  13 Rush, 48 Yds
- Frank Lewis
  1 Rec, 44 Yds

Oilers

- Dan Pastorini
  14/25, 87 Yds, TD, 2 INT
- Bob Gresham
  14 Rush, 41 Yds
- Billy Parks
  7 Rec, 80 Yds

Scoring summary

| Quarter | Time | Drive | | | Team | Scoring information | Score | |
| Quarter | Time | Plays | Yards | TOP | Team | Scoring information | PIT | HOU |
|---|---|---|---|---|---|---|---|---|
| 1 | | | | | Steelers | 20-yard field goal by Gerela | 3 | 0 |
| 2 | | | | | Oilers | Alston 7-yard touchdown reception from Pastorini, Butler kick good | 3 | 7 |
| 2 | | | | | Steelers | 47-yard field goal by Gerela | 6 | 7 |
| 3 | | | | | Steelers | Bradshaw 1-yard touchdown run, Gerela kick no good | 12 | 7 |
| 3 | | | | | Steelers | Interception returned 45 yards for touchdown by Russell, Gerela kick good | 19 | 7 |
| 4 | | | | | Steelers | Shanklin 26-yard touchdown reception from Bradshaw, Gerela kick good | 26 | 7 |
| 4 | | | | | Steelers | 26-yard field goal by Gerela | 29 | 7 |
| 4 | | | | | Steelers | Interception returned 86 yards for touchdown by Edwards, Gerela kick good | 36 | 7 |
| "TOP" = time of possession. For other American football terms, see Glossary of American football. | | | | | | | 36 | 7 |

==== Week 4 ====
San Diego Chargers (1–2) at Pittsburgh Steelers (3–0)

| Quarter | 1 | 2 | 3 | 4 | Total |
|---|---|---|---|---|---|
| Chargers | 0 | 0 | 0 | 21 | **21** |
| Steelers | 17 | 21 | 0 | 0 | **38** |

at Three Rivers Stadium • Pittsburgh, Pennsylvania

- Date: October 7
- Game time: 1:00 p.m.
- Game weather: 60 °F (16 °C) • Wind 7 mph (11 km/h)
- Game attendance: 48,795
- Referee: Pat Haggerty
- Pro-Football-Reference

Game information

Chargers

- Dan Fouts
  11/21, 174 Yds, TD, INT
- Cid Edwards
  13 Rush, 94 Yds
- Clint Jones
  2 Rec, 51 Yds

Steelers

- Terry Bradshaw
  7/16, 99 Yds, TD, INT
- Preston Pearson
  6 Rush, 64 Yds
- Frank Lewis
  4 Rec, 61 Yds

Johnny Unitas playing for San Diego is knocked out of the game after completing only 3 of 15 passes for 24 yards and three interceptions.

Scoring summary

| Quarter | Time | Drive | | | Team | Scoring information | Score | |
| Quarter | Time | Plays | Yards | TOP | Team | Scoring information | SD | PIT |
|---|---|---|---|---|---|---|---|---|
| 1 | | | | | Steelers | Shanklin 12-yard touchdown reception from Bradshaw, Gerela kick good | 0 | 7 |
| 1 | | | | | Steelers | Bradshaw 1-yard touchdown run, Gerela kick good | 0 | 14 |
| 1 | | | | | Steelers | 38-yard field goal by Gerela | 0 | 17 |
| 2 | | | | | Steelers | Davis 1-yard touchdown run, Gerela kick good | 0 | 24 |
| 2 | | | | | Steelers | Blocked punt recovered in end zone for touchdown by Wagner, Gerela kick good | 0 | 31 |
| 3 | | | | | Steelers | Shanklin 37-yard touchdown reception from Hanratty, Gerela kick good | 0 | 38 |
| 4 | | | | | Chargers | LeVias 13-yard touchdown reception from Fouts, Wersching kick good | 7 | 38 |
| 4 | | | | | Chargers | Jones 3-yard touchdown run, Wersching kick good | 14 | 38 |
| 4 | | | | | Chargers | Holmes 1-yard touchdown run, Wersching kick good | 21 | 38 |
| "TOP" = time of possession. For other American football terms, see Glossary of American football. | | | | | | | 21 | 38 |

==== Week 5 ====
Pittsburgh Steelers (4–0) at Cincinnati Bengals (2–2)

| Quarter | 1 | 2 | 3 | 4 | Total |
|---|---|---|---|---|---|
| Steelers | 0 | 0 | 0 | 7 | **7** |
| Bengals | 6 | 3 | 7 | 3 | **19** |

at Riverfront Stadium • Cincinnati, Ohio

- Date: October 14
- Game time: 1:00 p.m.
- Game weather: 59 °F (15 °C) • Wind 8 mph (13 km/h)
- Game attendance: 55,819
- Referee: Dick Jorgensen
- Pro-Football-Reference.com

Game information

Steelers

- Terry Bradshaw
  9/14, 106 Yds, INT
- Preston Pearson
  12 Rush, 39 Yds, TD
- Ron Shanklin
  1 Rec, 67 Yds

Bengals

- Ken Anderson
  9/21, 78 Yds
- Boobie Clark
  28 Rush, 112 Yds, TD
- Isaac Curtis
  3 Rec, 46 Yds

Scoring summary

| Quarter | Time | Drive | | | Team | Scoring information | Score | |
| Quarter | Time | Plays | Yards | TOP | Team | Scoring information | PIT | CIN |
|---|---|---|---|---|---|---|---|---|
| 1 | | | | | Bengals | 20-yard field goal by Muhlmann | 0 | 3 |
| 1 | | | | | Bengals | 19-yard field goal by Muhlmann | 0 | 6 |
| 2 | | | | | Bengals | 20-yard field goal by Muhlmann | 0 | 9 |
| 3 | | | | | Bengals | Clark 3-yard touchdown run, Muhlmann kick good | 0 | 16 |
| 4 | | | | | Bengals | 41-yard field goal by Muhlmann | 0 | 19 |
| 4 | | | | | Steelers | Pearson 1-yard touchdown run, Gerela kick good | 7 | 19 |
| "TOP" = time of possession. For other American football terms, see Glossary of American football. | | | | | | | 7 | 19 |

==== Week 6 ====
New York Jets (2–3) at Pittsburgh Steelers (4–1)

| Quarter | 1 | 2 | 3 | 4 | Total |
|---|---|---|---|---|---|
| Jets | 7 | 7 | 0 | 0 | **14** |
| Steelers | 0 | 9 | 3 | 14 | **26** |

at Three Rivers Stadium • Pittsburgh, Pennsylvania

- Date: October 21
- Game time: 1:00 p.m. EDT
- Game weather: 50 °F (10 °C) • Wind 9 mph (14 km/h)
- Game attendance: 48,682
- Referee: John McDonough
- Pro-Football-Reference.com

Game information

Jets

- Bill Demory
  6/15, 84 Yds, TD, 3 INT
- John Riggins
  15 Rush, 42 Yds, TD
- Rich Caster
  1 Rec, 28 Yds, TD

Steelers

- Terry Bradshaw
  8/18, 119 Yds, INT
- Franco Harris
  25 Rush, 102 Yds, TD
- Ron Shanklin
  3 Rec, 68 Yds, TD

Scoring summary

| Quarter | Time | Drive | | | Team | Scoring information | Score | |
| Quarter | Time | Plays | Yards | TOP | Team | Scoring information | NYJ | PIT |
|---|---|---|---|---|---|---|---|---|
| 1 | | | | | Jets | Riggins 1-yard touchdown run, Howfield kick good | 7 | 0 |
| 2 | | | | | Steelers | 27-yard field goal by Gerela | 7 | 3 |
| 2 | | | | | Steelers | 29-yard field goal by Gerela | 7 | 6 |
| 2 | | | | | Jets | Caster 28-yard touchdown reception from Demory, Howfield kick good | 14 | 6 |
| 2 | | | | | Steelers | 36-yard field goal by Gerela | 14 | 9 |
| 3 | | | | | Steelers | 13-yard field goal by Gerela | 14 | 12 |
| 4 | | | | | Steelers | Shanklin 16-yard touchdown reception from Hanratty, Gerela kick good | 14 | 19 |
| 4 | | | | | Steelers | Harris 2-yard touchdown run, Gerela kick good | 14 | 26 |
| "TOP" = time of possession. For other American football terms, see Glossary of American football. | | | | | | | 14 | 26 |

==== Week 7 vs Bengals ====
Cincinnati Bengals (4–2) at Pittsburgh Steelers (5–1)

| Quarter | 1 | 2 | 3 | 4 | Total |
|---|---|---|---|---|---|
| Bengals | 0 | 6 | 0 | 7 | **13** |
| Steelers | 3 | 7 | 10 | 0 | **20** |

at Three Rivers Stadium • Pittsburgh, Pennsylvania

- Date: October 28
- Game time: 4:00 p.m. EDT
- Game weather: 52 °F (11 °C) • Wind 12 miles per hour (19 km/h; 10 kn)
- Game attendance: 45,761
- Referee: Norm Schachter
- Pro-Football-Reference.com

Game information

Bengals

- Ken Anderson
  20/38, 230 Yds, TD, 3 INT
- Boobie Clark
  15 Rush, 60 Yds
  10 Rec, 68 Yds

Steelers

- Terry Hanratty
  4/7, 127 Yds, TD, INT
- Franco Harris
  21 Rush, 43 Yds
- Ron Shanklin
  3 Rec, 104 Yds, TD

Scoring summary

| Quarter | Time | Drive | | | Team | Scoring information | Score | |
| Quarter | Time | Plays | Yards | TOP | Team | Scoring information | CIN | PIT |
|---|---|---|---|---|---|---|---|---|
| 1 | | | | | Steelers | 15-yard field goal by Roy Gerela | 0 | 3 |
| 2 | | | | | Bengals | 17-yard field goal by Horst Muhlmann | 3 | 3 |
| 2 | | | | | Bengals | 41-yard field goal by Horst Muhlmann | 6 | 3 |
| 2 | | | | | Steelers | Ron Shanklin 51-yard touchdown reception from Terry Hanratty, Roy Gerela kick good | 6 | 10 |
| 3 | | | | | Steelers | 18-yard field goal by Roy Gerela | 6 | 13 |
| 3 | | | | | Steelers | John Fuqua 1-yard touchdown run, Roy Gerela kick good | 6 | 20 |
| 4 | | | | | Bengals | Essex Johnson 16-yard touchdown reception from Ken Anderson, Horst Muhlmann kick good | 13 | 20 |
| "TOP" = time of possession. For other American football terms, see Glossary of American football. | | | | | | | 13 | 20 |

==== Week 8 vs Washington Redskins ====
Washington Redskins (5–2) at Pittsburgh Steelers (6–1)

| Quarter | 1 | 2 | 3 | 4 | Total |
|---|---|---|---|---|---|
| Redskins | 3 | 3 | 3 | 7 | **16** |
| Steelers | 7 | 7 | 0 | 7 | **21** |

at Three Rivers Stadium • Pittsburgh, Pennsylvania

- Date: Monday, November 5
- Game time: 9:00 p.m. EDT
- Game weather: 40 °F (4 °C) • Wind 13 miles per hour (21 km/h; 11 kn)
- Game attendance: 49,220
- Referee: Tommy Bell
- TV announcers (ABC): Frank Gifford, Howard Cosell, and Don Meredith
- Pro-Football-Reference.com

Game information

Redskins

- Billy Kilmer
  9/22, 76 Yds, TD, 2 INT
- Charley Harraway
  13 Rush, 63 Yds
- Jerry Smith
  4 Rec, 34 Yds

Steelers

- Joe Gilliam
  3/10, 71 Yds, TD, 2 INT
- Franco Harris
  25 Rush, 90 Yds
- Barry Pearson
  2 Rec, 57 Yds, TD

Joe Gilliam makes Monday Night Football debut

Scoring summary

| Quarter | Time | Drive | | | Team | Scoring information | Score | |
| Quarter | Time | Plays | Yards | TOP | Team | Scoring information | WSH | PIT |
|---|---|---|---|---|---|---|---|---|
| 1 | | | | | Redskins | 30-yard field goal by Curt Knight | 3 | 0 |
| 1 | | | | | Steelers | Preston Pearson 7-yard touchdown reception from Terry Hanratty, Roy Gerela kick good | 3 | 7 |
| 2 | | | | | Redskins | 12-yard field goal by Curt Knight | 6 | 7 |
| 2 | | | | | Steelers | Ron Shanklin 24-yard touchdown reception from Terry Hanratty, Roy Gerela kick good | 6 | 14 |
| 3 | | | | | Redskins | 16-yard field goal by Curt Knight | 9 | 14 |
| 4 | | | | | Steelers | Barry Pearson 46-yard touchdown reception from Joe Gilliam, Roy Gerela kick good | 9 | 21 |
| 4 | | | | | Redskins | Larry Brown 17-yard touchdown reception from Billy Kilmer, Curt Knight kick good | 16 | 21 |
| "TOP" = time of possession. For other American football terms, see Glossary of American football. | | | | | | | 16 | 21 |

==== Week 9 at Raiders ====
Pittsburgh Steelers (7–1) at Oakland Raiders (5–2–1)

| Quarter | 1 | 2 | 3 | 4 | Total |
|---|---|---|---|---|---|
| Steelers | 0 | 7 | 7 | 3 | **17** |
| Raiders | 0 | 3 | 0 | 6 | **9** |

at Oakland–Alameda County Coliseum • Oakland, California

- Date: November 11
- Game time: 4:00 p.m. EDT
- Game weather: 62 °F (17 °C) • Wind 16 miles per hour (26 km/h; 14 kn)
- Game attendance: 47,535
- Referee: Bernie Ulman
- Pro-Football-Reference.com

Game information

Steelers

- Terry Hanratty
  6/19, 86 Yds, TD, INT
- Franco Harris
  20 Rush, 77 Yds, TD
- Ron Shanklin
  2 Rec, 41 Yds, TD

Raiders

- Daryle Lamonica
  13/31, 236 Yds, TD, 4 INT
- Charlie Smith
  13 Rush, 74 Yds
- Fred Biletnikoff
  4 Rec, 105 Yds, TD

Scoring summary

| Quarter | Time | Drive | | | Team | Scoring information | Score | |
| Quarter | Time | Plays | Yards | TOP | Team | Scoring information | PIT | OAK |
|---|---|---|---|---|---|---|---|---|
| 2 | | | | | Steelers | Ron Shanklin 14-yard touchdown reception from Terry Hanratty, Roy Gerela kick good | 7 | 0 |
| 2 | | | | | Raiders | 40-yard field goal by George Blanda | 7 | 3 |
| 3 | | | | | Steelers | Franco Harris 1-yard touchdown run, Roy Gerela kick good | 14 | 3 |
| 4 | | | | | Steelers | 17-yard field goal by Roy Gerela | 17 | 3 |
| 4 | | | | | Raiders | Fred Biletnikoff 27-yard touchdown reception from Daryle Lamonica, George Blanda kick no good | 17 | 9 |
| "TOP" = time of possession. For other American football terms, see Glossary of American football. | | | | | | | 17 | 9 |

==== Week 10 vs Broncos ====
Week Ten: Denver Broncos (4–3–2) at Pittsburgh Steelers (8–1)

| Quarter | 1 | 2 | 3 | 4 | Total |
|---|---|---|---|---|---|
| **Broncos** | 3 | 3 | 7 | 10 | **23** |
| Steelers | 3 | 3 | 0 | 7 | **13** |

at Three Rivers Stadium, Pittsburgh, Pennsylvania

- Date: November 18, 1973
- Game time: 1:00 p.m.
- Game weather: 35 °F (2 °C)
- Game attendance: 48,580
- Referee: Fred Silva
- Box Score

| Team | Category | Player | Statistics |
|---|---|---|---|
| Broncos | Passing | Charley Johnson | 13/20, 86 Yds, TD |
| Broncos | Rushing | Floyd Little | 27 Rush, 88 Yds, TD |
| Broncos | Receiving | Riley Odoms | 6 Rec, 47 Yds, TD |
| Steelers | Passing | Terry Hanratty | 10/19, 217 Yds, TD |
| Steelers | Rushing | Franco Harris | 11 Rush, 53 Yds |
| Steelers | Receiving | John McMakin | 3 Rec, 64 Yds |

Scoring summary

| Quarter | Time | Drive | | | Team | Scoring information | Score | |
| Quarter | Time | Plays | Yards | TOP | Team | Scoring information | DEN | PIT |
|---|---|---|---|---|---|---|---|---|
| 1 | | | | | Broncos | 32-yard field goal by Jim Turner | 3 | 0 |
| 1 | | | | | Steelers | 15-yard field goal by Roy Gerela | 3 | 3 |
| 2 | | | | | Steelers | 13-yard field goal by Roy Gerela | 3 | 6 |
| 2 | | | | | Broncos | 11-yard field goal by Jim Turner | 6 | 6 |
| 3 | | | | | Broncos | Floyd Little 10-yard touchdown run, Jim Turner kick good | 13 | 6 |
| 4 | | | | | Steelers | Ron Shanklin 42-yard touchdown reception from Terry Hanratty, Roy Gerela kick good | 13 | 13 |
| 4 | | | | | Broncos | 46-yard field goal by Jim Turner | 16 | 13 |
| 4 | | | | | Broncos | Riley Odoms 2-yard touchdown reception from Charley Johnson, Jim Turner kick good | 23 | 13 |
| "TOP" = time of possession. For other American football terms, see Glossary of American football. | | | | | | | 23 | 13 |

==== Week 11 ====
| Team | 1 | 2 | 3 | 4 | Total |
|---|---|---|---|---|---|
| Steelers | 7 | 3 | 3 | 3 | 16 |
| • Browns | 7 | 7 | 0 | 7 | 21 |

- Date: November 25
- Location: Cleveland Municipal Stadium, Cleveland, Ohio
- Game start: 1:00 p.m.
- Game attendance: 67,773
- Game weather: 50 F, wind 15 mph (24 km/h)
- Referee: Jim Tunney

===== Game summary =====
Scoring drives:

- Pittsburgh – Shanklin 9 pass from Gilliam (Gerela kick) – Steelers 7–0
- Cleveland – Phipps 1 run (Cockroft kick) – Tie 7–7
- Cleveland – Pruitt 15 pass from Phipps (Cockroft kick) – Browns 14-7
- Pittsburgh – FG Gerela 24 – Browns 14-10
- Pittsburgh – FG Gerela 14 – Browns 14-13
- Pittsburgh – FG Gerela 20 – Steelers 16–14
- Cleveland – Pruitt 19 run (Cockroft kick) – Browns 21–16

==== Week 12 (Monday December 3, 1973): at Miami Dolphins ====
| Team | 1 | 2 | 3 | 4 | Total |
|---|---|---|---|---|---|
| Steelers | 0 | 3 | 7 | 16 | 26 |
| • Dolphins | 20 | 10 | 0 | 0 | 30 |

- Date: Monday, December 3
- Location: Miami Orange Bowl, Miami, Florida
- Game start: 9:00 p.m.
- Game attendance: 68,901
- Game weather: 75 F, wind 14 mph (23 km/h)
- Referee: Ben Dreith
- TV announcers (ABC): Frank Gifford, Howard Cosell, and Don Meredith

===== Game summary =====
Scoring drives:

- Miami – Anderson 27 interception return (Yepremian kick) – Dolphins 7–0
- Miami – FG Yepremian 28 – Dolphins 10–0
- Miami – FG Yepremian 46 – Dolphins 13–0
- Miami – Mandich 2 pass from Griese (Yepremian kick) – Dolphins 20–0
- Miami – Anderson 38 interception return (Yepremian kick) – Dolphins 27–0
- Pittsburgh – FG Gerela 37 – Dolphins 27–3
- Miami – FG Yepremian 14 – Dolphins 30–3
- Pittsburgh – P. Pearson 5 pass from Bradshaw (Gerela kick) – Dolphins 30–10
- Pittsburgh – Harris 21 run (Gerela kick) – Dolphins 30–17
- Pittsburgh – B. Pearson 17 pass from Bradshaw (Gerela kick) – Dolphins 30–24
- Pittsburgh – Safety, White tackled Griese in end zone – Dolphins 30–26

==== Week 13 ====
| Team | 1 | 2 | 3 | 4 | Total |
|---|---|---|---|---|---|
| Oilers | 7 | 0 | 0 | 0 | 7 |
| • Steelers | 3 | 14 | 10 | 6 | 33 |

- Date: December 9
- Location: Three Rivers Stadium, Pittsburgh, Pennsylvania
- Game start: 1:00 p.m.
- Game attendance: 38,004
- Game weather: 34 F, wind 10 mph (16 km/h)
- Referee: Bob Frederic

===== Game summary =====
Scoring drives:

- Pittsburgh – FG Gerela 49 – Steelers 3–0
- Houston – Alston 11 pass from Pastorini (Butler kick) – Oilers 7–3
- Pittsburgh – B. Pearson 15 pass from Bradshaw (Gerela kick) – Steelers 10–7
- Pittsburgh – Steve Davis 3 pass from Bradshaw (Gerela kick) – Steelers 17–7
- Pittsburgh – FG Gerela 31 – Steelers 20–7
- Pittsburgh – Ham recovered fumble in end zone (Gerela kick) – Steelers 27–7
- Pittsburgh – FG Gerela 20 – Steelers 30–7
- Pittsburgh – FG Gerela 42 – Steelers 33–7

==== Week 14 ====
| Team | 1 | 2 | 3 | 4 | Total |
|---|---|---|---|---|---|
| • Steelers | 7 | 7 | 13 | 10 | 37 |
| 49ers | 0 | 7 | 0 | 7 | 14 |

- Date: December 15
- Location: Candlestick Park, San Francisco, California
- Game start: 4:00 p.m.
- Game attendance: 52,252
- Game weather: 47 F, wind 5 mph (8.0 km/h)
- Referee: Tommy Bell

===== Game summary =====
John Brodie's number 12 was retired prior to game.

Scoring drives:

- Pittsburgh – Rowser 71 interception return (Gerela kick) – Steelers 7–0
- San Francisco – Hall recovered blocked punt in end zone (Gossett kick) – Tie 7–7
- Pittsburgh – P. Pearson 1 run (Gerela kick) – Steelers 14–7
- Pittsburgh – FG Gerela 27 – Steelers 17–7
- Pittsburgh – FG Gerela 27 – Steelers 20–7
- Pittsburgh – Lewis 50 pass from Bradshaw (Gerela kick) – Steelers 27–7
- Pittsburgh – FG Gerela 35 – Steelers 30–7
- Pittsburgh – Steve Davis 1 run (Gerela kick) – Steelers 37–7
- San Francisco – Atkins 3 run (Gossett kick) – Steelers 37–14

=== Standings ===
AFC Central
| | W | L | T | PCT | DIV | CONF | PF | PA | STK |
|---|---|---|---|---|---|---|---|---|---|
| Cincinnati Bengals | 10 | 4 | 0 | .714 | 4–2 | 8–3 | 286 | 231 | W6 |
| Pittsburgh Steelers | 10 | 4 | 0 | .714 | 4–2 | 7–4 | 347 | 210 | W2 |
| Cleveland Browns | 7 | 5 | 2 | .571 | 4–2 | 6–3–2 | 234 | 255 | L2 |
| Houston Oilers | 1 | 13 | 0 | .071 | 0–6 | 1–10 | 199 | 447 | L6 |

== Postseason ==
=== AFC Divisional: @ Oakland Raiders ===
| Team | 1 | 2 | 3 | 4 | Total |
|---|---|---|---|---|---|
| Steelers | 0 | 7 | 0 | 7 | 14 |
| • Raiders | 7 | 3 | 13 | 10 | 33 |

- Date: Saturday, December 22
- Location: Oakland–Alameda County Coliseum, Oakland, California
- Game start: 4 p.m. EST
- Game attendance: 52,646
- Game weather: 50 F, wind 11 mph (18 km/h)
- Referee: Pat Haggerty
- TV announcers (NBC): Jim Simpson and Kyle Rote

==== Scoring Drives ====
- Oakland – Hubbard 1 run (Blanda kick) – Raiders 7–0
- Oakland – FG Blanda 25 – Raiders 10–0
- Pittsburgh – B. Pearson 4 pass from Bradshaw (Gerela kick) – Raiders 10–7
- Oakland – FG Blanda 31 – Raiders 13–7
- Oakland – FG Blanda 22 – Raiders 16–7
- Oakland – Brown 54 interception return (Blanda kick) – Raiders 23–7
- Oakland – FG Blanda 10 – Raiders 26–7
- Pittsburgh – Lewis 26 pass from Bradshaw (Gerela kick) – Raiders 26–14
- Oakland – Hubbard 1 run (Blanda kick) – Raiders 33–14
