= 1973 Houston Oilers season =

NFL team season

- Owner: Bud Adams
- General manager: Sid Gillman
- Head coach: Bill Peterson and Sid Gillman
- Home stadium: Houston Astrodome

Results
- Record: 1–13
- Division place: 4th AFC Central
- Playoffs: Did not qualify
- Pro Bowlers: DE Elvin Bethea

The 1973 Houston Oilers season was their fourth season in the National Football League and their 14th in competition overall. The team matched their previous season output of 1–13, and they missed the playoffs for the fourth consecutive season. Their eighteen consecutive losses after winning the third game in 1972 was an NFL record beaten only by the expansion Tampa Bay Buccaneers in 1976 and 1977, the Detroit Lions from the last game of 2007 until the third game of 2009, and the Jacksonville Jaguars from 2020 to 2021.

Coach Bill Peterson left the team after a 0–5 start and was replaced by coaching veteran Sid Gillman, who went 1–8 to finish the season. Peterson finished his NFL coaching career with a 1–18 record. The one win is the fewest for any head coach in NFL history. The Oilers’ offense struggled in 1973, ranking last in rushing yards (1388), second worst in yards per play (3.9), and third worst in both total yards (3307) and first downs (tied at 193).

The 1973 Oilers had one of the worst defenses of all time, statistically; they gave up 447 points during the season, the most ever for a 14-game season in the merger era (1970–1977). Only three teams gave up more points in a 14-game season: the 1966 Giants, the 1963 Broncos, and the 1961 Raiders. Their point-differential of −248 points was the worst in the league that year, and remains one of the ten worst in NFL history. (The second-worst team, the Philadelphia Eagles, gave up 393 points, or 3.8 fewer points per game.) Houston also gave up a league-high 26 touchdown passes in 1973.

They are also the most recent franchise in the NFL to have back-to-back one-win seasons; in fact since 1974 not a single NFL franchise again suffered multiple one- or no-win seasons in a non-strike season, until the Cleveland Browns did so in 2016 and 2017. Since the NFL developed a uniform schedule in 1936, the only other time a franchise has had back-to-back one-win seasons has been the 1949 and 1950 Baltimore Colts.

== Offseason ==
=== NFL draft ===
1973 Houston Oilers draft
Round	Pick	Player	Position	College	Notes
1	1	John Matuszak	Defensive end	Tampa	
1	14	George Amundson	Running back	Iowa State	
4	79	Gregg Bingham	Linebacker	Purdue	
5	105	Edesel Garrison	Wide receiver	USC	
6	131	Ron Mayo	Tight end	Morgan State	
7	157	Shelby Jordan	Offensive tackle	Washington University in St. Louis	
8	183	Joe Blahak	Free safety	Nebraska	
9	209	Mark Williams	Kicker	Rice	
10	235	Darrell Vaughn	Defensive tackle	Northern Colorado	
11	261	Larry Eaglin	Defensive back	Stephen F. Austin	
12	287	Brad Lyman	Wide receiver	UCLA	
13	313	Willie Martin	Guard	Northeastern State (Oklahoma)	
14	339	Ron Lou	Center	Arizona State	
15	365	Roger Goree	Linebacker	Baylor	
16	391	Tim Dameron	Wide receiver	East Carolina	
17	417	Randy Braband	Linebacker	Texas	
Made roster

== Roster ==
1973 Houston Oilers roster
Quarterbacks (QB): 10 Lynn Dickey; 14 Edd Hargett; 7 Dan Pastorini P; Running backs (RB): 12 George Amundson; 36 Bob Gresham; 40 Lewis Jolley; 18 Paul Robinson; 28 Bill Thomas; 44 Fred Willis; Wide receivers (WR): 00 Ken Burrough; 87 Eddie Hinton; 20 Billy Parks; Tight ends (TE): 82 Mack Alston; 80 Ron Mayo	Offensive linemen (OL): 63 Levert Carr T; 75 Elbert Drungo T; 69 Solomon Freelon G; 66 Tom Funchess T; 68 Brian Goodman G; 57 Sam Gruneisen C; 52 Calvin Hunt C; 72 Kevin Hunt T; 60 Al Jenkins G; Defensive linemen (DL): 65 Elvin Bethea DE; 76 Al Cowlings DT; 79 Jim Dunaway DT; 67 Mike Fanucci DE; 71 Wes Grant DE; 78 John Matuszak DT; 91 Greg Sampson DT; 70 Tody Smith DE; 73 Vernon Vanoy DT	Linebackers (LB): 54 Gregg Bingham MLB; 55 Ralph Cindrich OLB; 49 Dick Cunningham MLB; 58 Paul Guidry OLB; 59 Brian McConnell OLB; 56 Guy Roberts OLB; Defensive backs (DB): 19 Willie Alexander CB; 48 Bob Atkins FS; 27 Joe Blahak SS; 26 Larry Eaglin CB/S; 15 Al Johnson FS; 33 Benny Johnson CB; 22 Zeke Moore CB; 37 Jeff Severson SS/FS; Special teams (ST): 2 Skip Butler K/P	Reserve: 25 John Charles SS (IR); 50 Bill Curry C (IR); -- James Ford RB (IR); 13 Alvin Haymond S (IR); 61 Harris Jones G (IR); 51 Ron Lou C (IR); 62 Ralph Miller G (IR); 34 Willie Rodgers RB (IR); 64 Ron Saul G (IR); 77 Sid Smith (IR); Rookies in italics

== Schedule ==
Week	Date	Opponent	Result	Record	Venue	Attendance
1	September 16	at New York Giants	**L** 14–34	0–1	Yankee Stadium	57,979
2	September 23	at **Cincinnati Bengals**	**L** 10–24	0–2	Riverfront Stadium	51,823
3	September 30	**Pittsburgh Steelers**	**L** 7–36	0–3	Astrodome	39,331
4	October 7	Los Angeles Rams	**L** 26–31	0–4	Astrodome	34,875
5	October 14	Denver Broncos	**L** 20–48	0–5	Astrodome	32,801
6	October 21	at **Cleveland Browns**	**L** 13–42	0–6	Cleveland Municipal Stadium	61,146
7	October 28	at Chicago Bears	**L** 14–35	0–7	Soldier Field	43,755
8	November 4	at Baltimore Colts	**W** 31–27	1–7	Memorial Stadium	52,707
9	November 11	**Cleveland Browns**	**L** 13–23	1–8	Astrodome	37,230
10	November 18	at Kansas City Chiefs	**L** 14–38	1–9	Arrowhead Stadium	68,444
11	November 25	New England Patriots	**L** 0–32	1–10	Astrodome	27,344
12	December 2	Oakland Raiders	**L** 6–17	1–11	Astrodome	25,801
13	December 9	at **Pittsburgh Steelers**	**L** 7–33	1–12	Three Rivers Stadium	38,004
14	December 16	**Cincinnati Bengals**	**L** 24–27	1–13	Astrodome	21,955
Note: Intra-division opponents are in **bold** text.

== Game summaries ==
=== Week 3 ===
Pittsburgh Steelers (2–0) at Houston Oilers (0–2)

Quarter	1	2	3	4	Total
Steelers	3	3	13	17	36
Oilers	0	7	0	0	7

at Astrodome, Houston, Texas

- Date: September 30
- Game time: 2:00 p.m.
- Game weather: Indoors (dome)
- Game attendance: 39,331
- Referee: Jim Tunney
- Pro-Football-Reference.com

Game information

Steelers

- Terry Bradshaw
  9/17, 159 Yds, TD, 2 INT
- John Fuqua
  13 Rush, 48 Yds
- Frank Lewis
  1 Rec, 44 Yds

Oilers

- Dan Pastorini
  14/25, 87 Yds, TD, 2 INT
- Bob Gresham
  14 Rush, 41 Yds
- Billy Parks
  7 Rec, 80 Yds

Scoring summary

Quarter	Time	Drive			Team	Scoring information	Score	
Quarter	Time	Plays	Yards	TOP	Team	Scoring information	PIT	HOU
1					Steelers	20-yard field goal by Gerela	3	0
2					Oilers	Alston 7-yard touchdown reception from Pastorini, Butler kick good	3	7
2					Steelers	47-yard field goal by Gerela	6	7
3					Steelers	Bradshaw 1-yard touchdown run, Gerela kick no good	12	7
3					Steelers	Interception returned 45 yards for touchdown by Russell, Gerela kick good	19	7
4					Steelers	Shanklin 26-yard touchdown reception from Bradshaw, Gerela kick good	26	7
4					Steelers	26-yard field goal by Gerela	29	7
4					Steelers	Interception returned 86 yards for touchdown by Edwards, Gerela kick good	36	7
"TOP" = time of possession. For other American football terms, see Glossary of American football.							36	7

== Standings ==
AFC Central
	W	L	T	PCT	DIV	CONF	PF	PA	STK
Cincinnati Bengals	10	4	0	.714	4–2	8–3	286	231	W6
Pittsburgh Steelers	10	4	0	.714	4–2	7–4	347	210	W2
Cleveland Browns	7	5	2	.571	4–2	6–3–2	234	255	L2
Houston Oilers	1	13	0	.071	0–6	1–10	199	447	L6
