= 1973 Miami Dolphins season =

8th season in franchise history; second Super Bowl win

- Owner: Joe Robbie
- Head coach: Don Shula
- Home stadium: Miami Orange Bowl

Results
- Record: 12–2
- Division place: 1st AFC East
- Playoffs: Won Divisional Playoffs (vs. Bengals) 34–16; Won AFC Championship (vs. Raiders) 27–10; Won Super Bowl VIII (vs. Vikings) 24–7
- Pro Bowlers: 12; QB Bob Griese; LT Wayne Moore; LB Nick Buoniconti; RB Mercury Morris; C Jim Langer; WR Paul Warfield; FS Jake Scott; DE Bill Stanfill; FB Larry Csonka; K Garo Yepremian; G Larry Little; SS Dick Anderson

The 1973 Miami Dolphins season was the franchise's eighth season and fourth season in the National Football League (NFL). The team entered the 1973 season as defending Super Bowl champions following its perfect undefeated 1972 season.

In week 1, the Dolphins extended their winning streak to 18 with a 21–13 win over the San Francisco 49ers. However, the following week, they were defeated 12–7 by the Oakland Raiders to end the winning streak. The streak stood as an NFL record until it was broken by the New England Patriots in 2004 whose record of 21 consecutive wins still stands.

The team won the AFC East, finishing with a regular season record of 12–2, and then defeated the Cincinnati Bengals in the Divisional Round, the Raiders in the AFC Championship game, and the Minnesota Vikings in the league's eighth Super Bowl. It was the Dolphins' second consecutive (and to date last) Super Bowl victory. With the Dolphins' combined records of 17–0 and 15–2 over the course of their 1972 and 1973 seasons, the Dolphins posted a 32–2 total record over 2 years, for a winning percentage of .941. The Dolphins allowed just 10.7 points per game in the regular season, a franchise record still standing today.

The last remaining active member of the 1973 Miami Dolphins was offensive lineman Ed Newman, who retired after the 1984 season, right after making it to Super Bowl XIX, also as a member of the Dolphins.

== Season summary ==
Although the Dolphins were unable to match their 17–0 perfect season of 1972, many sports writers, fans, and Dolphins players themselves felt that the 1973 team was better. While the 1972 team faced no competition in the regular season that had a record of better than 8-6 and/or .500, the 1973 team played against a much tougher schedule that included games against the Oakland Raiders, Pittsburgh Steelers, and Dallas Cowboys (all playoff teams), plus two games against a resurgent Bills squad that featured 2,000-yard rusher O. J. Simpson, and a Cleveland Browns team that finished over .500. Miami finished with a 12–2 regular season, including their opening game victory over the defending 1972 NFC West champions, the San Francisco 49ers that tied an NFL record with eighteen consecutive wins. The Dolphins' streak ended in week two with a 12–7 loss to the Raiders in Berkeley, California. Miami then won the next 10 games. In November, the Dolphins scored 92 consecutive points against opponents, recording back to back shutout wins, before Dallas broke the string with a score on Thanksgiving Day.

Just like the two previous seasons, Miami's offense relied primarily on their rushing attack. Fullback Larry Csonka recorded his third consecutive 1,000 rushing yard season (1,003 yards), while running back Mercury Morris rushed for 954 yards and scored 10 touchdowns, while leading the league with 6.4 yards per carry. Running back Jim Kiick was also a key contributor, rushing for 257 yards, and catching 27 passes for 208 yards. Quarterback Bob Griese, the AFC's second leading passer, completed only 116 passes for 1,422 yards, but threw about twice as many touchdown passes (17) as interceptions (8), and earned an 84.3 passer rating. Wide receiver Paul Warfield remained the main deep threat on the team, catching 29 passes for 514 yards and 11 touchdowns. The offensive line remained strong led by center Jim Langer and right guard Larry Little. Griese, Csonka, Warfield, Langer, and Little would all eventually be elected to the Pro Football Hall of Fame.

Miami's "No Name Defense" continued to dominate their opponents. Future Hall of Fame linebacker Nick Buoniconti recovered three fumbles and returned one for a touchdown. Safety Dick Anderson led the team with eight interceptions, which he returned for 163 yards and two touchdowns. And safety Jake Scott, the previous season's Super Bowl MVP, had four interceptions and 71 return yards. The Dolphins were still using their "53" defense devised at the beginning of the 1972 season, where Bob Matheson (#53) would be brought in as a fourth linebacker in a 3–4 defense, with Manny Fernandez at nose tackle. Matheson could either rush the quarterback or drop back into coverage.

In 2007, ESPN.com ranked the 1973 Dolphins as the eight-greatest defense in NFL history, noting that the team "held 11 opponents to 14 points or less, setting a record by allowing just 150 points in a 14-game season". Through 11 games and the first half of a Monday night against Pittsburgh, they had permitted only 104 points. Defensive end Bill Stanfill set a Dolphins' sack record that still stands, with 18.5. In the playoffs and Super Bowl, they allowed only 33 points against Cincinnati, Oakland and Minnesota. Stanfill, Manny Fernandez, Hall of Fame middle linebacker Nick Buoniconti, and safeties Dick Anderson (AP Defensive Player of the Year) and Jake Scott were all named to the 1973 All-Pro team. They also held record-breaking rusher O. J. Simpson to his lowest total yardage of the season, a mere 55 yards in Week Six.

To date, the 1973 Miami Dolphins remain one of two teams (the 2019 Baltimore Ravens being the other) in NFL history with 12 players on their roster to be selected for the Pro Bowl.

== Offseason ==
=== Draft ===
1973 Miami Dolphins draft
Round	Pick	Player	Position	College	Notes
2	52	Chuck Bradley	TE	Oregon	Placed on IR
3	78	Leon Gray *	OT	Jackson State	Released, signed with New England Patriots
4	104	Bo Rather	WR	Michigan	
5	111	Don Strock	QB	Virginia Tech	
5	130	Dave McCurry	DB	Iowa State	
6	156	Ed Newman *	OG	Duke	
7	160	Kevin Reilly	LB	Villanova	
7	163	Benny Shepherd	RB	Arkansas Tech	
7	178	Willie Hatter	WR	Northern Illinois	
7	182	Thomas Smith	FB	Miami (FL)	
8	208	Archie Pearmon	DE	Northeast Oklahoma	
9	234	Karl Lorch	DT	USC	
10	260	Ron Fernandes	DE	Eastern Michigan	
11	286	Chris Kete	C	Boston University	
12	312	Mike Mullen	LB	Tulane	
13	338	Joe Booker	RB	Miami (OH)	
14	364	Greg Boyd	RB	Arizona	
15	389	Bill Palmer	TE	St. Thomas	
16	416	James Jackson	DE	Norfolk State	
17	442	Charlie Wade	WR	Tennessee State	Mr. Irrelevant
Made roster * Made at least one Pro Bowl during career

== Personnel ==
=== Staff / Coaches ===
1973 Miami Dolphins staff
Front office: President – Joe Robbie; Vice president – Don Shula; Director of player personnel – Bobby Beathard; Head coaches: Head coach – Don Shula; Offensive coaches: Offense – Bill McPeak; Offensive backs – Carl Taseff; Offensive line – Monte Clark	Defensive coaches: Assistant head coach/defense – Bill Arnsparger; Defensive line – Mike Scarry; Defensive backs – Tom Keane; Special teams coaches: None - N/A; Strength and conditioning: None - N/A

=== Roster ===
1973 Miami Dolphins roster
Quarterbacks (QB): 12 Bob Griese; 15 Earl Morrall; 10 Don Strock; Running backs (RB): 22 Mercury Morris; 39 Larry Csonka FB; 32 Hubert Ginn; 21 Jim Kiick; 23 Charles Leigh FB; 36 Don Nottingham; 29 Tom Smith FB; Wide receivers (WR): 86 Marlin Briscoe; 42 Paul Warfield; 82 Bo Rather; 34 Ron Sellers; 81 Howard Twilley; Tight ends (TE): 80 Marv Fleming; 88 Jim Mandich	Offensive linemen (OL): 79 Wayne Moore T; 67 Bob Kuechenberg G; 62 Jim Langer C; 66 Larry Little G; 73 Norm Evans T; 77 Doug Crusan T; 55 Irv Goode G; 64 Ed Newman G; 76 Willie Young T; Defensive linemen (DL): 83 Vern Den Herder DE; 75 Manny Fernandez DT; 72 Bob Heinz DT; 84 Bill Stanfill DE; 68 Ron Berger DT; 65 Maulty Moore DT; 70 Larry Woods DE	Linebackers (LB): 59 Doug Swift; 85 Nick Buoniconti; 57 Mike Kolen; 51 Larry Ball; 58 Bruce Bannon; 53 Bob Matheson; 56 Jesse Powell; Defensive backs (DB): 25 Tim Foley CB; 45 Curtis Johnson CB; 13 Jake Scott FS; 40 Dick Anderson SS; 49 Charlie Babb SS; 26 Lloyd Mumphord CB; 48 Henry Stuckey CB; Special teams (ST): 1 Garo Yepremian K; 20 Larry Seiple P	Practice squad: 10 Don Strock QB; Reserve: -- Chuck Bradley C (IR); Rookies in italics

== Preseason ==
Week	Date	Opponent	Result	Record	Venue	Attendance	Recap
1	July 27	vs. College All-Stars	W 14–3	1–0	Soldier Field (Chicago)	54,103	Recap
2	August 4	Cincinnati Bengals	W 14–13	2–0	Miami Orange Bowl	78,091	Recap
3	August 11	New Orleans Saints	W 14–13	3–0	Miami Orange Bowl	80,050	Recap
4	August 18	Chicago Bears	T 9–9	3–0–1	Miami Orange Bowl	78,590	Recap
5	August 24	Los Angeles Rams	W 17–14	4–0–1	Miami Orange Bowl	78,618	Recap
6	August 31	at Minnesota Vikings	L 17–20	4–1–1	Metropolitan Stadium	46,619	Recap
7	September 6	at Dallas Cowboys	L 23–26	4–2–1	Texas Stadium	61,378	Recap

== Regular season ==
=== Schedule ===
Week	Date	Opponent	Result	Record	Venue	Attendance
1	September 16	San Francisco 49ers	**W** 21–13	1–0	Miami Orange Bowl	68,275
2	September 23	at Oakland Raiders	**L** 7–12	1–1	California Memorial Stadium	74,121
3	September 30	**New England Patriots**	**W** 44–23	2–1	Miami Orange Bowl	62,508
4	October 7	**New York Jets**	**W** 31–3	3–1	Miami Orange Bowl	63,850
5	October 15	at Cleveland Browns	**W** 17–9	4–1	Cleveland Municipal Stadium	70,070
6	October 21	**Buffalo Bills**	**W** 27–6	5–1	Miami Orange Bowl	65,241
7	October 28	at **New England Patriots**	**W** 30–14	6–1	Schaefer Stadium	57,617
8	November 4	at **New York Jets**	**W** 24–14	7–1	Shea Stadium	57,791
9	November 11	**Baltimore Colts**	**W** 44–0	8–1	Miami Orange Bowl	60,332
10	November 18	at **Buffalo Bills**	**W** 17–0	9–1	Rich Stadium	77,138
11	November 22	at Dallas Cowboys	**W** 14–7	10–1	Texas Stadium	58,089
12	December 3	Pittsburgh Steelers	**W** 30–26	11–1	Miami Orange Bowl	68,901
13	December 9	at **Baltimore Colts**	**L** 3–16	11–2	Memorial Stadium	58,446
14	December 15	Detroit Lions	**W** 34–7	12–2	Miami Orange Bowl	53,375
Note: Intra-division opponents are in **bold** text.

=== Game summaries ===
==== Week 1 ====
Team	1	2	3	4	Total
49ers	3	7	3	0	13
• Dolphins	3	3	0	15	21

- Date: September 16
- Location: Orange Bowl
- Game start: 1:00 p.m. EST
- Game weather: 92 °F (33 °C); wind 8 mph (13 km/h)
- Referee: Jim Tunney
- TV announcers (CBS): Jack Whitaker and Wayne Walker

Scoring summary
Q1	SF	Gossett 47 yard field goal	SF 3–0
Q1	MIA	Yepremian 31 yard field goal	Tie 3–3
Q2	MIA	Yepremian 53 yard field goal	MIA 6–3
Q2	SF	Washington 3 yard run (Gossett kick)	SF 10–6
Q3	SF	Gossett 30 yard field goal	SF 13–6
Q4	MIA	Warfield 10 yard pass from Griese (Yepremian kick)	Tie 13–13
Q4	MIA	Yepremian 45 yard field goal	MIA 16–13
Q4	MIA	Safety, Wittum tackled by Johnson in end zone	MIA 18–13
Q4	MIA	Yepremian 22 yard field goal	MIA 21–13

==== Week 2 at Raiders ====
Week Two: Miami Dolphins (1–0) at Oakland Raiders (0–1)

Quarter	1	2	3	4	Total
Dolphins	0	0	0	7	**7**
**Raiders**	3	3	3	3	**12**

at Memorial Stadium, Berkeley, California

- Date: September 23
- Game time: 4:00 p.m.
- Game weather: 62 °F (17 °C)
- Game attendance: 74,121
- Referee: Norm Schachter
- TV announcers (NBC): Curt Gowdy and Al DeRogatis
- Box Score

Game information

**First quarter**

- OAK – George Blanda 12-yard field goal. Raiders 3–0. Drive:

**Second quarter**

- OAK – George Blanda 46-yard field goal. Raiders 6–0. Drive:

**Third quarter**

- OAK – George Blanda 19-yard field goal. Raiders 9–0. Drive:

**Fourth quarter**

- OAK – George Blanda 10-yard field goal. Raiders 12–0. Drive:
- MIA – Jim Mandich 28-yard pass from Bob Griese (Garo Yepremian kick). Raiders 12–7. Drive:

Top passers

- MIA – Bob Griese – 12/25, 90 yards, TD
- OAK – Daryle Lamonica – 7/10, 63 yards, INT

Top rushers

- MIA – Mercury Morris – 7 rushes, 48 yards
- OAK – Marv Hubbard – 20 rushes, 88 yards

Top receivers

- MIA – Jim Mandich – 2 receptions, 38 yards, TD
- OAK – Fred Biletnikoff – 3 receptions, 36 yards

The Raiders became the first team to defeat Miami since Super Bowl VI. The game was played at Memorial Stadium in Berkeley due to a scheduling conflict at Oakland–Alameda County Coliseum with the A's.

==== Week 4 ====
Team	1	2	3	4	Total
Jets	0	0	0	3	3
• Dolphins	14	10	7	0	31

- Date: October 7
- Location: Orange Bowl
- Game start: 1:00 p.m. EST
- Game weather: 80 °F (27 °C); wind 6 mph (9.7 km/h)
- Referee: Chuck Heberling

Scoring summary
Q1	MIA	Morris 3 yard run (Yepremian kick)	MIA 7–0
Q1	MIA	Briscoe 12 yard pass from Griese (Yepremian kick)	MIA 14–0
Q2	MIA	Yepremian 19 yard field goal	MIA 17–0
Q2	MIA	Warfield 3 yard pass from Griese (Yepremian kick)	MIA 24–0
Q3	MIA	Warfield 40 yard pass from Griese (Yepremian kick)	MIA 31–0
Q4	NYJ	Howfield 38 yard field goal	MIA 31–3

==== Week 6 ====
Week 6: Buffalo Bills at Miami Dolphins

Team	1	2	3	4	Total
Buffalo Bills (4–2)	3	0	0	3	6
• Miami Dolphins (5–1)	3	21	3	0	27

- Date: October 21, 1973
- Location: Orange Bowl (astroturf)
  Miami, Florida
- Game start: 1:00 PM
- Game attendance: 65,241
- Game weather: 80 °F (27 °C), relative humidity 77%, wind 17 mph (27 km/h) mph
- Referee: Fred Silva

Miami took over first place in the AFC East by halting Simpson's streak of consecutive 100-yard performances. They held him to 55 yards on 14 carries before he left the game with an ankle sprain in the fourth quarter. Miami posted a 21-point second quarter highlighted by a pair of touchdown passes from Bob Griese to Jim Mandich. The Bills made no first downs in the first half. Leypoldt and Garo Yepremian opened and closed the scoring by swapping field goals. The Dolphins' other touchdown came when a 21-yard Paul Warfield reception set up a Mercury Morris 4-yard touchdown.

==== Week 8 ====
Team	1	2	3	4	Total
• Dolphins	7	7	10	0	24
Jets	0	14	0	0	14

- Date: November 4
- Location: Shea Stadium
- Game start: 1:00 p.m. EST
- Game weather: 47 °F (8 °C); wind 17 mph (27 km/h)
- Referee: Fred Wyant

Scoring summary
Q1	MIA	Morris 19 yard run (Yepremian kick)	MIA 7–0
Q2	NYJ	Riggins 1 yard run (Howfield kick)	Tie 7–7
Q2	NYJ	Riggins 3 yard run (Howfield kick)	NYJ 14–7
Q2	MIA	Morris 4 yard run (Yepremian kick)	Tie 14–14
Q3	MIA	Warfield 37 yard pass from Griese (Yepremian kick)	MIA 21–14
Q3	MIA	Yepremian 20 yard field goal	MIA 24–14

==== Week 10 ====
Week 10: Miami Dolphins at Buffalo Bills

Team	1	2	3	4	Total
• Miami Dolphins (9–1)	7	10	0	0	17
Buffalo Bills (5–5)	0	0	0	0	0

- Date: November 18, 1973
- Location: Rich Stadium (astroturf)
  Orchard Park, New York
- Game start: 1:00 PM
- Game attendance: 77,138
- Game weather: 37 degrees, relative humidity 70%, wind 12 mph (19 km/h) mph, wind chill 28
- Referee: Dick Jorgensen

The Dolphins clinched the East Division title with a 17–0 shutout of the Bills. Miami's first touchdown drive included two fourth-and-one conversions by Jim Kiick. With Miami leading 10–0, Buffalo drove from their own 20-yard-line to the Dolphins' 4-yard-line and then turned the ball over on downs four plays later at the 1-yard-line. In the game, the Bills were shut out despite a pair of 100-yard rushing efforts by Simpson and Braxton who posted 120 and 119 yards respectively.

==== Week 12 ====
Team	1	2	3	4	Total
Steelers	0	3	7	16	26
• Dolphins	20	10	0	0	30

- Date: December 3
- Location: Orange Bowl
- Game start: 9:00 p.m. EST
- Game attendance: 68,901
- Game weather: 75 °F (24 °C); wind 14 mph (23 km/h)
- Referee: Ben Dreith
- TV announcers (ABC): Frank Gifford, Howard Cosell, and Don Meredith

Scoring summary
Q1	MIA	Anderson 27 yard interception return (Yepremian kick)	MIA 7–0
Q1	MIA	Yepremian 28 yard field goal	MIA 10–0
Q1	MIA	Yepremian 46 yard field goal	MIA 13–0
Q1	MIA	Mandich 2 yard pass from Griese (Yepremian kick)	MIA 20–0
Q2	MIA	Anderson 38 yard interception return (Yepremian kick)	MIA 27–0
Q2	PIT	Gerela 37 yard field goal	MIA 27–3
Q2	MIA	Yepremian 14 yard field goal	MIA 30–3
Q3	PIT	P. Pearson 5 yard pass from Bradshaw (Gerela kick)	MIA 30–10
Q4	PIT	Harris 21 yard run (Gerela kick)	MIA 30–17
Q4	PIT	B. Pearson 17 yard pass from Bradshaw (Gerela kick)	MIA 30–24
Q4	PIT	Safety, Griese tackled by White in end zone	MIA 30–26

==== Week 14 ====
Team	1	2	3	4	Total
Lions	0	0	0	7	7
• Dolphins	14	17	3	0	34

- Date: December 15
- Location: Orange Bowl
- Game start: 1:00 p.m. EST
- Game weather: 69 °F (21 °C); wind 7 mph (11 km/h)
- Referee: Norm Schachter
- TV announcers (CBS): Jack Buck and Pat Summerall

Scoring summary
Q1	MIA	Warfield 21 yard pass from Griese (Yepremian kick)	MIA 7–0
Q1	MIA	Warfield 7 yard pass from Griese (Yepremian kick)	MIA 14–0
Q2	MIA	Yepremian 27 yard field goal	MIA 17–0
Q2	MIA	Warfield 16 yard pass from Griese (Yepremian kick)	MIA 24–0
Q2	MIA	Warfield 4 yard pass from Griese (Yepremian kick)	MIA 31–0
Q3	MIA	Yepremian 28 yard field goal	MIA 34–0
Q4	DET	Owens 5 yard run (Mann kick)	MIA 34–7

=== Standings ===
AFC East
	W	L	T	PCT	DIV	CONF	PF	PA	STK
Miami Dolphins	12	2	0	.857	7–1	9–2	343	150	W1
Buffalo Bills	9	5	0	.643	6–2	7–4	259	230	W4
New England Patriots	5	9	0	.357	1–7	3–8	258	300	L2
New York Jets	4	10	0	.286	4–4	4–7	240	306	L2
Baltimore Colts	4	10	0	.286	2–6	2–9	226	341	W2

== Postseason ==
=== Divisional ===
Team	1	2	3	4	Total
Bengals	3	13	0	0	16
• Dolphins	14	7	10	3	34

- Date: December 23
- Location: Orange Bowl
- Game start: 1:00 p.m. EST
- Game attendance: 78,928
- Game weather: 55 °F (13 °C); wind 8 mph (13 km/h)
- Referee: Bernie Ulman
- TV announcers (NBC): Curt Gowdy and Al DeRogatis

Scoring summary
Q1	MIA	Warfield 13 yard pass from Griese (Yepremian kick)	MIA 7–0
Q1	CIN	Muhlmann 24 yard field goal	MIA 7–3
Q1	MIA	Csonka 1 yard run (Yepremian kick)	MIA 14–3
Q2	MIA	Morris 4 yard run (Yepremian kick)	MIA 21–3
Q2	CIN	Craig 45 yard interception return (Muhlmann kick)	MIA 21–10
Q2	CIN	Muhlmann 46 yard field goal	MIA 21–13
Q2	CIN	Muhlmann 10 yard field goal	MIA 21–16
Q3	MIA	Mandich 7 yard pass from Griese (Yepremian kick)	MIA 28–16
Q3	MIA	Yepremian 50 yard field goal	MIA 31–16
Q4	MIA	Yepremian 46 yard field goal	MIA 34–16

The Dolphins outgained Cincinnati in total yards, 400–194, and first downs, 27–11, while also scoring on three of their first four possessions and shutting out the Bengals in the second half. The Dolphins racked up 241 yards on the ground, including 106 from Mercury Morris and 71 from Larry Csonka, while receiver Paul Warfield caught 5 passes for 95 yards and a score. Bob Griese completed 11 of 18 passes for 159 yards, 2 touchdowns and an interception, for a passer rating of 103.7. Griese's 18 pass attempts were the most that he would throw throughout the entire 1973-74 playoffs. For the rest of the playoffs, Griese would throw less than 10 times per game.

=== Conference Championship ===
Team	1	2	3	4	Total
Raiders	0	0	10	0	10
• Dolphins	7	7	3	10	27

- Date: December 30
- Location: Orange Bowl
- Game start: 4:00 p.m. EST
- Game attendance: 79,325
- Game weather: 74 °F (23 °C); wind 8 mph (13 km/h)
- Referee: Tommy Bell
- TV announcers (NBC): Curt Gowdy and Al DeRogatis

Scoring summary
Q1	MIA	Csonka 11 yard run (Yepremian kick)	MIA 7–0
Q2	MIA	Csonka 2 yard run (Yepremian kick)	MIA 14–0
Q3	OAK	Blanda 21 yard field goal	MIA 14–3
Q3	MIA	Yepremian 42 yard field goal	MIA 17–3
Q3	OAK	Siani 25 yard pass from Stabler (Blanda kick)	MIA 17–10
Q4	MIA	Yepremian 26 yard field goal	MIA 20–10
Q4	MIA	Csonka 2 yard run (Yepremian kick)	MIA 27–10

Running back Larry Csonka led the Dolphins to a victory with 117 rushing yards and 3 touchdowns. Mercury Morris also ran for 86 yards. Bob Griese threw just six passes during the game, completing three.

=== Super Bowl ===
Team	1	2	3	4	Total
Vikings	0	0	0	7	7
• Dolphins	14	3	7	0	24

- Date: January 13
- Location: Rice Stadium
- Game start: 2:50 p.m. CDT
- Game attendance: 71,882
- Game weather: Cloudy; 47 °F (8 °C)
- Referee: Ben Dreith
- TV announcers (CBS): Ray Scott, Pat Summerall, and Bart Starr

Scoring summary
Q1	MIA	Csonka 5 yard run (Yepremian kick)	MIA 7–0
Q1	MIA	Kiick 1 yard run (Yepremian kick)	MIA 14–0
Q2	MIA	Yepremian 28 yard field goal	MIA 17–0
Q3	MIA	Csonka 2 yard run (Yepremian kick)	MIA 24–0
Q4	MIN	Tarkenton 4 yard run (Cox kick)	MIA 24–7

Larry Csonka rushed for 145 yards on 33 carries, scoring two touchdowns, and was named MVP. Bob Griese threw just seven passes all game, completing six.

== Awards and honors ==
- Larry Csonka, Super Bowl Most Valuable Player

Pro Bowl Selections (voted by NFL coaches for players other than their own):

Offense:

- Bob Griese, Quarterback
- Jim Langer, Offensive line (center)
- Larry Little, Offensive line (guard)
- Wayne Moore, Offensive line (tackle)
- Larry Csonka, Running back
- Mercury Morris, Running back
- Paul Warfield, Wide Receiver
- Garo Yepremian, Place Kicker

Defense:

- Bill Stanfill, Defensive end
- Nick Buoniconti, Middle Linebacker
- Dick Anderson, Safety
- Jake Scott, Safety
