= 1973 Oakland Raiders season =

NFL team season

- Owner: Al Davis
- General manager: Al Davis
- Head coach: John Madden
- Home stadium: Oakland–Alameda County Coliseum; California Memorial Stadium (1 Game)

Results
- Record: 9–4–1
- Division place: 1st AFC West
- Playoffs: Won Divisional Playoffs (vs. Steelers) 33–14; Lost AFC Championship (at Dolphins) 10–27

The 1973 Oakland Raiders season was the team's 14th season, and fourth in the National Football League.

In Week Two of the regular season, the Raiders defeated the Miami Dolphins, ending Miami's 18-game winning-streak including a perfect season in 1972.

For the third time in four seasons, the Raiders won the AFC West title. They exacted a measure of revenge by defeating the Pittsburgh Steelers in the AFC Division Round game, one year following the Immaculate Reception loss. But the Raiders failed to reach the Super Bowl as they lost to Miami 27–10 in the AFC Championship Game.

== Offseason ==
=== Draft ===
1973 Oakland Raiders draft
Round	Pick	Player	Position	College	Notes
1	23	Ray Guy * ^{†}	P	Southern Miss	
2	49	Monte Johnson	LB	Nebraska	
4	92	Perry Smith	DB	Colorado State	
4	101	Joe Wylie	RB	Oklahoma	
5	124	Louis Neal	WR	Prairie View A&M	
5	127	Ron Mikolajczyk	OT	Tampa	
6	153	Brent Myers	OT	Purdue	
7	179	Gary Weaver	LB	Fresno State	
8	205	Mike Rae	QB	USC	
9	231	Steve Sweeney	WR	California	
10	257	Leo Allen	WR	Tuskegee	
11	283	Jerry List	RB	Nebraska	
12	309	Jim Krapf	OG	Alabama	
14	361	Bruce Polen	DB	William Penn	
15	387	Dave Leffers	OG	Vanderbilt	
16	413	Jerry Gadlin	WR	Wyoming	
17	439	Michael Ryan	OG	USC	
Made roster † Pro Football Hall of Fame * Made at least one Pro Bowl during career

== Personnel ==
=== Staff / Coaches ===
1973 Oakland Raiders staff
Front office: Principal Owner/General Manager - Al Davis; Minority Co-Owner - Eddie McGah; Minority Co-Owner - F. Wayne Valley; President of the General Partner / General Manager – Al Davis; Senior Executive – John Herrera; Scout/ Executive assistant, Personnel Director - Ken Herock; Executive Assistant / Scout - Al LoCasale; Head coaches: Head Coach – John Madden; Assistant Head Coach / Executive Assistant - Tom Flores; Offensive coaches: Offensive Backs – Paul Roach; Receivers Coach – Mike Holovak; Offensive line – Ollie Spencer	Defensive coaches: Defensive Line – Tom Dahms; Linebackers – Don Shinnick; Defensive Backfield – Bob Zeman; Special teams coaches: Special teams – None - N/A

=== Roster ===
1973 Oakland Raiders roster
Quarterbacks (QB): 3 Daryle Lamonica; 15 Don Milan; 12 Ken Stabler; Running backs (RB): 40 Pete Banaszak; 28 Clarence Davis; 44 Marv Hubbard; 36 Bob Hudson; 23 Charlie Smith; Wide receivers (WR): 25 Fred Biletnikoff; 21 Cliff Branch; 49 Mike Siani; 89 Steve Sweeney; Tight ends (TE): 46 Warren Bankston; 18 Kent Gaydos; 88 Bob Moore	Offensive linemen (OL): 76 Bob Brown T; 64 George Buehler G; 50 Dave Dalby C/G; 79 Dan Medlin G; 00 Jim Otto C; 65 Paul Seiler T; 78 Art Shell T; 63 Gene Upshaw G; 75 John Vella T; Defensive linemen (DL): 84 Tony Cline DE; 83 Ben Davidson DE; 82 Horace Jones DE; 71 Kelvin Korver DT; 60 Otis Sistrunk DT; 77 Bubba Smith DE; 80 Art Thoms DT	Linebackers (LB): 55 Dan Conners MLB; 51 Joe Carroll MLB; 86 Gerald Irons OLB; 58 Monte Johnson OLB; 52 Gary Weaver OLB; 41 Phil Villapiano OLB; Defensive backs (DB): 27 Jackie Allen CB; 43 George Atkinson SS; 24 Willie Brown CB; 42 Tommy Maxwell FS; 31 Jack Tatum FS; 26 Skip Thomas CB/S; 20 Jimmy Warren CB/S; 43 Nemiah Wilson CB; Special teams (ST): 16 George Blanda K; 8 Ray Guy P	Practice squad: None - N/A; Rookies in italics

== Regular season ==
=== Schedule ===
Week	Date	Opponent	Result	Record	Venue	Attendance
1	September 16	at Minnesota Vikings	**L** 16–24	0–1	Metropolitan Stadium	44,818
2	September 23	Miami Dolphins	**W** 12–7	1–1	California Memorial Stadium	74,121
3	September 30	at **Kansas City Chiefs**	**L** 3–16	1–2	Arrowhead Stadium	72,631
4	October 7	at St. Louis Cardinals	**W** 17–10	2–2	Busch Memorial Stadium	49,051
5	October 14	at **San Diego Chargers**	**W** 27–17	3–2	San Diego Stadium	50,672
6	October 22	at **Denver Broncos**	**T** 23–23	3–2–1	Mile High Stadium	51,270
7	October 28	at Baltimore Colts	**W** 34–21	4–2–1	Memorial Stadium	59,008
8	November 4	New York Giants	**W** 42–0	5–2–1	Oakland–Alameda County Coliseum	51,200
9	November 11	Pittsburgh Steelers	**L** 9–17	5–3–1	Oakland–Alameda County Coliseum	47,535
10	November 18	Cleveland Browns	**L** 3–7	5–4–1	Oakland–Alameda County Coliseum	47,398
11	November 25	**San Diego Chargers**	**W** 31–3	6–4–1	Oakland–Alameda County Coliseum	40,195
12	December 2	at Houston Oilers	**W** 17–6	7–4–1	Houston Astrodome	25,801
13	December 8	**Kansas City Chiefs**	**W** 37–7	8–4–1	Oakland–Alameda County Coliseum	53,945
14	December 16	**Denver Broncos**	**W** 21–17	9–4–1	Oakland–Alameda County Coliseum	51,910
Note: Intra-division opponents are in **bold** text.

=== Season summary ===
==== Week 1 at Vikings ====
Week One: Oakland Raiders (0–0) at Minnesota Vikings (0–0)

Quarter	1	2	3	4	Total
Raiders	0	13	3	0	**16**
**Vikings**	10	0	7	7	**24**

at Metropolitan Stadium, Bloomington, Minnesota

- Date: September 16
- Game time: 1:00 pm. CST
- Game weather: 50 °F (10 °C)
- Game attendance: 44,818
- Referee: Tommy Bell
- Box Score

Game information

**First quarter**

- MIN – Fred Cox 22-yard field goal. Vikings 3–0. Drive:
- MIN – John Gilliam 43-yard pass from Fran Tarkenton (Fred Cox kick). Vikings 10–0. Drive:

**Second quarter**

- OAK – George Blanda 16-yard field goal. Vikings 10–3. Drive:
- OAK – George Blanda 25-yard field goal. Vikings 10–6. Drive:
- OAK – George Atkinson 63-yard punt return (George Blanda kick). Raiders 13–10.

**Third quarter**

- OAK – George Blanda 9-yard field goal. Raiders 16–10. Drive:
- MIN – Chuck Foreman 9-yard pass from Fran Tarkenton (Fred Cox kick). Vikings 17–16. Drive:

**Fourth quarter**

- MIN – Bill Brown 6-yard run (Fred Cox kick). Vikings 24–16. Drive:

Top passers

- OAK – Daryle Lamonica – 13/30, 183 yards, 3 INT
- MIN – Fran Tarkenton – 13/31, 187 yards, 2 TD, INT

Top rushers

- OAK – Clarence Davis – 12 rushes, 73 yards
- MIN – Fran Tarkenton – 6 rushes, 27 yards

Top receivers

- OAK – Mike Siani – 6 receptions, 111 yards
- MIN – John Gilliam – 4 receptions, 90 yards, TD

==== Week 2 vs. Dolphins ====
Week Two: Miami Dolphins (1–0) at Oakland Raiders (0–1)

Quarter	1	2	3	4	Total
Dolphins	0	0	0	7	**7**
**Raiders**	3	3	3	3	**12**

at Memorial Stadium, Berkeley, California

- Date: September 23
- Game time: 1:00 pm. PST
- Game weather: 62 °F (17 °C)
- Game attendance: 74,121
- Box Score

Game information

**First quarter**

- OAK – George Blanda 12-yard field goal. Raiders 3–0. Drive:

**Second quarter**

- OAK – George Blanda 46-yard field goal. Raiders 6–0. Drive:

**Third quarter**

- OAK – George Blanda 19-yard field goal. Raiders 9–0. Drive:

**Fourth quarter**

- OAK – George Blanda 10-yard field goal. Raiders 12–0. Drive:
- MIA – Jim Mandich 28-yard pass from Bob Griese (Garo Yepremian kick). Raiders 12–7. Drive:

Top passers

- MIA – Bob Griese – 12/25, 90 yards, TD
- OAK – Daryle Lamonica – 7/10, 63 yards, INT

Top rushers

- MIA – Mercury Morris – 7 rushes, 48 yards
- OAK – Marv Hubbard – 20 rushes, 88 yards

Top receivers

- MIA – Jim Mandich – 2 receptions, 38 yards, TD
- OAK – Fred Biletnikoff – 3 receptions, 36 yards

The Raiders became the first team to defeat Miami since Super Bowl VI.

==== Week 3 at Chiefs ====
Week Three: Oakland Raiders (1–1) at Kansas City Chiefs (1–1)

Quarter	1	2	3	4	Total
Raiders	0	3	0	0	**3**
**Chiefs**	0	6	3	7	**16**

at Arrowhead Stadium, Kansas City, Missouri

- Date: September 30
- Game time: 3:00 pm. CST
- Game weather: 59 °F (15 °C)
- Game attendance: 72,631
- Box Score

Game information

**First quarter**

- No scoring

**Second quarter**

- OAK – George Blanda 21-yard field goal. Raiders 3–0. Drive:
- KC – Jan Stenerud 47-yard field goal. Tie 3–3. Drive:
- KC – Jan Stenerud 41-yard field goal. Chiefs 6–3. Drive:

**Third quarter**

- KC – Jan Stenerud 29-yard field goal. Chiefs 9–3. Drive:

**Fourth quarter**

- KC – Willie Lanier 17-yard interception return (Jan Stenerud kick). Chiefs 16–3.

Top passers

- OAK – Daryle Lamonica – 4/12, 53 yards, INT
- KC – Len Dawson – 10/13, 82 yards

Top rushers

- OAK – Charlie Smith – 11 rushes, 30 yards
- KC – Wendell Hayes – 21 rushes, 83 yards

Top receivers

- OAK – Cliff Branch – 2 receptions, 29 yards
- KC – Wendell Hayes – 3 receptions, 23 yards

==== Week 4 at Cardinals ====
Week Four: Oakland Raiders (1–2) at St. Louis Cardinals (2–1)

Quarter	1	2	3	4	Total
**Raiders**	0	3	7	7	**17**
Cardinals	7	0	3	0	**10**

at Busch Stadium, St. Louis, Missouri

- Date: October 7
- Game time: 1:00 pm. CST
- Game weather: 70 °F (21 °C)
- Game attendance: 49,051
- Box Score

Game information

**First quarter**

- STL – Jackie Smith 16-yard pass from Jim Hart (Jim Bakken kick). Cardinals 7–0. Drive:

**Second quarter**

- OAK – George Blanda 17-yard field goal. Cardinals 7–3. Drive:

**Third quarter**

- OAK – Charlie Smith 2-yard run (George Blanda kick). Raiders 10–7. Drive:
- STL – Jim Bakken 12-yard field goal. Tie 10–10. Drive:

**Fourth quarter**

- OAK – Marv Hubbard 1-yard run (George Blanda kick). Raiders 17–10. Drive:

Top passers

- OAK – Ken Stabler – 19/31, 207 yards, INT
- STL – Jim Hart – 12/27, 129 yards, TD

Top rushers

- OAK – Marv Hubbard – 11 rushes, 71 yards, TD
- STL – Terry Metcalf – 11 rushes, 57 yards

Top receivers

- OAK – Mike Siani – 6 receptions, 66 yards
- STL – Jackie Smith – 3 receptions, 53 yards, TD

The Raiders offense scored their first touchdowns of the season.

==== Week 5 at Chargers ====
Week Five: Oakland Raiders (2–2) at San Diego Chargers (1–3)

Quarter	1	2	3	4	Total
**Raiders**	0	6	7	14	**27**
Chargers	3	0	14	0	**17**

at San Diego Stadium, San Diego, California

- Date: October 14
- Game time: 2:00 pm. PST
- Game weather: 66 °F (19 °C)
- Game attendance: 50,672
- Box Score

Game information

**First quarter**

- SD – Ray Wersching 27-yard field goal. Chargers 3–0.

**Second quarter**

- OAK – George Blanda 18-yard field goal. Tie 3–3.
- OAK – George Blanda 15-yard field goal. Raiders 6–3.

**Third quarter**

- SD – Jim Thaxton 20-yard pass from Dan Fouts (Ray Wersching kick). Chargers 10–6.
- OAK – Cliff Branch 54-yard pass from Ken Stabler (George Blanda kick). Raiders 13–10.
- SD – Jerry LeVias 36-yard pass from Dan Fouts (Ray Wersching kick). Chargers 17–13.

**Fourth quarter**

- OAK – Marv Hubbard 1-yard run (George Blanda kick). Raiders 20–17.
- OAK – Bob Moore 26-yard pass from Ken Stabler (George Blanda kick). Raiders 27–17.

Top passers

- OAK – Ken Stabler – 13/22, 193 yards, 2 TD, INT
- SD – Dan Fouts – 12/30, 183 yards, 2 TD, INT

Top rushers

- OAK – Marv Hubbard – 16 rushes, 76 yards, TD
- SD – Robert Holmes – 6 rushes, 36 yards

Top receivers

- OAK – Cliff Branch – 2 receptions, 71 yards, TD
- SD – Jim Thaxton – 4 receptions, 63 yards, TD

==== Week 6 at Broncos ====
Week Six: Oakland Raiders (3–2) at Denver Broncos (2–3)

Quarter	1	2	3	4	Total
Raiders	0	13	7	3	**23**
Broncos	7	0	10	6	**23**

at Mile High Stadium, Denver, Colorado

- Date: October 22
- Game time: 7:00 pm. MST
- Game weather: 58 °F (14 °C)
- Game attendance: 51,270
- TV announcers (ABC): Frank Gifford, Don Meredith, and Howard Cosell
- Box Score

Game information

**First quarter**

- DEN – Bill Thompson 80-yard fumble return (Jim Turner kick). Broncos 7–0.

**Second quarter**

- OAK – George Blanda 35-yard field goal. Broncos 7–3.
- OAK – Mike Siani 80-yard pass from Ken Stabler (George Blanda kick). Raiders 10–7.
- OAK – George Blanda 13-yard field goal. Raiders 13–7.

**Third quarter**

- DEN – Floyd Little 1-yard run (Jim Turner kick). Broncos 14–13.
- DEN – Jim Turner 43-yard field goal. Broncos 17–13.
- OAK – Cliff Branch 16-yard pass from Ken Stabler (George Blanda kick). Raiders 20–17.

**Fourth quarter**

- DEN – Jim Turner 37-yard field goal. Tie 20–20.
- OAK – George Blanda 49-yard field goal. Raiders 23–20.
- DEN – Jim Turner 35-yard field goal. Tie 23–23.

Top passers

- OAK – Ken Stabler – 16/24, 313 yards, 2 TD
- DEN – Charley Johnson – 11/24, 115 yards, 2 INT

Top rushers

- OAK – Charlie Smith – 13 rushes, 51 yards
- DEN – Floyd Little – 22 rushes, 71 yards, TD

Top receivers

- OAK – Fred Biletnikoff – 8 receptions, 116 yards
- DEN – Riley Odoms – 3 receptions, 49 yards

==== Week 7 at Colts ====
Week Seven: Oakland Raiders (3–2–1) at Baltimore Colts (2–4)

Quarter	1	2	3	4	Total
**Raiders**	3	10	7	14	**34**
Colts	0	0	7	14	**21**

at Memorial Stadium, Baltimore, Maryland

- Date: October 28
- Game time: 2:00 pm. EST
- Game weather: 53 °F (12 °C)
- Game attendance: 59,008
- Box Score

Game information

**First quarter**

- OAK – George Blanda 27-yard field goal. Raiders 3–0.

**Second quarter**

- OAK – Mike Siani 26-yard pass from Ken Stabler (George Blanda kick). Raiders 10–0.
- OAK – George Blanda 30-yard field goal. Raiders 13–0.

**Third quarter**

- BAL – Glenn Doughty 40-yard pass from Marty Domres (George Hunt kick). Raiders 13–7.
- OAK – Bob Moore 9-yard pass from Ken Stabler (George Blanda kick). Raiders 20–7.

**Fourth quarter**

- OAK – Clarence Davis 9-yard run (George Blanda kick). Raiders 27–7.
- BAL – Lydell Mitchell 1-yard run (George Hunt kick). Raiders 27–14.
- BAL – Raymond Chester 15-yard pass from Marty Domres (George Hunt kick). Raiders 27–21.
- OAK – Clarence Davis 12-yard run (George Blanda kick). Raiders 34–21.

Top passers

- OAK – Ken Stabler – 25/29, 304 yards, 2 TD
- BAL – Marty Domres – 15/26, 224 yards, 2 TD, 2 INT

Top rushers

- OAK – Clarence Davis – 8 rushes, 57 yards, 2 TD
- BAL – Lydell Mitchell – 15 rushes, 57 yards, TD

Top receivers

- OAK – Mike Siani – 6 receptions, 96 yards, TD
- BAL – Don McCauley – 5 receptions, 72 yards

==== Week 8 vs. Giants ====
Week Eight: New York Giants (1–5–1) at Oakland Raiders (4–2–1)

Quarter	1	2	3	4	Total
Giants	0	0	0	0	**0**
**Raiders**	14	14	7	7	**42**

at Oakland–Alameda County Coliseum, Oakland, California

- Date: November 4
- Game time: 1:00 pm. PST
- Game weather: 49 °F (9 °C)
- Game attendance: 51,200
- Box Score

Game information

**First quarter**

- OAK – Clarence Davis 5-yard run (George Blanda kick). Raiders 7–0.
- OAK – Bob Moore 21-yard pass from Ken Stabler (George Blanda kick). Raiders 14–0.

**Second quarter**

- OAK – Marv Hubbard 8-yard run (George Blanda kick). Raiders 21–0.
- OAK – Charlie Smith 18-yard pass from Ken Stabler (George Blanda kick). Raiders 28–0.

**Third quarter**

- OAK – Marv Hubbard 9-yard run (George Blanda kick). Raiders 35–0.

**Fourth quarter**

- OAK – Steve Sweeney 34-yard pass from Daryle Lamonica (George Blanda kick). Raiders 42–0.

Top passers

- NYG – Norm Snead – 9/24, 137 yards, 2 INT
- OAK – Ken Stabler – 16/21, 212 yards, 2 TD, 2 INT

Top rushers

- NYG – Charlie Evans – 9 rushes, 33 yards
- OAK – Clarence Davis – 10 rushes, 63 yards, TD

Top receivers

- NYG – Bob Grim – 4 receptions, 62 yards
- OAK – Mike Siani – 4 receptions, 58 yards

==== Week 9 vs. Steelers ====
Week Nine: Pittsburgh Steelers (7–1) at Oakland Raiders (5–2–1)

Quarter	1	2	3	4	Total
**Steelers**	0	7	7	3	**17**
Raiders	0	3	0	6	**9**

at Oakland–Alameda County Coliseum, Oakland, California

- Date: November 11
- Game time: 1:00 pm. PST
- Game weather: 62 °F (17 °C)
- Game attendance: 47,535
- Referee: Bernie Ulman
- Pro-Football-Reference.com

Game information

**First quarter**

- No scoring

**Second quarter**

- PIT – Ron Shanklin 14-yard pass from Terry Hanratty (Roy Gerela kick). Steelers 7–0.
- OAK – George Blanda 40-yard field goal. Steelers 7–3.

**Third quarter**

- PIT – Franco Harris 1-yard run (Roy Gerela kick). Steelers 14–3.

**Fourth quarter**

- PIT – Roy Gerela 17-yard field goal. Steelers 17–3.
- OAK – Fred Biletnikoff 27-yard pass from Daryle Lamonica (kick failed). Steelers 17–9.

Top passers

- PIT – Terry Hanratty – 6/19, 86 yards, TD, INT
- OAK – Daryle Lamonica – 13/31, 236 yards, TD, 4 INT

Top rushers

- PIT – Franco Harris – 20 rushes, 77 yards, TD
- OAK – Charlie Smith – 13 rushes, 74 yards

Top receivers

- PIT – Ron Shanklin – 2 receptions, 41 yards, TD
- OAK – Fred Biletnikoff – 4 receptions, 105 yards, TD

==== Week 10 vs. Browns ====
Week Ten: Cleveland Browns (5–3–1) at Oakland Raiders (5–3–1)

Quarter	1	2	3	4	Total
**Browns**	0	7	0	0	**7**
Raiders	0	0	0	3	**3**

at Oakland–Alameda County Coliseum, Oakland, California

- Date: November 18
- Game time: 1:00 pm. PST
- Game weather: 53 °F (12 °C)
- Game attendance: 47,398
- Box Score

Game information

**First quarter**

- No scoring

**Second quarter**

- CLE – Fair Hooker 7-yard pass from Mike Phipps (Don Cockroft kick). Browns 7–0.

**Third quarter**

- No scoring

**Fourth quarter**

- OAK – George Blanda 23-yard field goal. Browns 7–3.

Top passers

- CLE – Mike Phipps – 9/17, 96 yards, TD
- OAK – Ken Stabler – 17/33, 122 yards

Top rushers

- CLE – Ken Brown – 23 rushes, 82 yards
- OAK – Marv Hubbard – 12 rushes, 48 yards

Top receivers

- CLE – Frank Pitts – 4 receptions, 62 yards
- OAK – Cliff Branch – 4 receptions, 43 yards

==== Week 11 vs. Chargers ====
Week Eleven: San Diego Chargers (2–7–1) at Oakland Raiders (5–4–1)

Quarter	1	2	3	4	Total
Chargers	3	0	0	0	**3**
**Raiders**	7	17	7	0	**31**

at Oakland–Alameda County Coliseum, Oakland, California

- Date: November 25
- Game time: 1:00 pm. PST
- Game weather: 49 °F (9 °C)
- Game attendance: 40,195
- Box Score

Game information

**First quarter**

- OAK – George Atkinson 59-yard fumble return (George Blanda kick). Raiders 7–0.
- SD – Dennis Partee 14-yard field goal. Raiders 7–3.

**Second quarter**

- OAK – George Blanda 34-yard field goal. Raiders 10–3.
- OAK – Charlie Smith 7-yard run (George Blanda kick). Raiders 17–3.
- OAK – Fred Biletnikoff 16-yard pass from Ken Stabler (George Blanda kick). Raiders 24–3.

**Third quarter**

- OAK – Bob Moore 1-yard pass from Ken Stabler (George Blanda kick). Raiders 31–3.

**Fourth quarter**

- No scoring

Top passers

- SD – Wayne Clark – 6/15, 121 yards, INT
- OAK – Ken Stabler – 12/22, 165 yards, 2 TD, INT

Top rushers

- SD – Cid Edwards – 16 rushes, 81 yards
- OAK – Charlie Smith – 14 rushes, 66 yards

Top receivers

- SD – Clinton Jones – 2 receptions, 47 yards
- OAK – Mike Siani – 4 receptions, 90 yards

==== Week 12 at Oilers ====
Week Twelve: Oakland Raiders (6–4–1) at Houston Oilers (1–10)

Quarter	1	2	3	4	Total
**Raiders**	0	0	3	14	**17**
Oilers	0	3	0	3	**6**

at Houston Astrodome, Houston, Texas

- Date: December 2
- Game time: 1:00 pm. CST
- Game weather: Indoors (dome)
- Game attendance: 25,801
- Box Score

Game information

**First quarter**

- No scoring

**Second quarter**

- HOU – Skip Butler 44-yard field goal. Oilers 3–0.

**Third quarter**

- OAK – George Blanda 9-yard field goal. Tie 3–3.

**Fourth quarter**

- OAK – Fred Biletnikoff 21-yard pass from Ken Stabler (George Blanda kick). Raiders 10–3.
- HOU – Skip Butler 16-yard field goal. Raiders 10–6.
- OAK – Marv Hubbard 4-yard run (George Blanda kick). Raiders 17–6.

Top passers

- OAK – Ken Stabler – 15/26, 177 yards, TD, 3 INT
- HOU – Dan Pastorini – 22/36, 243 yards

Top rushers

- OAK – Marv Hubbard – 11 rushes, 121 yards, TD
- HOU – Fred Willis – 22 rushes, 80 yards

Top receivers

- OAK – Mike Siani – 4 receptions, 64 yards
- HOU – Ken Burrough – 7 receptions, 80 yards

==== Week 13 vs. Chiefs ====
Week Thirteen: Kansas City Chiefs (6–4–2) at Oakland Raiders (7–4–1)

Quarter	1	2	3	4	Total
Chiefs	0	0	7	0	**7**
**Raiders**	7	13	3	14	**37**

at Oakland–Alameda County Coliseum, Oakland, California

- Date: December 8
- Game time: 1:00 pm. PST
- Game weather: 51 °F (11 °C)
- Game attendance: 53,945
- Box Score

Game information

**First quarter**

- OAK – Fred Biletnikoff 9-yard pass from Ken Stabler (George Blanda kick). Raiders 7–0.

**Second quarter**

- OAK – Marv Hubbard 31-yard run (George Blanda kick). Raiders 14–0.
- OAK – George Blanda 20-yard field goal. Raiders 17–0.
- OAK – George Blanda 28-yard field goal. Raiders 20–0.

**Third quarter**

- OAK – George Blanda 27-yard field goal. Raiders 23–0.
- KC – Mike Livingston 17-yard run (Jan Stenerud kick). Raiders 23–7.

**Fourth quarter**

- OAK – Charlie Smith 10-yard run (George Blanda kick). Raiders 30–7.
- OAK – Cliff Branch 3-yard pass from Ken Stabler (George Blanda kick). Raiders 37–7.

Top passers

- KC – Mike Livingston – 6/14, 66 yards, INT
- OAK – Ken Stabler – 10/19, 88 yards, 2 TD

Top rushers

- KC – Willie Ellison – 6 rushes, 15 yards
- OAK – Marv Hubbard – 25 rushes, 115 yards, TD

Top receivers

- KC – Ed Podolak – 7 receptions, 65 yards
- OAK – Mike Siani – 5 receptions, 43 yards

==== Week 14 vs. Broncos ====
Week Fourteen: Denver Broncos (7–4–2) at Oakland Raiders (8–4–1)

Quarter	1	2	3	4	Total
Broncos	0	3	7	7	**17**
**Raiders**	7	7	0	7	**21**

at Oakland–Alameda County Coliseum, Oakland, California

- Date: December 16
- Game time: 1:00 pm. PST
- Game weather: 47 °F (8 °C)
- Game attendance: 51,910
- Box Score

Game information

**First quarter**

- OAK – Charlie Smith 1-yard run (George Blanda kick). Raiders 7–0.

**Second quarter**

- OAK – Clarence Davis 8-yard run (George Blanda kick). Raiders 14–0.
- DEN – Jim Turner 50-yard field goal. Raiders 14–3.

**Third quarter**

- DEN – Haven Moses 13-yard pass from Charley Johnson (Jim Turner kick). Raiders 14–10.

**Fourth quarter**

- OAK – Mike Siani 31-yard pass from Ken Stabler (George Blanda kick). Raiders 21–10.
- DEN – Riley Odoms 14-yard pass from Steve Ramsey (Jim Turner kick). Raiders 21–17.

Top passers

- DEN – Charley Johnson – 11/22, 91 yards, TD, INT
- OAK – Ken Stabler – 12/20, 139 yards, TD

Top rushers

- DEN – Joe Dawkins – 12 rushes, 47 yards
- OAK – Clarence Davis – 15 rushes, 78 yards, TD

Top receivers

- DEN – Riley Odoms – 7 receptions, 68 yards, TD
- OAK – Mike Siani – 4 receptions, 62 yards, TD

=== Standings ===
AFC West
	W	L	T	PCT	DIV	CONF	PF	PA	STK
Oakland Raiders	9	4	1	.679	4–1–1	7–3–1	292	175	W4
Kansas City Chiefs	7	5	2	.571	4–2	6–4–1	231	192	W1
Denver Broncos	7	5	2	.571	3–2–1	7–2–1	354	296	L1
San Diego Chargers	2	11	1	.179	0–6	1–9–1	188	386	L4

== Playoffs ==
Round	Date	Opponent	Result	Record	Venue	Attendance
Divisional	December 22	Pittsburgh Steelers	W 33–14	1–0	Oakland–Alameda County Coliseum	51,110
AFC Championship	December 30	at Miami Dolphins	L 10–27	1–1	Miami Orange Bowl	75,105

=== Divisional ===
AFC Divisional Round: Pittsburgh Steelers (10–4) at Oakland Raiders (9–4–1)

Quarter	1	2	3	4	Total
Steelers	0	7	0	7	14
Raiders	7	3	13	10	33

at Oakland–Alameda County Coliseum, Oakland, California

- Date: December 22
- Game time: 1:00 pm. PST
- Game weather: 50 °F (10 °C)
- Game attendance: 51,110
- Box Score

Game information

First quarter

- OAK – Marv Hubbard 1-yard run (George Blanda kick). Raiders 7–0.

Second quarter

- OAK – George Blanda 25-yard field goal. Raiders 10–0.
- PIT – Barry Pearson 4-yard pass from Terry Bradshaw (Roy Gerela kick). Raiders 10–7.

Third quarter

- OAK – George Blanda 31-yard field goal. Raiders 13–7.
- OAK – George Blanda 22-yard field goal. Raiders 16–7.
- OAK – Willie Brown 54-yard interception return (George Blanda kick). Raiders 23–7.

Fourth quarter

- OAK – George Blanda 10-yard field goal. Raiders 26–7.
- PIT – Frank Lewis 26-yard pass from Terry Bradshaw (Roy Gerela kick). Raiders 26–14.
- OAK – Marv Hubbard 1-yard run (George Blanda kick). Raiders 33–14.

Top passers

- PIT – Terry Bradshaw – 12/25, 167 yards, 2 TD, 3 INT
- OAK – Ken Stabler – 14/17, 142 yards

Top rushers

- PIT – Franco Harris – 10 rushes, 29 yards
- OAK – Marv Hubbard – 20 rushes, 91 yards, TD

Top receivers

- PIT – Frank Lewis – 4 receptions, 70 yards, TD
- OAK – Mike Siani – 5 receptions, 68 yards

Raiders win and went to the AFC Championship Game but lost to the eventual Super Bowl Champion Miami Dolphins 27-10.

=== Conference Championship ===
AFC Championship: Oakland Raiders (9–4–1) at Miami Dolphins (12–2)

Quarter	1	2	3	4	Total
Raiders	0	0	10	0	10
Dolphins	7	7	3	10	27

at Orange Bowl, Miami, Florida

- Date: December 30
- Game time: 4:00 pm. EST
- Game weather: 74 °F (23 °C)
- Game attendance: 75,105
- Box Score

Game information

First quarter

- MIA – Larry Csonka 11-yard run (Garo Yepremian kick). Dolphins 7–0.

Second quarter

- MIA – Larry Csonka 2-yard run (Garo Yepremian kick). Dolphins 14–0.

Third quarter

- OAK – George Blanda 21-yard field goal. Dolphins 14–3.
- MIA – Garo Yepremian 42-yard field goal. Dolphins 17–3.
- OAK – Mike Siani 25-yard pass from Ken Stabler (George Blanda kick). Dolphins 17–10.

Fourth quarter

- MIA – Garo Yepremian 27-yard field goal. Dolphins 20–10.
- MIA – Larry Csonka 2-yard run (Garo Yepremian kick). Dolphins 27–10.

Top passers

- OAK – Ken Stabler – 15/23, 129 yards, TD, INT
- MIA – Bob Griese – 3/6, 34 yards, INT

Top rushers

- OAK – Marv Hubbard – 10 rushes, 54 yards
- MIA – Larry Csonka – 29 rushes, 117 yards, 3 TD

Top receivers

- OAK – Mike Siani – 3 receptions, 45 yards, TD
- MIA – Paul Warfield – 1 reception, 27 yards
