= 1974 Pro Bowl =

National Football League all-star game

1974 NFL Pro Bowl
NFC	AFC
13	15
Head coach: Tom Landry (Dallas Cowboys)	Head coach: John Madden (Oakland Raiders)
	1	2	3	4	Total
NFC	0	10	0	3	13
AFC	3	3	3	6	15
- Date: January 20, 1974
- Stadium: Arrowhead Stadium; Kansas City, Missouri
- MVP: Garo Yepremian (Miami Dolphins)
- Referee: Jack Reader
- Attendance: 51,484

TV in the United States
- Network: NBC
- Announcers: Curt Gowdy, Al DeRogatis

The 1974 Pro Bowl was the NFL's 24th annual all-star game which featured the outstanding performers from the 1973 season. The game was played on Sunday, January 20, 1974, at Arrowhead Stadium in Kansas City, Missouri. The final score was AFC 15, NFC 13. The attendance for the game was 51,484 though nearly 70,000 tickets were sold.

John Madden of the Oakland Raiders coached the AFC while the NFC was led by the Dallas Cowboys' Tom Landry.

Placekicker Garo Yepremian of the Miami Dolphins was the game's MVP. Yepremian set a Pro Bowl record which still stands as of 2018, kicking five field goals in the game. This was the last American football game to have the goal posts on the goal line, before being moved back to the endline the next year to make field goals harder for teams to make. The referee for the game was Jack Reader, who retired from on-field work after the Pro Bowl to accept a position as the NFL's Assistant Supervisor of Officials.

Players on the winning AFC team each received $2,000 while the NFC participants took home $1,500.

Due to an ice storm and brutally cold temperatures the week leading up to the game, the game's participants worked out at the facilities of the San Diego Chargers. On game day, the temperature soared to 41 °F (5 °C), melting most of the ice and snow that accumulated during the week.

== AFC roster ==
=== Offense ===
Position	Starter(s)	Reserve(s)
Quarterback	12 Ken Stabler, Oakland	12 Bob Griese, Miami
Running back	32 O. J. Simpson, Buffalo	44 Floyd Little, Denver; 22 Mercury Morris, Miami
Fullback	39 Larry Csonka, Miami	32 Franco Harris, Pittsburgh; 44 Marv Hubbard, Oakland
Wide receivers	25 Fred Biletnikoff, Oakland; 27 Paul Warfield, Miami	83 Jerome Barkum, N.Y. Jets; 85 Isaac Curtis, Cincinnati; 25 Haven Moses, Denver; 25 Ron Shanklin, Pittsburgh
Tight end	88 Riley Odoms, Denver	84 Bob Trumpy, Cincinnati
Offensive tackle	75 Winston Hill, N.Y. Jets; 78 Art Shell, Oakland	78 Dave Foley, Buffalo; 79 Wayne Moore, Miami
Offensive guard	66 Larry Little, Miami; 63 Gene Upshaw, Oakland	66 Bruce Van Dyke, Pittsburgh
Center	62 Jim Langer, Miami	58 Jack Rudnay, Kansas City

=== Defense ===
Position	Starter(s)	Reserve(s)
Defensive end	65 Elvin Bethea, Houston; 68 L. C. Greenwood, Pittsburgh	84 Bill Stanfill, Miami; 78 Dwight White, Pittsburgh
Defensive tackle	75 Joe Greene, Pittsburgh; 70 Paul Smith, Denver	74 Mike Reid, Cincinnati; 72 Jerry Sherk, Cleveland
Outside linebacker	34 Andy Russell, Pittsburgh; 83 Ted Hendricks, Baltimore	59 Jack Ham, Pittsburgh; 41 Phil Villapiano, Oakland
Inside linebacker	63 Willie Lanier, Kansas City	85 Nick Buoniconti, Miami
Cornerback	24 Willie Brown, Oakland; 20 Robert James, Buffalo	22 Clarence Scott, Cleveland
Free safety	13 Jake Scott, Miami	31 Jack Tatum, Oakland
Strong safety	40 Dick Anderson, Miami	

=== Special teams ===
Position	Starter(s)	Reserve(s)
Punter	8 Ray Guy, Oakland	
Placekicker	1 Garo Yepremian, Miami	
Kick returner	34 Greg Pruitt, Cleveland	

== NFC roster ==
=== Offense ===
Position	Starter(s)	Reserve(s)
Quarterback	21 John Hadl, Los Angeles	5 Roman Gabriel, Philadelphia
Running back	44 Chuck Foreman, Minnesota	35 Calvin Hill, Dallas; 30 Lawrence McCutcheon, Los Angeles
Fullback	42 John Brockington, Green Bay	45 Jim Bertelsen, Los Angeles
Wide receivers	29 Harold Jackson, Los Angeles; 42 Charley Taylor, Washington	17 Harold Carmichael, Philadelphia; 42 John Gilliam, Minnesota
Tight end	86 Charle Young, Philadelphia	82 Ted Kwalick, San Francisco
Offensive tackle	70 Rayfield Wright, Dallas; 73 Ron Yary, Minnesota	82 George Kunz, Atlanta
Offensive guard	65 Tom Mack, Los Angeles; 76 John Niland, Dallas	68 Gale Gillingham, Green Bay; 69 Woody Peoples, San Francisco
Center	75 Forrest Blue, San Francisco	64 Ed Flanagan, Detroit

=== Defense ===
Position	Starter(s)	Reserve(s)
Defensive end	81 Carl Eller, Minnesota; 87 Claude Humphrey, Atlanta	85 Jack Youngblood, Los Angeles; 71 John Zook, Atlanta
Defensive tackle	74 Merlin Olsen, Los Angeles; 88 Alan Page, Minnesota	60 Wally Chambers, Chicago; 74 Bob Lilly, Dallas
Outside linebacker	55 Chris Hanburger, Washington; 64 Dave Wilcox, San Francisco	58 Isiah Robertson, Los Angeles
Inside linebacker	50 Jeff Siemon, Minnesota	50 Jim Carter, Green Bay; 55 Lee Roy Jordan, Dallas
Cornerback	20 Lem Barney, Detroit; 20 Mel Renfro, Dallas	48 Ken Ellis, Green Bay
Free safety	22 Paul Krause, Minnesota	28 Bill Bradley, Philadelphia
Strong safety	27 Ken Houston, Washington	

=== Special teams ===
Position	Starter(s)	Reserve(s)
Punter	13 Tom Wittum, San Francisco	
Placekicker	12 Nick Mike-Mayer, Atlanta	
Kick returner	28 Herb Mul-Key, Washington	
