= Brian McConnell (American football) =

American football player (born 1950)

No. 82, 59
- Position: Linebacker

Personal information
- Born: January 21, 1950 (age 76); Passaic, New Jersey, U.S.
- Listed height: 6 ft 4 in (1.93 m)
- Listed weight: 220 lb (100 kg)

Career information
- High school: Peddie School
- College: Michigan State
- NFL draft: 1973: 7th round, 162nd overall pick

Career history
- Buffalo Bills (1973); Houston Oilers (1973)

Awards and highlights
- Second-team All-Big Ten (1972)
- Stats at Pro Football Reference

Brian Thomas McConnell (born January 21, 1950) is an American former professional football player who was a linebacker for the Buffalo Bills and the Houston Oilers of the National Football League (NFL). He played college football for the Michigan State Spartans.

McConnell played two years in Peddie School in Hightstown, New Jersey, mostly as an offensive lineman, becoming team captain, earning high school All-American honors, and graduating in 1969. He attended Michigan State University, graduating in 1973. He was drafted in the seventh round (162nd overall) to the Buffalo Bills where he played tight end, and was traded to the Houston Oilers where he would play 7 games that season as a linebacker. In 1974 he was slated to report to the New England Patriots camp, but walked out as part of the strike that year. He finished his NFL career with the Miami Dolphins in 1977.

== Post-football career ==
After leaving football, McConnell got his MBA at Stanford University. He serves as the vice-president of the NFL Alumni Association, Northern California Chapter. He is a partner in HPN Neurologic, a company that works on concussion diagnostics and treatment. In 2018, he posted that he survived a transplant to deal with liver cancer.
