= Wayne Moore (American football) =

American football player (1945–1989)

No. 78, 79
- Position: Offensive tackle

Personal information
- Born: August 17, 1945; Beaumont, Texas, U.S.
- Died: August 19, 1989 (aged 44); Miami, Florida, U.S.
- Listed height: 6 ft 7 in (2.01 m)
- Listed weight: 265 lb (120 kg)

Career information
- High school: Charlton-Pollard (Beaumont)
- College: Lamar (1965-1968)
- NFL draft: 1969: undrafted

Career history
- Sacramento Capitols (1969); San Francisco 49ers (1969)*; Miami Dolphins (1970–1978)
- * Offseason or practice squad member only

Awards and highlights
- 2× Super Bowl champion (VII, VIII); Pro Bowl (1973)

Career NFL statistics
- Games played: 98
- Games started: 72
- Fumble recoveries: 1
- Stats at Pro Football Reference

Solomon Wayne Moore (August 17, 1945 – August 19, 1989) was an American professional football player who was an offensive tackle for nine seasons with the Miami Dolphins of the National Football League (NFL). He played both college football and basketball for the Lamar Cardinals. He was a member of the Dolphins' undefeated team in 1972.

== Early life ==
Moore attended Charlton-Pollard High School. He played defensive end for Texas High School Hall of Fame coach Willie Ray Smith Sr. and was a teammate of Smith's son, Bubba Smith. He also was a forward in basketball, helping his team win the Prairie View Interscholastic League state championship in 1964.

He accepted a basketball scholarship to play at Lamar University in his hometown, under coach Jack Martin. In 1968, he led the team with 302 total rebounds and averaged 12.6 points a game. He finished his college career with 718 rebounds.

In 1993, Moore was posthumously enshrined in the Cardinal Hall of Honor for his achievements on the basketball court.

== Professional career ==
=== San Francisco 49ers ===
In 1969, he was signed as an undrafted free agent by the San Francisco 49ers, after 49ers player Johnny Fuller recommended him to scout John Nikchivich. He was tried at tight end and offensive tackle, before being released during preseason and signed to the taxi squad.

In 1970, he was released before the season started and the 49ers tried to pass him through waivers by using the name Solomon Moore and putting defensive tackle as his position on the waiver list.

=== Miami Dolphins ===
In 1970, the Dolphins' new offensive line coach Monte Clark discovered Solomon was Moore's legal first name and claimed the offensive tackle off waivers from his former team, the San Francisco 49ers,

Moore would become an integral part of the Dolphins' success in the 1970s decade, while starting at left tackle. Over his career, he played in three Super Bowls (VI, VII, and VIII) with the Dolphins and was selected to the Pro Bowl in 1973.

== Personal life ==
After his retirement, Moore became a salesman for a construction company. On August 19, 1989, two days after his 44th birthday, he suffered a heart attack at his home in Miami and was pronounced dead at Coral Reef Hospital that afternoon.
