= Ron Mayo =

American football player (born 1950)

- Mayo in 1975

No. 80, 83
- Position: Tight end

Personal information
- Born: October 11, 1950 (age 76); Washington D.C., U.S.
- Listed height: 6 ft 2 in (1.88 m)
- Listed weight: 222 lb (101 kg)

Career information
- High school: Joel Elias Spingarn (Washington, D.C.)
- College: Morgan State
- NFL draft: 1973: 6th round, 131st overall pick

Career history
- Houston Oilers (1973); Baltimore Colts (1974); Buffalo Bills (1975)*; Green Bay Packers (1975)*; New England Patriots (1975)*
- * Offseason or practice squad member only

Career NFL statistics
- Games played: 22
- Stats at Pro Football Reference

Ronald Mayo (born October 11, 1950) is an American former professional football player who was a tight end for two seasons in the National Football League (NFL) for the Houston Oilers and Baltimore Colts. He played college football for the Morgan State Bears and was selected by the Oilers in the sixth round of the 1973 NFL draft.
