= Glenn Scolnik =

American football player (born 1951)

No. 86, 79
- Position: Wide receiver

Personal information
- Born: June 16, 1951 (age 75); Hammond, Indiana, U.S.
- Listed height: 6 ft 3 in (1.91 m)
- Listed weight: 204 lb (93 kg)

Career information
- High school: Munster (Munster, Indiana)
- College: Indiana (1969–1972)
- NFL draft: 1973: 6th round, 154th overall pick

Career history
- Pittsburgh Steelers (1973); New York Giants (1974)*; Calgary Stampeders (1975); Hamilton Tiger-Cats (1976)
- * Offseason or practice squad member only

Awards and highlights
- First-team All-Big Ten (1972)
- Stats at Pro Football Reference

Glenn H. Scolnik (born June 16, 1951) is an American former professional football player who was a wide receiver for the Pittsburgh Steelers of the National Football League (NFL). He played college football for the Indiana Hoosiers and was selected by the Steelers in the sixth round of the 1973 NFL draft. He became a vegetarian in 1972.

== Early life ==
Glenn H. Scolnik was born on June 16, 1951, in Hammond, Indiana. He played high school football at Munster High School in Munster, Indiana, earning all-state honors.

== College career ==
Scolnik enrolled at Indiana University Bloomington to play college football for the Hoosiers. He was on the freshman team in 1969 and was a three-year varsity letterman from 1970 to 1972. He earned Associated Press and United Press International first-team All-Big Ten Conference honors during the 1972 season after leading the conference in receptions (53), receiving yards (727), and receiving touchdowns (6). Scolnik was also named an Academic All-American in 1972. He finished his college career with 79 catches for 1,159 yards and seven touchdowns. He was inducted into the school's athletics hall of fame in 2018. He graduated with a business degree.

== Professional career ==
Scolnik was selected by the Pittsburgh Steelers in the sixth round, with the 154th overall pick, of the 1973 NFL draft. He played in all six preseason games, catching five passes in total. He was waived on September 11 but re-signed after clearing waivers. He was on the active roster for the regular season opener but did not play in it. He was then moved to the team's taxi squad. After Chuck Dicus suffered an injury, Scolnik was promoted to the active roster for the October 21 game against the New York Jets. He played in the game in a reserve role and did not record any statistics. Scolnik was deactivated on October 24 after pulling his hamstring in practice.

On August 7, 1974, Scolnik was traded to the New York Giants for an undisclosed draft pick. He was released before the regular season.

On April 11, 1975, Scolnik signed with the Calgary Stampeders of the Canadian Football League (CFL). Calgary head coach Bob Baker was Scolnik's receivers coach at Indiana. Scolnik caught the game-winning touchdown on July 30 against the BC Lions. On September 28 against the Edmonton Eskimos, he was ejected from the game for joining a fight. His Stampeder teammates nicknamed him "Bones" due to being skinny. Scolnik dressed in all 16 games for the Stampeders in 1975, catching 29 passes for 374 yards and three touchdowns as the team went 6–10. He was released on July 6, 1976, after the second game of the 1976 preseason.

Scolnik then signed with the CFL's Hamilton Tiger-Cats a few days later. He dressed in four regular season games for the Tiger-Cats, recording eight receptions for 134 yards and one touchdown. On August 19, 1976, it was reported that he had been released.

== Personal life ==
Scolnik enrolled at Duquesne University Law School while still playing for the Steelers. He graduated from Indiana University School of Law in 1978, and became a lawyer.

=== Vegetarianism ===
Prior to spring drills at Indiana in 1972, Scolnik decided to become a vegetarian, stating "I thought I was destroying my body. I wasn't getting enough sleep. I was doing a lot of drinking and carousing around. I wanted to clean up my body." In November 1973, the San Francisco Chronicle noted that he was likely the NFL's only vegetarian. Scolnik said a lot of players called him "Tomato" or "Lettuce Head" but he did sit down and discuss his eating habits with a few players who were genuinely interested. Scolnik said that Steelers' coaches tried to get him to eat meat but he declined. He said "I don't think I'm in the minority. The other 999 in pro football are in the minority. The majority of the people in the world don't eat meat. It's not right to eat as much meat as most Americans eat. They dig their graves with their teeth."
