= Charlie Smith (running back) =

American football player (born 1946)

No. 23
- Position: Running back

Personal information
- Born: January 18, 1946 (age 80); Natchez, Mississippi, U.S.
- Listed height: 6 ft 0 in (1.83 m)
- Listed weight: 205 lb (93 kg)

Career information
- High school: Castlemont (Oakland, California)
- College: Utah
- NFL draft: 1968: 4th round, 110th overall pick

Career history
- Oakland Raiders (1968-1974); San Diego Chargers (1975)

Career NFL statistics
- Rushing yards: 3,351
- Rushing average: 3.9
- Receptions: 141
- Receiving yards: 1,596
- Total touchdowns: 34
- Stats at Pro Football Reference

Charles Henry Smith (born January 18, 1946) is an American former professional football player who was a running back in the American Football League (AFL) and National Football League (NFL). He played two seasons for the AFL 's Oakland Raiders (1968–1969), and five for the National Football League (NFL)'s Raiders (1970–1974). He also played for the NFL's San Diego Chargers in 1975. He attended Castlemont High School in Oakland, California, and then played college football for the Utah Utes.

Smith scored the go-ahead touchdown in the famous 1968 Heidi Game between the Raiders and New York Jets. Most of the country didn't see the touchdown because NBC had cut away from the game, at 7 pm, to the film Heidi.

== NFL/AFL career statistics ==
Legend
	Led the league
**Bold**	Career high

=== Regular season ===
Year	Team	Games		Rushing					Receiving				
Year	Team	GP	GS	Att	Yds	Avg	Lng	TD	Rec	Yds	Avg	Lng	TD
1968	OAK	14	3	95	504	**5.3**	**65**	5	22	321	14.6	43	**2**
1969	OAK	14	14	**177**	600	3.4	26	2	**30**	322	10.7	32	**2**
1970	OAK	14	14	168	681	4.1	24	3	23	173	7.5	27	**2**
1971	OAK	8	0	11	4	0.4	8	1	2	67	**33.5**	**44**	0
1972	OAK	14	13	170	**686**	4.0	28	**8**	28	**353**	12.6	43	**2**
1973	OAK	14	14	173	682	3.9	19	4	28	260	9.3	20	1
1974	OAK	13	7	64	194	3.0	22	1	8	100	12.5	30	1
1975	SDG	4	0	0	0	0.0	0	0	0	0	0.0	0	0
		95	65	858	3,351	3.9	65	24	141	1,596	11.3	44	10

=== Postseason ===
Year	Team	Games		Rushing					Receiving				
Year	Team	GP	GS	Att	Yds	Avg	Lng	TD	Rec	Yds	Avg	Lng	TD
1968	OAK	2	2	18	75	4.2	32	0	5	52	10.4	26	0
1969	OAK	2	2	20	34	1.7	9	**1**	**12**	**189**	15.8	**60**	**1**
1970	OAK	2	2	18	81	**4.5**	21	0	3	30	10.0	14	0
1972	OAK	1	1	14	57	4.1	9	0	2	8	4.0	5	0
1973	OAK	2	2	**27**	**108**	4.0	**40**	0	7	53	7.6	14	0
1974	OAK	2	0	0	0	0.0	0	0	2	35	**17.5**	31	**1**
		11	9	97	355	3.7	40	1	31	367	11.8	60	2

== Personal life ==
He is the father of former NFL tight end Kevin Smith.

== See also ==
- Other American Football League players
