= Bob Gresham =

American football player (born 1948)

No. 35, 36
- Position: Running back

Personal information
- Born: July 9, 1948 (age 78); Porter, Alabama, U.S.
- Listed height: 5 ft 11 in (1.80 m)
- Listed weight: 195 lb (88 kg)

Career information
- High school: Big Creek (War, West Virginia)
- College: West Virginia
- NFL draft: 1971: 8th round, 201st overall pick

Career history
- New Orleans Saints (1971–1972); Houston Oilers (1973–1974); New York Jets (1975–1976)

Career NFL statistics
- Rushing attempts: 410
- Rushing yards: 1,360
- Receptions: 90
- Receiving yards: 728
- Total TDs: 14
- Stats at Pro Football Reference

Robert Clark Gresham (born July 9, 1948) is an American former professional football player who was a running back in the National Football League (NFL). He played for the New Orleans Saints, Houston Oilers, and New York Jets. He was selected in the eighth round of the 1971 NFL draft after playing college football for the West Virginia Mountaineers.
