= Fred Biletnikoff =

American gridiron football player and coach (born 1943)

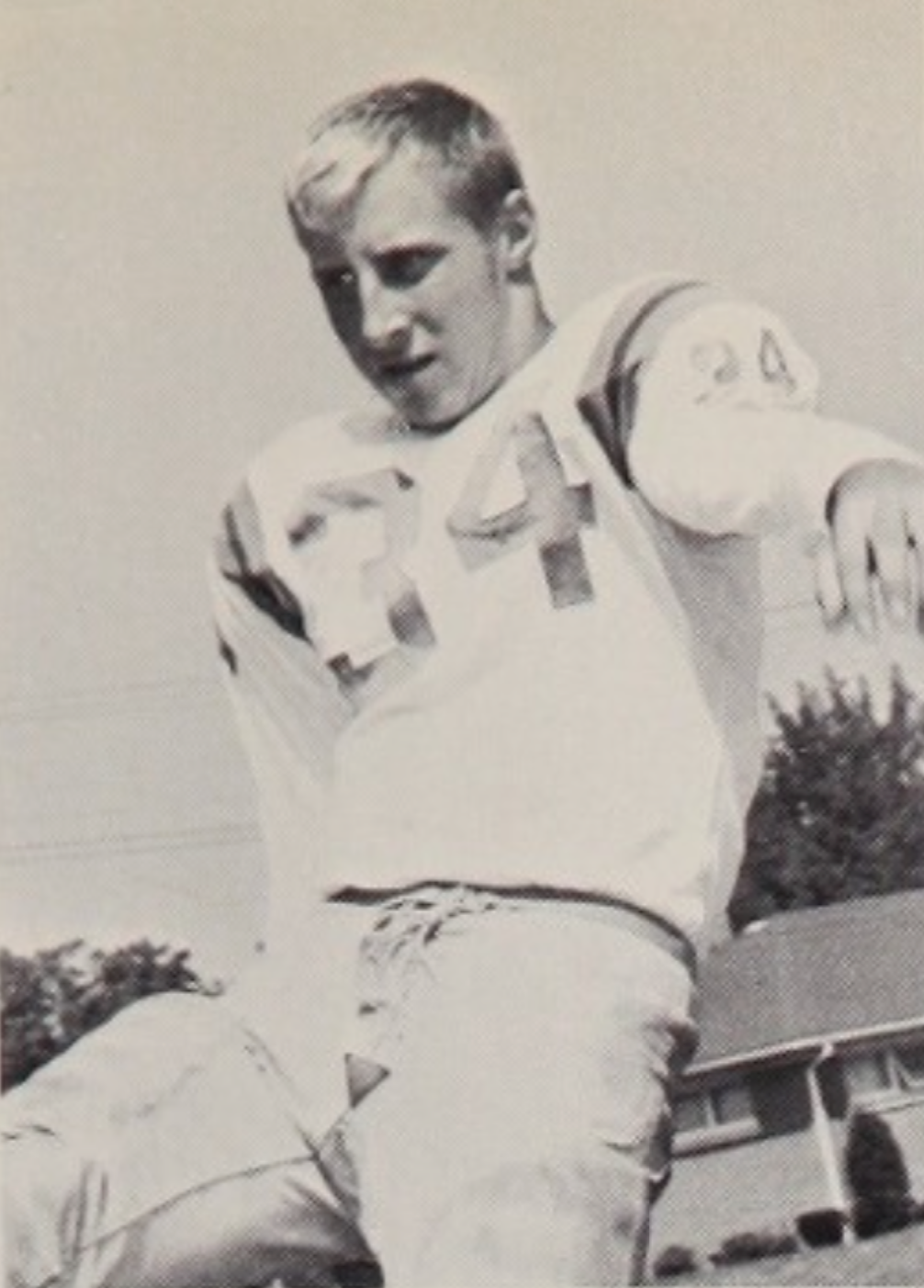
- Biletnikoff in 1961

No. 14, 25
- Position: Wide receiver

Personal information
- Born: February 23, 1943 (age 83); Erie, Pennsylvania, U.S.
- Listed height: 6 ft 1 in (1.85 m)
- Listed weight: 190 lb (86 kg)

Career information
- High school: Technical Memorial (Erie)
- College: Florida State (1962–1964)
- NFL draft: 1965: 3rd round, 39th overall pick
- AFL draft: 1965: 2nd round, 11th overall pick

Career history

Playing
- Oakland Raiders (1965–1978); Montreal Alouettes (1980)

Coaching
- Montreal Alouettes (1980) Assistant coach; Orange Glen HS (CA) (1982) Assistant coach; Palomar (1983) Wide receivers coach; Diablo Valley (1984) Wide receivers coach; Oakland Invaders (1985) Wide receivers coach; Arizona Wranglers (1986) Wide receivers coach; Calgary Stampeders (1987–1988) Wide receivers coach; Los Angeles / Oakland Raiders (1989–2006) Wide receivers coach

Awards and highlights
- As a player: Super Bowl champion (XI); AFL champion (1967); Super Bowl MVP (XI); 2× First-team All-Pro (1969, 1972); 4× Pro Bowl (1970, 1971, 1973, 1974); 2× AFL All-Star (1967, 1969); NFL receptions leader (1971); Consensus All-American (1964); Florida State Seminoles Jersey No. 25 honored

Career AFL/NFL statistics
- Receptions: 589
- Receiving yards: 8,974
- Receiving touchdowns: 76
- Stats at Pro Football Reference
- Pro Football Hall of Fame
- College Football Hall of Fame

Frederick Biletnikoff (born February 23, 1943) is an American former professional football player and coach. He played as a wide receiver for the Oakland Raiders in the American Football League (AFL) and National Football League (NFL) for 14 seasons and later was an assistant coach with the team. He retired as an NFL player after the 1978 season then played one more season in the Canadian Football League (CFL) for the Montreal Alouettes in 1980. While he lacked the breakaway speed to be a deep-play threat, Biletnikoff was one of the most sure-handed and consistent receivers of his day with a propensity for making spectacular catches. He was also known for running smooth, precise pass routes. He is a member of both the Pro Football Hall of Fame (1988) and College Football Hall of Fame (1991).

Biletnikoff attended Florida State University, where he played college football for the Florida State Seminoles football team and earned consensus All-American honors after leading the country in receiving yards and receiving touchdowns as a senior. The Fred Biletnikoff Award, given annually to the most outstanding receiver in NCAA Division I FBS, is named in his honor.

Through his AFL and NFL career, Biletnikoff had 589 receptions for 8,974 yards and 76 touchdowns and had a then-league-record 10 straight seasons of 40 or more receptions during a time when teams emphasized running over passing. With the Raiders, Biletnikoff played in the second AFL–NFL World Championship game—retroactively known as Super Bowl II—and in Super Bowl XI, in which he was named the game's MVP in a victory over the Minnesota Vikings. A four-time Pro Bowl selection, he also played two AFL All-Star games, three AFL title games and five AFC championship games.

== Early life ==
Biletnikoff was born and raised in Erie, Pennsylvania, the son of Natalie (Karuba) and Ephriam Biletnikoff. All four of his grandparents were Russian immigrants. In Erie, Biletnikoff attended what was then Technical Memorial High School, now Erie High School, whose athletic field now bears his name. In high school, Biletnikoff excelled in football, basketball, baseball, and track. He was a champion high jumper and earned All-City honors in basketball and baseball. His younger brother Bob was a starting quarterback for the Miami Hurricanes in the mid-1960s.

== College career ==
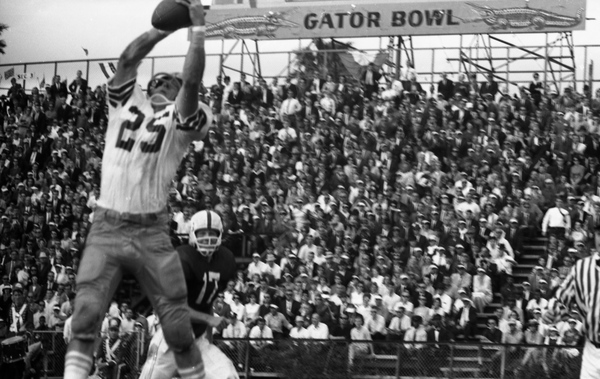
Biletnikoff making a catch during a game against the University of Oklahoma at the Gator Bowl in 1965

Biletnikoff turned down other notable offers to attend Florida State University in Tallahassee. He missed several games during his first varsity season in 1962 with a broken foot. He played on both sides of the ball his junior season, leading the team in receptions and interceptions. That year, he returned an interception 99 yards for a touchdown off a pass thrown by George Mira of the Miami Hurricanes, a record which stood until 1987, when Deion Sanders broke it by one yard. As a senior in 1964, Biletnikoff led the nation with 1,179 receiving yards and 15 touchdowns, and finished second in receptions (70) and scoring (90). One of his touchdowns came in the first quarter against the Florida Gators, which helped the Seminoles earn their first victory in the in-state rivalry, 16–7. The Seminoles finished the year with a 36–19 victory over Oklahoma in the Gator Bowl, in which Biletnikoff set school records with 13 receptions for 194 yards and four touchdowns. He was a consensus pick for the 1964 College Football All-America Team, receiving first-team honors from four official selectors: the Associated Press, Central Press Association, Football Writers Association of America, and Newspaper Enterprise Association. He was Florida State's first consensus All-American in football. Biletnikoff compiled 100 receptions for 1,655 yards and 20 touchdowns in his career with the Seminoles, which at the time were all school records. While in college Fred also joined the Lambda Chi Alpha fraternity. At the end of the third quarter of the January 1st 1965 Gator Bowl, Oakland Raiders coach Al Davis left the pressbox for a position behind the FSU bench. He expected to sign Biletnikoff who the Raiders had drafted in second round of the 1965 AFL draft as soon as the game ended. Biletnikoff made a handshake deal and signed his professional contract with Al Davis on the field, under the goalposts, immediately following the 1965 Gator Bowl in Jacksonville, Florida. Lou Creekmur, scout for the Detroit Lions, who owned the NFL rights to Biletnikoff, asked, "No chance for Detroit, Fred?" "No, sir, I've decided to sign with Oakland," replied Fred. The instant the game ended, Davis got the wide receiver's signature on a contract.

== Professional career ==
After graduating from FSU, he was selected by the Oakland Raiders in the second round of the 1965 AFL draft, 11th overall and by the Detroit Lions in the third round of the 1965 NFL draft, the 39th overall selection. Biletnikoff signed with the Raiders, where he played for fourteen seasons. With Oakland, he was nicknamed "Coyote", and "Doctor Zhivago" because of his Russian heritage. In 1966, he caught his first touchdown pass, thrown by quarterback Tom Flores, who later became the Raiders' head coach the season after Biletnikoff was released by the team.

Although he lacked the breakaway speed to be a deep threat, Biletnikoff's precise pass routes and sure hands made him one of the most consistent receivers of his day, and a favorite target of Raiders quarterbacks Daryle Lamonica and Ken Stabler. "I like catching passes", he explained. "And I like playing outside. I would be lost if I were ever told to do anything on a football field except catch passes." Through his career he recorded 589 receptions, and had a league record 10 straight seasons of 40 or more receptions from 1967 to 1976, since surpassed by many players. Following the retirement of Charley Taylor, Biletnikoff spent the 1978 season (his last) as the NFL's active leader in career receiving yards, and retired ranked 5th all-time.

Biletnikoff popularized the use of Stickum, an adhesive that many players applied to their hands to assist with catching and gripping the ball. He would apply the substance all over his body and uniform prior to a game, a practice that was later picked up by Raiders cornerback Lester Hayes after Biletnikoff introduced him to it. The use of Stickum was banned by the NFL in 1981.

In his rookie season, Biletnikoff played primarily on special teams. He did not see playing time on offense until the seventh game of the year, against the Boston Patriots, in which he caught seven passes for 118 yards. His production increased significantly with Oakland's acquisition of quarterback Daryle Lamonica in 1967. That year, he caught 40 passes for 876 yards and five touchdowns and led the league with an average of 21.9 yards per reception. He was invited to play in the 1967 AFL All-Star Game. In that year's AFL championship game, Biletnikoff had two receptions for 19 yards in the Raiders' 40–7 blow-out win over the Houston Oilers. In Super Bowl II against the Green Bay Packers, he caught two passes for 10 yards as the Raiders were defeated 33–14.

Biletnikoff recorded his only 1,000-yard receiving season in 1968, when he caught 61 passes for 1,037 yards and six touchdowns. The following season, in 1969 he caught a career-high 12 receiving touchdowns. He was an AFL All-Star for the second time and earned first-team All-AFL honors from the Associated Press, the Newspaper Enterprise Association, Pro Football Writers of America, The Sporting News, Pro Football Weekly, and the New York Daily News. The AFL merged into the National Football League in 1970. In his first five seasons in the NFL, Biletnikoff was invited to four Pro Bowls.

A highly productive receiver in the postseason, Biletnikoff left the NFL as the all-time leader in postseason receptions (70), receiving yards (1,167), and receiving touchdowns (10) accumulated over 19 postseason games. He recorded over 100 receiving yards in a postseason five times. In the 1968 American Football League playoffs, he had 14 receptions for 370 yards and four touchdowns through two games. In the 1976–77 NFL playoffs, Biletnikoff recorded 13 receptions for 216 yards and a touchdown. This included four catches for 79 yards to set up three Oakland scores in the Raiders' 32–14 victory in Super Bowl XI, for which he was named Super Bowl MVP.

Biletnikoff was released by the Raiders prior to the 1979 season. After a year off, he played one season in the Canadian Football League for the Montreal Alouettes in 1980. In his lone CFL season, Biletnikoff caught 38 passes, second-most on the team, for 470 yards and four touchdowns.

== NFL career statistics ==
Legend
	Super Bowl MVP
	Won the Super Bowl
	Led the league
**Bold**	Career high

=== Regular season ===
Year	Team	Games		Receiving					Fum
Year	Team	GP	GS	Rec	Yds	Y/R	Lng	TD	Fum
1965	OAK	14	8	24	331	13.8	53	0	0
1966	OAK	10	7	17	272	16.0	78	3	**2**
1967	OAK	14	9	40	876	**21.9**	72	5	1
1968	OAK	14	**14**	**61**	**1,037**	17.0	**82**	6	0
1969	OAK	14	**14**	54	837	15.5	53	**12**	1
1970	OAK	14	**14**	45	768	17.1	51	7	0
1971	OAK	14	**14**	**61**	929	15.2	49	9	1
1972	OAK	14	**14**	58	802	13.8	39	7	0
1973	OAK	14	**14**	48	660	13.8	32	4	0
1974	OAK	14	**14**	42	593	14.1	46	7	0
1975	OAK	11	10	43	587	13.7	26	2	0
1976	OAK	13	13	43	551	12.8	32	7	0
1977	OAK	14	**14**	33	446	13.5	44	5	1
1978	OAK	**16**	2	20	285	14.3	49	2	0
Career		190	161	589	8,974	15.2	82	76	6

=== Postseason ===
Year	Team	Games		Receiving				
Year	Team	GP	GS	Rec	Yds	Y/R	Lng	TD
1967	OAK	2	2	4	29	7.3	10	0
1968	OAK	2	2	**14**	**370**	**26.4**	**57**	**4**
1969	OAK	2	2	3	70	23.3	31	2
1970	OAK	2	2	8	138	17.3	38	2
1972	OAK	1	1	3	28	9.3	12	0
1973	OAK	2	2	3	23	7.7	8	0
1974	OAK	2	2	11	167	15.2	27	1
1975	OAK	1	0	0	0	—	0	0
1976	OAK	**3**	**3**	13	216	16.6	48	1
1977	OAK	2	2	11	126	11.5	18	0
Career		19	18	70	1,167	16.7	57	10

== Coaching career and later life ==
Biletnikoff began his career in coaching soon after his retirement from playing. He served on the coaching staff of Orange Glen High School (1982), Palomar College (1983), Diablo Valley College (1984), Oakland Invaders (1985), Arizona Wranglers (1986), and Calgary Stampeders (1987–88). In 1989, Biletnikoff became wide receivers coach for the Oakland Raiders, a position he held until 2007.

In February 1999, Biletnikoff's daughter Tracey was found strangled to death at age 20 in Redwood City, California. Tracey's boyfriend, Mohammed Haroon Ali, was convicted of first-degree murder in 2012 after admitting he strangled her with a T-shirt at a drug and alcohol treatment center during an argument over whether he had relapsed. He was sentenced to 55 years to life imprisonment. Biletnikoff called Ali an "animal" after the sentencing and said his hatred for him would never go away. In 2015, Biletnikoff founded Tracey's Place of Hope in Loomis, California, a shelter for domestic violence victims and substance abuse treatment for females ages 14 to 18.

== Honors ==
Biletnikoff was inducted into the Pro Football Hall of Fame in 1988. In 1999, Biletnikoff was ranked number 94 on The Sporting News' list of the "100 Greatest Football Players". He was voted into the College Football Hall of Fame in 1991. The Fred Biletnikoff Award, awarded annually by the Tallahassee Quarterback Club Foundation to the nation's outstanding receiver in NCAA Division I FBS since 1994, is named in his honor. In 2016, Biletnikoff was named the Walter Camp Man of the Year by the Walter Camp Football Foundation in recognition of his public service and his contributions to football. In 2025, he was inducted into the International Sports Hall of Fame.

== See also ==
- List of NCAA major college football yearly receiving leaders
