= Barry Pearson =

American football player (1950–2026)

No. 83, 85
- Position: Wide receiver

Personal information
- Born: February 4, 1950; Geneseo, Illinois, U.S.
- Died: August 16, 2026 (aged 76)
- Listed height: 5 ft 11 in (1.80 m)
- Listed weight: 185 lb (84 kg)

Career information
- High school: Geneseo
- College: Northwestern
- NFL draft: 1972: undrafted

Career history
- Pittsburgh Steelers (1972–1973); Kansas City Chiefs (1974–1976)

Awards and highlights
- 2× First-team All-Big Ten (1970, 1971)

Career NFL statistics
- Receptions: 86
- Receiving yards: 1,312
- Receiving touchdowns: 7
- Stats at Pro Football Reference

Barry Lynn Pearson (February 4, 1950 – August 16, 2026) was an American professional football player who was a wide receiver for four seasons with the Pittsburgh Steelers (1972–1973) and Kansas City Chiefs (1974–1976) of the National Football League (NFL). He played college football for the Northwestern Wildcats.

In 1972, making his pro football debut, Pearson was on the field for the Immaculate Reception and was the receiver for whom the play was designed, but Terry Bradshaw was flushed from the pocket and threw toward Frenchy Fuqua instead.

Pearson died on August 16, 2026, at the age of 76.
