= Mack Alston =

American football player (1947–2014)

No. 81, 82, 83
- Position: Tight end

Personal information
- Born: April 27, 1947; Georgetown, South Carolina, U.S.
- Died: December 24, 2014 (aged 67); Alexandria, Virginia, U.S.
- Listed height: 6 ft 2 in (1.88 m)
- Listed weight: 230 lb (104 kg)

Career information
- College: MD-Eastern Shore
- NFL draft: 1970: 11th round, 277th overall pick

Career history
- Washington Redskins (1970–1972); Houston Oilers (1973–1976); Baltimore Colts (1977–1980)

Career NFL statistics
- Receptions: 108
- Receiving yards: 1,247
- Receiving TDs: 15
- Stats at Pro Football Reference

Mack C. Alston Jr. (April 27, 1947 – December 24, 2014) was an American professional football player. A 6'2", 231 lb (105 kg) tight end from the University of Maryland Eastern Shore, Alston played 11 seasons from 1970 to 1980 in the National Football League (NFL). Alston was enlisted in the D.C. National Guard, where he served in the Military Police battalion. He died on December 24, 2014.
