= Ronnie Shanklin =

American football player (1948–2003)

No. 25
- Position: Wide receiver

Personal information
- Born: January 21, 1948; Hubbard, Texas, U.S.
- Died: April 17, 2003 (aged 55); DeSoto, Texas, U.S.
- Listed height: 6 ft 1 in (1.85 m)
- Listed weight: 183 lb (83 kg)

Career information
- High school: Carver (Amarillo, Texas)
- College: North Texas (1967-1969)
- NFL draft: 1970: 2nd round, 28th overall pick

Career history
- Pittsburgh Steelers (1970–1974); Chicago Bears (1975–1976)

Awards and highlights
- Super Bowl champion (IX); Pro Bowl (1973)

Career NFL statistics
- Receptions: 168
- Receiving yards: 3,079
- Receiving touchdowns: 24
- Stats at Pro Football Reference

Ronnie Shanklin (January 21, 1948 – April 17, 2003) was an American professional football player who was a wide receiver for six seasons in the National Football League (NFL) with the Pittsburgh Steelers and the Chicago Bears. He also played college football for the North Texas Mean Green.

He was a member of the 1974 Steelers squad that defeated the Minnesota Vikings in Super Bowl IX. He was also a part of the 1972 Steelers team that defeated the Oakland Raiders in the Immaculate Reception playoff game (their first post-season appearance since 1947) and the 1973 Steelers that lost to the Raiders in the first round of the playoffs.

He led all NFL receivers with a 23.7 yards per catch average in 1973.

== NFL career statistics ==
Legend
	Led the league
**Bold**	Career high

=== Regular season ===
Year	Team	Games		Receiving				
Year	Team	GP	GS	Rec	Yds	Avg	Lng	TD
1970	PIT	**14**	**14**	30	691	23.0	**81**	4
1971	PIT	**14**	**14**	**49**	652	13.3	42	6
1972	PIT	**14**	13	38	669	17.6	57	3
1973	PIT	13	13	30	**711**	**23.7**	67	**10**
1974	PIT	12	12	19	324	17.1	35	1
1976	CHI	5	5	2	32	16.0	35	0
Career		72	71	168	3,079	18.3	81	24

=== Playoffs ===
Year	Team	Games		Receiving				
Year	Team	GP	GS	Rec	Yds	Avg	Lng	TD
1972	PIT	2	2	**5**	**104**	**20.8**	**25**	0
1974	PIT	**3**	**3**	1	15	15.0	15	0
Career		5	5	6	119	19.8	25	0
