= John Fuqua =

American football player (born 1947)

No. 29, 33
- Position: Running back

Personal information
- Born: September 12, 1947 (age 79); Detroit, Michigan, U.S.
- Listed height: 5 ft 11 in (1.80 m)
- Listed weight: 205 lb (93 kg)

Career information
- High school: Eastern (Detroit)
- College: Morgan State
- NFL draft: 1969: 11th round, 273rd overall pick

Career history
- New York Giants (1969); Pittsburgh Steelers (1970–1974); New York Stars (1974)*; Pittsburgh Steelers (1975–1976)
- * Offseason or practice squad member only

Awards and highlights
- 2× Super Bowl champion (IX, X)

Career NFL statistics
- Rushing yards: 3,031
- Rushing average: 4.2
- Receptions: 135
- Receiving yards: 1,247
- Total touchdowns: 24
- Stats at Pro Football Reference

John William Fuqua (born September 12, 1947), nicknamed "Frenchy", is an American former professional football player who was a running back for the New York Giants and Pittsburgh Steelers of the National Football League (NFL) from 1969 to 1976. He also played for the New York Stars of the World Football League (WFL). He played college football for the Morgan State Bears.

== Biography ==
John Fuqua was born in Detroit, Michigan, on September 12, 1947. A 1965 graduate of Detroit's Eastern High School, he played college football at Morgan State University and was selected in the 11th round of the 1969 NFL/AFL draft by the New York Giants. The next season, Fuqua was traded to the Pittsburgh Steelers. It was while with the Steelers that Fuqua would become part of NFL history as the intended target for Terry Bradshaw's pass that resulted in the Immaculate Reception. Oakland Raiders safety Jack Tatum hit Fuqua just as the ball arrived. It has never been established whether the ball hit Fuqua or Tatum. This was critical, since under the rules of the time, once a pass touched an offensive player he was the only one eligible to catch the pass. If the ball had hit Fuqua without touching Tatum, the rules called for the play to be blown dead once Franco Harris touched the ball. Fuqua reportedly insists to this day that he knows whom the ball hit first, but will never tell.

Fuqua nicknamed himself "The French Count". He is remembered for being one of the flashiest dressers in the NFL, and would occasionally appear in public wearing platform shoes having see-through heels that contained water and a live tropical fish selected from his aquarium to match the color of the day's outfit. He won two Super Bowl titles during his Steelers tenure, which were also the first two championships in the team's history.

Over the course of his career, Fuqua played in 100 games, rushing for 3,031 yards and scoring 24 touchdowns. His best season was in 1970, his first with the Steelers, when he rushed for 691 yards and seven touchdowns. In this season, he set a then Steelers single-game rushing record of 218 yards against the Philadelphia Eagles. This was later surpassed in 2006 by Willie Parker when he gained 223 yards against the Cleveland Browns.

Teammate Franco Harris had his fanclub "Franco's Italian Army", and Fuqua had "Frenchy's Foreign Legion".

In celebration of the 35th anniversary of the Immaculate Reception, Fuqua created a candy bar called "The Immaculate Confection".

== NFL career statistics ==
Legend
	Won the Super Bowl
	Led the league
**Bold**	Career high

=== Regular season ===
Year	Team	Games		Rushing					Receiving				
Year	Team	GP	GS	Att	Yds	Avg	Lng	TD	Rec	Yds	Avg	Lng	TD
1969	NYG	13	1	20	89	4.5	35	0	3	11	3.7	6	0
1970	PIT	14	14	138	**691**	**5.0**	**85**	**7**	23	289	**12.6**	**57**	**2**
1971	PIT	12	12	**155**	625	4.0	30	4	**49**	**427**	8.7	40	1
1972	PIT	13	13	150	665	4.4	47	4	18	152	8.4	28	0
1973	PIT	11	7	117	457	3.9	25	2	17	150	8.8	22	0
1974	PIT	9	2	50	156	3.1	14	2	6	68	11.3	18	0
1975	PIT	14	3	74	285	3.9	18	1	18	146	8.1	21	0
1976	PIT	14	0	15	63	4.2	12	1	1	4	4.0	4	0
		100	52	719	3,031	4.2	85	21	135	1,247	9.2	57	3

=== Playoffs ===
Year	Team	Games		Rushing					Receiving				
Year	Team	GP	GS	Att	Yds	Avg	Lng	TD	Rec	Yds	Avg	Lng	TD
1972	PIT	2	2	**24**	72	3.0	**24**	0	1	11	11.0	11	0
1973	PIT	1	0	3	13	**4.3**	10	0	**4**	**52**	**13.0**	25	0
1975	PIT	3	0	0	0	0.0	0	0	0	0	0.0	0	0
1976	PIT	2	0	19	**78**	4.1	13	0	**4**	45	11.3	**31**	0
		8	2	46	163	3.5	24	0	9	108	12.0	31	0

== In popular culture ==
In Episode 31 of the fantasy comedy television series The Good Place, demon Michael, while visiting Earth, tells people that his assistant Janet is named Lisa "Frenchy" Fuqua.
