= Skip Butler =

American football player (born 1947)

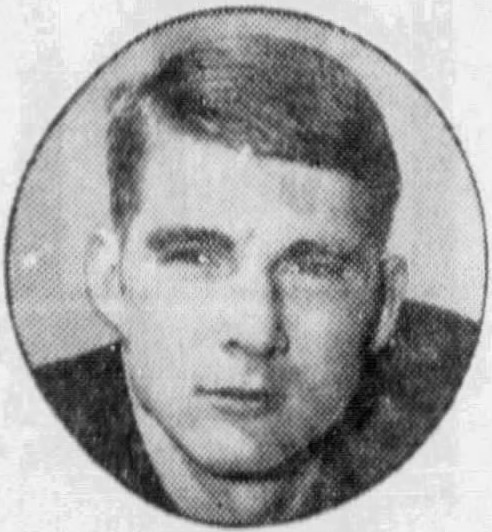
- Butler in 1970

No. 83, 3, 2
- Position: Placekicker

Personal information
- Born: October 21, 1947 (age 79); Gladewater, Texas, U.S.
- Listed height: 6 ft 1 in (1.85 m)
- Listed weight: 201 lb (91 kg)

Career information
- High school: Gladewater
- College: UT Arlington
- NFL draft: 1970: 4th round, 96th overall pick

Career history
- New Orleans Saints (1971); New York Giants (1971); Houston Oilers (1972–1977)

Career NFL statistics
- Field goals: 127 / 71
- Field goal %: 55.9
- Extra points: 133 / 127
- Stats at Pro Football Reference

William Foster "Skip" Butler (born October 21, 1947) is an American former professional football player who was a placekicker in the National Football League (NFL). He played college football for the UT Arlington Rebels and was selected by the Green Bay Packers in the fourth round, with the 96th overall pick of the 1970 NFL draft. He played seven seasons for the New Orleans Saints, New York Giants, and Houston Oilers.
