= 1974 WFL pro draft =

Meeting to select new players

General information
- Dates: March 18 and March 19, 1974
- Location: New York

Overview
- 480 total selections in 40 rounds
- League: WFL
- First selection: Charlie Evans, RB; New York Giants

The 1974 WFL pro draft was the first professional draft of the World Football League (WFL). It supplemented its collegiate draft and included players from the NFL and CFL. It consisted of 480 selections in 40 rounds. Although it was expected that most of the NFL players drafted would have no intention of signing with the new league, the WFL still wanted to have the prominent NFL players future rights assigned, preventing WFL teams from competing in the signing for the same players.

== Player selections ==
= All-Star
= WFL MVP

Round	Pick #	WFL Team	Player	Position	Team
1	1	Washington Ambassadors	Charlie Evans	RB	NY Giants
1	2	Toronto Northmen	Larry Csonka	RB	Miami Dolphins
1	3	Philadelphia Bell	Tim Rossovich	LB	San Diego Chargers
1	4	Portland Storm	Jim Plunkett	QB	New England Patriots
1	5	Jacksonville Sharks	Virgil Robinson	RB	New Orleans Saints
1	6	Detroit Wheels	Mike Taylor	LB	NY Jets
1	7	Birmingham Americans	Johnny Musso	RB	BC Lions
1	8	Southern California Sun	Tom Mack	OG	Los Angeles Rams
1	9	Chicago Fire	John Brockington	RB	Green Bay Packers
1	10	Houston Texans	Pete Beathard	QB	Kansas City Chiefs
1	11	The Hawaiians	Ted Kwalick	TE	San Francisco 49ers
1	12	New York Stars	Joe Namath	QB	NY Jets
2	13	New York Stars	Terry Hanratty	QB	Pittsburgh Steelers
2	14	The Hawaiians	Calvin Hill	RB	Dallas Cowboys
2	15	Houston Texans	Pete Lammons	TE	NY Jets
2	16	Chicago Fire	Don Morrison	OT	New Orleans Saints
2	17	Southern California Sun	Greg Barton	QB	Toronto Argonauts
2	18	Birmingham Americans	Craig Morton	QB	Dallas Cowboys
2	19	Detroit Wheels	Joe O'Donnell	OG	Buffalo Bills
2	20	Jacksonville Sharks	Bubba Smith	DE	Oakland Raiders
2	21	Portland Storm	Alan Page	DT	Minnesota Vikings
2	22	Philadelphia Bell	Dan Yochum	OT	Montreal Alouettes
2	23	Toronto Northmen	Paul Warfield	WR	Miami Dolphins
2	24	Washington Ambassadors	Bill Brundige	DT	Washington Redskins
3	25	Southern California Sun	Ted Hendricks	LB	Baltimore Colts
3	26	Washington Ambassadors	Terry Hermeling	OT	Washington Redskins
3	27	Toronto Northmen	Jim Kiick	RB	Miami Dolphins
3	28	Philadelphia Bell	Bob Tucker	TE	NY Giants
3	29	Portland Storm	Rick Eber	WR	Saskatchewan Roughriders
3	30	Jacksonville Sharks	Dave Leffers	OT	Oakland Raiders
3	31	Detroit Wheels	Paul Costa	OL	Buffalo Bills
3	32	Birmingham Americans	Paul Robinson	RB	Houston Oilers
3	33	Chicago Fire	Bill Baker	DE	Saskatchewan Roughriders
3	34	Houston Texans	Rick Arrington	QB	Philadelphia Eagles
3	35	The Hawaiians	Rockne Freitas	OT	Detroit Lions
3	36	New York Stars	Dave Williams	WR	Pittsburgh Steelers
4	37	New York Stars	Mike LaHood	OG	Los Angeles Rams
4	38	The Hawaiians	Ron East	DT	San Diego Chargers
4	39	Houston Texans	Joe Reed	QB	San Francisco 49ers
4	40	Chicago Fire	Mike McCoy	DT	Green Bay Packers
4	41	Southern California Sun	Bryant Salter	DB	San Diego Chargers
4	42	Birmingham Americans	Jim Mandich	TE	Miami Dolphins
4	43	Detroit Wheels	Jon Henderson	WR	Calgary Stampeders
4	44	Jacksonville Sharks	Dave Roller	DT	Toronto Argonauts
4	45	Portland Storm	George Wells	DE	Toronto Argonauts
4	46	Philadelphia Bell	Al Atkinson	LB	NY Jets
4	47	Toronto Northmen	Pete Richardson	DB	Buffalo Bills
4	48	Washington Ambassadors	Bob Brunet	RB	Washington Redskins
5	49	Washington Ambassadors	Mike Taliaferro	QB	New England Patriots
5	50	Toronto Northmen	Bruce Bergey	DE	Toronto Argonauts
5	51	Philadelphia Bell	Don Strock	QB	Miami Dolphins
5	52	Portland Storm	Ron Curl	DT	Toronto Argonauts
5	53	Jacksonville Sharks	Ray Nettles	LB	BC Lions
5	54	Detroit Wheels	Dale Livingston	K	Detroit Lions
5	55	Birmingham Americans	Ron Jessie	WR	Detroit Lions
5	56	Southern California Sun	Bill Munson	QB	Detroit Lions
5	57	Chicago Fire	Ron Porter	LB	Minnesota Vikings
5	58	Houston Texans	Daryle Lamonica	QB	Oakland Raiders
5	59	The Hawaiians	Bob Grim	WR	NY Giants
5	60	New York Stars	Marty Huff	LB	Edmonton Eskimos
6	61	Birmingham Americans	Levert Carr	OT	Houston Oilers
6	61	New York Stars	Kent Peterson	TE	Cincinnati Bengals
6	62	The Hawaiians	Randy Johnson	QB	NY Giants
6	63	Houston Texans	Rick Cassata	QB	Ottawa Rough Riders
6	64	Chicago Fire	Don Talbert	OT	Dallas Cowboys
6	65	Southern California Sun	Willie Buchanon	DB	Green Bay Packers
6	67	Detroit Wheels	Cliff Burnett	DT	Edmonton Eskimos
6	68	Jacksonville Sharks	Ed George	OL	Montreal Alouettes
6	69	Portland Storm	Ken Matthews	WR	Toronto Argonauts
6	70	Philadelphia Bell	John Babinecz	LB	Dallas Cowboys
6	71	Toronto Northmen	Fest Cotton	DT	Cleveland Browns
6	72	Washington Ambassadors	Charlie Weaver	LB	Detroit Lions
7	73	Washington Ambassadors	Edd Hargett	QB	Houston Oilers
7	74	Toronto Northmen	Gerry Organ	K	Ottawa Rough Riders
7	75	Philadelphia Bell	Stan Walters	OT	Cincinnati Bengals
7	76	Portland Storm	Rufus Ferguson	RB	Free agent
7	77	Jacksonville Sharks	Dave Braggins	OG	Free agent
7	78	Detroit Wheels	Hubie Bryant	WR	Green Bay Packers
7	79	Birmingham Americans	Claude Humphrey	DE	Atlanta Falcons
7	80	Southern California Sun	Wally Chambers	DT	Chicago Bears
7	81	Chicago Fire	John Tanner	LB	New England Patriots
7	82	Houston Texans	Bob Creech	LB	Philadelphia Eagles
7	83	The Hawaiians	Jim Sniadecki	LB	San Francisco 49ers
7	84	New York Stars	Andy Selfridge	LB	Buffalo Bills
8	85	New York Stars	Paul Gipson	RB	New England Patriots
8	86	The Hawaiians	Bobby Scott	QB	New Orleans Saints
8	87	Houston Texans	Tommy Maxwell	DB	Oakland Raiders
8	88	Chicago Fire	Benny Johnson	DB	Houston Oilers
8	89	Southern California Sun	Rick Cody	C	Chicago Bears
8	90	Birmingham Americans	Jim Mitchell	TE	Atlanta Falcons
8	91	Detroit Wheels	Lee Fobbs	RB	Ottawa Rough Riders
8	92	Jacksonville Sharks	Steve Davis	RB	Pittsburgh Steelers
8	93	Portland Storm	Larry Breen	LB	Hamilton Tiger-Cats
8	94	Philadelphia Bell	Mike Evans	C	Detroit Lions
8	95	Toronto Northmen	Charlie Brandon	DT	Ottawa Rough Riders
8	96	Washington Ambassadors	Perry Williams	RB	Green Bay Packers
9	97	Washington Ambassadors	Brian Stenger	LB	New England Patriots
9	98	Toronto Northmen	Bob Asher	OT	Chicago Bears
9	99	Philadelphia Bell	Tom Laputka	DL	Ottawa Rough Riders
9	100	Portland Storm	Jim Nance	RB	NY Jets
9	101	Jacksonville Sharks	Bill Lefear	RB	Cleveland Browns
9	102	Detroit Wheels	Carl Taibi	DE	Washington Redskins
9	103	Birmingham Americans	Larry Willingham	DB	St. Louis Cardinals
9	104	Southern California Sun	Earl McCullouch	WR	Detroit Lions
9	105	Chicago Fire	Mickey Doyle	LB	Winnipeg Blue Bombers
9	106	Houston Texans	John Eason	WR	Montreal Alouettes
9	107	The Hawaiians	George Nock	RB	Baltimore Colts
9	108	New York Stars	Bert Askson	TE	Houston Oilers
10	109	New York Stars	Sam Walton	OT	NY Jets
10	110	The Hawaiians	Vin Clements	RB	NY Giants
10	111	Houston Texans	Steve Ramsey	QB	Denver Broncos
10	112	Chicago Fire	Len Gotschalk	OT	Atlanta Falcons
10	113	Southern California Sun	Joe Greene	DT	Pittsburgh Steelers
10	114	Birmingham Americans	Ken Stabler	QB	Oakland Raiders
10	115	Detroit Wheels	Steve Owens	RB	Detroit Lions
10	116	Jacksonville Sharks	Paul Seiler	OT	Oakland Raiders
10	117	Portland Storm	Pete Wysocki	LB	Saskatchewan Roughriders
10	118	Philadelphia Bell	Ron Holliday	WR	San Diego Chargers
10	119	Toronto Northmen	Ron Mikolajczyk	OL	Toronto Argonauts
10	120	Washington Ambassadors	Robert James	DB	Buffalo Bills
11	121	Washington Ambassadors	John Zook	DE	Atlanta Falcons
11	122	Toronto Northmen	Paul Laavig	OG	Washington Redskins
11	123	Philadelphia Bell	Steve Chomyszak	DT	Cincinnati Bengals
11	124	Portland Storm	Ted Gerela	K	BC Lions
11	125	Jacksonville Sharks	Jack Tatum	DB	Oakland Raiders
11	126	Detroit Wheels	Ed Flanagan	C	Detroit Lions
11	127	Birmingham Americans	William Martin	OL	Edmonton Eskimos
11	128	Southern California Sun	Marv Montgomery	OT	Denver Broncos
11	129	Chicago Fire	Cyril Pinder	RB	Pittsburgh Steelers
11	130	Houston Texans	Mike Livingston	QB	Kansas City Chiefs
11	131	The Hawaiians	Pat Toomay	DE	Dallas Cowboys
11	132	New York Stars	Mike Reid	DT	Cincinnati Bengals
12	133	New York Stars	Randy Rasmussen	OG	NY Jets
12	134	The Hawaiians	Jim Hill	DB	Green Bay Packers
12	135	Houston Texans	Walt Garrison	RB	Dallas Cowboys
12	136	Chicago Fire	Tim Anderson	DB	Toronto Argonauts
12	137	Southern California Sun	Carl Eller	DE	Minnesota Vikings
12	138	Birmingham Americans	Ken Reaves	DB	Atlanta Falcons
12	139	Detroit Wheels	Eldridge Dickey	WR	Oakland Raiders
12	140	Jacksonville Sharks	Bruce Taylor	DB	San Francisco 49ers
12	141	Portland Storm	Manny Fernandez	DT	Miami Dolphins
12	142	Philadelphia Bell	Roger Wehrli	DB	St. Louis Cardinals
12	143	Toronto Northmen	Ernie Janet	OL	Chicago Bears
12	144	Washington Ambassadors	Chuck Dicus	WR	Pittsburgh Steelers
13	145	Washington Ambassadors	Rodrigo Barnes	LB	Dallas Cowboys
13	146	Toronto Northmen	Jerry Campbell	LB	Ottawa Rough Riders
13	147	Philadelphia Bell	John Mendenhall	DT	NY Giants
13	148	Portland Storm	Pete Athas	DB	NY Giants
13	149	Jacksonville Sharks	Randy Jackson	OG	Chicago Bears
13	150	Detroit Wheels	George Goeddeke	C	Denver Broncos
13	151	Birmingham Americans	Bill Butler	RB	New Orleans Saints
13	152	Southern California Sun	Mark Lomas	DE	NY Jets
13	153	Chicago Fire	Ralph Galloway	OG	Saskatchewan Roughriders
13	154	Houston Texans	Ron Hornsby	LB	NY Giants
13	155	The Hawaiians	George Farmer	WR	Chicago Bears
13	156	New York Stars	Travis Roach	OG	BC Lions
14	157	New York Stars	Carter Campbell	LB	NY Giants
14	158	The Hawaiians	John Huard	LB	Toronto Argonauts
14	159	Houston Texans	Bill Stanfill	DE	Miami Dolphins
14	160	Chicago Fire	Dave Butz	DT	St. Louis Cardinals
14	161	Southern California Sun	Wayne Clark	QB	Cincinnati Bengals
14	162	Birmingham Americans	Curtis Webster	OL	BC Lions
14	163	Detroit Wheels	Frank Nunley	LB	San Francisco 49ers
14	164	Jacksonville Sharks	Wayne Benson	LB	Atlanta Falcons
14	165	Portland Storm	George Kunz	OT	Atlanta Falcons
14	166	Philadelphia Bell	Doug Wilkerson	OG	San Diego Chargers
14	167	Toronto Northmen	Mike Wagner	DB	Pittsburgh Steelers
14	168	Washington Ambassadors	Joe Taffoni	OT	NY Giants
15	169	Washington Ambassadors	Terry Owens	OT	San Diego Chargers
15	170	Toronto Northmen	Jim Duke	DE	Winnipeg Blue Bombers
15	171	Philadelphia Bell	John Rowser	DB	Pittsburgh Steelers
15	172	Portland Storm	Jim Ward	QB	Philadelphia Eagles
15	173	Jacksonville Sharks	Greg Sampson	DE	Houston Oilers
15	174	Detroit Wheels	Earl Thomas	TE	Chicago Bears
15	175	Birmingham Americans	Frank Pitts	WR	Cleveland Browns
15	176	Southern California Sun	John Didion	C	New Orleans Saints
15	177	Chicago Fire	Eric Allen	DB	Toronto Argonauts
15	178	Houston Texans	Fletcher Smith	WR	Free agent
15	179	The Hawaiians	Ira Gordon	OT	San Diego Chargers
15	180	New York Stars	Gerry Philbin	DE	Philadelphia Eagles
16	181	New York Stars	John Fuqua	RB	Pittsburgh Steelers
16	182	The Hawaiians	Larry Schreiber	RB	San Francisco 49ers
16	183	Houston Texans	Sam Holden	OT	New Orleans Saints
16	184	Chicago Fire	Mike Montgomery	RB	Dallas Cowboys
16	185	Southern California Sun	Isaac Curtis	WR	Cincinnati Bengals
16	186	Birmingham Americans	Joe Profit	RB	New Orleans Saints
16	187	Detroit Wheels	Bud Magrum	DE	BC Lions
16	188	Jacksonville Sharks	Doug Buffone	LB	Chicago Bears
16	189	Portland Storm	Jim Evenson	RB	Ottawa Rough Riders
16	190	Philadelphia Bell	Charlie West	DB	Minnesota Vikings
16	191	Toronto Northmen	Andy Hopkins	RB	Hamilton Tiger-Cats
16	192	Washington Ambassadors	Ted Vactor	DB	Washington Redskins
17	193	Washington Ambassadors	Herb Mul-Key	RB	Washington Redskins
17	194	Toronto Northmen	Wayne Smith	DE	Ottawa Rough Riders
17	195	Philadelphia Bell	Rudy Sims	DE	Ottawa Rough Riders
17	196	Portland Storm	Del Williams	OG	New Orleans Saints
17	197	Jacksonville Sharks	Hubert Ginn	RB	Baltimore Colts
17	198	Detroit Wheels	John Tarver	RB	New England Patriots
17	199	Birmingham Americans	Tim Foley	DB	Miami Dolphins
17	200	Southern California Sun	Ron Yary	OT	Minnesota Vikings
17	201	Chicago Fire	Willie Holmes	DE	Washington Redskins
17	202	Houston Texans	Jim Harrison	RB	Chicago Bears
17	203	The Hawaiians	Ed Baker	QB	Houston Oilers
17	204	New York Stars	Cliff McClain	RB	NY Jets
18	205	New York Stars	Mack Herron	RB	Winnipeg Blue Bombers
18	206	The Hawaiians	Larry Walton	WR	Detroit Lions
18	207	Houston Texans	Royce Smith	OG	New Orleans Saints
18	208	Chicago Fire	Randy Beisler	OG	San Francisco 49ers
18	209	Southern California Sun	Tom Hayes	DB	Atlanta Falcons
18	210	Birmingham Americans	John Demarie	OG	Cleveland Browns
18	211	Detroit Wheels	Mike Walker	LB	BC Lions
18	212	Jacksonville Sharks	Glen Holloway	OG	Chicago Bears
18	213	Portland Storm	Tom Blanchard	QB	NY Giants
18	214	Philadelphia Bell	Reggie Berry	DB	San Diego Chargers
18	215	Toronto Northmen	Rhome Nixon	WR	Ottawa Rough Riders
18	216	Washington Ambassadors	Dave Elmendorf	DB	Los Angeles Rams
19	217	Washington Ambassadors	Wayne Mulligan	C	St. Louis Cardinals
19	218	Toronto Northmen	Gene Mack	LB	Toronto Argonauts
19	219	Philadelphia Bell	Walker Gillette	WR	St. Louis Cardinals
19	220	Portland Storm	Jerry Smith	TE	Washington Redskins
19	221	Jacksonville Sharks	Bob Hayes	WR	Dallas Cowboys
19	222	Detroit Wheels	Bruce Smith	DT	Hamilton Tiger-Cats
19	223	Birmingham Americans	Woody Peoples	OT	San Francisco 49ers
19	224	Southern California Sun	Paul Smith	DT	NY Jets
19	225	Chicago Fire	Nick Roman	DE	Cleveland Browns
19	226	Houston Texans	Bob McKay	OT	Cleveland Browns
19	227	The Hawaiians	Tom Stincic	LB	Houston Oilers
19	228	New York Stars	Halvor Hagen	OL	Buffalo Bills
20	229	New York Stars	Chip Myrtle	LB	Denver Broncos
20	230	The Hawaiians	Skip Thomas	DB	Oakland Raiders
20	231	Houston Texans	Eldridge Small	DB	NY Giants
20	232	Chicago Fire	Steve Wright	OT	Philadelphia Eagles
20	233	Southern California Sun	Pat Curran	TE	Los Angeles Rams
20	234	Birmingham Americans	Larry Woods	DL	Detroit Lions
20	234	Toronto Northmen	Bill Lankaitis	OL	New England Patriots
20	235	Detroit Wheels	Rocky Bleier	RB	Pittsburgh Steelers
20	236	Jacksonville Sharks	Dan Fouts	QB	San Diego Chargers
20	237	Portland Storm	John Jacqua	DB	Washington Redskins
20	238	Philadelphia Bell	Glen Edwards	DB	Pittsburgh Steelers
20	240	Washington Ambassadors	Doug Davis	OT	Minnesota Vikings
21	241	Washington Ambassadors	George Starke	OL	Washington Redskins
21	242	Toronto Northmen	Tony McGee	DE	Chicago Bears
21	243	Philadelphia Bell	Art Green	RB	Ottawa Rough Riders
21	244	Portland Storm	Tom Neville	OT	New England Patriots
21	245	Jacksonville Sharks	Clarence Davis	RB	Oakland Raiders
21	246	Detroit Wheels	George Saimes	DB	Denver Broncos
21	247	Birmingham Americans	George McGowan	DB	Edmonton Eskimos
21	248	Southern California Sun	Jeff Siemon	LB	Minnesota Vikings
21	249	Chicago Fire	Doug Dieken	OT	Cleveland Browns
21	250	Houston Texans	Don Nottingham	RB	Miami Dolphins
21	251	The Hawaiians	Cas Banaszek	OT	San Francisco 49ers
21	252	New York Stars	Jerry Sherk	DT	Cleveland Browns
22	253	New York Stars	Randy Vataha	WR	New England Patriots
22	254	The Hawaiians	Jack Youngblood	DE	Los Angeles Rams
22	255	Houston Texans	Ron Saul	OG	Houston Oilers
22	256	Chicago Fire	Charlie Potts	DB	Detroit Lions
22	257	Southern California Sun	Bob Berry	QB	Minnesota Vikings
22	258	Birmingham Americans	Dickie Harris	DB	Montreal Alouettes
22	259	Detroit Wheels	Jerome Gantt	OT	Hamilton Tiger-Cats
22	260	Jacksonville Sharks	Pete Lazetich	LB	Cleveland Browns
22	261	Portland Storm	Steve Preece	DB	Los Angeles Rams
22	263	Toronto Northmen	Phil Villapiano	LB	Oakland Raiders
22	263	Philadelphia Bell	Mark Kosmos	DB	Hamilton Tiger-Cats
22	264	Washington Ambassadors	Mo Moorman	OG	Kansas City Chiefs
23	265	Washington Ambassadors	Hank Bjorklund	RB	NY Jets
23	266	Toronto Northmen	Jim Young	WR	BC Lions
23	267	Philadelphia Bell	Calvin Hunt	C	Houston Oilers
23	268	Portland Storm	Mike Lucci	LB	Detroit Lions
23	269	Jacksonville Sharks	Larry Ball	LB	Miami Dolphins
23	270	Detroit Wheels	Tuufuli Uperesa	OG	Winnipeg Blue Bombers
23	271	Birmingham Americans	John Matlock	C	Chicago Bears
23	272	Southern California Sun	Cedric Hardman	DE	San Francisco 49ers
23	273	Chicago Fire	Willie Frazier	TE	Kansas City Chiefs
23	274	Houston Texans	Dave Tipton	DE	NY Giants
23	275	The Hawaiians	Junior Ah You	DE	Montreal Alouettes
23	276	New York Stars	John Schmidt	C	NY Jets
24	277	New York Stars	Fred Willis	RB	Houston Oilers
24	278	The Hawaiians	Roman Gabriel	QB	Philadelphia Eagles
24	279	Houston Texans	Steve Spurrier	QB	San Francisco 49ers
24	280	Chicago Fire	Chuck Ealey	QB	Hamilton Tiger-Cats
24	281	Southern California Sun	Terry Metcalf	RB	St. Louis Cardinals
24	282	Birmingham Americans	Ralph Coleman	LB	Dallas Cowboys
24	283	Detroit Wheels	Elmo Wright	WR	Kansas City Chiefs
24	284	Jacksonville Sharks	Doug Adams	LB	Cincinnati Bengals
24	285	Portland Storm	Tom Oberg	DB	Winnipeg Blue Bombers
24	286	Philadelphia Bell	Wade Key	OT	Philadelphia Eagles
24	287	Toronto Northmen	Eddie Ray	RB	Atlanta Falcons
24	288	Washington Ambassadors	MacArthur Lane	RB	Green Bay Packers
25	289	Washington Ambassadors	Bill Bergey	LB	Cincinnati Bengals
25	290	Toronto Northmen	Curt Knight	K	Washington Redskins
25	291	Philadelphia Bell	John Mooring	OL	NY Jets
25	292	Portland Storm	Paul Brothers	QB	Ottawa Rough Riders
25	293	Jacksonville Sharks	Carl Garrett	RB	Chicago Bears
25	294	Detroit Wheels	Mickey Zofko	RB	Detroit Lions
25	295	Birmingham Americans	Wayne Matherne	DB	Ottawa Rough Riders
25	296	Southern California Sun	Mike Curtis	LB	Baltimore Colts
25	297	Chicago Fire	Jim Elder	DB	Saskatchewan Roughriders
25	298	Houston Texans	Rex Kern	DB	Baltimore Colts
25	299	The Hawaiians	Mark Arneson	LB	St. Louis Cardinals
25	300	New York Stars	John Dockery	DB	Pittsburgh Steelers
26	301	New York Stars	Jim Mitchell	DE	Detroit Lions
26	302	The Hawaiians	Alden Roche	DE	Green Bay Packers
26	303	Houston Texans	Cliff Harris	DB	Dallas Cowboys
26	304	Chicago Fire	Bernard Jackson	DB	Cincinnati Bengals
26	305	Southern California Sun	Elvin Bethea	DE	Houston Oilers
26	306	Birmingham Americans	Chuck Zapiez	LB	Montreal Alouettes
26	307	Detroit Wheels	Bill Laskey	LB	Denver Broncos
26	308	Jacksonville Sharks	Roger Lawson	RB	Chicago Bears
26	309	Portland Storm	John Helton	DT	Saskatchewan Roughriders
26	310	Philadelphia Bell	Ray White	LB	San Diego Chargers
26	311	Toronto Northmen	Cal Withrow	C	Green Bay Packers
26	312	Washington Ambassadors	Larry Hand	DE	Detroit Lions
27	313	Washington Ambassadors	Stan Cherry	LB	Baltimore Colts
27	314	Toronto Northmen	Vic Washington	RB	San Francisco 49ers
27	315	Philadelphia Bell	Roy Kirskey	OL	Philadelphia Eagles
27	316	Portland Storm	Bob Stein	LB	Los Angeles Rams
27	317	Jacksonville Sharks	Chip Glass	TE	Cleveland Browns
27	318	Detroit Wheels	Mike Weger	DB	Detroit Lions
27	319	Birmingham Americans	Walter Francis	WR	Buffalo Bills
27	320	Southern California Sun	Bob Pollard	DT	New Orleans Saints
27	321	Chicago Fire	Craig Koinzan	DE	Calgary Stampeders
27	322	Houston Texans	Dave Edwards	LB	Dallas Cowboys
27	323	The Hawaiians	Jim McFarland	TE	St. Louis Cardinals
27	324	New York Stars	Ed Galigher	DE	NY Jets
28	325	New York Stars	Doug Van Horn	OG	NY Giants
28	326	The Hawaiians	Harmon Wages	RB	Atlanta Falcons
28	327	Houston Texans	Ralph Cindrich	LB	Houston Oilers
28	328	Chicago Fire	Sonny Jurgensen	QB	Washington Redskins
28	329	Southern California Sun	Al Woodall	QB	NY Jets
28	330	Birmingham Americans	Oliver Ross	RB	Denver Broncos
28	331	Detroit Wheels	Gary Nowak	DE	Houston Oilers
28	332	Jacksonville Sharks	Guy Dennis	OG	Detroit Lions
28	333	Portland Storm	Otto Brown	DB	Dallas Cowboys
28	334	Philadelphia Bell	Gary Puetz	OL	NY Jets
28	335	Toronto Northmen	Boobie Clark	RB	Cincinnati Bengals
28	336	Washington Ambassadors	Lionel Antoine	DT	Chicago Bears
29	337	Washington Ambassadors	Craig Robinson	OT	New Orleans Saints
29	338	Toronto Northmen	Dick Jauron	DB	Detroit Lions
29	339	Philadelphia Bell	Marv Roberts	C	Los Angeles Rams
29	340	Portland Storm	Billy Truax	TE	Dallas Cowboys
29	341	Jacksonville Sharks	Tony Plummer	DB	Atlanta Falcons
29	342	Detroit Wheels	Jesse Mims	RB	Calgary Stampeders
29	343	Birmingham Americans	Louis Porter	DB	Hamilton Tiger-Cats
29	344	Southern California Sun	Otis Sistrunk	DT	Oakland Raiders
29	345	Chicago Fire	Tim Roth	DE	Saskatchewan Roughriders
29	346	Houston Texans	Pete Banaszak	RB	Oakland Raiders
29	347	The Hawaiians	Greg Wojcik	DE	San Diego Chargers
29	348	New York Stars	Jim Marsalis	DB	Kansas City Chiefs
30	349	New York Stars	Craig Hanneman	DE	Pittsburgh Steelers
30	350	The Hawaiians	Al Clark	DB	Los Angeles Rams
30	351	Houston Texans	Dean Carlson	QB	Kansas City Chiefs
30	352	Chicago Fire	Ken Mendenhall	C	Baltimore Colts
30	353	Southern California Sun	Dwight White	DE	Pittsburgh Steelers
30	354	Birmingham Americans	Tom Smith	RB	Miami Dolphins
30	355	Detroit Wheels	Bill Adams	OG	Buffalo Bills
30	356	Jacksonville Sharks	Bill Gregory	DE	Dallas Cowboys
30	357	Portland Storm	Mark Nordquist	C	Philadelphia Eagles
30	358	Philadelphia Bell	Dennis Partee	P	San Diego Chargers
30	359	Toronto Northmen	Joey Jackson	DT	Saskatchewan Roughriders
30	360	Washington Ambassadors	Joe Federspiel	LB	New Orleans Saints
31	361	Washington Ambassadors	Malcolm Snider	OG	Green Bay Packers
31	362	Toronto Northmen	Ron Johnson	RB	NY Giants
31	363	Philadelphia Bell	Jonnie Knoble	LB	Los Angeles Rams
31	364	Portland Storm	Gary Inskeep	DE	Hamilton Tiger-Cats
31	365	Jacksonville Sharks	Jim Gunn	LB	Chicago Bears
31	366	Detroit Wheels	Dick Enderle	OG	NY Giants
31	367	Birmingham Americans	Jim Yarbrough	OL	Cleveland Browns
31	368	Southern California Sun	Charlie Sanders	TE	Detroit Lions
31	369	Chicago Fire	Jesse Powell	LB	Miami Dolphins
31	370	Houston Texans	Tom Gatewood	TE	NY Giants
31	371	The Hawaiians	Larry Cole	DE	Dallas Cowboys
31	372	New York Stars	Chuck Bonica	OG	BC Lions
32	373	New York Stars	Ken Avery	LB	Cincinnati Bengals
32	374	The Hawaiians	Elmer Collett	OG	Baltimore Colts
32	375	Houston Texans	Larry Jacobson	DE	NY Giants
32	376	Chicago Fire	Guy Murdock	C	Houston Oilers
32	377	Southern California Sun	Sherman White	DE	Cincinnati Bengals
32	378	Birmingham Americans	Dave Cutler	K	Edmonton Eskimos
32	379	Detroit Wheels	George Webster	LB	Pittsburgh Steelers
32	380	Jacksonville Sharks	Ron Berger	DE	Miami Dolphins
32	381	Portland Storm	Jake Kupp	OG	New Orleans Saints
32	382	Philadelphia Bell	Bill Ellenbogen	OG	Houston Oilers
32	383	Toronto Northmen	Al Brenner	DB	Hamilton Tiger-Cats
32	384	Washington Ambassadors	Mike Hull	RB	Washington Redskins
33	385	Washington Ambassadors	Jerry Tagge	QB	Green Bay Packers
33	386	Toronto Northmen	Darryl Stingley	WR	NY Jets
33	387	Philadelphia Bell	Dave Reich	OL	New England Patriots
33	388	Portland Storm	Steve DeLong	DE	Chicago Bears
33	389	Jacksonville Sharks	Eddie Hinton	WR	Houston Oilers
33	390	Detroit Wheels	Wally Hilgenberg	LB	Minnesota Vikings
33	391	Birmingham Americans	John Hannah	OT	New England Patriots
33	392	Southern California Sun	Curley Culp	DT	Kansas City Chiefs
33	393	Chicago Fire	Tom DeLeone	C	Cincinnati Bengals
33	394	Houston Texans	Bob Young	OG	St. Louis Cardinals
33	395	The Hawaiians	John Vella	OL	Oakland Raiders
33	396	New York Stars	Gordon Gravelle	OL	Pittsburgh Steelers
34	397	New York Stars	Rick Cash	DT	New England Patriots
34	398	The Hawaiians	Greg Larsen	C	NY Giants
34	399	Houston Texans	Jon Kolb	OT	Pittsburgh Steelers
34	400	Chicago Fire	Mike Brown	LB	Calgary Stampeders
34	401	Southern California Sun	Jack Rudnay	C	Kansas City Chiefs
34	402	Birmingham Americans	Tom Banks	C	St. Louis Cardinals
34	403	Detroit Wheels	Art Malone	RB	Atlanta Falcons
34	404	Jacksonville Sharks	Charles Goodwin	OL	Minnesota Vikings
34	405	Portland Storm	Nate Ramsey	DB	Philadelphia Eagles
34	406	Philadelphia Bell	Harry Gooden	DE	Dallas Cowboys
34	407	Toronto Northmen	Dave Rowe	DT	New England Patriots
34	408	Washington Ambassadors	Mike Kaczmarek	LB	Baltimore Colts
35	409	Washington Ambassadors	Fred Hoaglin	C	Baltimore Colts
35	410	Toronto Northmen	Alan Aldrich	C	Cleveland Browns
35	411	Philadelphia Bell	Bob Thomson	DE	Dallas Cowboys
35	412	Portland Storm	Mike Taylor	OT	St. Louis Cardinals
35	413	Jacksonville Sharks	Carleton Oats	DT	Green Bay Packers
35	414	Detroit Wheels	Frank Gallagher	OG	Green Bay Packers
35	415	Birmingham Americans	Horace Jones	DE	Oakland Raiders
35	416	Southern California Sun	Sandy Durko	DB	New England Patriots
35	417	Chicago Fire	Ed Williams	RB	Cincinnati Bengals
35	418	Houston Texans	Doug Swift	LB	Detroit Lions
35	419	The Hawaiians	Jake Scott	DB	Miami Dolphins
35	420	New York Stars	Warren Bankston	RB	Oakland Raiders
36	421	New York Stars	Len St. Jean	OG	New England Patriots
36	422	The Hawaiians	Skip Vanderbundt	LB	San Francisco 49ers
36	423	Houston Texans	Mac Percival	K	Chicago Bears
36	424	Chicago Fire	Bobby Douglass	QB	Chicago Bears
36	425	Southern California Sun	Dwayne Crump	DB	St. Louis Cardinals
36	426	Birmingham Americans	Dan Pastorini	QB	Houston Oilers
36	427	Detroit Wheels	Dave Osborne	RB	Minnesota Vikings
36	428	Jacksonville Sharks	Dan Ryczek	C	Washington Redskins
36	429	Portland Storm	Ed Mooney	LB	Washington Redskins
36	430	Philadelphia Bell	Phil Price	DB	Montreal Alouettes
36	431	Toronto Northmen	Leon McQuay	RB	Calgary Stampeders
36	432	Washington Ambassadors	Ray Schoenke	OL	Washington Redskins
37	433	Washington Ambassadors	Roy Jefferson	WR	Washington Redskins
37	434	Toronto Northmen	Kent Kramer	TE	Philadelphia Eagles
37	435	Philadelphia Bell	Billy Joe Mantooth	LB	Philadelphia Eagles
37	436	Portland Storm	Rick Volk	DB	Baltimore Colts
37	437	Jacksonville Sharks	Mirro Roder	K	Chicago Bears
37	438	Detroit Wheels	Steve Smith	OT	Philadelphia Eagles
37	439	Birmingham Americans	Mike Kolen	LB	Miami Dolphins
37	440	Southern California Sun	Billy Parks	WR	Houston Oilers
37	441	Chicago Fire	Tom Roussel	LB	Philadelphia Eagles
37	442	Houston Texans	Howard Twilley	WR	Miami Dolphins
37	443	The Hawaiians	Tom Wittum	P	San Francisco 49ers
37	444	New York Stars	Brian Dowling	QB	New England Patriots
38	445	New York Stars	Bruce Lemmerman	QB	Edmonton Eskimos
38	446	The Hawaiians	Ron Lumpkin	DB	NY Giants
38	447	Houston Texans	Pat Holmes	DT	Kansas City Chiefs
38	448	Chicago Fire	Bob Anderson	RB	Denver Broncos
38	449	Southern California Sun	Ray May	LB	Denver Broncos
38	450	Birmingham Americans	Clarence Ellis	DB	Atlanta Falcons
38	451	Detroit Wheels	Josh Ashton	RB	New England Patriots
38	452	Jacksonville Sharks	Leon Crosswhite	RB	Detroit Lions
38	453	Portland Storm	Blaine Nye	OG	Dallas Cowboys
38	454	Philadelphia Bell	Ed Thomas	DT	NY Jets
38	455	Toronto Northmen	James Bailey	DT	Baltimore Colts
38	456	Washington Ambassadors	Diron Talbert	DT	Washington Redskins
39	457	Washington Ambassadors	Sam Wyche	QB	Washington Redskins
39	458	Toronto Northmen	Ken Houston	DB	Washington Redskins
39	459	Philadelphia Bell	James Jackson	DE	Houston Oilers
39	460	Portland Storm	Don Shy	RB	Chicago Bears
39	461	Jacksonville Sharks	George Buehler	OG	Oakland Raiders
39	462	Detroit Wheels	Greg Marx	DT	Atlanta Falcons
39	463	Birmingham Americans	Tommy Casanova	DB	Cincinnati Bengals
39	464	Southern California Sun	O. J. Simpson	RB	Buffalo Bills
39	465	Chicago Fire	Mike Sensibaugh	DB	Kansas City Chiefs
39	466	Houston Texans	Francis Peay	OT	Green Bay Packers
39	467	The Hawaiians	Ken Gaydos	WR	Oakland Raiders
39	468	New York Stars	Rick Galbos	LB	Calgary Stampeders
40	469	New York Stars	Ron Estay	DE	BC Lions
40	470	The Hawaiians	Dick Shiner	QB	New England Patriots
40	471	Houston Texans	Don Horn	QB	Cleveland Browns
40	472	Chicago Fire	Jan White	TE	Buffalo Bills
40	473	Southern California Sun	Mel Profit	TE	Toronto Argonauts
40	474	Birmingham Americans	Rayfield Wright	OT	Dallas Cowboys
40	475	Detroit Wheels	Eddie Jenkins	RB	Miami Dolphins
40	476	Jacksonville Sharks	Jerry Moore	DB	New Orleans Saints
40	477	Portland Storm	Leroy Keyes	DB	Kansas City Chiefs
40	478	Philadelphia Bell	Al Dennis	OL	San Diego Chargers
40	479	Toronto Northmen	Tom Butler	OL	Cleveland Browns
40	480	Washington Ambassadors	John Wilbur	OG	Washington Redskins

== 1974 WFL second day pro draft ==
On March 19, 1974, the WFL had a second pro draft to select the rights to players cut by National Football League teams. Each WFL team selected 2 NFL franchises to secure the rights to players not previously selected in the first day 40 rounds pro draft. The New York Giants and Chicago Bears were not drafted.

- Toronto Northmen: Green Bay Packers, Detroit Lions.
- Birmingham Americans: Miami Dolphins, Atlanta Falcons.
- Detroit Wheels: Minnesota Vikings, Buffalo Bills.
- Washington Ambassadors: New England Patriots, Baltimore Colts.
- Philadelphia Bell: Los Angeles Rams, Washington Redskins.
- Portland Storm: Dallas Cowboys, St. Louis Cardinals.
- Jacksonville Sharks: Houston Oilers, Philadelphia Eagles.
- Southern California Sun: San Francisco 49ers, Denver Broncos.
- Chicago Winds: Cincinnati Bengals, Cleveland Browns.
- Houston Texans: Kansas City Chiefs, New Orleans Saints.
- The Hawaiians: San Diego Chargers, Oakland Raiders.
- New York Stars: New York Jets, Pittsburgh Steelers.

== 1975 WFL pro draft ==
In 1975, because of the uncertainties surrounding the league, only a pro draft of entire NFL and CFL teams was done at its league meetings in Birmingham, Alabama. The professional football teams chosen were the following:

- Birmingham Vulcans: Atlanta Falcons, Kansas City Chiefs and Winnipeg Blue Bombers.
- Charlotte Hornets: Baltimore Colts, Detroit Lions and Buffalo Bills.
- Chicago Winds: Pittsburgh Steelers, New York Jets and Edmonton Eskimos.
- The Hawaiians: San Francisco 49ers, Denver Broncos and Philadelphia Eagles.
- Jacksonville Express: Miami Dolphins, Cleveland Browns and Green Bay Packers.
- Memphis Southmen: Toronto Argonauts, St. Louis Cardinals and New England Patriots.
- Philadelphia Bell: Montreal Alouettes, New York Giants and Washington Redskins.
- Portland Thunder: Oakland Raiders, Minnesota Vikings, Ottawa Rough Riders and Saskatchewan Roughriders.
- San Antonio Wings: Dallas Cowboys, Houston Oilers, Calgary Stampeders and Hamilton Tiger-Cats.
- Shreveport Steamer: New Orleans Saints, Chicago Bears and Cincinnati Bengals.
- Southern California Sun: Los Angeles Rams, BC Lions and San Diego Chargers.
