= 1972 Oakland Raiders season =

NFL team season

- Owner: Al Davis
- General manager: Al Davis
- Head coach: John Madden
- Home stadium: Oakland–Alameda County Coliseum

Results
- Record: 10–3–1
- Division place: 1st AFC West
- Playoffs: Lost Divisional Playoffs (at Steelers) 7–13

The 1972 Oakland Raiders season was the team's 13th season. The Raiders won the AFC West for the second time in three seasons. They lost in the AFC Division Round to the Pittsburgh Steelers 13–7 when Franco Harris scored the game-winning touchdown on the Immaculate Reception. The Raiders still dispute that this was an illegal touchdown.

This was the only season that the Raiders made the playoffs between 1967 and 1977 that the Raiders failed to advance to the AFL or AFC Championship Game.

== Offseason ==
=== NFL draft ===
1972 Oakland Raiders draft
Round	Pick	Player	Position	College	Notes
1	21	Mike Siani	Wide receiver	Villanova	
2	33	Kelvin Korver	Offensive tackle	Northwestern (Iowa)	
2	43	John Vella	Offensive tackle	Southern California	
3	72	Mel Lunsford	Defensive tackle	Central State (Ohio)	
4	98	Cliff Branch * ^{†}	Wide receiver	Colorado	
4	100	Dave Dalby *	Center	UCLA	
6	131	Dan Medlin	Defensive tackle	North Carolina State	
7	173	Ray Jamieson	Running back	Memphis	
7	176	Skip Thomas	Defensive back	Southern California	
7	178	Dennis Pete	Defensive back	San Francisco State	
8	202	Jackie Brown	Running back	Stanford	
9	228	Dave Bigler	Running back	Morningside	
10	254	Phillip Price	Defensive back	Idaho State	
11	277	Joe Carroll	Linebacker	Pittsburgh	
12	306	Kent Gaydos	Tight end	Florida State	
13	333	Ted Covington	Wide receiver	San Fernando Valley	
14	358	Dennis Cambal	Running back	William & Mary	
15	365	Charles Hester	Running back	Central State (Ohio)	
15	384	Dave Snesrud	Linebacker	Hamline	
16	410	Willie Wright	Tight end	North Carolina A&T State	
Made roster † Pro Football Hall of Fame * Made at least one Pro Bowl during career

== Personnel ==
=== Staff / Coaches ===
1972 Oakland Raiders staff
Front office: Principal Owner/General Manager - Al Davis; Minority Co-Owner - Ed McGah; Minority Co-Owner - F. Wayne Valley; President of the General Partner / General Manager – Al Davis; Senior Executive – John Herrera; Scout/ Executive assistant, Personnel Director - Ken Herock; Executive Assistant / Scout - Al LoCasale; Head coaches: Head Coach – John Madden; Assistant Head Coach / Executive Assistant - Tom Flores; Offensive coaches: Offensive Backs – Paul Roach; Receivers Coach – Mike Holovak; Offensive line – Ollie Spencer	Defensive coaches: Defensive Line – Tom Dahms; Linebackers – Ray Malavasi; Defensive Backfield – Bob Zeman; Special teams coaches: Special teams – None - N/A

1972 Oakland Raiders roster
Quarterbacks (QB): 16 George Blanda K; 3 Daryle Lamonica; 12 Ken Stabler; Running backs (RB): 40 Pete Banaszak; 28 Clarence Davis; 44 Marv Hubbard; 47 Jeff Queen; 23 Charlie Smith; Wide receivers (WR): 25 Fred Biletnikoff; 21 Cliff Branch; 49 Mike Siani; Tight ends (TE): 87 Raymond Chester; 88 Bob Moore	Offensive linemen (OL): 76 Bob Brown T; 64 George Buehler G; 50 Dave Dalby C; 00 Jim Otto C; 65 Paul Seiler G; 78 Art Shell T; 63 Gene Upshaw G; 75 John Vella T; Defensive linemen (DL): 84 Tony Cline DE; 82 Horace Jones DE; 74 Tom Keating DT; 85 Carleton Oats DT; 60 Otis Sistrunk DT; 80 Art Thoms DT	Linebackers (LB): 55 Dan Conners MLB; 51 Joe Carroll MLB; 86 Gerald Irons OLB; 34 Gus Otto OLB; 45 Greg Slough OLB; 41 Phil Villapiano OLB; Defensive backs (DB): 43 George Atkinson SS; 24 Willie Brown CB; 31 Jack Tatum FS; 26 Skip Thomas CB/S; 20 Jimmy Warren CB; 48 Nemiah Wilson CB; Special teams (ST): 4 Jerry DePoyster P	Practice squad: 30 Dennis Cambal TE; 10 Al Denson WR; 18 Kent Gaydos TE; 56 Warren Koegel C; 71 Kelvin Korver DT; 79 Dan Medlin G; 15 Don Milan QB; Reserve: 83 Ben Davidson DE (IR); 32 Don Highsmith RB (IR); 42 Tommy Maxwell S (IR); 54 Terry Mendenhall LB (IR); Rookies in italics

== Regular season ==
=== Schedule ===
Week	Date	Opponent	Result	Record	Venue	Attendance
1	September 17	at Pittsburgh Steelers	**L** 28–34	0–1	Three Rivers Stadium	50,141
2	September 24	at Green Bay Packers	**W** 20–14	1–1	Lambeau Field	56,263
3	October 1	**San Diego Chargers**	**T** 17–17	1–1–1	Oakland–Alameda County Coliseum	53,455
4	October 9	at Houston Oilers	**W** 34–0	2–1–1	Houston Astrodome	51,378
5	October 15	Buffalo Bills	**W** 28–16	3–1–1	Oakland–Alameda County Coliseum	53,501
6	October 22	**Denver Broncos**	**L** 23–30	3–2–1	Oakland–Alameda County Coliseum	53,551
7	October 29	Los Angeles Rams	**W** 45–17	4–2–1	Oakland–Alameda County Coliseum	54,660
8	November 5	at **Kansas City Chiefs**	**L** 14–27	4–3–1	Arrowhead Stadium	82,094
9	November 12	at Cincinnati Bengals	**W** 20–14	5–3–1	Riverfront Stadium	59,485
10	November 19	at **Denver Broncos**	**W** 37–20	6–3–1	Mile High Stadium	51,656
11	November 26	**Kansas City Chiefs**	**W** 26–3	7–3–1	Oakland–Alameda County Coliseum	54,801
12	December 3	at **San Diego Chargers**	**W** 21–19	8–3–1	San Diego Stadium	54,611
13	December 11	New York Jets	**W** 24–16	9–3–1	Oakland–Alameda County Coliseum	54,843
14	December 17	Chicago Bears	**W** 28–21	10–3–1	Oakland–Alameda County Coliseum	54,711
Note: Intra-division opponents are in **bold** text.

=== Game summaries ===
==== Week 1 ====
Team	1	2	3	4	Total
Raiders	0	7	0	21	28
• Steelers	14	3	10	7	34

- Date: September 17
- Location: Three Rivers Stadium, Pittsburgh, Pennsylvania
- Game start: 1:00 p.m.
- Game weather: 72 °F (22 °C), wind 13 mph (21 km/h)

==== Week 2 ====
Team	1	2	3	4	Total
• Raiders	10	0	10	0	20
Packers	7	7	0	0	14

- Date: September 24
- Location: Lambeau Field, Green Bay, Wisconsin
- Game start: 1:00 p.m. CDT
- Game weather: 61 °F (16 °C), wind 10 mph (16 km/h)
- Referee: Norm Schachter
- Television network: NBC

==== Week 3 ====
Team	1	2	3	4	Total
Chargers	0	7	0	10	17
Raiders	14	0	0	3	17

- Date: October 1
- Location: Oakland–Alameda County Coliseum, Oakland, California
- Game start: 1:00 p.m.
- Game weather: 61 °F (16 °C), wind 10 mph (16 km/h)

==== Week 4 ====
Team	1	2	3	4	Total
• Raiders	3	7	3	21	34
Oilers	0	0	0	0	0

- Date: October 9
- Location: Houston Astrodome, Houston, Texas
- Game start: 8:00 p.m.
- Game weather: indoors (dome)
- TV announcers (ABC): Frank Gifford, Howard Cosell and Don Meredith

==== Week 5 ====
Team	1	2	3	4	Total
Bills	3	10	0	3	16
• Raiders	0	0	7	21	28

- Date: October 15
- Location: Oakland–Alameda County Coliseum, Oakland, California
- Game start: 1:00 p.m.
- Game weather: 62 °F (17 °C), wind 13 mph (21 km/h)

==== Week 6 ====
Team	1	2	3	4	Total
• Broncos	7	17	0	6	30
Raiders	0	3	10	10	23

- Date: October 22
- Location: Oakland–Alameda County Coliseum, Oakland, California
- Game start: 1:00 p.m.
- Game weather: 60 °F (16 °C), wind 5 mph (8.0 km/h)

==== Week 7 ====
Team	1	2	3	4	Total
Rams	0	3	7	7	17
• Raiders	28	7	0	10	45

- Date: October 29
- Location: Oakland–Alameda County Coliseum, Oakland, California
- Game start: 1:00 p.m.
- Game weather: 55 °F (13 °C), wind 13 mph (21 km/h)

==== Week 8 ====
Team	1	2	3	4	Total
Raiders	0	0	7	7	14
• Chiefs	0	17	3	7	27

- Date: November 5
- Location: Arrowhead Stadium, Kansas City, Missouri
- Game start: 3:00 p.m.
- Game weather: 53 °F (12 °C), wind 12 mph (19 km/h)

==== Week 9 ====
Team	1	2	3	4	Total
• Raiders	0	3	7	10	20
Bengals	0	7	0	7	14

- Date: November 12
- Location: Riverfront Stadium, Cincinnati, Ohio
- Game start: 1:00 p.m.
- Game weather: 44 °F (7 °C), wind 6 mph (9.7 km/h)

==== Week 10 ====
Team	1	2	3	4	Total
• Raiders	7	13	3	14	37
Broncos	10	3	0	7	20

- Date: November 19
- Location: Mile High Stadium, Denver, Colorado
- Game start: 12:00 p.m.
- Game weather: 30 °F (−1 °C), wind 9 mph (14 km/h)

==== Week 11 ====
Team	1	2	3	4	Total
Chiefs	0	3	0	0	3
• Raiders	10	13	0	3	26

- Date: November 26
- Location: Oakland–Alameda County Coliseum, Oakland, California
- Game start: 1:00 p.m.
- Game weather: 50 °F (10 °C), wind 8 mph (13 km/h)

==== Week 12 ====
Team	1	2	3	4	Total
• Raiders	7	7	0	7	21
Chargers	0	10	6	3	19

- Date: December 3
- Location: San Diego Stadium, San Diego, California
- Game start: 1:00 p.m.

==== Week 13 ====
Team	1	2	3	4	Total
Jets	7	6	0	3	16
• Raiders	3	7	7	7	24

- Date: December 11
- Location: Oakland–Alameda County Coliseum, Oakland, California
- Game start: 6:00 p.m.
- Game weather: 34 °F (1 °C), wind 9 mph (14 km/h)
- TV announcers (ABC): Frank Gifford, Howard Cosell and Don Meredith

==== Week 14 ====
Team	1	2	3	4	Total
Bears	7	0	7	7	21
• Raiders	7	0	7	14	28

- Date: December 17
- Location: Oakland–Alameda County Coliseum, Oakland, California
- Game start: 1:00 p.m.
- Game weather: 44 °F (7 °C), wind 11 mph (18 km/h)

Scoring summary
1	CHI	Ron Smith 94-yard kickoff return (Mac Percival kick)	CHI 7–0
1	OAK	Charlie Smith 14-yard pass from Daryle Lamonica (George Blanda kick)	Tie 7–7
3	OAK	Charlie Smith 19-yard pass from Ken Stabler (George Blanda kick)	OAK 14–7
3	CHI	Ross Brupbacher recovered fumble in end zone (Mac Percival kick)	Tie 14–14
4	OAK	Pete Banaszak 1 yard run (George Blanda kick)	OAK 21–14
4	OAK	Clarence Davis 45-yard run (George Blanda kick)	OAK 28–14
4	CHI	Don Shy 1 yard run (Mac Percival kick)	OAK 28–21

=== Standings ===
AFC West
	W	L	T	PCT	DIV	CONF	PF	PA	STK
Oakland Raiders	10	3	1	.750	3–2–1	7–3–1	365	248	W6
Kansas City Chiefs	8	6	0	.571	4–2	6–5	287	254	W3
Denver Broncos	5	9	0	.357	2–4	4–6	325	350	W2
San Diego Chargers	4	9	1	.321	2–3–1	4–6–1	264	344	L3

== Playoffs ==
Round	Date	Opponent	Result	Record	Venue	Attendance
Divisional	December 23	at Pittsburgh Steelers	L 7–13	0–1	Three Rivers Stadium	50,350

=== Game summaries ===
Team	1	2	3	4	Total
Raiders	0	0	0	7	7
• Steelers	0	0	3	10	13

- Date: December 23
- Location: Three Rivers Stadium, Pittsburgh, Pennsylvania
- Game start: 1:00 p.m.
- Game weather: 42 °F (6 °C), wind 6 mph (9.7 km/h)
- TV announcers (NBC): Curt Gowdy
