= Gerela =

Gerela is a surname. Notable people with the surname include:

- Metro Gerela (born 1941), Canadian soccer coach and former player
- Roy Gerela (born 1948), Canadian football player, brother of Metro and Ted
- Ted Gerela (1944–2020), Canadian football player
