= 1972 Pittsburgh Steelers season =

Pittsburgh Steelers 40th US football season

- Owner: Art Rooney
- Head coach: Chuck Noll
- Home stadium: Three Rivers Stadium

Results
- Record: 11–3
- Division place: 1st AFC Central
- Playoffs: Won Divisional Playoffs (vs. Raiders) 13–7; Lost AFC Championship (vs. Dolphins) 17–21
- All-Pros: 4: Joe Greene (1st team); Roy Gerela (2nd team); Franco Harris (2nd team); Andy Russell (2nd team)
- Pro Bowlers: 6: LB Henry Davis; PK Roy Gerela; DT Joe Greene; RB Franco Harris; LB Andy Russell; DE Dwight White
- Team MVP: Franco Harris

The 1972 Pittsburgh Steelers season was the team's 40th in the National Football League.

Pittsburgh finished with an 11–3 record in 1972, their first winning season in 9 years (1963), and won their first-ever AFC Central Division title. It was the Steelers' third-ever postseason appearance, first in ten seasons (the Playoff Bowl for third place in the league), and only its second playoff game since 1947. This season is famous for the Immaculate Reception, where the Steelers beat the Oakland Raiders 13–7 in the playoffs on a last second touchdown by rookie running back Franco Harris. But the momentum would not be enough to beat the Dolphins in the AFC Championship despite a strong season.

The rebuilding of the franchise that began in 1969 with the hiring of head coach Chuck Noll finally came to fruition in his fourth year. After winning only once in that first season, the Steelers then showed steady improvement. They broke through in 1972 and made the playoffs for the first time since 1947; their three losses were by a combined eleven points. The division title was the first in team history, as was the appearance in the AFC Championship game which they lost to the undefeated Miami Dolphins 21–17. It was the first of eight consecutive playoff appearances for the Steelers that led to four Super Bowl championships.

== Offseason ==
=== NFL draft ===
1972 Pittsburgh Steelers draft
Round	Pick	Player	Position	College	Notes
1	13	Franco Harris * ^{†}	RB	Penn State	
2	38	Gordon Gravelle	OT	BYU	
3	63	John McMakin	TE	Clemson	
4	80	Lorenzo Brinkley	DB	Missouri	
4	88	Ed Bradley	LB	Wake Forest	
5	113	Steve Furness	DE	Rhode Island	
6	143	Dennis Meyer	DB	Arkansas State	
7	159	Joe Colquitt	DE	Kansas State	
7	168	Robert Kelly	DB	Jackson State	
8	193	Stahle Vincent	RB	Rice	
9	217	Don Kelley	DB	Clemson	
10	243	Bob Brown	DT	Tampa	
11	273	Joe Gilliam	QB	Tennessee State	
12	298	Ron Curl	OT	Michigan State	
13	323	Ernie Messmer	OT	Villanova	
14	348	Tommy Durrance	RB	Florida	
15	368	John Hulecki	OG	UMass	
15	373	Charles Harrington	OG	Wichita State	
16	403	Nate Hawkins	WR	UNLV	
17	428	Ron Linehan	LB	Idaho	
Made roster † Pro Football Hall of Fame * Made at least one Pro Bowl during career

== Personnel ==
=== Staff / Coaches ===
1972 Pittsburgh Steelers staff
Front office: President – Arthur J. Rooney; Vice president – John R. McGinley; Vice president – Daniel M. Rooney; Vice president – Arthur J. Rooney, Jr.; Public relations director – Ed Kiely; Traveling secretary – James A. Boston; Controller – Robert P. Quinn; Publicity director – Joe Gordon; Ticket manager – Joseph H. Carr; Director of player personnel – Dick Haley; Assistant director of player personnel – Bill Nunn; Director of professional scouting – V. Timothy Rooney; Head coaches: Head coach – Chuck Noll; Offensive coaches: Offensive line – Bob Fry; Offensive backfield – Dick Hoak; Quarterbacks – Babe Parilli; Receivers – Lionel Taylor	Defensive coaches: Defensive coordinator – Bud Carson; Defensive line – George Perles; Defensive assistant – Woody Widenhofer; Strength and conditioning: Strength – Louis Riecke; Flexibility – Paul Uram; Team physician, orthopedic – Dr. John Best; Team Physician, M.D. – Dr. David S. Huber; Team dentist – Dr. Robert Gray; Trainer – Ralph Berlin; Assistant trainer – Robert Milie; Equipment manager – Anthony Parisi; Field manager – Jack Hart

=== Roster ===
1972 Pittsburgh Steelers roster
Quarterbacks (QB): 12 Terry Bradshaw; 5 Terry Hanratty; Running backs (RB): 20 Rocky Bleier; 35 Steve Davis; 33 John Fuqua; 32 Franco Harris; 26 Preston Pearson; Wide receivers (WR): 43 Frank Lewis; 25 Ronnie Shanklin; 31 Al Young; Tight ends (TE): 87 Larry Brown; 89 John McMakin	Offensive linemen (OL): 50 Jim Clack G/C; 71 Gordon Gravelle T; 77 Melvin Holmes G; 55 Jon Kolb T; 56 Ray Mansfield C; 72 Gerry Mullins T/G; Defensive linemen (DL): 64 Steve Furness DT; 75 Joe Greene DT; 68 L. C. Greenwood DE; 67 Craig Hanneman DE; 63 Ernie Holmes DT; 60 Ben McGee DT; 78 Dwight White DE	Linebackers (LB): 38 Ed Bradley OLB; 53 Henry Davis MLB; 59 Jack Ham OLB; 34 Andy Russell OLB; 61 Brian Stenger MLB; 90 George Webster OLB; 51 Chuck Winfrey OLB; Defensive backs (DB): 49 Ralph Anderson SS; 47 Mel Blount CB; 29 John Dockery CB; 27 Glen Edwards FS; 48 John Rowser CB; 23 Mike Wagner FS; Special teams (ST): 10 Roy Gerela K; 39 Bobby Walden P	Practice squad: 74 John Brown T; 44 Lee Calland CB; -- Milt Davis LB; 57 Sam Davis G; 41 Dennis Meyer S; 83 Barry Pearson WR; 66 Bruce Van Dyke G; Reserve: 85 Bob Adams TE (IR); 46 Warren Bankston RB (IR); 69 Ron Curl T (IR); 17 Joe Gilliam QB (IR); -- Stahle Vincent RB (IR); Rookies in italics 40 active, 7 reserve, 5 practice squad

=== Depth chart ===
Defense
1972 Pittsburgh Steelers roster

FS
49 Ralph Anderson
27 Glen Edwards
⋅

WLB	MLB	SLB
⋅	53 Henry Davis	⋅
36 Chuck Winfrey	38 Ed Bradley	⋅
61 Brian Stenger	⋅	⋅

SS
23 Mike Wagner
37 Chuck Beatty
⋅

CB
48 John Rowser
29 John Dockery
⋅

DE	DT	DT	DE
78 Dwight White	60 Ben McGee	75 Joe Greene	68 L. C. Greenwood
67 Craig Hanneman	63 Ernie Holmes	64 Steve Furness	⋅
⋅	⋅	⋅	⋅

CB
47 Mel Blount
44 Lee Calland
⋅

Offense
1972 Pittsburgh Steelers roster

WR
43 Frank Lewis
31 Al Young
⋅

LT	LG	C	RG	RT
55 Jon Kolb	57 Sam Davis	56 Ray Mansfield	66 Bruce Van Dyke	72 Gerry Mullins
71 Gordon Gravelle	⋅	50 Jim Clack	77 Mel Holmes	74 John Brown IR
⋅	⋅	⋅	⋅	⋅

TE
89 John McMakin
87 Larry Brown
85 Bob Adams IR

WR
25 Ron Shanklin
88 Dave L. Smith
⋅

QB
12 Terry Bradshaw
5 Terry Hanratty
17 Joe Gilliam

RB
33 John Fuqua
20 Rocky Bleier
35 Steve Davis

FB
32 Franco Harris
26 Preston Pearson
46 Warren Bankston

Special teams
PK 10 Roy Gerela
P 39 Bobby Walden
KR 26 Preston Pearson
PR 27 Glen Edwards
LS 55 Jon Kolb
H 39 Bobby Walden

== Regular season ==
=== Schedule ===
Week	Date	Opponent	Result	Record	Venue
1	September 17	Oakland Raiders	**W** 34–28	1–0	Three Rivers Stadium
2	September 24	at **Cincinnati Bengals**	**L** 10–15	1–1	Riverfront Stadium
3	October 1	at St. Louis Cardinals	**W** 25–19	2–1	Busch Memorial Stadium
4	October 8	at Dallas Cowboys	**L** 13–17	2–2	Texas Stadium
5	October 15	**Houston Oilers**	**W** 24–7	3–2	Three Rivers Stadium
6	October 22	New England Patriots	**W** 33–3	4–2	Three Rivers Stadium
7	October 29	at Buffalo Bills	**W** 38–21	5–2	War Memorial Stadium
8	November 5	Cincinnati Bengals	**W** 40–17	6–2	Three Rivers Stadium
9	November 12	Kansas City Chiefs	**W** 16–7	7–2	Three Rivers Stadium
10	November 19	at **Cleveland Browns**	**L** 24–26	7–3	Cleveland Municipal Stadium
11	November 26	Minnesota Vikings	**W** 23–10	8–3	Three Rivers Stadium
12	December 3	**Cleveland Browns**	**W** 30–0	9–3	Three Rivers Stadium
13	December 10	at **Houston Oilers**	**W** 9–3	10–3	Astrodome
14	December 17	at San Diego Chargers	**W** 24–2	11–3	San Diego Stadium
Note: Intra-division opponents are in **bold** text.

=== Game summaries ===
==== Week 1: vs. Oakland Raiders ====
Team	1	2	3	4	Total
Raiders	0	7	0	21	28
• **Steelers**	14	3	10	7	34

- Date: Sunday, September 17
- Location: Three Rivers Stadium, Pittsburgh
- Game start: 1:00 p.m. local
- Game attendance: 51,141
- Game weather: 72 F, wind 13 mph
- Referee: Pat Haggerty

Scoring summary
1	PIT	Henry Davis 5-yard blocked punt return (Roy Gerela kick)	PIT 7–0
1	PIT	Terry Bradshaw 20-yard run (Roy Gerela kick)	PIT 14–0
2	PIT	Roy Gerela 48-yard field goal	PIT 17–0
2	OAK	Raymond Chester 26-yard pass from George Blanda (George Blanda kick)	PIT 17–7
3	PIT	Roy Gerela 8-yard field goal	PIT 20–7
3	PIT	Terry Bradshaw 2-yard run (Roy Gerela kick)	PIT 27–7
4	OAK	Mike Siani 24-yard pass from Daryle Lamonica (George Blanda kick)	PIT 27–14
4	PIT	Ron Shanklin 57-yard pass from Terry Bradshaw (Roy Gerela kick)	PIT 34–14
4	OAK	Don Highsmith 1-yard run (George Blanda kick)	PIT 34–21
4	OAK	Mike Siani 70-yard pass from Daryle Lamonica (George Blanda kick)	PIT 34–28

The Steelers were able to start off against the Raiders at home scoring 17 unanswered points (2TDs/PATs and a FG) and eventually ended up defeating the team by 6 for a 34–28 victory and a 1–0 start.

==== Week 2: at Cincinnati Bengals ====
Team	1	2	3	4	Total
Steelers	0	10	0	0	10
• **Bengals**	3	0	6	6	15

- Date: Sunday, September 24
- Location: Riverfront Stadium, Cincinnati
- Game start: 1:00 p.m. local
- Game attendance: 54,292
- Game weather: 69 F, wind 9 mph
- Referee: Dick Jorgensen

Scoring summary
1	CIN	Horst Muhlmann 41-yard field goal	CIN 3–0
2	PIT	Terry Bradshaw 12-yard run (Roy Gerela kick)	PIT 7–3
2	PIT	Roy Gerela 17-yard field goal	PIT 10–3
3	CIN	Horst Muhlmann 32-yard field goal	PIT 10–6
3	CIN	Horst Muhlmann 20-yard field goal	PIT 10–9
4	CIN	Horst Muhlmann 32-yard field goal	CIN 12–10
4	CIN	Horst Muhlmann 34-yard field goal	CIN 15–10

==== Week 3: at St. Louis Cardinals ====
Team	1	2	3	4	Total
• **Steelers**	3	12	0	10	25
Cardinals	0	6	6	7	19

- Date: Sunday, October 1
- Location: Busch Memorial Stadium, St. Louis, Missouri
- Game start: 1:00 p.m. local
- Game attendance: 49,140
- Game weather: 58 F, wind 10 mph
- Referee: Fred Wyant

Scoring summary
1	PIT	Roy Gerela 17-yard field goal	PIT 3–0
2	PIT	Roy Gerela 20-yard field goal	PIT 6–0
2	STL	Jim Bakken 19-yard field goal	PIT 6–3
2	PIT	Terry Bradshaw 1-yard run (Roy Gerela kick)	PIT 13–3
2	PIT	Safety, Donny Anderson tackled by Ralph Anderson in end zone	PIT 15–3
2	STL	Jim Bakken 44-yard field goal	PIT 15–6
3	STL	Donny Anderson 8-yard run (kick failed)	PIT 15–12
3	PIT	Roy Gerela 15-yard field goal	PIT 18–12
4	STL	Norm Thompson 8-yard blocked punt return (Jim Bakken kick)	STL 19–18
4	PIT	Frank Lewis 38-yard pass from Terry Bradshaw (Roy Gerela kick)	PIT 25–19

==== Week 4: at Dallas Cowboys ====
Team	1	2	3	4	Total
Steelers	6	7	0	0	13
• **Cowboys**	3	7	7	0	17

- Date: Sunday, October 8
- Location: Texas Stadium, Irving, Texas
- Game start: 1:00 p.m. local
- Game attendance: 65,682
- Game weather: 68 F, wind 8 mph
- Referee: Ben Dreith

Scoring summary
1	PIT	Roy Gerela 39-yard field goal	PIT 3–0
1	DAL	Toni Fritsch 40-yard field goal	Tied 3–3
1	PIT	Roy Gerela 39-yard field goal	PIT 6–3
2	PIT	Mel Blount 35-yard fumble return (Roy Gerela kick)	PIT 13–3
2	DAL	Calvin Hill 1-yard run (Toni Fritsch kick)	PIT 13–10
3	DAL	Ron Sellers 55-yard pass from Calvin Hill (Toni Fritsch kick)	DAL 17–13

==== Week 5: vs. Houston Oilers ====
Team	1	2	3	4	Total
Oilers	7	0	0	0	7
• **Steelers**	0	10	7	7	24

- Date: Sunday, October 15
- Location: Three Rivers Stadium, Pittsburgh
- Game start: 4:00 p.m. local
- Game attendance: 42,929
- Game weather: 47 F, wind 14 mph
- Referee: Bernie Ulman

Scoring summary
1	HOU	Ward Walsh recovered blocked punt in end zone (Skip Butler kick)	HOU 7–0
2	PIT	Roy Gerela 28-yard field goal	HOU 7–3
2	PIT	Franco Harris 1-yard run (Roy Gerela kick)	PIT 10–7
3	PIT	Frank Lewis 11-yard pass from Terry Bradshaw (Roy Gerela kick)	PIT 17–7
4	PIT	Terry Bradshaw 8-yard run (Roy Gerela kick)	PIT 24–7

==== Week 6: vs. New England Patriots ====
Team	1	2	3	4	Total
Patriots	0	0	3	0	3
• **Steelers**	10	7	13	3	33

- Date: Sunday, October 22
- Location: Three Rivers Stadium, Pittsburgh
- Game start: 1:00 p.m. local
- Game attendance: 46,081
- Game weather: 52 F, wind 9 mph
- Referee: Norm Schachter

Scoring summary
1	PIT	Roy Gerela 19-yard field goal	PIT 3–0
1	PIT	Jack Ham 32-yard interception return (Roy Gerela kick)	PIT 10–0
2	PIT	Ron Shanklin 30-yard pass from Terry Bradshaw (Roy Gerela kick)	PIT 17–0
3	PIT	Roy Gerela 22-yard field goal	PIT 20–0
3	NE	Charlie Gogolak 16-yard field goal	PIT 20–3
3	PIT	Steve Davis 28-yard run (Roy Gerela kick)	PIT 27–3
3	PIT	Roy Gerela 35-yard field goal	PIT 30–3
4	PIT	Roy Gerela 33-yard field goal	PIT 33–3

==== Week 7: at Buffalo Bills ====
Team	1	2	3	4	Total
• **Steelers**	0	17	7	14	38
Bills	0	0	7	14	21

- Date: Sunday, October 29
- Location: War Memorial Stadium, Buffalo, New York
- Game start: 1:00 p.m. local
- Game attendance: 45,882
- Game weather: 47 F, wind 10 mph
- Referee: Tommy Bell

Scoring summary
2	PIT	Franco Harris 2-yard run (Roy Gerela kick)	PIT 7–0
2	PIT	Terry Bradshaw 2-yard run (Roy Gerela kick)	PIT 14–0
2	PIT	Roy Gerela 29-yard field goal	PIT 17–0
3	BUF	O.J. Simpson 94-yard run (John Leypoldt kick)	PIT 17–7
3	PIT	Franco Harris 18-yard run (Roy Gerela kick)	PIT 24–7
4	BUF	Bob Chandler 11-yard pass from Dennis Shaw (John Leypoldt kick)	PIT 24–14
4	PIT	Franco Harris 17-yard pass from Terry Bradshaw (Roy Gerela kick)	PIT 31–14
4	BUF	Bob Chandler 4-yard pass from Dennis Shaw (John Leypoldt kick)	PIT 31–21
4	PIT	John Fuqua 4-yard run (Roy Gerela kick)	PIT 38–21

==== Week 8: vs. Cincinnati Bengals ====
Team	1	2	3	4	Total
Bengals	0	0	14	3	17
• **Steelers**	10	16	7	7	40

- Date: Sunday, November 5
- Location: Three Rivers Stadium, Pittsburgh
- Game start: 1:00 p.m. local
- Game attendance: 50,350
- Game weather: 44 F, wind 10 mph
- Referee: Fred Silva

Scoring summary
1	PIT	John Fuqua 7-yard run (Roy Gerela kick)	PIT 7–0
1	PIT	Roy Gerela 15-yard field goal	PIT 10–0
2	PIT	Roy Gerela 22-yard field goal	PIT 13–0
2	PIT	Frank Lewis 28-yard pass from Terry Bradshaw (kick failed)	PIT 19–0
2	PIT	Larry Brown 13-yard pass from Terry Bradshaw (Roy Gerela kick)	PIT 26–0
3	CIN	Virgil Carter 1-yard run (Horst Muhlmann kick)	PIT 26–7
3	PIT	Frank Lewis 34-yard pass from Terry Bradshaw (Roy Gerela kick)	PIT 33–7
3	CIN	Chip Myers 2-yard pass from Virgil Carter (Horst Muhlmann kick)	PIT 33–14
4	PIT	Franco Harris 2-yard run (Roy Gerela kick)	PIT 40–14
4	CIN	Horst Muhlmann 37-yard field goal	PIT 40–17

==== Week 9: vs. Kansas City Chiefs ====
Team	1	2	3	4	Total
Chiefs	0	7	0	0	7
• Steelers	0	0	3	13	16

- Date: Sunday, November 12
- Location: Three Rivers Stadium
- Game start: 1:00 p.m. local
- Game attendance: 54,476
- Referee: Jim Tunney

Scoring drives:

- Kansas City – Kearney 65 interception return (Stenerud kick) – Chiefs 7–0
- Pittsburgh – FG Gerela 25 – Chiefs 7–3
- Pittsburgh – FG Gerela 10 – Chiefs 7–6
- Pittsburgh – FG Gerela 49 – Steelers 9–7
- Pittsburgh – Harris 7 run (Gerela kick) – Steelers 16–7

==== Week 10: Cleveland Browns ====
Team	1	2	3	4	Total
Steelers	3	7	7	7	24
• Browns	10	10	3	3	26

- Date: Sunday, November 19
- Location: Cleveland Municipal Stadium
- Game start: 1:00 p.m. local
- Game attendance: 83,009
- Game weather: 37 F, wind 8 mph
- Referee: Dick Jorgensen

Scoring drives:

- Pittsburgh – FG Gerela 39 – Steelers 3–0
- Cleveland – FG Cockroft 26 – Tie 3–3
- Cleveland – Phipps 1 run (Cockroft kick) – Browns 10–3
- Cleveland – FG Cockroft 38 – Browns 13–3
- Cleveland – Pitts 17 pass from Phipps (Cockroft kick) – Browns 20–3
- Pittsburgh – Mullins 3 pass from Bradshaw (Gerela kick) – Browns 20–10
- Cleveland – FG Cockroft 12 – Browns 23–10
- Pittsburgh – Fuqua 1 run (Gerela kick) – Browns 23–17
- Pittsburgh – Harris 75 run (Gerela kick)- Steelers 24–23
- Cleveland – FG Cockroft 26 – Browns 26–24

==== Week 11: vs. Minnesota Vikings ====
Minnesota Vikings (6–4) at Pittsburgh Steelers (7–3)

Quarter	1	2	3	4	Total
Vikings	3	0	0	7	**10**
Steelers	7	0	3	13	**23**

at Three Rivers Stadium • Pittsburgh, Pennsylvania

- Date: Sunday, November 26
- Game time: 1:00 p.m. EDT
- Game weather: 38 °F (3 °C) • Wind 18 miles per hour (29 km/h; 16 kn)
- Game attendance: 50,348
- TV announcers (CBS): Jack Drees, George Connor, and Andy Musser
- Pro-Football-Reference.com

Game information

Vikings

- Fran Tarkenton
  24/43, 235 Yds, TD, INT
- Oscar Reed
  16 Rush, 56 Yds
- Ed Marinaro
  9 Rec, 62 Yds

Steelers

- Terry Bradshaw
  7/19, 93 Yds, TD, INT
- Franco Harris
  17 Rush, 128 Yds, TD
- Ron Shanklin
  2 Rec, 52 Yds

Scoring summary

Quarter	Time	Drive			Team	Scoring information	Score	
Quarter	Time	Plays	Yards	TOP	Team	Scoring information	MIN	PIT
1					Vikings	24-yard field goal by Fred Cox	3	0
1					Steelers	Franco Harris 12-yard touchdown run, Roy Gerela kick good	3	7
3					Steelers	17-yard field goal by Roy Gerela	3	10
4					Vikings	Stu Voigt 5-yard touchdown reception from Fran Tarkenton, Fred Cox kick good	10	10
4					Steelers	Terry Bradshaw 1-yard touchdown run, Roy Gerela kick no good (blocked)	10	16
4					Steelers	Frank Lewis 17-yard touchdown reception from Terry Bradshaw, Roy Gerela kick good	10	23
"TOP" = time of possession. For other American football terms, see Glossary of American football.							10	23

==== Week 12: vs. Cleveland Browns ====
Team	1	2	3	4	Total
Browns	0	0	0	0	0
• Steelers	3	7	7	13	30

- Date: Sunday, December 3
- Location: Three Rivers Stadium
- Game start: 1:00 p.m. local
- Game attendance: 50,350
- Game weather: 44 F, wind 14 mph
- Referee: Tommy Bell

Franco Harris breaks Jim Brown's record for consecutive 100 yd games.

Scoring drives:

- Pittsburgh – FG Gerela 19 – Steelers 3–0
- Pittsburgh – Harris 1 run (Gerela kick) – Steelers 10–0
- Pittsburgh – Harris 11 run (Gerela kick) – Steelers 17–0
- Pittsburgh – McMakin 78 pass from Bradshaw (Gerela kick) – Steelers 24–0
- Pittsburgh – FG Gerela 44 – Steelers 27–0
- Pittsburgh – FG Gerela 37 – Steelers 30–0

==== Week 13: at Houston Oilers ====
Team	1	2	3	4	Total
• Steelers	3	0	6	0	9
Oilers	0	3	0	0	3

- Date: Sunday, December 10
- Location: Houston Astrodome
- Game start: 1:00 p.m. local
- Game attendance: 36,528
- Referee: John McDonough

Scoring drives:

- Pittsburgh – FG Gerela 24 – Steelers 3–0
- Houston – FG Butler 34 – Tie 3–3
- Pittsburgh – FG Gerela 39 – Steelers 6–3
- Pittsburgh – FG Gerela 13 – Steelers 9–3

Steelers clinch their 1st playoff berth.

==== Week 14: San Diego Chargers ====
Team	1	2	3	4	Total
• Steelers	7	7	3	7	24
Chargers	2	0	0	0	2

- Date: Sunday, December 17
- Location: San Diego Stadium
- Game start: 1:00 p.m. local
- Game weather: 60 F, wind 6 mph
- Referee: Pat Haggerty

The Pittsburgh Steelers clinched their first AFC Central Division title. The day before the game Frank Sinatra is inducted into Franco's Italian Army.

Scoring drives:

- Pittsburgh – Harris 7 yd run (Gerela kick) Steelers 7-0
- San Diego – Safety, Costa tackled Bradshaw in end zone – Steelers 7-2
- Pittsburgh – Fuqua 2 run (Gerela kick) – Steelers 14–2
- Pittsburgh – FG Gerela 24 – Steelers 17–2
- Pittsburgh – Shanklin 17 pass from Bradshaw (Gerela kick) – Steelers 24–2

=== Standings ===
AFC Central
	W	L	T	PCT	DIV	CONF	PF	PA	STK
Pittsburgh Steelers	11	3	0	.786	4–2	9–2	343	175	W4
Cleveland Browns	10	4	0	.714	5–1	9–2	268	249	W2
Cincinnati Bengals	8	6	0	.571	3–3	6–5	299	229	W1
Houston Oilers	1	13	0	.071	0–6	1–10	164	380	L11

== Postseason ==
=== Game summaries ===
==== AFC Divisional: vs. Oakland Raiders ====
Team	1	2	3	4	Total
Raiders	0	0	0	7	7
• Steelers	0	0	3	10	13

- Date: Saturday, December 23
- Location: Three Rivers Stadium, Pittsburgh
- Game start: 1:00 p.m. EST
- Game attendance: 50,327
- Game weather: 42°F, wind 6 mph
- Referee: Fred Swearingen
- TV announcers (NBC): Curt Gowdy and Al DeRogatis

Scoring summary
3	PIT	Roy Gerela 18-yard field goal	PIT 3–0
4	PIT	Roy Gerela 29-yard field goal	PIT 6–0
4	OAK	Ken Stabler 30-yard run (George Blanda kick)	OAK 7–6
4	PIT	Franco Harris 60-yard pass from Terry Bradshaw (Gerela kick)	PIT 13–7

==== AFC Championship: vs. Miami Dolphins ====
Team	1	2	3	4	Total
• Dolphins	0	7	7	7	21
Steelers	7	0	3	7	17

- Date: Sunday, December 31
- Location: Three Rivers Stadium
- Game start: 12 p.m. EST
- Game attendance: 50,845
- Game weather: Partly cloudy, 58°F (wind 16 mph)
- Referee: Ben Dreith
- TV announcers (NBC): Curt Gowdy and Al DeRogatis
- PIT – Mullins recovered fumble in end zone (Gerela kick) PIT 7–0
- MIA – Csonka 9 pass from Morrall (Yepremian kick) 7–7
- PIT – FG Gerela 14 11:00 3rd PIT 10–7
- MIA – Kiick 2 run (Yepremian kick) MIA 14–10
- MIA – Kiick 3 run (Yepremian kick) MIA 21–10
- PIT – Young 12 pass from Bradshaw (Gerela kick) MIA 21–17
