= Ralph Anderson (defensive back) =

American football player (1949–2016)

No. 49
- Position: Defensive back

Personal information
- Born: April 3, 1949; Dallas, Texas, U.S.
- Died: December 20, 2016 (aged 67)
- Listed height: 6 ft 2 in (1.88 m)
- Listed weight: 180 lb (82 kg)

Career information
- High school: Lincoln (TX)
- College: West Texas State
- NFL draft: 1971: 5th round, 126th overall pick

Career history
- Pittsburgh Steelers (1971–1972); New England Patriots (1973)

Career NFL statistics
- Games: 34
- Interceptions: 6
- Fumble recoveries: 5
- Stats at Pro Football Reference

Ralph Edward Anderson (April 3, 1949 – December 20, 2016) was an American professional football defensive back in the National Football League (NFL).

After attending West Texas State (later renamed West Texas A&M), Anderson was selected 126th overall by the Pittsburgh Steelers in the fifth round of the 1971 NFL draft. He played for the Steelers for two years, starting 21 games at free safety and recording four interceptions.

In 1973, he moved on to the New England Patriots where he played a final season.
