= Brad Holmes =

American football executive (born 1979)

Detroit Lions
- Title: Executive vice president and general manager

Personal information
- Born: July 29, 1979 (age 47); Tampa, Florida, U.S.

Career information
- Position: Defensive tackle
- High school: George D. Chamberlain (Tampa)
- College: North Carolina A&T

Career history
- St. Louis Rams (2003–2012) Scout; St. Louis / Los Angeles Rams (2013–2020) Director of college scouting; Detroit Lions (2021–present) Executive vice president & general manager

Awards and highlights
- 2x PFWA Executive of the Year (2023, 2024)
- Executive profile at Pro Football Reference

Brad Holmes (born July 29, 1979) is an American professional football executive who is the executive vice president and general manager of the Detroit Lions of the National Football League (NFL). He previously served with the St. Louis / Los Angeles Rams in various executive roles from 2003 to 2020. Holmes was named to both the 2023 and 2024 PFWA Executive of the Year award.

== Education and playing career ==
Holmes graduated George D. Chamberlain High School in Tampa, Florida in 1997, where he was captain of the football team, and was also elected homecoming king. Holmes graduated cum laude from North Carolina A&T in 2002 with a Bachelor of Science in Journalism and Mass Communications, and was a four-year letterman for the Aggies at defensive tackle under head coach Bill Hayes. In 1999, he was voted team captain and helped A&T win the Mid-Eastern Athletic Conference and Black college football national championship. While visiting home after the 1999 season, Holmes was involved in a car accident that left him in a coma for a week. After making a full recovery, he was cleared to play his final season of college football in 2001.

== Executive career ==
Holmes worked for Enterprise Rent-A-Car while attempting to begin a career in professional sports. He soon obtained a public relations internship with the Atlanta Hawks of the National Basketball Association (NBA) in 2002, which he parlayed into a public relations internship with the St. Louis Rams of the NFL in 2003.

=== St. Louis / Los Angeles Rams ===
In 2003, Holmes was hired by the St. Louis Rams as a public relations intern. While in St. Louis, Holmes struck up a friendship with Wilbert Montgomery, a two-time All-Pro running back and Rams running backs coach from 1997 to 2005. At the conclusion of the public relations internship, Montgomery assisted Holmes in securing a position in the Rams player personnel department. From 2003 to 2012, Holmes served in a number of front office positions with the Rams, including scout, area scout, national Combine scout, and scouting assistant. Since joining the Rams in 2003, Holmes worked under Rams front office executives Charley Armey, Billy Devaney, and Les Snead.

In 2013, Holmes was promoted to director of college scouting. In this role, Holmes was integral in the acquisition of Rams "Mob Squad" Pro Bowlers Aaron Donald, Jared Goff, Todd Gurley, Cooper Kupp, Pharoh Cooper, and Cory Littleton.

=== Detroit Lions ===
On January 14, 2021, Holmes was named the executive vice president and general manager of the Detroit Lions. Holmes signed a five-year contract, succeeding prior general manager Bob Quinn. Holmes' first transaction as general manager was trading longtime franchise quarterback Matthew Stafford to the Los Angeles Rams in exchange for quarterback Jared Goff, two first round picks, and a third round pick.

== Personal life ==
Holmes is the son of Melvin Holmes, who played offensive line for the Pittsburgh Steelers from 1971 to 1973. He is also the nephew of former Detroit Lions defensive back Luther Bradley, a 1978 first-round draft pick. Holmes' cousin, Alex Barron, was a first-round pick of the Rams in 2005. Holmes is married and has a son and daughter.
