= Virgil Robinson =

American football player (born 1947)

Virgil I. Robinson Jr.
No. 46, 47
- Position: Running back

Personal information
- Born: November 2, 1947 (age 79); Inverness, Mississippi, U.S.
- Listed height: 5 ft 11 in (1.80 m)
- Listed weight: 195 lb (88 kg)

Career information
- High school: L.B. Landry (New Orleans, Louisiana)
- College: Grambling State
- NFL draft: 1971: 2nd round, 46th overall pick

Career history
- New Orleans Saints (1971–1972); Houston Texans / Shreveport Steamer (1974–1975)

Career NFL statistics
- Rushing attempts: 34
- Rushing yards: 97
- Rushing TDs: 1
- Stats at Pro Football Reference

Virgil I. Robinson Jr. (born November 2, 1947) is an American former professional football player who was a running back for the New Orleans Saints of the National Football League. He played college football for the Grambling State Tigers. He was also a member of the Houston Texans / Shreveport Steamer in the World Football League.

== Early life ==
Robinson attended L.B. Landry High School. He accepted a football scholarship from Grambling State University. He was Grambling's leading rusher in 1970, with 884 yards. That same year, he was named a first-team All-Southwestern Athletic Conference running back.

== Professional career ==
Robinson was selected by the Green Bay Packers in the second round (46th overall) of the 1971 NFL draft. The Packers acquired that draft pick from the Los Angeles Rams in exchange for running back Travis Williams and a 4th round draft pick. Despite being their 2nd round draft choice, he was cut by the Packers before the 1971 season after attempts to use him at both running back and cornerback during preseason. The New Orleans Saints then signed him off waivers. He played for the Saints as a running back and kick returner in 1971 and 1972. He was placed on the Saints' taxi squad after playing 3 games in 1972. He signed with the Pittsburgh Steelers before the 1973 season but quit the team before playing a regular season game for them.

In March 1974, he was selected by the Jacksonville Sharks in the first round (5th overall) of the WFL Pro Draft. He was later traded to the Houston Texans, which would become the Shreveport Steamer. Robinson ran for 647 yards in his career on 189 attempts, scoring 3 rushing touchdowns. He also caught 27 passes for 156 yards and 1 receiving touchdown.

== Post-football life ==
Robinson was named to the Grambling Legends Hall of Fame in 2016.
