= Art Seitz =

American sports photographer (1942–2025)

Art Seitz (cropped)

Arthur MacGregor Seitz III (October 7, 1942 – August 23, 2025) was an American sports photographer who specialized in tennis. He photographed every US Open from 1968 to 2018.

== Life and career ==
Arthur MacGregor Seitz III was born in Lakewood Township, New Jersey on October 7, 1942. He played tennis in his high school, Lake Wales High School, and was accepted into the University of Florida on a tennis scholarship, majoring in advertising and graduating in 1965. He served in the United States Air Force as a captain for four years.

He began photographing for extra money, but eventually did it permanently. Seitz was a sports photographer, particularly in tennis. He worked for over 50 years, and photographed 50 Wimbledon Championships, 50 U.S. Opens, and more than 50 French Opens. He worked with the Gamma photo agency for over 20 years.

Seitz died of heart and kidney failure in Fort Lauderdale, Florida, on August 23, 2025, at the age of 82.
