= Lake Wales High School =

Coordinates: 27.9167°N 81.5797°W

Location
- 1 Highlander Way; Lake Wales, Florida 33853; United States

Information
- Type: Charter school
- Founded: 1921
- Principal: Anuj Saran
- Staff: 72.00 (FTE)
- Faculty: 90
- Grades: 9-12
- Enrollment: 1,599 (2023–2024)
- Student to teacher ratio: 22.21
- Campus: Suburban
- Colors: Black; Orange
- Athletics: Florida High School Athletic Association
- Mascot: Highlanders
- Website: http://www.lakewaleshigh.com/

Lake Wales High School is a high school located in Lake Wales, Florida, serving the city of Lake Wales and nearby communities such as Frostproof, Dundee, and Winter Haven, Florida. It is part of Lake Wales Charter Schools.

== History ==
Lake Wales served white students only until 1968, when Federally mandated integration required the school to take in 260 black students from Roosevelt High School, which was then repurposed as a junior high school.

== Alumni ==
- Maikon Bonani - Former professional football player
- Pat Borders - Major League Baseball catcher 1988–2005, MVP of 1992 World Series for Toronto Blue Jays, Olympic gold medalist
- Dave Braggins - Former professional football player
- Walter Clayton Jr. - basketball player
- Wade Davis - Major League Baseball pitcher
- Gervon Dexter - Professional Football Player for the Chicago Bears
- Dominique Jones - pro basketball player
- Rolan Milligan - football safety who is currently on the Indianapolis Colts
- Art Seitz - sports photographer
- Amare Stoudemire - NBA power forward and center

== See also ==
- Polk County Public Schools
