= Lake Wales Charter Schools =

School district in Florida, United States

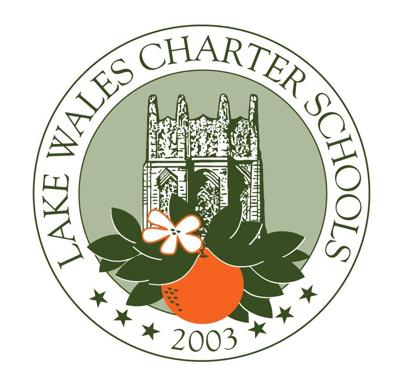
- 130 East Central Avenue Lake Wales, Polk County, Florida, 33853

District information
- Type: Public Charter School District
- Established: October 22, 2003; 22 years ago
- Superintendent: Julie Conrad-Peters
- School board: Members: Nicole Sealey; Andy Blair; Brian Marbutt; Lori Hutto; Tonya Stewart; Paul Gerrard; Rafael Unzueta
- Chair of the board: Danny Gill
- NCES District ID: 1200080

Other information
- Website: www.lwcharterschools.com

Lake Wales Charter Schools (LWCS) is a public charter school district headquartered in Lake Wales, Florida. The district serves the city of Lake Wales and nearby communities such as Frostproof, Dundee, and Winter Haven, Florida.

== History ==
=== Founding ===
In November 2002, consensus in the community that education had become a significant concern. Emphasis was placed on the importance of creating a solution that would benefit all students across various schools, without elitist distinctions. All students were seen as needing a solid foundation in fundamental subjects, particularly reading.

== Schools ==
=== Elementary schools ===
- Dale R. Fair Babson Park Elementary
- Hillcrest Elementary School
- Janie Howard Wilson Elementary School
- Polk Avenue Elementary School

=== Middle schools ===
- Edward W. Bok Academy (South campus)
- Edward W. Bok Academy (North Campus)

=== High school ===
- Lake Wales High School
