= Dennis Cambal =

American football player (1949–2018)

No. 30
- Position: Tight end

Personal information
- Born: January 27, 1949; Waltham, Massachusetts, U.S.
- Died: September 9, 2018 (aged 69); Barnstable, Massachusetts, U.S.
- Listed height: 6 ft 2 in (1.88 m)
- Listed weight: 225 lb (102 kg)

Career information
- High school: Phillips Academy (Andover, Massachusetts)
- College: William & Mary
- NFL draft: 1972: 14th round, 358th overall pick

Career history
- New York Jets (1973)

Career NFL statistics
- Games played: 8
- Stats at Pro Football Reference

Dennis Hayden Cambal (January 27, 1949 – September 9, 2018) was an American professional football player for the National Football League (NFL)'s New York Jets. He played the running back position in college at William & Mary. He was selected 358th overall by the Oakland Raiders in the 14th round of the 1972 NFL draft and was placed on their taxi squad for the 1972 season but then was cut. The Jets signed him as a free agent before the 1973 season and he made the team, playing in eight games mostly as a tight end and on special teams. He missed five games in October and November due to an injury he suffered in the Jets' October 21 game against the Pittsburgh Steelers. In 1974, he crossed the Jets' picket line during the 1974 NFL strike during the preseason, but was waived before the regular season started.

He died on September 9, 2018, in Barnstable, Massachusetts at age 69.
