= Dave Braggins =

American gridiron football player (1945–2004)

Profile
- Position: Guard

Personal information
- Born: January 9, 1945; Lake Wales, Florida, U.S.
- Died: July 19, 2004 (aged 59); Tampa, Florida, U.S.
- Listed height: 6 ft 2 in (1.88 m)
- Listed weight: 240 lb (109 kg)

Career information
- High school: Lake Wales (FL)
- College: Florida State

Career history
- 1968–1971: Ottawa Rough Riders
- 1972–1976: Montreal Alouettes

Awards and highlights
- 3× Grey Cup champion (1968, 1969, 1974); Leo Dandurand Trophy (1975); 2× CFL All-Star (1975, 1976); 2× CFL East All-Star (1975, 1976)

David M. Braggins Jr. (January 9, 1945 – July 19, 2004) was a professional Canadian football offensive lineman who played nine seasons in the Canadian Football League for two different teams. He won the Leo Dandurand Trophy in 1975 and also was named CFL All-Star that season, and was a part of three Grey Cup championship teams with the Ottawa Rough Riders in 1968 and 1969, and the Montreal Alouettes in 1974. Braggins played college football at Florida State University.
