= Mark Kosmos =

American gridiron football player (1945–2020)

Profile
- Position: Linebacker

Personal information
- Born: October 28, 1945; Baltimore, Maryland, U.S.
- Died: November 11, 2020 (aged 75); Ottawa, Ontario, Canada
- Listed height: 6 ft 0 in (1.83 m)
- Listed weight: 235 lb (107 kg)

Career information
- High school: Patterson (Baltimore, Maryland)
- College: Oklahoma

Career history
- 1968–1969: Pottstown Firebirds
- 1970–1971: Montreal Alouettes
- 1972–1973: Hamilton Tiger-Cats
- 1973–1977: Ottawa Rough Riders

Awards and highlights
- 4× Grey Cup champion (1970, 1972, 1973, 1976); 2× CFL All-Star (1971, 1976); 3× CFL East All-Star (1971, 1975, 1976)

Mark Kosmos (October 28, 1945 – November 11, 2020) was an American football player in the ACFL, for the Pottstown Firebirds in 1968 and 1969 and in the CFL for eight years. He played linebacker for the Montreal Alouettes, Hamilton Tiger-Cats and Ottawa Rough Riders from 1970 to 1977. Kosmo played college football at the University of Oklahoma.

Kosmos died in Ottawa in November 2020. He was afflicted with dementia symptoms and contracted COVID-19 in the time leading up to his death, amid the COVID-19 pandemic in Ottawa.
