= Roy Gerela =

Canadian gridiron football player (born 1948)

No. 3, 10, 9
- Position: Placekicker

Personal information
- Born: April 2, 1948 (age 78); Sarrail, Alberta, Canada
- Listed height: 5 ft 10 in (1.78 m)
- Listed weight: 185 lb (84 kg)

Career information
- High school: Kalani (Honolulu, Hawaii, U.S.)
- College: New Mexico State
- NFL draft: 1969: 4th round, 96th overall pick

Career history
- Houston Oilers (1969–1970); Pittsburgh Steelers (1971–1978); San Diego Chargers (1979)

Awards and highlights
- 3× Super Bowl champion (IX, X, XIII); 2× Second-team All-Pro (1972, 1974); 2× Pro Bowl (1972, 1974); PFW Golden Toe Award (1974); Pittsburgh Steelers 50th Anniversary Team

Career NFL/AFL statistics
- Field goals: 184/306
- Field goals %: 60.1
- Longest field goal: 50
- Extra points: 351/365
- Stats at Pro Football Reference

Carl Roy Gerela (born April 2, 1948) is a Canadian former professional football player who was a placekicker in the American Football League (AFL) and National Football League (NFL). He won three Super Bowls with the Pittsburgh Steelers.

Gerela graduated from Kalani High School in Honolulu, and played college football for the New Mexico State Aggies. He was selected in the fourth round of the 1969 NFL/AFL draft by the Houston Oilers and played for them in the American Football League in 1969, as well as their first NFL season of 1970.

Gerela signed with the Steelers before the 1971 season, and quickly became popular with Steelers fans, inspiring a fan club, "Gerela's Gorillas." He led the AFC in scoring in 1973 and 1974, and was named to the Pro Bowl in 1972 and 1974. When he retired, he had the record for most missed extra points in postseason history (6) until Jake Elliott matched him in 2026.

Gerela was a member of the Steelers' Super Bowl championship teams in 1974, 1975, and 1978, but was released before the 1979 season in favor of rookie Matt Bahr. He appeared in three games for the San Diego Chargers in 1979 before a torn groin muscle ended his career.

Gerela ranks fourth on the Steelers' all-time scoring list, behind Gary Anderson, Jeff Reed, and Chris Boswell.

Since his playing career ended, Gerela has worked as both a high school and college assistant football coach. In 2012, he became the head football coach of Gadsden High School in Anthony, New Mexico.

Gerela came from a particularly gifted family. His brothers were also professional kickers in the Canadian Football League; Ted Gerela with the BC Lions and Metro Gerela briefly with the Montreal Alouettes (Metro is enshrined in the Canadian Soccer Hall of Fame.) In 1993, his son Ted Gerela was selected in the seventh round of the 1993 CFL draft by the BC Lions as a linebacker from Rocky Mountain College.

== Sources ==
- Kaneshiro, Jason (October 14, 2005). "Kalani graduate Gerela giving back with the Aggies". Honolulu Star-Bulletin.
- Yodice, James (November 4, 2012). "Oh, What a Tangled Web Atop Class 5A Prep Football". Albuquerque Journal.
