= Henry Davis (American football) =

American football player (1942–2000)

No. 66, 53
- Position: Linebacker

Personal information
- Born: November 8, 1942; Slaughter, Louisiana, U.S.
- Died: June 11, 2000 (aged 57); Baton Rouge, Louisiana, U.S.
- Listed height: 6 ft 3 in (1.91 m)
- Listed weight: 235 lb (107 kg)

Career information
- High school: Clinton (Clinton, Louisiana)
- College: Grambling State (1964-1967)
- NFL draft: 1968: 11th round, 288th overall pick

Career history
- New York Giants (1968–1969); Pittsburgh Steelers (1970–1973)

Awards and highlights
- Super Bowl champion (IX); Pro Bowl (1972)

Career NFL statistics
- Interceptions: 4
- INT yards: 55
- Fumble recoveries: 2
- Stats at Pro Football Reference

Henry Louis Davis (November 8, 1942 – June 11, 2000) was an American professional football player. He played as a linebacker in the National Football League (NFL). He was selected by the New York Giants in the 11th round of the 1968 NFL/AFL draft. He played college football at Grambling State. Davis was a Pro Bowl selection with the Pittsburgh Steelers for the 1972 season.
