= Andy Hopkins =

American gridiron football player (1949–2017)

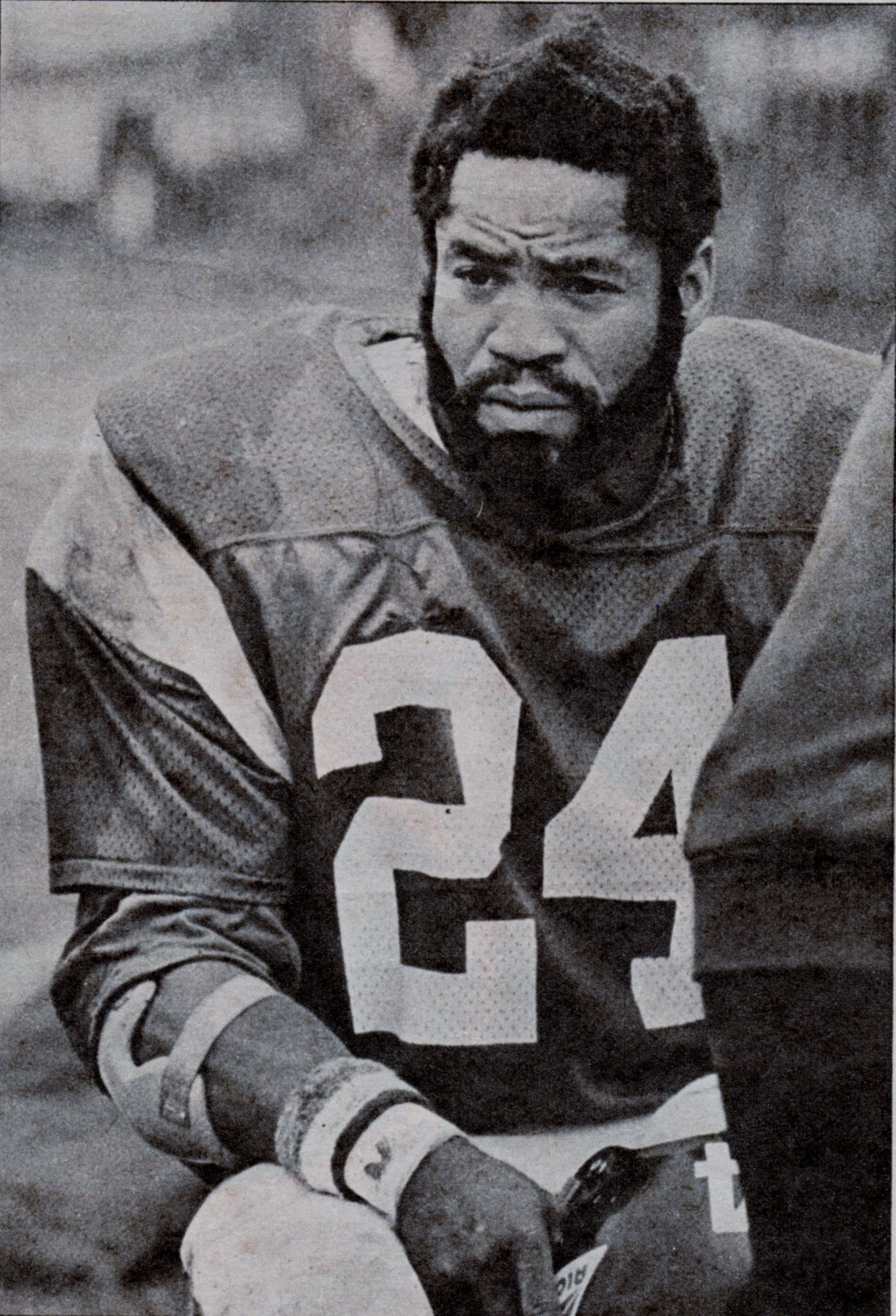

Profile
- Position: Running back

Personal information
- Born: October 19, 1949; Crockett, Texas, U.S.
- Died: October 1, 2017 (aged 67); Sugar Land, Texas, U.S.
- Listed height: 5 ft 10 in (1.78 m)
- Listed weight: 186 lb (84 kg)

Career information
- College: Stephen F. Austin State
- NFL draft: 1971: 15th round, 368th overall pick

Career history
- 1971–1973: Houston Oilers
- 1973–1975: Hamilton Tiger-Cats
- 1976–1977: Montreal Alouettes

Awards and highlights
- Grey Cup cphampion (1977); 3× CFL East All-Star (1973, 1974, 1976)
- Stats at Pro Football Reference

Andrew P. Hopkins Sr. was an all-star Canadian Football League (CFL) running back. Andrew "Shay" Hopkins, a native of Crockett, Texas attended Ralph Bunche High School. He was a member of the High School Choir, Ralph Bunche Gazette, Year-book Staff and sports editor of the Ralph Bunche Year-book. Andy showed extraordinary athletic abilities in high school. He was a stand-out star in track, baseball, and football. Hopkins didn't make the football team: he was cut as a ninth-grader under the coaching of his father, Andrew J. Hopkins. Hopkins used this incident as a determining factor to try harder. He later became captain of his high school football team.

== The making of a superstar ==
After graduating from high school, Hopkins signed a "Letter of Intent" to attend Stephen F. Austin State University in Nacogdoches, Texas. He was drafted into the National Football League (NFL) by the Houston Oilers in 1971. He later finished his professional football career in the CFL in Canada; playing for both the Hamilton Ti-Cats and Montreal Alouettes Professional Football Teams.

After playing college football at Stephen F. Austin State University he joined the Hamilton Tiger-Cats in 1973, where he rushed for (a team record at the time) 1223 yards in his rookie season. Joining the Montreal Alouettes in 1976, he again rushed for over one thousand yards (1075 and an all-star selection), and in 1977 he was part of their Grey Cup championship team.

== Personal life ==
Hopkins was married to his high school sweetheart, Ann Hopkins (Public Education Administrator); and they are the parents of four children: Dr. Alicia Hopkins; Andrew Hopkins II; Aaric Hopkins, B. Sc./Master Degree in Criminal Justice/Law Enforcement; and Ashton Hopkins, Mechanical Engineer.

The Hopkins family lives in Missouri City, Texas, and attends Brentwood Baptist Church (Houston, Texas). Hopkins was CEO of his own company, Copier Systems. Inc.

== NFL achievements ==
All-time East Texans in NFL draft: Hopkins, Andy RB NFL draft 1971 round 15 #368

== CFL achievements ==
Andy Hopkins was a three-time Eastern All-Star and twice cracked the 1,000-yard mark in rushing in his five-year CFL career. Hopkins broke into the CFL with Hamilton in 1973 and led the East in rushing with 1223 yards to get his first East All-Star honor. In 1974, Hopkins fell just short of the 1,000-yard club as his average carry took a plunge from 5.5 down to 4.1 but his 943 yards and 42 receptions earned him his second Eastern All-Star award. Injuries limited Hopkins to just 463 yards in 8 games in 1975. Hopkins joined the Montreal Alouettes in 1976 and bounced back for his second 1,000 yards season with 1075 yards and a career high 43 pass receptions to capture his third Eastern All-Star award. In 1975, Hopkins appeared in only 5 games and had 218 yards rushing. Hopkins finished his career with 3922 yards rushing.

== Gallery ==
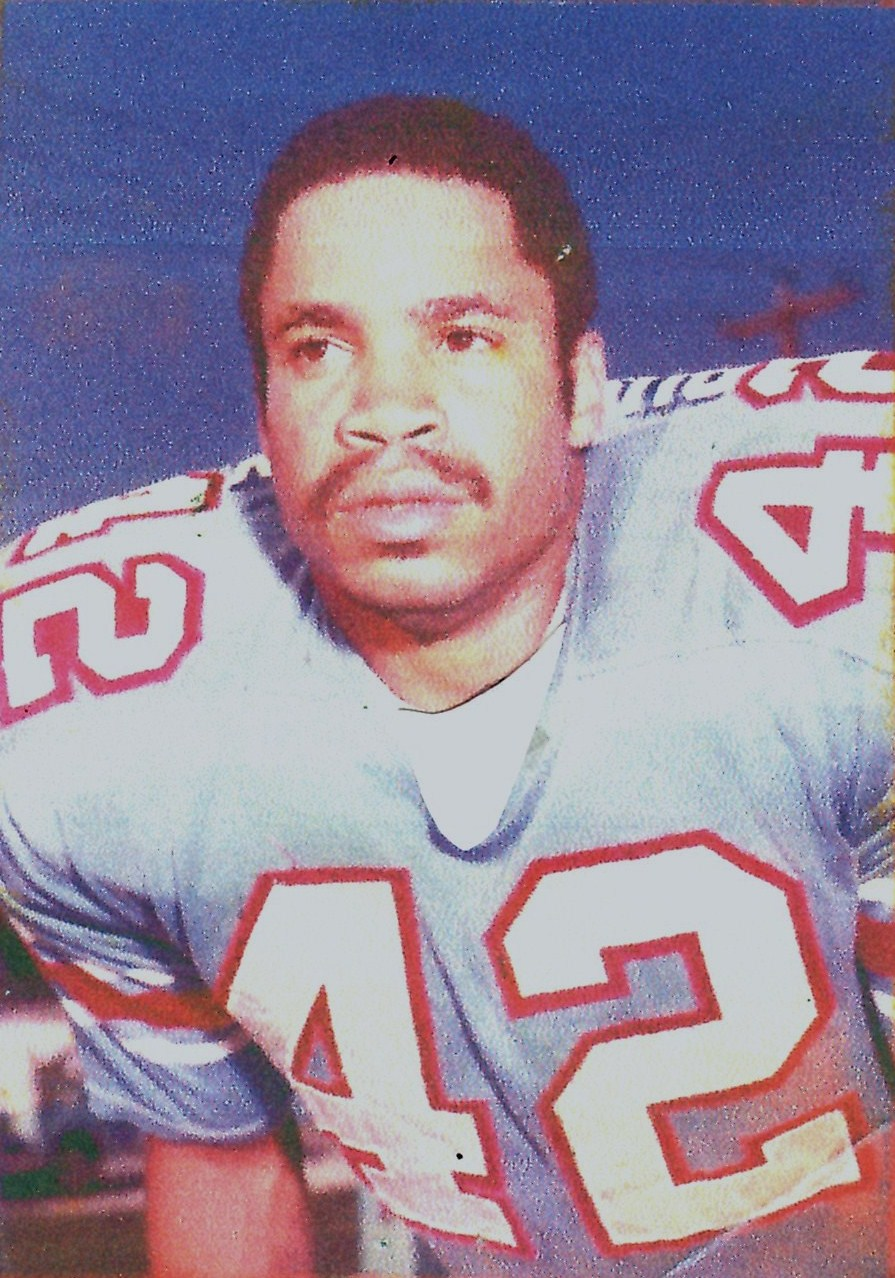
Andy Hopkins, Houston Oilers 1971

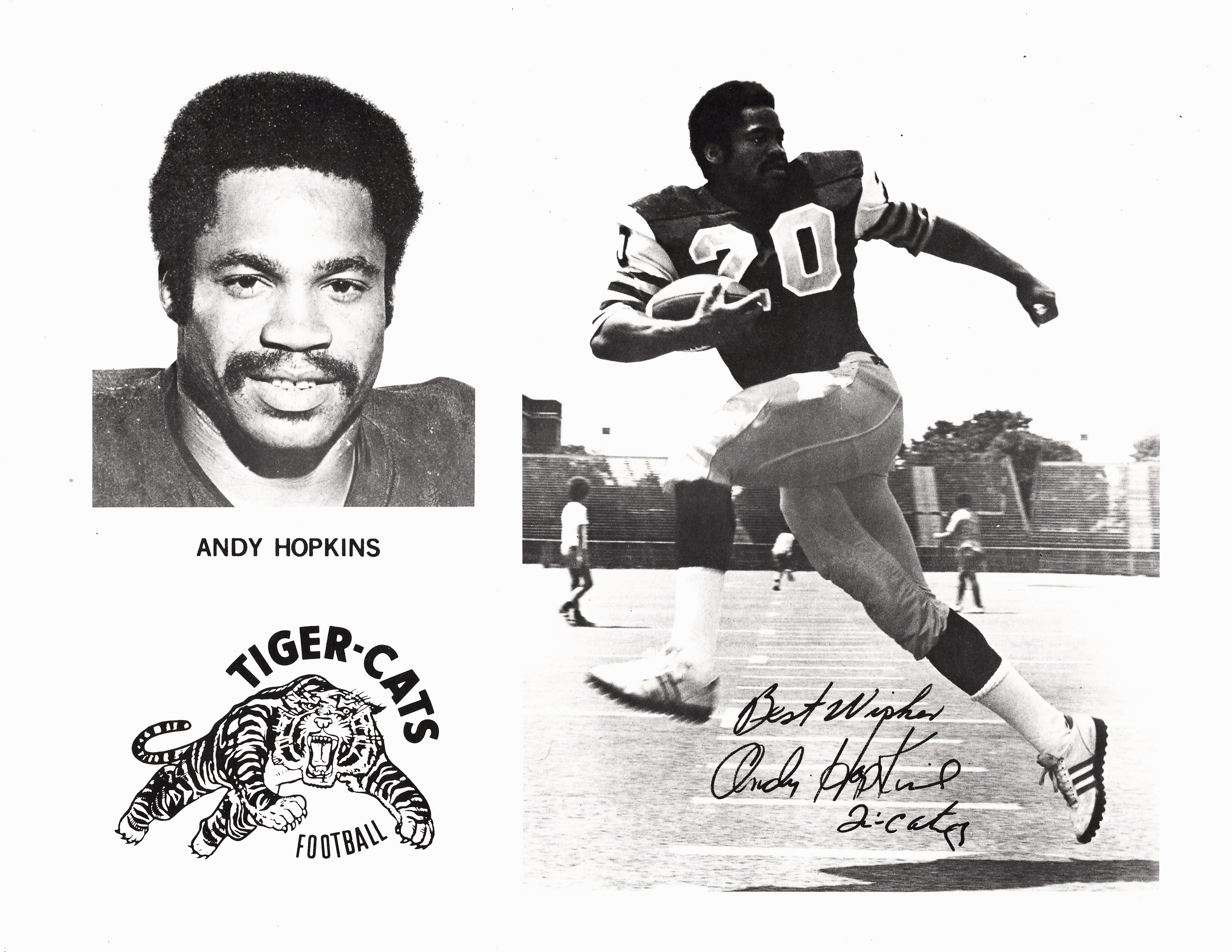
Andy Hopkins

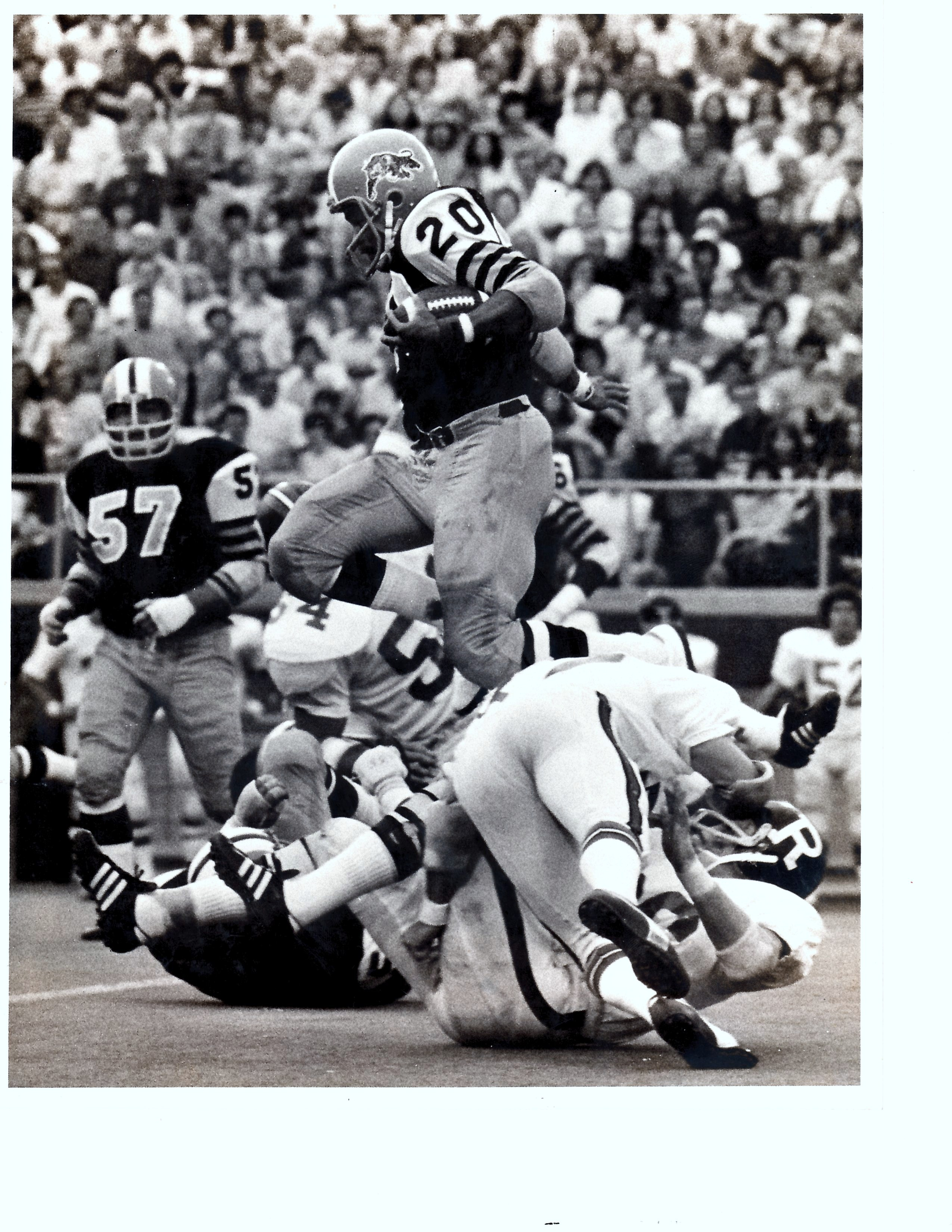
Andy Hopkins, Canadian Football League 1976

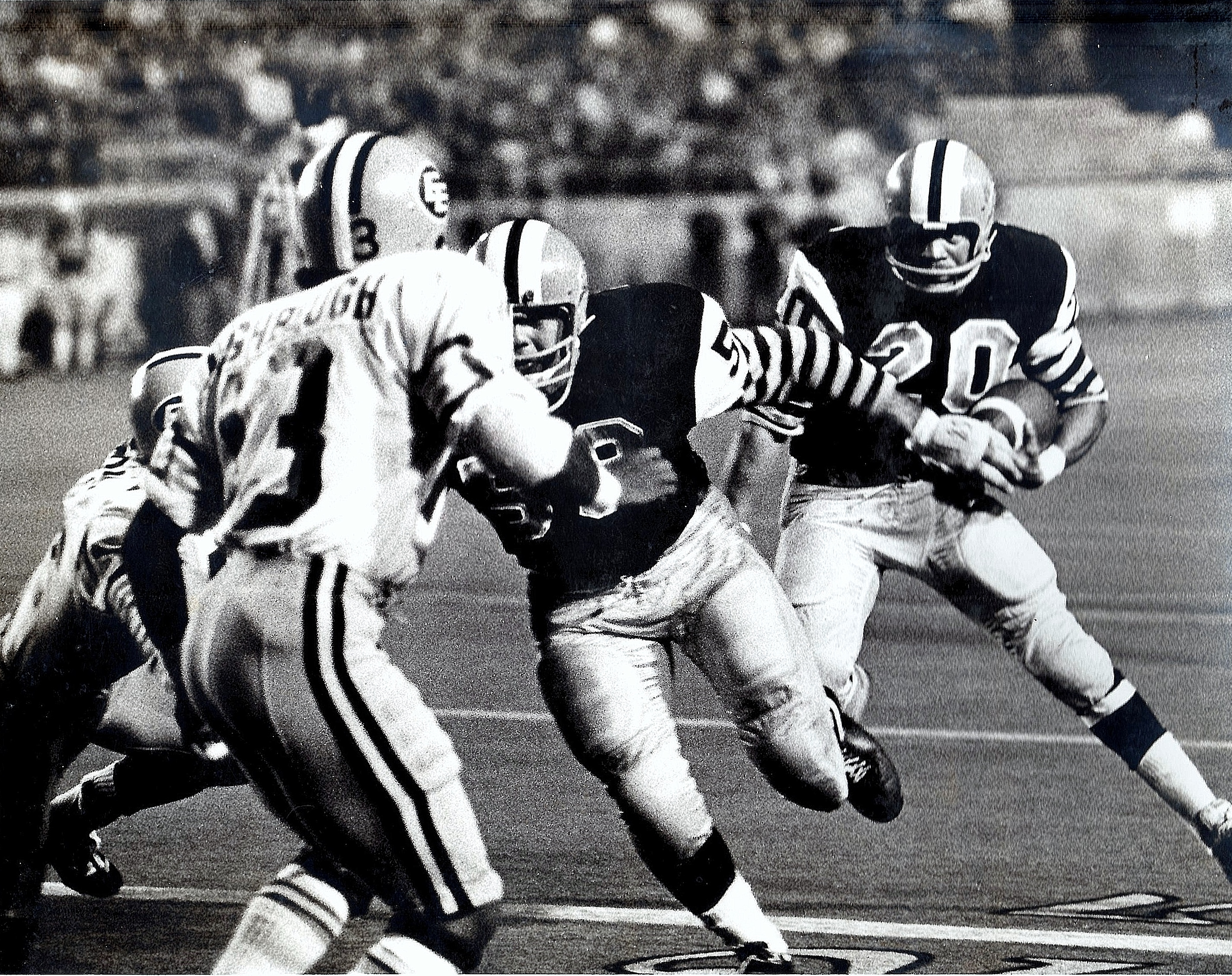
Andy Shay Hopkins

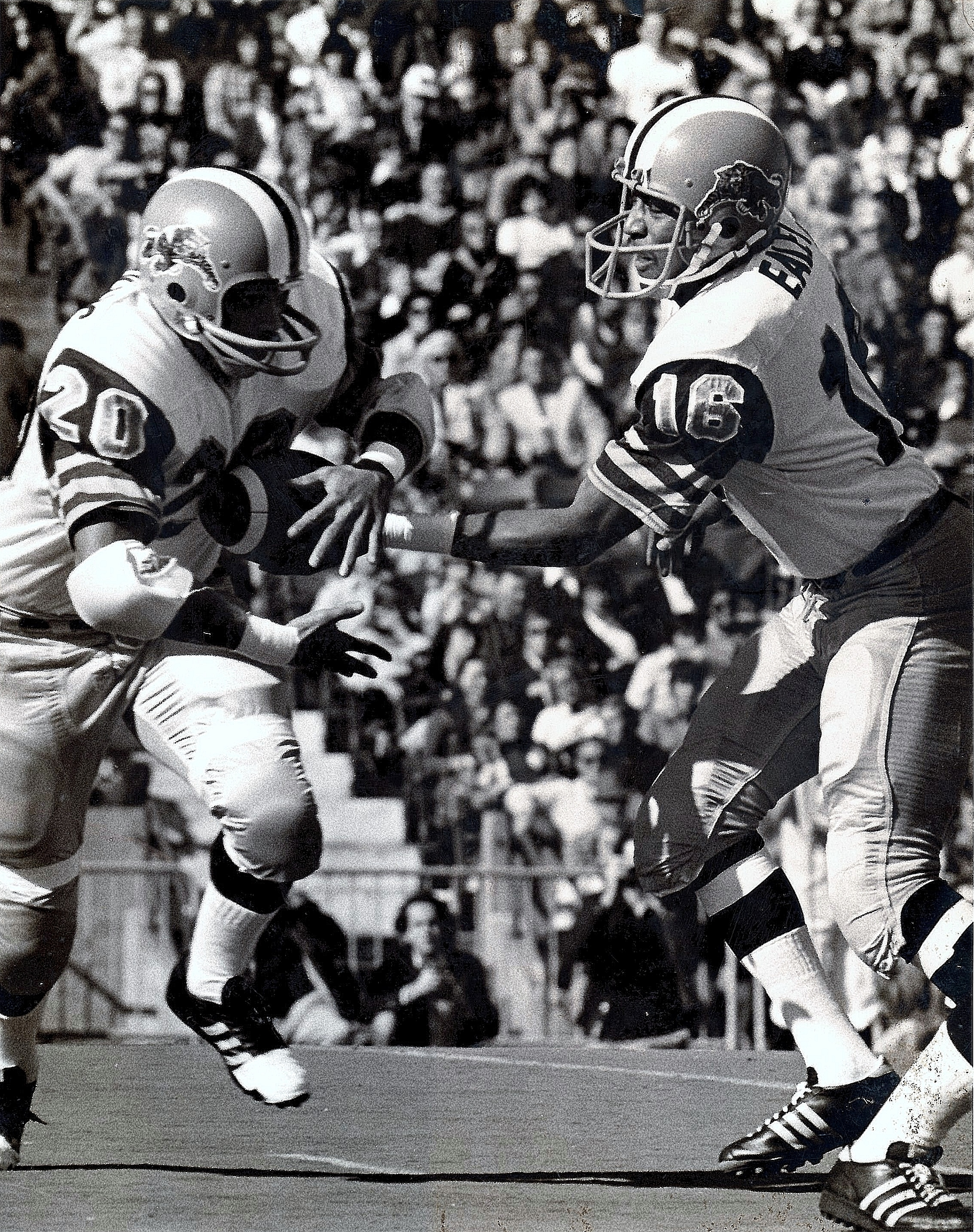
Andy Hopkins

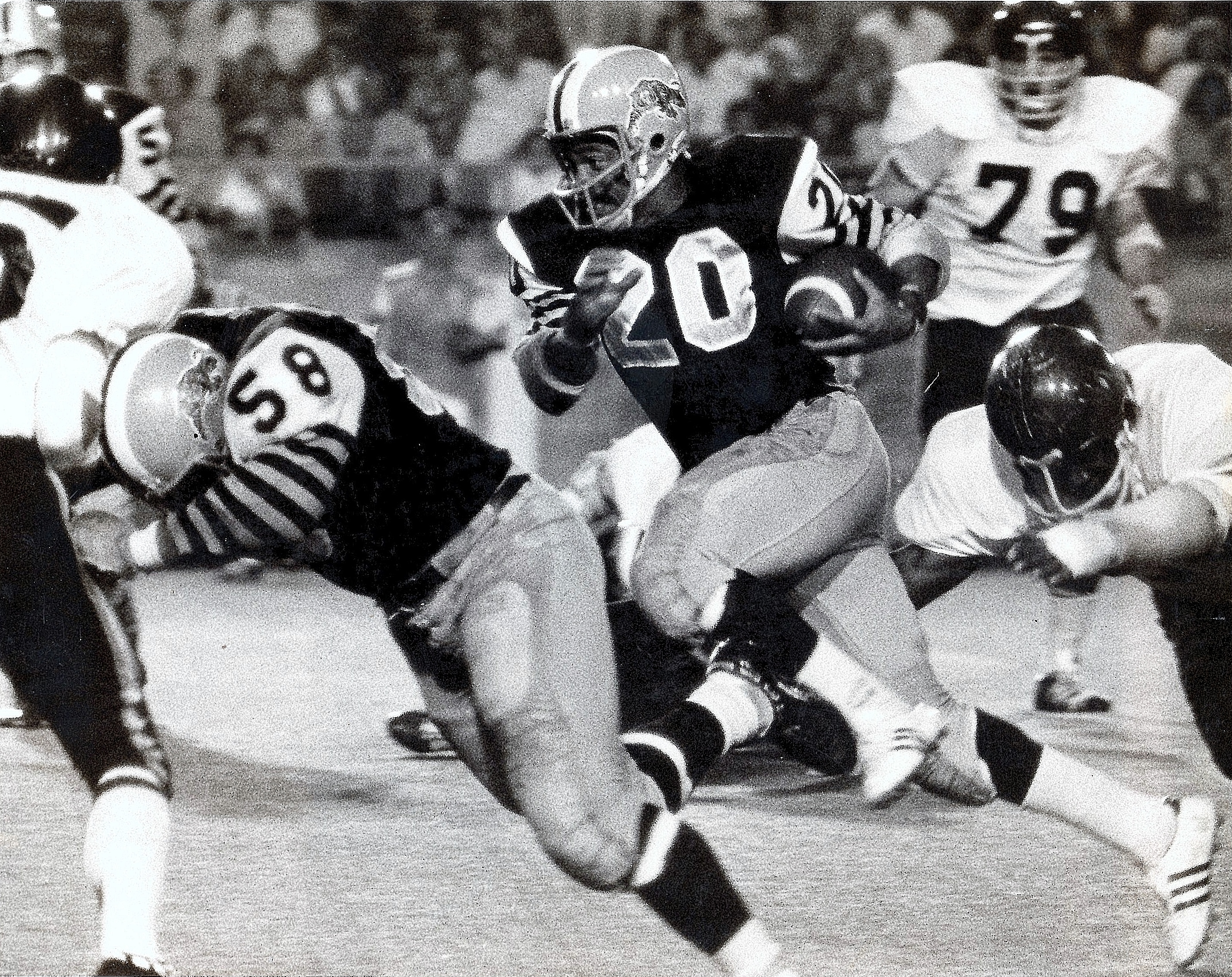
Andy Hopkins

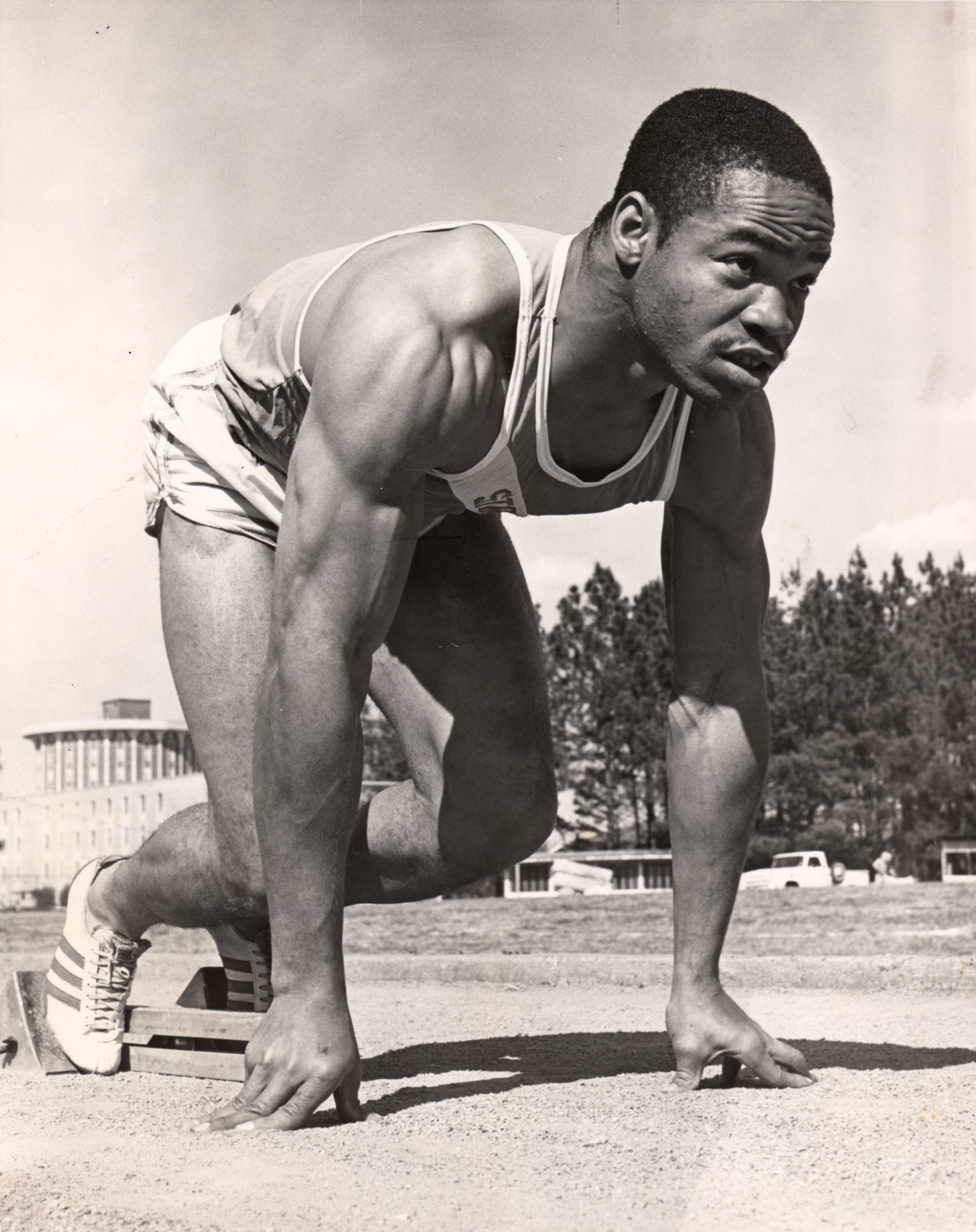
Andy Hopkins N.F.L, C.F.L, Professional Track and Field

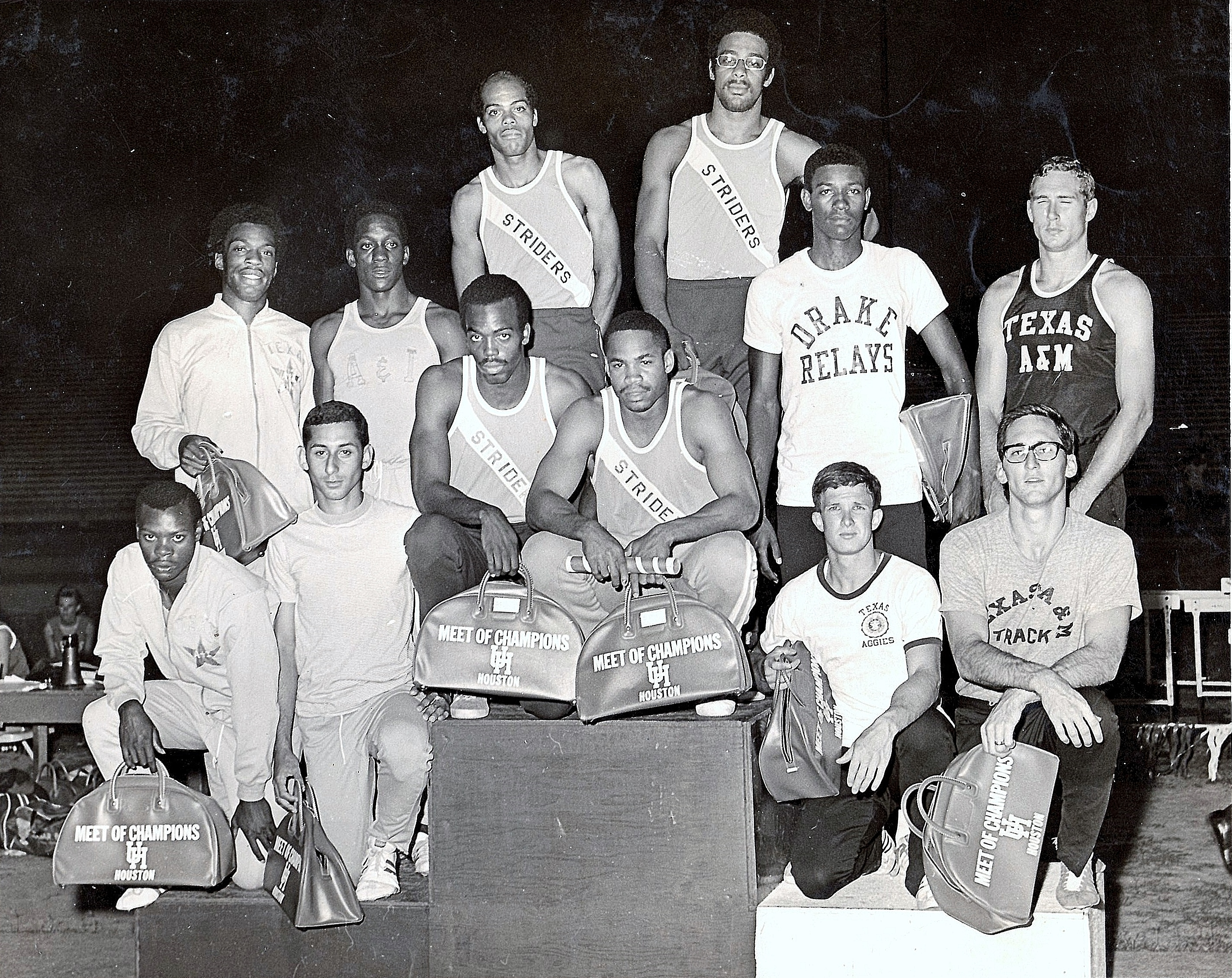
Andy Hopkins

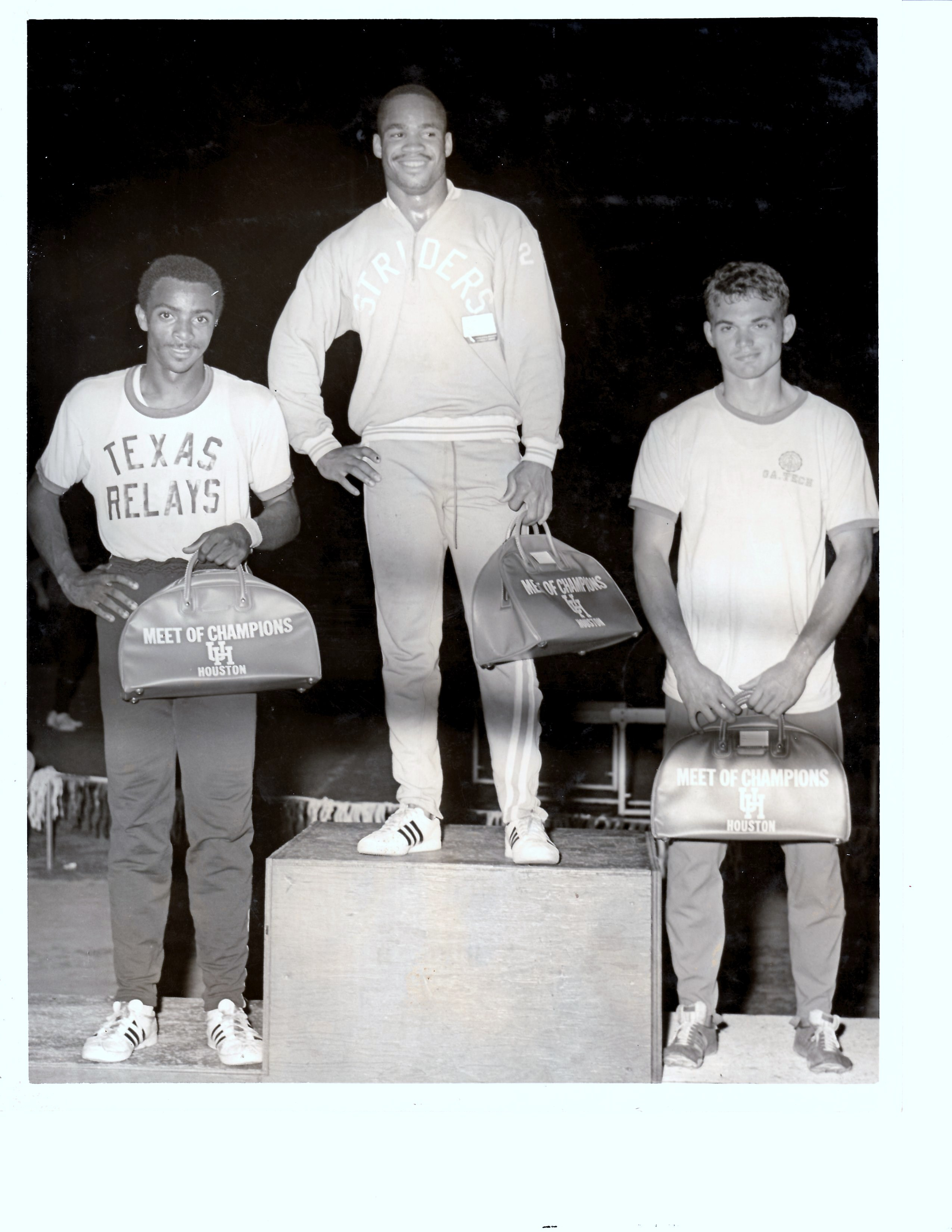
Andy Hopkins
