= Glen Holloway =

American football player (1946–2011)

No. 61, 62
- Position: Guard

Personal information
- Born: September 16, 1948; Corpus Christi, Texas, U.S.
- Died: December 20, 2011 (aged 63)
- Listed height: 6 ft 3 in (1.91 m)
- Listed weight: 250 lb (113 kg)

Career information
- High school: Roy Miller (TX)
- College: North Texas
- NFL draft: 1970: 10th round, 235th overall pick

Career history
- Chicago Bears (1970–1973); Cleveland Browns (1974)

Career NFL statistics
- Games: 70
- Stats at Pro Football Reference

Glen Leroy Holloway (September 16, 1948 – December 20, 2011) was an American professional football guard in the National Football League (NFL). He played for the Chicago Bears and Cleveland Browns. He played college football for the North Texas Mean Green.
