= Melvin Holmes =

American football player (1950–2015)

Mel Holmes
No. 77
- Positions: Guard, tackle

Personal information
- Born: January 22, 1950; Miami, Florida, U.S.
- Died: December 24, 2015 (aged 65); Hemingway, South Carolina, U.S.
- Listed height: 6 ft 3 in (1.91 m)
- Listed weight: 251 lb (114 kg)

Career information
- High school: Mays
- College: North Carolina A&T
- NFL draft: 1971: 5th round, 122nd overall pick

Career history
- Pittsburgh Steelers (1971–1973)
- Stats at Pro Football Reference

Melvin Holmes (January 22, 1950 – December 24, 2015) was an American professional football player with the Pittsburgh Steelers from 1971 to 1973. He is the father of Detroit Lions general manager Brad Holmes.

== Early life ==
Holmes was born in Miami, Florida. He played high school football at Mays High School in Miami, and college football at North Carolina A&T State University.

== Career ==
He was selected 122nd overall in the fifth round of the 1971 NFL Draft by the Pittsburgh Steelers.
