= Metro Gerela =

Canadian soccer player, coach (b. 1941)

Dmetro (Metro) Gerela
Profile
- Position: Kicker

Personal information
- Born: April 22, 1941 (age 85); Sarrail, Alberta, Canada

Career information
- College: none

Career history
- 1968: Montreal Alouettes

Metro Gerela is a Canadian soccer coach and former professional soccer player.

In 1953, during the first Vancouver Sun Tournament of Champions (Youth Provincial Cup Competition Finals) played in Callister Park, Gerela (Powell River) was chosen to be the first "Sun Soccer Boy".

On October 17, 1964, Gerela led the New Westminster Royals to a 5–1 victory over the UBC Thunderbirds with two goals.

Gerela was head coach of the Capilano College Blues women's soccer team from 1992 to 1994. He held the position of technical director at the Wesburn youth soccer club in 2004. He was the coach of the Croatia Sports Club soccer team in the Vancouver Metro Soccer League's Premier division.

He is married to Silvana Burtini, a police officer and formerly with the WUSA's Carolina Courage and a past member of Canada women's national soccer team.

He was a member of the 1979 Vancouver Whitecaps, who in 2011 were recognized as a Canada Soccer Hall of Fame Team of Distinction. Gerela was the head scout.

Gerela played two games (as a punter) for the Montreal Alouettes of the Canadian Football League in 1968.

His two brothers were also football placekickers: Ted Gerela played with the British Columbia Lions and Roy Gerela with the Pittsburgh Steelers in the NFL.
