= Kent Gaydos =

American football player (born 1949)

No. 86
- Positions: Wide receiver, tight end

Personal information
- Born: September 8, 1949 (age 77); South Bend, Indiana, U.S.
- Listed height: 6 ft 6 in (1.98 m)
- Listed weight: 225 lb (102 kg)

Career information
- High school: Winter Park (Winter Park, Florida)
- College: Florida State (1968–1971)
- NFL draft: 1972: 12th round, 306th overall pick

Career history
- Oakland Raiders (1972–1975)*; Philadelphia Eagles (1975)*; Green Bay Packers (1975); Tampa Bay Buccaneers (1976)*
- * Offseason or practice squad member only

Career NFL statistics
- Games played: 4
- Stats at Pro Football Reference

Kent Gaydos (born September 8, 1949) is an American former professional football player who was a wide receiver and tight end in the National Football League (NFL). He played college football for the Florida State Seminoles and later had stints in the NFL with the Oakland Raiders, Philadelphia Eagles, Green Bay Packers and Tampa Bay Buccaneers.

== Early life ==
Gaydos was born on September 8, 1949, in South Bend, Indiana, but grew up in Dallas, Texas. He attended Winter Park High School in Florida, being one of only six of their alumni to ever make it to the NFL. He played football and basketball for the school.

Although a talented wide receiver, he was forced to play quarterback as the team had no one else who could play the position. He was described in The Orlando Sentinel as a "fine-running, strong-armed quarterback who could throw the ball a mile"; however, it was noted that there were few other good players on the Winter Park football team at the time and thus they went 3–7 in Gaydos' junior year and 3–6–1 when he was a senior.

In basketball, Gaydos earned all-conference, all-state and all-area honors while receiving numerous athletic scholarship offers to play the sport in college. He only received one offer, however, in football, to play for the Florida State Seminoles. He accepted the offer, saying he liked football better than basketball. He was inducted into the Metro Conference Hall of Fame in 1981.

== College career ==
Gaydos was changed to being a wide receiver when he joined the Seminoles. After not lettering in his first year at Florida State, 1968, due to then-current NCAA rules that barred freshmen from varsity sports, he became a starter on the varsity team as a sophomore in 1969 and totaled 449 receiving yards on 37 receptions with three touchdowns. 13 of his receptions that year came in a single game against Houston. In 1970, he appeared in 11 games and recorded 18 catches for 292 yards and two scores. He trained with the Dallas Cowboys prior to the 1971 season, being invited by Reggie Rucker who lived near Gaydos' parents.

As a senior in 1971, Gaydos played in 11 games but had only 18 catches while alternating at receiver with Barry Smith, whom he would later be teammates with in the NFL. However, of his 18 catches, seven went for touchdowns and he averaged 21.3 yards-per-catch; his touchdowns total ranked fifth-best in team history as of 1981. He finished his collegiate career having compiled 1,124 receiving yards (Note: Stated as 1,125 in some sources.) on 73 catches while scoring 12 touchdowns in 32 games played.

== Professional career ==
Gaydos was selected in the 12th round (306th overall) of the 1972 NFL draft by the Oakland Raiders. He spent the season on the taxi squad while playing tight end, appearing in no games in his rookie year. He was expected to be the second-string tight end in 1973 but switched to wide receiver and was a member of the taxi squad for the season. The following year, he was one of the players involved in the 1974 NFL strike, although he later returned to the team. Gaydos made another position switch that season, again becoming a tight end. He was placed on injured reserve in September 1974 after having suffered a broken wrist. Prior to the 1975 season, he made another switch to wide receiver.

Gaydos was traded to the Philadelphia Eagles in September 1975, having not played a single game in his three-year stay with the team. After his first practice with the Eagles, head coach Mike McCormack released him. The month after his stint with the Eagles, Gaydos was signed by the Green Bay Packers. He appeared in four games for the team, none as a starter, before being put on injured reserve in November. He was waived by the Packers in July 1976 but was quickly claimed off waivers by the Tampa Bay Buccaneers. He was injured in training camp and placed on injured reserve, after which he retired.

== Later and personal life ==
Gaydos was married to Pamela Hope Peppers in February 1973. After his football career, he worked as a land developer in Mansfield, Texas.
