= Dan Medlin =

American football player (born 1949)

No. 79, 68
- Position: Guard

Personal information
- Born: October 12, 1949 (age 77); High Point, North Carolina, U.S.
- Listed height: 6 ft 3 in (1.91 m)
- Listed weight: 260 lb (118 kg)

Career information
- College: NC State
- NFL draft: 1972: 6th round, 131st overall pick

Career history
- Oakland Raiders (1974–1976); Tampa Bay Buccaneers (1977–1978); Oakland Raiders (1979)

Awards and highlights
- Super Bowl champion (XI)

Career NFL statistics
- Games played: 76
- Games started: 26
- Stats at Pro Football Reference

Daniel Ellis Medlin (born October 12, 1949) is an American former professional football player who was a guard in the National Football League (NFL). He played college football for the NC State Wolfpack. Medlin played in the NFL for the Oakland Raiders between 1974 and 1976 and again in 1979. He also played for the Tampa Bay Buccaneers between 1977 and 1978. He played 76 games in 6 seasons in the NFL. He was a member of the 1976 Super Bowl champion Oakland Raiders.
