= Ron Curl =

American football player (1949–2025)

No. 94
- Positions: Defensive lineman, offensive lineman

Personal information
- Born: July 6, 1949; Chicago, Illinois, U.S.
- Died: April 29, 2025 (aged 75)
- Listed height: 6 ft 2 in (1.88 m)
- Listed weight: 250 lb (113 kg)

Career information
- College: Michigan State
- NFL draft: 1972: 12th round, 298th overall pick

Career history
- Toronto Argonauts (CFL), Birmingham Americans (WFL), Chicago Winds (WFL)

Ronald C. Curl (July 6, 1949 – April 29, 2025) was an American professional football player offensive lineman for the Toronto Argonauts in the Canadian Football League (CFL) and defensive lineman in the World Football League (WFL).

== College career ==
Curl was an All-American defensive tackle at Michigan State University. He was a two-time All-Big 10 selection (1969 and 1971). As a junior in 1969, Curl blocked four punts and an extra point. He missed the 1970 season with a broken arm. As a senior captain in 1971, Curl had a 10-tackle game against No. 10 Ohio State, ending the Buckeye's 16-game Big 10 winning streak. That same season he won Michigan State's Biggie Munn Award as the team's most inspirational player. Curl finished his career at Michigan State with 204 tackles and 25 tackles for loss, making him at the time the all-time Spartans leader in both categories. Following the season, Curl played in the East-West Shrine Game, Coaches' All-American Game, and Hula Bowl.

== Professional career ==
Curl was selected in the 12th round of the 1972 NFL draft by the Pittsburgh Steelers, but failed to make the team. He played two seasons (1973 and 1974) as an offensive guard for the CFL's Toronto Argonauts and then two seasons back on defense in the WFL for the Birmingham Americans and Chicago Winds.

== Personal life and death ==
Following his football career, Curl worked at Rouge Steel, working his way up to foreman.

Curl died on April 29, 2025, at the age of 75.
