= Phil Price (Canadian football) =

American gridiron football player (born 1949)

Profile
- Position: Defensive back

Personal information
- Born: September 1, 1949 (age 77); Providence, Rhode Island, U.S.
- Listed height: 6 ft 1 in (1.85 m)
- Listed weight: 195 lb (88 kg)

Career information
- High school: Central (RI)
- College: Idaho State
- NFL draft: 1972: 10th round, 254th overall pick

Career history
- 1973–1976: Montreal Alouettes
- 1977: Saskatchewan Roughriders
- 1977: Edmonton Eskimos

Awards and highlights
- Grey Cup champion (1974)

Phillip Clinton Price (born September 1, 1949) is an American former professional football player who played for the Montreal Alouettes, Saskatchewan Roughriders, and Edmonton Eskimos of the Canadian Football League (CFL). He played college football at Idaho State University.
