= Ted Gerela =

Canadian gridiron football player (1944–2020)

Profile
- Position: Kicker

Personal information
- Born: March 12, 1944; Sarrail, Alberta, Canada
- Died: July 16, 2020 (aged 76); Chilliwack, British Columbia, Canada

Career information
- College: Washington State University

Career history
- 1967–1973: British Columbia Lions

Awards and highlights
- Dr. Beattie Martin Trophy (1967); Dave Dryburgh Memorial Trophy (1968)

Theodore Gerela (March 12, 1944 – July 16, 2020) was a kicker in the Canadian Football League (CFL).

== Life ==
Gerela, a graduate of Washington State University, joined the British Columbia Lions in 1967 and played with them for 7 seasons. Though he was a versatile player (rushing 16 times, catching 13 passes, and making 2 interceptions, as well as punting one season), he was unique in that he was primarily a kicking specialist. Previously, most kickers played another primary position. While not accurate by later standards (he only made 123 of 271 field goal attempts), he had a strong leg and regularly made field goals of 50-plus yards. He won the Dr. Beattie Martin Trophy as the best rookie in the Western Conference in 1967.

Most notably, in 1968, he hit 30 field goals, which was a record for any professional league. He also won the conference scoring title, ushering in the era of the kicking specialist. All-Star selections were not made for kickers during his career. As of 2011, his 570 points were still the 3rd highest in the Lions' history.

Gerela came from a particularly gifted family. His brothers were also professional kickers; Roy Gerela with the Super Bowl champion Pittsburgh Steelers and Metro Gerela briefly with the Montreal Alouettes (Metro is enshrined in the Canadian Soccer Hall of Fame.) In 1993, his son, Ted Gerela, was drafted in the 7th round of the 1993 CFL draft by the BC Lions as a linebacker from Rocky Mountain College.

Gerala died on July 16, 2020, from cancer.
