= 1970 Pittsburgh Steelers season =

NFL sports season

- Owner: Art Rooney
- Head coach: Chuck Noll
- Home stadium: Three Rivers Stadium

Results
- Record: 5–9
- Division place: 3rd AFC Central
- Playoffs: Did not qualify
- All-Pros: None
- Pro Bowlers: 2: DT Joe Greene; LB Andy Russell
- Team MVP: Joe Greene

The 1970 Pittsburgh Steelers season was the franchise's 38th in the National Football League. They improved from a league-worst 1–13 record the previous year, finishing with a 5–9 record and third place in the newly formed AFC Central. The Steelers began the decade in a new conference and a new stadium with a new quarterback. After nearly 40 years in the NFL they shifted to the AFC, to complete the merger between the NFL and AFL. It was the NFL’s weakest division that season, as the Steelers finished three games behind the first place Cincinnati Bengals — a team that was only in its third year of existence.

== Offseason ==
Coach Chuck Noll's reshaping of the squad from the previous season continued for 1970.

Undoubtedly the greatest change that took place was Chuck Noll's trade of the team's lone superstar, Roy Jefferson. Although Jefferson was among the league leaders in receiving in 1968 and 1969, despite playing with mediocre quarterbacks for the worst team in football, he was sent packing after being publicly vocal in criticizing team management. The trade sent Jefferson to Baltimore, where he earned a Super Bowl ring. Years later, Jefferson pinpointed what he had done to get traded.

"I was [in Baltimore] to make a statement. I wanted to show Pittsburgh they'd made a mistake in getting rid of me. I mean, I wasn't a “yes” man for coach Chuck Noll. If you cursed me, I cursed you back. I messed over the curfew rules a lot and, in training camp, I'd park my car in the coaches' spaces."

Hence, 1970 brought change with Ron Shanklin emerging as a steady receiver for the next few years until John Stallworth and Lynn Swann joined the team in 1974.

As a result of the NFL-AFL merger being finalized for the 1970 season, three teams from the "old" NFL were moved to the newly formed AFC alongside the former AFL teams. The Steelers agreed to be one of them after their archrivals, the Cleveland Browns, volunteered to join the AFL franchises in the AFC. The Browns mainly joined because of the possibility of an intrastate rivalry with the AFL's Cincinnati Bengals (now known as the Battle of Ohio), largely due to the animosity at the time between Browns owner Art Modell and Bengals owner and coach Paul Brown, who was fired from the Browns by Modell after the 1962 season. The Steelers joined the AFC in order to keep the Browns-Steelers rivalry alive on a regular basis, due to the proximity of the cities of Pittsburgh and Cleveland.

=== Draft ===
Another change came in the draft. For the first time since 1956, the Steelers owned the number one selection in the draft after winning a coin toss with the Chicago Bears for the top pick, as the two teams had identical 1–13 records in 1969. (The Steelers would have won the tiebreaker under the modern NFL tiebreaker rules anyway, since the Bears' one win was against the Steelers in week 8 of that season.)

1970 Pittsburgh Steelers draft
Round	Pick	Player	Position	College	Notes
1	1	Terry Bradshaw * ^{†}	Quarterback	Louisiana Tech	
2	28	Ron Shanklin *	Wide receiver	North Texas	
3	53	Mel Blount * ^{†}	Cornerback	Southern	
4	80	Ed George	Tackle	Wake Forest	
5	105	Jon Staggers	Defensive back	Missouri	
6	132	Manuel Barrera	Linebacker	Kansas State	
6	155	Clarence Kegler	Tackle	South Carolina State	
7	157	Terry Brennan	Tackle	Notre Dame	
8	184	Dave Smith	Wide receiver	Indiana (Pa.)	
9	209	Carl Crennel	Linebacker	West Virginia	
10	236	Isaiah Brown	Defensive back	Stanford	
11	261	Calvin Hunt	Center	Baylor	
12	288	Rick Sharp	Defensive tackle	Washington	
13	313	Billy Main	Running back	Oregon State	
14	340	Bert Askson	Linebacker	Texas Southern	
15	365	Glen Keppy	Defensive tackle	Wisconsin–Platteville	
16	392	Frank Yanossy	Defensive tackle	Tennessee	
17	417	Harry Key	Tight end	Mississippi Valley State	
Made roster † Pro Football Hall of Fame * Made at least one Pro Bowl during career

=== Undrafted free agents ===
1970 undrafted free agents of note
Player	Position	College
Jim Bagby	Defensive end	Prairie View A&M
Dennis Born	Guard	USC
Ken Crots	Kicker	Toledo
Steve Edwards	Running back	West Virginia
Ira Glass	Wide receiver	Louisville
Dennis Hughes	Tight end	Georgia
Dave Kalina	Wide receiver	Miami (FL)
Bob Leahy	Quarterback	Emporia State
Jack Rust	Guard	Oregon
Terry Smoot	Running back	Virginia Tech
Dewey Stendahl	Wide receiver	Wisconsin–La Crosse

In the 1970 NFL Draft, only two Hall of Famers were selected in all seventeen Rounds and 442 Picks. These were 1st Round, 1st Pick selection Terry Bradshaw, and 3rd Round, 53rd Pick Mel Blount. Both were part of the 1970s Steeler Dynasty, and both inducted into the Hall of Fame in 1989. In his 14-year professional career, Bradshaw got off on a bumpy start from 1970 to 1975, and threw a career-high 24 interceptions and only 6 touchdown passes in 1970. In wasn't until 1976 that Bradshaw's career began to peak. Blount's career was an overall consistent one. In 1975, he intercepted 11 passes for 121 yards.

In 1966, the NFL agreed on a merger with the rival AFL (American Football League). In 1970, the merger became final, as a result of the merger, the AFC (American Football Conference) featuring all the AFL teams and the NFC (National Football Conference) featuring all the "old" NFL teams. Two teams from the NFL were asked to join the AFL in the AFC, the Baltimore Colts, and the Cleveland Browns (the Browns owner, Art Modell asked the NFL Commissioner, Pete Rozelle if he could join to play the Cincinnati Bengals in the Battle of Ohio). Upon hearing this, Art Rooney (Steelers Owner) asked Rozelle if he could join to keep the Steelers-Browns rivalry alive. So, the Steelers would begin playing in the AFC and would leave the Eagles rivalry and many others they had had playing the NFC teams. Also, the Steelers moved into the then state-of-the-art, Three Rivers Stadium and left Pitt Stadium. The new Three Rivers was one of the many "cookie-cutter" stadiums across the league and became an icon to Pittsburgh.

The opening of Three Rivers ended their relatively brief stay at Pitt Stadium, where they had only been playing on a full-time basis for six years. Before that, the Steelers played most of their home games at Forbes Field, with occasional games being played at Pitt Stadium to take advantage of the larger capacity. The Steelers later returned the favor to the University of Pittsburgh in 2000 when the Pitt Panthers football team moved into Three Rivers for one season as an interim home before Heinz Field was ready in 2001. Pitt would also play their Backyard Brawl games against West Virginia in years Pitt hosted the game during the existence of Three Rivers.

WTAE-TV sportscaster Myron Cope joined the Steelers radio network as color commentator for the 1970 season. Cope remained a fixture of the Steelers radio network through the 2004 season and became beloved by fans due to his enthusiasm and catchphrases behind the announcing booth. In 1975, Cope invented the Terrible Towel, originally conceived as a gimmick in the Steelers playoff game against Baltimore and now a staple among Steelers fans.

== Personnel ==
=== Staff / Coaches ===
1970 Pittsburgh Steelers staff
Front office: President – Arthur J. Rooney; Vice president – John R. McGinley; Vice president / General Manager – Daniel M. Rooney; Director of player personnel – Arthur J. Rooney, Jr.; Public relations director – Ed Kiely; Ticket manager – Joseph H. Carr; Traveling secretary – James A. Boston; Publicity director – Joe Gordon; Office manager – Terrence Jacobs; Ticket office assistant – Arthur Laughlin; Assistant director of player personnel – Bill Nunn; Head coaches: Head coach – Chuck Noll; Offensive coaches: Offensive backfield – Max Coley; Offensive line – Bob Fry; Receivers – Lionel Taylor	Defensive coaches: Defensive line – Walter Hackett; Defensive backfield – Charlie Sumner; Strength and conditioning: Strength coach – Louis Riecke; Team physician, orthopedic – Dr. John Best; Team Physician, M.D. – Dr. David S. Huber; Team dentist – Dr. Robert Gray; Trainer – Ralph Berlin; Assistant trainer – Robert Milie; Equipment manager – Anthony Parisi; Field manager – Jack Hart

=== Roster ===
1970 Pittsburgh Steelers roster
Quarterbacks (QB): 12 Terry Bradshaw; 5 Terry Hanratty; Running backs (RB): 30 Terry Cole; 33 John Fuqua; 26 Preston Pearson; Wide receivers (WR): 32 Hubie Bryant; 25 Ron Shanklin; 82 Dave Smith; 2 Jon Staggers; 86 J. R. Wilburn; Tight ends (TE): 85 Bob Adams; 82 Dennis Hughes	Offensive linemen (OL): 74 John Brown T; 57 Sam Davis G; 76 Mike Haggerty T; 55 Jon Kolb C; 56 Ray Mansfield C; 73 Rick Sharp T; 66 Bruce Van Dyke G; 62 Ralph Wenzel G; Defensive linemen (DL): 71 Dick Arndt DT; 75 Joe Greene DT; 68 L. C. Greenwood DE; 64 Chuck Hinton DT; 60 Ben McGee DE; 65 Lloyd Voss DE; 67 Clarence Washington DT/DE	Linebackers (LB): 58 Chuck Allen MLB; 53 Henry Davis OLB; 69 Jerry Hillebrand OLB; 34 Andy Russell OLB; 61 Brian Stenger MLB; Defensive backs (DB): 29 Fred Barry CB; 37 Chuck Beatty SS; 47 Mel Blount CB; 44 Lee Calland CB; 27 Clancy Oliver FS; 48 John Rowser CB; Special teams (ST): 39 Bobby Walden P; 14 Allan Watson K	Practice squad: 51 Bert Askson LB; 50 Jim Clack C; 24 Kenny Graham S; 84 Dave Kalina WR; 16 Bob Leahy QB; Ara Person TE; 49 John Sodaski S; Reserve: 28 Ocie Austin S (IR); 46 Warren Bankston RB (IR); 20 Rocky Bleier RB (IR); 54 Doug Fisher LB (IR); 79 Larry Gagner G (NF-Inj.); 42 Dick Hoak RB (IR); Rookies in italics 40 active, 6 reserve, 7 practice squad

== Regular season ==
=== Schedule ===
Week	Date	Opponent	Result	Record
1	September 20	**Houston Oilers**	**L** 19–7	0–1
2	September 27	at Denver Broncos	**L** 16–13	0–2
3	October 3	at **Cleveland Browns**	**L** 15–7	0–3
4	October 11	Buffalo Bills	**W** 23–10	1–3
5	October 18	at **Houston Oilers**	**W** 7–3	2–3
6	October 25	at Oakland Raiders	**L** 31–14	2–4
7	November 2	**Cincinnati Bengals**	**W** 21–10	3–4
8	November 8	New York Jets	**W** 21–17	4–4
9	November 15	Kansas City Chiefs	**L** 31–14	4–5
10	November 22	at **Cincinnati Bengals**	**L** 34–7	4–6
11	November 29	**Cleveland Browns**	**W** 28–9	5–6
12	December 6	Green Bay Packers	**L** 20–12	5–7
13	December 13	at Atlanta Falcons	**L** 27–16	5–8
14	December 20	at Philadelphia Eagles	**L** 30–20	5–9
Note: Intra-division opponents are in **bold** text.

=== Game summaries ===
==== Week 1 ====
Team	1	2	3	4	Total
• Oilers	7	7	2	3	19
Steelers	0	0	0	7	7

- Date: September 20
- Location: Three Rivers Stadium
- Game attendance: 45,538
- Game weather: 65 °F or 18.3 °C, relative humidity 68%, wind 8 miles per hour (13 km/h; 7.0 kn)
- Referee: Walt Fitzgerald

Scoring drives:

- Houston – LeVias 22 pass from Johnson (Gerela kick) HOU 7–0
- Houston – LeVias 10 pass from Johnson (Gerela kick) HOU 14–0
- Houston – Safety, Bradshaw forced out of end zone by Pritchard HOU 16–0
- Houston – FG Gerela 8 HOU 19–0
- Pittsburgh – Shanklin 15 pass from Hanratty (Mingo kick) HOU 19–7

The Steelers played their first regular season game at the brand new Three Rivers Stadium. Terry Bradshaw made his NFL debut, but struggled, going 4 for 16 for 40 yds. Bradshaw was also sacked for a safety, the first of three consecutive games in which this would happen. With the loss, the Steelers dropped to 0-1.

==== Week 2 ====
Team	1	2	3	4	Total
Steelers	0	10	3	0	13
• Broncos	7	0	9	0	16

- Date: September 27
- Location: Mile High Stadium
- Game attendance: 50,705
- Game weather: 49 °F or 9.4 °C, relative humidity 54%, wind 7 miles per hour (11 km/h; 6.1 kn)
- Referee: Jack Vest

Scoring drives:

- Denver – Crenshaw 1 run (Howfield kick) DEN 7–0
- Pittsburgh – Hoak 4 run (Mingo kick) T 7–7
- Pittsburgh – FG Mingo 9 PIT 10–7
- Pittsburgh – FG Mingo 13 PIT 13–7
- Denver – Safety, Washington tackled Bradshaw in end zone PIT 13–9
- Denver – Van Heusen 38 pass from Tensi (Howfield kick) DEN 16–13

With the loss, the Steelers fell to 0–2.

==== Week 3 ====
Team	1	2	3	4	Total
Steelers	0	7	0	0	7
• Browns	2	0	13	0	15

- Date: October 3
- Location: Cleveland Municipal Stadium
- Game attendance: 84,349
- Game weather: 54 °F or 12.2 °C, relative humidity 66%, wind 16 miles per hour (26 km/h; 14 kn)
- Referee: George Rennix

Scoring drives:

- Cleveland – Safety, Bradshaw tackled in end zone by Snidow CLE 2–0
- Pittsburgh – Bradshaw 22 run (Mingo kick) PIT 7–2
- Cleveland – Morrison 53 pass from Phipps (kick failed)CLE 8–7
- Cleveland – Barnes 38 pass interception return (Cockroft kick) CLE 15–7

With the loss, the Steelers fell to 0–3.

==== Week 4 ====
Team	1	2	3	4	Total
Bills	3	0	7	0	10
• Steelers	3	7	3	10	23

- Date: October 11
- Location: Three Rivers Stadium
- Game attendance: 42,140
- Game weather: 59 °F or 15 °C, relative humidity 85%, wind 7 miles per hour (11 km/h; 6.1 kn)
- Referee: Bernie Ulman

Scoring drives:

- Pittsburgh – FG Mingo 28 PIT 3–0
- Buffalo – FG Guthrie 52 T 3–3
- Pittsburgh – Smith 6 pass from Hanratty (Mingo kick) PIT 10–3
- Buffalo – Simpson 4 run (Guthrie kick) T 10–10
- Pittsburgh – FG Mingo 49 PIT 13–10
- Pittsburgh – Pearson 2 run (Mingo kick) PIT 20–10
- Pittsburgh – FG Mingo 43 PIT 23–10

The Steelers won their first game, improving to 1–3.

==== Week 5 ====
Team	1	2	3	4	Total
• Steelers	0	7	0	0	7
Oilers	3	0	0	0	3

- Date: October 18
- Location: Houston Astrodome
- Game attendance: 42,799
- Game weather: indoors (domed stadium)
- Referee: Bob Finley

Scoring drives:

- Houston – Gerela 34-yard field goal – HOU 3–0
- Pittsburgh – Shanklin 67-yard pass from Bradshaw (Mingo kick) – PIT 7–3

With the win, the Steelers improved to 2–3 and split the regular season series with the Oilers.

==== Week 6 ====
Team	1	2	3	4	Total
Steelers	0	7	7	0	14
• Raiders	7	17	7	0	31

- Date: October 25
- Location: Oakland–Alameda County Coliseum
- Game attendance: 54,423
- Game weather: 55 °F or 12.8 °C, relative humidity 71%, wind 8 miles per hour (13 km/h; 7.0 kn)
- Referee: Norm Schachter

Scoring drives:

- Oakland – Chester 37 pass from Lamonica (Blanda kick) OAK 7–0
- Pittsburgh – Pearson 2 run (Mingo kick) T 7–7
- Oakland – Wells 44 pass from Blanda (Blanda kick) OAK 14–7
- Oakland – FG Blanda 27 OAK 17–7
- Oakland – Chester 19 pass from Blanda (Blanda kick) OAK 24–7
- Pittsburgh – Hughes 12 pass from Bradshaw (Mingo kick) OAK 24–14
- Oakland – Chester 43 pass from Blanda (Blanda kick) OAK 31–14

In the first of what would become many regular and postseason games between these two teams, the Steelers would lose their very first game to the Raiders as the team dropped to 2–4.

==== Week 7 ====
Team	1	2	3	4	Total
Bengals	0	7	3	0	10
• Steelers	0	7	0	14	21

- Date: November 2
- Location: Three Rivers Stadium
- Game start: 9:00 p.m. EST
- Game attendance: 38,968
- Game weather: 55 °F or 12.8 °C, relative humidity 81%, wind 10 miles per hour (16 km/h; 8.7 kn)
- Referee: Fred Swearingen
- TV announcers (ABC): Keith Jackson, Howard Cosell, and Don Meredith

Scoring drives:

- Cincinnati – Crabtree 2 pass from Carter (Muhlmann kick) CIN 7–0
- Pittsburgh – Hughes 27 pass from Hoak (Mingo kick) T 7–7
- Cincinnati – FG Muhlmann 43 CIN 10–7
- Pittsburgh – Hughes 72 pass from Hanratty (Mingo kick) PIT 14–10
- Pittsburgh – Bankston 2 run (Mingo kick)PIT 21–10
- First Monday night football game played at Three Rivers Stadium.

The Steelers won the very first game between them and the Bengals and the teams' record improved to 3–4.

==== Week 8 ====
Team	1	2	3	4	Total
Jets	3	0	7	7	17
• Steelers	7	7	7	0	21

- Date: November 8
- Location: Three Rivers Stadium
- Game attendance: 50,028
- Game weather: 46 °F or 7.8 °C, relative humidity 74%, wind 7 miles per hour (11 km/h; 6.1 kn)
- Referee: Walt Fitzgerald

Scoring drives:

- New York Jets – FG Turner 17 NYJ 3–0
- Pittsburgh – Fuqua 1 run (Mingo kick) PIT 7–3
- Pittsburgh – Bankston 12 run (Mingo kick) PIT 14–3
- New York Jets – Mercein 15 pass from Woodall (Turner kick) PIT 14–10
- Pittsburgh – Fuqua 6 pass from Hanratty (Mingo kick) PIT 21–10
- New York Jets – Nock 1 run (Turner kick) PIT 21–17

With the win, the Steelers improved to 4–4.

==== Week 9 ====
Team	1	2	3	4	Total
• Chiefs	3	7	7	14	31
Steelers	0	0	7	7	14

- Date: November 15
- Location: Three Rivers Stadium
- Game attendance: 50,081
- Game weather: 42 °F or 5.6 °C, relative humidity 89%, wind 14 miles per hour (23 km/h; 12 kn)
- Referee: John McDonough

Scoring drives:

- Kansas City – FG Stenerud 32 KC 3–0
- Kansas City – Cannon 20 pass from Dawson (Stenerud kick) KC 10–0
- Pittsburgh – Fuqua 2 run (Mingo kick) KC 10–7
- Kansas City – Cannon 8 pass from Dawson (Stenerud kick) KC 17–7
- Kansas City – Taylor 42 pass from Dawson (Stenerud kick) KC 24–7
- Pittsburgh – Staggers 7 pass from Bradshaw (Mingo kick) KC 24–14
- Kansas City – Holmes 2 run (Stenerud kick) KC 31–14

During the game, Dave Smith dropped the ball while attempting to score a touchdown. With the loss, the Steelers fell to 4–5.

==== Week 10 ====
Team	1	2	3	4	Total
Steelers	0	0	7	0	7
• Bengals	6	7	7	14	34

- Date: November 22
- Location: Riverfront Stadium
- Game attendance: 59,276
- Game weather: 47 °F or 8.3 °C, relative humidity 56%, wind 16 miles per hour (26 km/h; 14 kn)
- Referee: Jack Reader

Scoring drives:

- Cincinnati – FG Muhlmann 17 CIN 3–0
- Cincinnati – FG Muhlmann 13 CIN 6–0
- Cincinnati – Carter 5 run (Muhlmann kick) CIN 13–0
- Pittsburgh – Fuqua 1 run (Mingo kick) CIN 13–7
- Cincinnati – Robinson 15 run (Muhlmann kick) CIN 20–7
- Cincinnati – Trumpy 53 pass from Carter (Muhlmann kick) CIN 27–7
- Cincinnati – Crabtree 10 pass from Carter (Muhlmann kick) CIN 34–7

In their first ever game in Cincinnati, the Steelers would lose it by 27 points as the team dropped to 4–6.

==== Week 11 ====
Team	1	2	3	4	Total
Browns	3	3	3	0	9
• Steelers	7	7	7	7	28

- Date: November 29
- Location: Three Rivers Stadium
- Game attendance: 50,214
- Game weather: 45 °F or 7.2 °C, relative humidity 97%, wind 10 miles per hour (16 km/h; 8.7 kn)
- Referee: Ben Dreith

Scoring drives:

- Pittsburgh – Shanklin 8 pass from Hanratty (Watson kick) PIT 7–0
- Cleveland – FG Cockroft 16 PIT 7–3
- Cleveland – FG Cockroft 38 PIT 7–6
- Pittsburgh – Beatty 30 interception return (Watson kick) PIT 14–6
- Cleveland – FG Cockroft 46 PIT 14–9
- Pittsburgh -Shanklin 81 pass from Bradshaw (Watson kick) PIT 21–9
- Pittsburgh – Fuqua 57 pass from Bradshaw (Watson kick) PIT 28–9

With the win, the Steelers improved to 5–6 and finished 3–3 in their division.

==== Week 12 ====
Team	1	2	3	4	Total
• Packers	6	0	7	7	20
Steelers	3	0	6	3	12

- Date: December 6
- Location: Three Rivers Stadium
- Game attendance: 46,418
- Game weather: 23 °F or −5 °C, relative humidity 74%, wind 22 miles per hour (35 km/h; 19 kn), wind chill 7 °F or −13.9 °C
- Referee: Norm Schachter

Scoring drives:

- Green Bay – Krause 100 kickoff return (kick failed) GB 6–0
- Pittsburgh – FG Watson 15 GB 6–3
- Pittsburgh – Smith 87 pass from Bradshaw (kick failed) PIT 9–6
- Green Bay – McGeorge 13 pass from Starr (Livingston kick) GB 13–9
- Pittsburgh – FG Watson 45 GB 13–12
- Green Bay – Hilton 65 pass from Starr (Livingston kick) GB 20–12

With the loss, the Steelers dropped to 5-7 on the year. This would be their last home loss to Green Bay until 2025.

==== Week 13 ====
Team	1	2	3	4	Total
Steelers	6	10	0	0	16
• Falcons	7	3	10	7	27

- Date: December 13
- Location: Atlanta–Fulton County Stadium
- Game attendance: 54,162
- Game weather: 42 °F or 5.6 °C, relative humidity 62%, wind 13 miles per hour (21 km/h; 11 kn)
- Referee: Jack Vest

Scoring drives:

- Atlanta – Malone 5 pass from Johnson (Vinyard kick) ATL 7–0
- Pittsburgh – Fuqua 10 run (kick failed) ATL 7–6
- Pittsburgh – FG Watson 21 PIT 9–7
- Atlanta – FG Vinyard 35 ATL 10–9
- Pittsburgh – Fuqua 1 run (Watson kick) PIT 16–10
- Atlanta – FG Vinyard 17 PIT 16–13
- Atlanta – Mitchell 12 run (Vinyard kick)ATL 20–16
- Atlanta – Flatley 18 pass from Johnson (Vinyard kick) ATL 27–16

==== Week 14 (Sunday December 20, 1970): Philadelphia Eagles ====
Team	1	2	3	4	Total
Steelers	7	7	3	3	20
• Eagles	6	14	0	10	30

- Date: December 20
- Location: Franklin Field
- Game attendance: 55,252
- Game weather: 44 °F or 6.7 °C, relative humidity 62%, wind 14 miles per hour (23 km/h; 12 kn)
- Referee: Bob Finley

Scoring drives:

- Pittsburgh – Fuqua 72 run (Watson kick) PIT 7–0
- Philadelphia – Hawkins 21 pass from Snead (kick failed) PIT 7–6
- Philadelphia – Dirks recovered blocked kick in end zone (Moseley kick) PHI 13–7
- Pittsburgh – Fuqua 85 run (Watson kick) PIT 14–13
- Philadelphia – Ballman 19 pass from Snead (Moseley kick)PHI 20–14
- Pittsburgh – FG Watson 21 PHI 20–17
- Pittsburgh – FG Watson 17 T 20–20
- Philadelphia – FG Moseley 18 PHI 23–20
- Philadelphia – Watkins 1 run (Moseley kick) PHI 30–20

John Fuqua would run for 218 yards

=== Standings ===
AFC Central
	W	L	T	PCT	DIV	CONF	PF	PA	STK
Cincinnati Bengals	8	6	0	.571	3–3	7–4	312	255	W7
Cleveland Browns	7	7	0	.500	4–2	7–4	286	265	W1
Pittsburgh Steelers	5	9	0	.357	3–3	5–6	210	272	L3
Houston Oilers	3	10	1	.231	2–4	3–7–1	217	352	L3

Note: Tie games were not officially counted in the standings until 1972.
