= 1969 Pittsburgh Steelers season =

NFL team season

- Owner: Art Rooney
- Head coach: Chuck Noll
- Home stadium: Pitt Stadium

Results
- Record: 1–13
- Division place: 4th NFL Century
- Playoffs: Did not qualify
- All-Pros: Roy Jefferson (1st team)
- Pro Bowlers: 4: RB Dick Hoak; WR Roy Jefferson; DE Ben McGee; LB Andy Russell
- Team MVP: Roy Jefferson

The 1969 Pittsburgh Steelers season was the franchise's 37th in the National Football League. It would mark a turning point of the Steelers franchise. 1969 was the first season for Hall of Fame head coach Chuck Noll, the first season for defensive lineman "Mean Joe" Greene and L. C. Greenwood, the first season for longtime Steelers public relations director Joe Gordon, and the team's last season in Pitt Stadium before moving into then-state-of-the-art Three Rivers Stadium the following season.

Although considered a turning point in the team's history, the results were not immediate; after winning the season opener against the Detroit Lions, the Steelers lost every game afterwards to finish 1–13. The Steelers became the first team in NFL history since the 1936 Philadelphia Eagles to win its season opener and lose every remaining game. This feat would later be matched by the 2001 Carolina Panthers and the 2020 Jacksonville Jaguars. The Steelers finished 1969 4th in the NFL Century Division and tied with the Chicago Bears for last in the NFL. The Steelers finished 1–6 at Pitt Stadium for the fourth time in five seasons, but would be the last time the Steelers finished the season with a losing record at home until 1999.

As a result of their 1–13 records, Art Rooney of the Steelers won a coin toss with George Halas of the Bears to determine who would select Louisiana Tech quarterback Terry Bradshaw (the consensus number 1 selection among league teams) with the number one pick in the 1970 draft. By modern NFL tiebreaking rules, the Steelers would have automatically been given the first pick anyway, as the Bears' one win came against the Steelers in Week 8. Only four players from that 1969 team (defensive linemen Joe Greene and L.C. Greenwood and offensive linemen Sam Davis and Jon Kolb) would appear in all 4 of the Steelers Super Bowl wins of the 1970s.

== Offseason ==
In the 1969 offseason, the Steelers hired former defensive coordinator Chuck Noll from the Baltimore Colts days after his loss to the New York Jets in Super Bowl III. Noll became the team's 14th head coach in the franchise's history. While it took 36 seasons to go through the first 13, Noll stayed through 1991, establishing coaching stability for the Steelers not seen in other NFL franchises for the next 46. Since Noll's retirement, only Bill Cowher, Mike Tomlin and present head coach Mike McCarthy have served as head coach of the Steelers.

According to Linebacker Andy Russell and other Steelers present, Noll assembled the team for their first meeting and plainly stated his thoughts on why the Steelers had lost so often for so long.

"So Coach Noll's first meeting, I'll never forget the speech he gave," said Russell, who became a highly successful businessman after retiring from football in 1976. "He gets up and says, 'I've been watching the game film since I took the job, and I can tell you guys why you've been losing.' You could have heard a pin drop in that room. He says, 'The reason you have been losing is you're not any good.'" he said, 'I'm going to get rid of most of you.' Five of us made it from that room to the Super Bowl in '74."

Noll promoted scout Bill Nunn to a full-time position. Only a handful of players were carried over from the 1968 squad to the 1974 Super Bowl Squad, most notably veterans Andy Russell, Rocky Bleier, Ray Mansfield, Sam Davis and Bobby Walden. Additionally, Dick Hoak, who retired before the 1972 season, became the team's running backs coach and remained with the team in that capacity through the 2006 season. Bleier, who played his rookie season the year before and later became a major contributor to the Super Bowl championship teams, was fighting in Vietnam during this time and was wounded in combat just before the start of the season.

=== 1969 NFL draft ===
1969 Pittsburgh Steelers draft
Round	Pick	Player	Position	College	Notes
1	3	Joe Greene * ^{†}	DT	North Texas	#75
2	30	Terry Hanratty	QB	Notre Dame	#5
2	42	Warren Bankston	RB	Tulane	#46
3	56	Jon Kolb	C	Oklahoma State	#55
4	82	Bob Campbell	RB	Penn State	
7	160	Chuck Beatty	DB	North Texas	#37
8	186	Joe Cooper	WR	Tennessee State	
9	212	John Sodaski	DB	Villanova	#49
10	238	L. C. Greenwood *	DE	Arkansas AM&N	#68
11	264	Clarence Washington	DT	Arkansas AM&N	
12	290	Doug Fisher	LB	San Diego State	
13	315	John Lynch	LB	Drake	
14	342	Bob Hourman	RB	Ohio	
15	368	Ken Liberto	WR	Louisiana Tech	
16	394	Dock Mosley	WR	Alcorn A&M	
17	420	Bill Eppright	PK	Kent State	
Made roster † Pro Football Hall of Fame * Made at least one Pro Bowl during career

Although the Pittsburgh Steelers missed out on Heisman Trophy winner O. J. Simpson, Chuck Noll used the 1st Round pick wisely by drafting North Texas State Defensive tackle, Joe Greene. Noll said years later that Greene would've been selected even if they had the top overall pick, passing over Simpson. Although Simpson went on to a Hall of Fame career before legal troubles overshadowed his NFL accomplishments, Steeler scouting set the standard with their excellent NFL scouting in the draft for years to come.

Greene's selection was not without controversy. The front page of the Pittsburgh Post-Gazette the next morning had a headline posted Who's Joe Greene?, owing to his relative obscurity despite being named a consensus All-American selection his senior year. The team also drafted Greene's defensive line mate, Arkansas AM&N defensive end L. C. Greenwood, in the tenth round. Greene and Greenwood formed the core of the famed Steel Curtain defensive line and played their entire career as teammates, with both retiring at the end of the 1981 season. The following year, Noll switched the team to a 3–4 defense, partially as a result of the retirement of two of his best defensive players.

Selecting Greene was wise. He was the 1969 Defensive Rookie of the Year at season's end.

Joe Gordon was hired as the team's public relations director. Though his role was more behind-the-scenes, he would remain with the team in that capacity through the 1998 season, second only to Dick Hoak in terms of tenure with the team outside of the Rooney family, third counting Steelers radio commentator Myron Cope, who was not employed by the team but was associated with it through WTAE Radio and later WDVE on the official Steelers radio network.

Among the more notable undrafted free agents on the training camp roster was defensive lineman Ed O'Neill from Youngstown State. Although he didn't make the team, O'Neill would go on to fame as an actor, most notably as Al Bundy on the TV series Married... with Children, which locally aired on WPGH-TV.

=== Undrafted free agents ===
1969 undrafted free agents of note
Player	Position	College
John Nice	Running back	Delaware Valley

== Personnel ==
=== Staff / Coaches ===
1969 Pittsburgh Steelers staff
Front office: President – Arthur J. Rooney; Vice president – John R. McGinley; Vice president / General Manager – Daniel M. Rooney; Director of player personnel – Arthur J. Rooney, Jr.; Public relations director – Ed Kiely; Ticket manager – Joseph H. Carr; Traveling secretary – James A. Boston; Publicity director – Joe Gordon; Office manager – Terrence Jacobs; Ticket office assistant – Arthur Laughlin; Assistant director of player personnel – Bill Nunn; Head coaches: Head coach – Chuck Noll; Offensive coaches: Offensive backfield – Max Coley; Offensive line – Bob Fry; Receivers – Dick Coury	Defensive coaches: Defensive line – Walter Hackett; Defensive backfield – Charlie Sumner; Strength and conditioning: Strength coach – Louis Riecke; Team physician, orthopedic – Dr. John Best; Team Physician, M.D. – Dr. David S. Huber; Team dentist – Dr. Robert Gray; Trainer – Ralph Berlin; Assistant trainer – Robert Milie; Equipment manager – Anthony Parisi; Field manager – Jack Hart

=== Roster ===
1969 Pittsburgh Steelers roster
Quarterbacks (QB): 5 Terry Hanratty; 10 Kent Nix; 17 Dick Shiner; Running backs (RB): 46 Warren Bankston; 38 Earl Gros; 42 Dick Hoak; 36 Don McCall; Wide receivers (WR): 83 Don Alley; 23 Bob Campbell; 24 Jon Henderson; 87 Roy Jefferson; 86 J. R. Wilburn; 43 Erwin Williams; Tight ends (TE): 85 Bob Adams	Offensive linemen (OL): 74 John Brown T; 57 Sam Davis G; 76 Mike Haggerty T; 55 Jon Kolb C; 56 Ray Mansfield C; 66 Bruce Van Dyke G; 62 Ralph Wenzel G; Defensive linemen (DL): 71 Dick Arndt DT; 75 Joe Greene DT; 68 L. C. Greenwood DE; 64 Chuck Hinton DT; 60 Ben McGee DE; 67 Clarence Washington DT/DE; 65 Lloyd Voss DE	Linebackers (LB): 54 Doug Fisher OLB; 59 Ray May MLB; 34 Andy Russell OLB; 61 Brian Stenger OLB; 52 Sid Williams MLB; Defensive backs (DB): 37 Chuck Beatty SS; 44 Lee Calland CB; 20 Paul Martha FS; 27 Clancy Oliver CB; 21 Jim Shorter CB; Special teams (ST): 11 Gene Mingo K; 39 Bobby Walden P	Practice squad: 73 Ernie Ruple T; Reserve: 26 Rocky Bleier RB (Military); 41 Larry Elkins WR (IR); 79 Larry Gagner G (IR); 69 Jerry Hillebrand LB (IR); 82 John Hilton TE (IR); 29 Bob Hohn CB (IR); Rookies in italics 40 active, 6 reserve, 1 practice squad

== Regular season ==
=== Summary ===
The 1969 season started off well for the Steelers. After defeating the Detroit Lions 16–13, much of the roster believed they were on a Super Bowl run. However, after losing three straight times, first at Philadelphia 41–27, then at home against the Cardinals 27–14, and at New York against the Giants 10–7, team morale plummeted. The Steelers then lost the next 10 games and became the first team in league history since the 1936 Philadelphia Eagles to win their season opener but then lose every other game until the 2001 Carolina Panthers. Though after these losses, Art Rooney Sr. still had faith in Chuck Noll, and retained him for 1970. With the 1–13 record, the Steelers won a coin toss against the Chicago Bears (also 1–13). For the first time since 1956, the Steelers got the first pick in the NFL draft and selected Louisiana Tech quarterback Terry Bradshaw.

=== Schedule ===
Week	Date	Opponent	Result	Record	Venue
1	September 21	Detroit Lions	**W** 16–13	1–0	Pitt Stadium
2	September 28	at Philadelphia Eagles	**L** 27–41	1–1	Franklin Field
3	October 5	**St. Louis Cardinals**	**L** 14–27	1–2	Pitt Stadium
4	October 12	at **New York Giants**	**L** 7–10	1–3	Yankee Stadium
5	October 18	at **Cleveland Browns**	**L** 31–42	1–4	Cleveland Municipal Stadium
6	October 26	Washington Redskins	**L** 7–14	1–5	Pitt Stadium
7	November 2	Green Bay Packers	**L** 34–38	1–6	Pitt Stadium
8	November 9	at Chicago Bears	**L** 7–38	1–7	Wrigley Field
9	November 16	**Cleveland Browns**	**L** 3–24	1–8	Pitt Stadium
10	November 23	at Minnesota Vikings	**L** 14–52	1–9	Metropolitan Stadium
11	November 30	at **St. Louis Cardinals**	**L** 10–47	1–10	Busch Stadium
12	December 7	Dallas Cowboys	**L** 7–10	1–11	Pitt Stadium
13	December 14	**New York Giants**	**L** 17–21	1–12	Pitt Stadium
14	December 21	at New Orleans Saints	**L** 24–27	1–13	Tulane Stadium
Note: Intra-division opponents are in **bold** text.

=== Game summaries ===
==== Week 1 (Sunday September 21, 1969): Detroit Lions ====
	1	2	3	4	Total
Lions	3	0	3	7	**13**
**Steelers**	3	6	0	7	**16**

at Pitt Stadium, Pittsburgh, Pennsylvania

- Game time: 1:00 PM EST
- Game weather: 80 degrees Fahrenheit and sunny at kickoff
- Game attendance: 51,360
- Referee: Pat Haggerty
- TV announcers:

Scoring Drives:

- Detroit – FG Mann 23 yds, 0–3
- Pittsburgh – FG Mingo 27 yds, 3–3
- Pittsburgh – FG Mingo 18 yds, 6–3
- Pittsburgh – FG Mingo 40 yds, 9–3
- Detroit – FG Mann 23 yds, 9–6
- Detroit – McCullouch 12 yd pass from Munson (Mann kick), 9–13
- Pittsburgh – Bankston 6 yd run (Mingo kick), 16–13

Steelers running back Warren Bankston fumbled twice but turned out to be the game's hero by scoring a 6-yard touchdown with just 3 minutes to play. On the touchdown, he broke attempted tackles by Wayne Walker and Mike Weger. Detroit's last drive was snuffed out by the Steelers on a fourth and one play that failed at the Lions' 36 yard line. Bankston ran for 52 yards in the game.

==== Week 2 (Sunday September 28, 1969): Philadelphia Eagles ====
	1	2	3	4	Total
Steelers	13	0	7	7	**27**
**Eagles**	0	17	14	10	**41**

at Franklin Field, Philadelphia

- Game time:
- Game weather:
- Game attendance: 60,658
- Referee: Bernie Ulman
- TV announcers:

Scoring Drives:

- Pittsburgh – FG Mingo 36 yds, 3–0
- Pittsburgh – Gros 8 yd pass from Shiner (Mingo kick), 10–0
- Pittsburgh – FG Mingo 15 yds, 13–0
- Philadelphia – Hawkins 28 yd pass from Snead (Baker kick), 13–7
- Philadelphia – FG Baker 35 yds, 10–13
- Philadelphia – Hawkins 28 yd pass from Snead (Baker kick), 13–17
- Philadelphia – Hawkins 47 yd pass from Snead (Baker kick), 13–24
- Philadelphia – Hawkins 15 yd pass from Snead (Baker kick), 13–31
- Pittsburgh – Hoak 3 yd run (Mingo kick), 20–31
- Pittsburgh – Jefferson 14 yd pass from Shiner (Mingo kick), 27–31
- Philadelphia – FG Baker 41 yds, 27–34
- Philadelphia – Jackson 56 yd pass from Snead (Baker kick), 27–41

The Steelers fell apart after the first quarter. Roy Jefferson caught 7 passes for 123 and scored a touchdown.

==== Week 3 (Sunday October 5, 1969): St. Louis Cardinals ====
	1	2	3	4	Total
**Cardinals**	0	20	0	7	**27**
Steelers	7	0	7	0	**14**

at Pitt Stadium, Pittsburgh, Pennsylvania

- Game time:
- Game weather:
- Game attendance: 45,011
- Referee: George Rennix
- TV announcers:

Scoring Drives:

- Pittsburgh – Jefferson 2 yd pass from Shiner (Mingo kick), 7–0
- St. Louis – FG Bakken 42 yds, 7–3
- St. Louis – Crenshaw 26 yd run (Bakken kick), 7–10
- St. Louis – FG Bakken 35 yds, 7–13
- St. Louis – Crenshaw 4 yd run (Bakken kick), 7–20
- Pittsburgh – Jefferson 48 yd pass from Nix (Mingo kick), 14–20
- St. Louis – Gilliam 58 yd pass from Hart (Bakken kick), 14–27

The Steelers committed 5 turnovers. Jefferson caught 9 passes for 115 yards and scored 2 touchdowns.

==== Week 4 at Giants ====
Pittsburgh Steelers (1–2) at New York Giants (2–1)

Quarter	1	2	3	4	Total
Steelers	0	0	0	7	**7**
Giants	7	0	0	3	**10**

at Yankee Stadium • Bronx, New York

- Date: October 12
- Game weather: 67 °F (19 °C) • Wind 9
- Game attendance: 62,987
- Pro-Football-Reference.com

Game information

Steelers

- Dick Shiner
  14/24, 132 Yds, 2 INT
- Dick Hoak
  13 Rush, 64 Yds
- Roy Jefferson
  3 Rec, 58 Yds

Giants

- Fran Tarkenton
  16/29, 154 Yds, TD
- Ernie Koy Jr.
  8 Rush, 23 Yds
- Homer Jones
  3 Rec, 56 Yds

Scoring summary

Quarter	Time	Drive			Team	Scoring information	Score	
Quarter	Time	Plays	Yards	TOP	Team	Scoring information	PIT	NYG
1					Giants	Morrison 7-yard touchdown reception from Tarkenton, Gogolak kick good	0	7
4					Giants	14-yard field goal by Gogolak	0	10
4					Steelers	Shiner 18-yard touchdown run, Mingo kick good	7	10
"TOP" = time of possession. For other American football terms, see Glossary of American football.							7	10

==== Week 5 (Saturday October 18, 1969): Cleveland Browns ====
	1	2	3	4	Total
Steelers	0	10	0	21	**31**
**Browns**	7	7	7	21	**42**

at Cleveland Municipal Stadium, Cleveland, Ohio

- Game time:
- Game weather:
- Game attendance: 84,078
- Referee: Pat Haggerty
- TV announcers:

Scoring Drives:

- Cleveland – Collins 4 yd pass from Nelsen (Cockroft kick)0–7
- Pittsburgh – Hoak 4 yd run (Mingo kick)7–7
- Cleveland – Kelly 1 yd run (Cockroft kick)7–14
- Pittsburgh – FG Mingo 38 yds 10–14
- Cleveland - Barnes 55 yd interception return (Cockroft kick)10–21
- Cleveland – Sumner 40 yd interception return (Cockroft kick)10–28
- Cleveland - Collins 48 yd pass from Nelsen (Cockroft kick)10–35
- Pittsburgh – Gros 15 yd pass from Hanratty (Mingo kick)17–35
- Pittsburgh – Jefferson 10 yd pass from Nix (Mingo kick)24–35
- Cleveland – Morrison 1 yd run (Cockroft kick)24–42
- Pittsburgh – Jefferson 15 yd pass from Hanratty (Mingo kick)31–42

The bumbling Steelers gave away two touchdowns to the rival Browns on interception returns. With less than 7 minutes left to go in the 3rd Quarter, Steelers Quarterback Terry Hanratty was intercepted by Erich Barnes and then in the 4th by Walt Sumner. The 4th quarter was a wild affair with a combined 6 touchdowns scored. Roy Jefferson caught 7 passes for 110 yards and 2 touchdowns. The Steelers used two other quarterbacks besides Hanratty (Dick Shiner and Kent Nix).

==== Week 6 (Sunday October 26, 1969): Washington Redskins ====
	1	2	3	4	Total
**Redskins**	0	0	14	0	**14**
Steelers	7	0	0	0	**7**

at Pitt Stadium, Pittsburgh, Pennsylvania

- Game time:
- Game weather:
- Game attendance: 46,557
- Referee: Tommy Bell
- TV announcers:

Scoring Drives:

- Pittsburgh – Gros 8 yd pass from Hanratty (Mingo kick), 7–0
- Washington – Jurgensen 10 yd run (Knight kick), 7–7
- Washington – Taylor 17 yd pass from Jurgensen (Knight kick), 7–14

The game was designated as Steeler Alumni Day and before the game, wounded Vietnam Veteran Rocky Bleier, using a cane, walked across the field to a standing ovation from the crowd of 46,000. The Steelers defense played well enough to keep the team in the game but the offense could find no traction. The game would feature the only head-to-head matchup between Noll and Vince Lombardi as head coaches, as Lombardi died of cancer less than a year later.

==== Week 7 (Sunday November 2, 1969): Green Bay Packers ====
	1	2	3	4	Total
**Packers**	0	14	10	14	**38**
Steelers	10	7	7	10	**34**

at Pitt Stadium, Pittsburgh, Pennsylvania

- Game time:
- Game weather:
- Game attendance: 46,403
- Referee: Bernie Ulman
- TV announcers:

Scoring Drives:

- Pittsburgh – FG Mingo 19 yds, 3–0
- Pittsburgh – Jefferson 38 yd pass from Hanratty (Mingo kick), 10–0
- Green Bay – Horn 2 yd run (Mercer kick), 10–7
- Green Bay – T. Williams 83 yd punt return (Mercer kick), 10–14
- Pittsburgh – Hoak 3 yd pass from Hanratty (Mingo kick), 17–14
- Pittsburgh – Williams 6 yd pass from Hanratty (Mingo kick), 24–14
- Green Bay – FG Mercer 15 yds, 24–17
- Green Bay – T. Williams 96 yd kickoff return (Mercer kick), 24–24
- Pittsburgh – Jefferson 53 yd pass from Shiner (Mingo kick), 31–24
- Pittsburgh – FG Mingo 32 yds, 34–24
- Green Bay – Dale 43 yd pass from Starr (Mercer kick), 34–31
- Green Bay – Starr 1 yd run (Mercer Kick), 34–38

The Steelers defense forced 5 turnovers and held the vaunted Packers running game to less than 100 yards. The offense gained more total yards than the Packers. The improved play kept Pittsburgh in the see-saw game but it wasn't enough. Jefferson shined again by catching 7 passes for 167 yards and two scores. The Steelers could not find a solution for the Packers Carroll Dale, who had similar statistics. The Packers Travis Williams had a spectacular game, scoring two touchdowns on a punt return and a kickoff return. Bart Starr sat out more than half the game, nursing a sore shoulder, but came into the game in relief of Dan Horn to lead the Packers.

==== Week 8 (Sunday November 9, 1969): Chicago Bears ====
	1	2	3	4	Total
Steelers	0	0	0	7	**7**
**Bears**	16	13	9	0	**38**

at Wrigley Field, Chicago

- Game time:
- Game weather:
- Game attendance: 45,856
- Referee: Fred Silva
- TV announcers:

Scoring Drives:

- Chicago – Piccolo 25 yd pass from Douglass (Percival kick), 0–7
- Chicago – Safety, Hanratty tackled in end zone by O'Bradovich, 0–9
- Chicago – Sayers 2 yd run (Percival kick), 0–16
- Chicago – FG Percival 27 yds, 0–19
- Chicago – Wallace 12 yd pass from Douglass (Percival kick), 0–26
- Chicago – FG Percival 35 yds, 0–29
- Chicago – Safety, Shiner tackled in end zone by Butkus, 0–31
- Chicago – Sayers, 1 yd run (Percival kick), 0–38
- Pittsburgh – Gros 2 yd run (Mingo kick), 7–38

Sacked 8 times, twice for safeties, Dick Shiner and Terry Hanratty were terrorized by Dick Butkus and his defense, giving the Bears their only win in 1969. This would be the last game the Steelers would play at Wrigley Field and it also was Brian Piccolo's last home game for the Bears. He was diagnosed with cancer later that month and died in June 1970.

==== Week 9 (Sunday November 16, 1969): Cleveland Browns ====
	1	2	3	4	Total
**Browns**	7	3	0	14	**24**
Steelers	3	0	0	0	**3**

at Pitt Stadium, Pittsburgh, Pennsylvania

- Game time:
- Game weather:
- Game attendance: 47,670
- Referee: George Rennix
- TV announcers:

Scoring Drives:

- Cleveland – Collins 26 yd pass from Nelsen (Cockroft kick), 0–7
- Pittsburgh – FG Mingo 31 yds, 3–7
- Cleveland – FG Cockroft 28 yds, 3–10
- Cleveland – Warfield 12 yd pass from Nelsen (Cockroft kick), 3–17
- Cleveland – Kelly 1 yd run (Cockroft kick), 3–24

Warren Bankston gained 96 yards while Roy Jefferson, going into the game as the NFL's leading receiver, was bottled up all day in double coverage. Former Steeler turned Browns QB Bill Nelsen turned crucial plays into completed passes to Paul Warfield to pace the Browns.

==== Week 10 (Sunday November 23, 1969): Minnesota Vikings ====
	1	2	3	4	Total
Steelers	0	7	7	0	**14**
**Vikings**	7	10	14	21	**52**

at Metropolitan Stadium, Bloomington, Minnesota

- Game time:
- Game weather:
- Game attendance: 47,202
- Referee: Pat Haggerty
- TV announcers:

Scoring Drives:

- Minnesota – Krause 77 yd interception return (Cox kick), 0–7
- Minnesota – FG Cox 22 yds, 0–10
- Pittsburgh – McCall 101 yd kickoff return (Mingo kick), 7–10
- Minnesota – Brown 1 yd run (Cox kick), 7–17
- Minnesota – Henderson 28 yd pass from Cuozzo (Cox kick), 7–24
- Pittsburgh – Henderson 10 yd pass from Hanratty (Mingo kick), 14–24
- Minnesota – Beasley 60 yd fumble return (Cox kick), 14–31
- Minnesota – Reed 6 yd pass from Cuozzo (Cox kick), 14–38
- Minnesota – Reed 1 yd run (Cox kick), 14–45
- Minnesota – Henderson 7 yd pass from Lee (Cox kick), 14–52

For the third straight week, the Steelers were embarrassed and never in the game. The Vikings scored on an interception return, a fumble return, three passes and two runs. The fumble return came after Charlie West fumbled a kickoff and John Beasley picked up the ball and ran 60 yards for a score. Joe Greene, the Steelers rookie (and future Hall of Famer) was thrown out of the game after losing his temper.

==== Week 11 (Sunday November 30, 1969): St. Louis Cardinals ====
	1	2	3	4	Total
Steelers	0	3	0	7	**10**
**Cardinals**	6	6	7	28	**47**

at Busch Memorial Stadium, St. Louis, Missouri

- Game time:
- Game weather:
- Game attendance: 43,721
- Referee: Jim Tunney
- TV announcers:

Scoring Drives:

- St. Louis – Williams 7 yd pass from Hart (kick blocked), 0–6
- St. Louis – FG Bakken 32 yds, 0–9
- Pittsburgh – FG Mingo 19 yds, 3–9
- St. Louis – FG Bakken 12 yds, 3–12
- St. Louis – Edwards 2 yd run (Bakken kick), 3–19
- St. Louis – Williams 5 yd pass from Hart (Bakken kick), 3–26
- St. Louis – Williams 9 yd pass from Hart (Bakken kick), 3–33
- St. Louis – Hart 1 yd run (Bakken kick), 3–40
- St. Louis – Shivers 1 yd run (Bakken kick), 3–47
- Pittsburgh – Henderson 20 yd pass from Hanratty (Mingo kick), 10–47

The Steelers were beaten to a pulp as St Louis out gained them 401 to 187 yards. In the last four games the Steelers were outscored 161 to 34.

==== Week 12 (Sunday December 7, 1969): Dallas Cowboys ====
	1	2	3	4	Total
**Cowboys**	3	7	0	0	**10**
Steelers	0	0	0	7	**7**

at Pitt Stadium, Pittsburgh, Pennsylvania

- Game time:
- 'Game weather:'Pouring rain, cold, muddy, ugly day. I was there.
- Game attendance: 24,990
- Referee: Bernie Ulman
- TV announcers:

Scoring Drives:

- Dallas – FG M. Clark 32 yds, 0–3
- Dallas – Morton 12 yd run (M. Clark kick), 0–10
- Pittsburgh – Henderson 29 yd pass from Shiner (Mingo kick), 7–10

The Steelers bounced back with an impressive effort against the powerhouse Cowboys at home. Dallas was playing to clinch a playoff spot but they had to battle through a mud bog to earn the prize. What turned out to be the winning field goal was set up by a punt return from Mel Renfro. The Steelers didn't cross midfield until the 4th quarter as snow began to fall. They kept the game close until Dick Shiner came off the bench and led them to a touchdown drive. A drive sputtered out with less than 2 minutes left but the Steelers got yet another chance. Shiner hit Roy Jefferson on a long pass to the Dallas 20 yard line but the game ended.

==== Week 13 (Sunday December 14, 1969): New York Giants ====
	1	2	3	4	Total
**Giants**	7	7	0	7	**21**
Steelers	0	14	0	3	**17**

at Pitt Stadium, Pittsburgh, Pennsylvania

- Game time:
- Game weather:
- Game attendance: 21,067
- Referee: Fred Silva
- TV announcers: Jack Buck, Jack Whitaker CBS

Scoring Drives:

- New York Giants – Koy 34 yd pass from Tarkenton (Gogolak kick), 0–7
- Pittsburgh – Jefferson 15 yd pass from Shiner (Mingo kick), 7–7
- Pittsburgh – Jefferson 9 yd pass from Shiner (Mingo kick), 14–7
- New York Giants – Morrison 10 yd pass form Tarkenton (Gogolak kick), 14–14
- Pittsburgh – FG Mingo 41 yds, 17–14
- New York Giants – Koy 4 yd pass from Tarkenton (Gogolak kick), 17–21

Returning to his earlier season form, Roy Jefferson caught 5 passes for 112 yards and 2 touchdowns but the Giants' Fran Tarkenton was masterful in throwing three touchdowns. In their final game at Pitt Stadium, the Steelers were in control of the game and seemed poised to win but were undone after Giants punter Dave Dunaway ran instead of punting and gained a first down for the New Yorkers. With the game on the line and the Steelers leading, Tarkenton faked a handoff to the middle of the line and then threw the ball to Ernie Koy, who was not covered by a defender. The hard luck Steelers left the muddy and snowy field as losers again.

==== Week 14 (Sunday December 21, 1969): New Orleans Saints ====
	1	2	3	4	Total
Steelers	14	0	7	3	**24**
**Saints**	0	10	7	10	**27**

at Tulane Stadium, New Orleans, Louisiana

- Game time: 1:00 p.m. CST
- Game weather:
- Game attendance: 72,256
- Referee: Fred Swearingen
- TV announcers:

Scoring Drives:

- Pittsburgh – Gros 8 yd run (Mingo kick), 7–0
- Pittsburgh – Gros 16 yd run (Mingo kick), 14–0
- New Orleans – Poage 3 yd pass from Kilmer (Dempsey kick), 14–7
- New Orleans – FG Dempsey 38 yds, 14–10
- New Orleans – Poage 3 yd pass from Kilmer (Dempsey kick), 14–17
- Pittsburgh – Gros 7 yd run (Mingo kick), 21–17
- Pittsburgh – FG Mingo 11 yds, 24–17
- New Orleans – FG Dempsey 40 yds, 24–20
- New Orleans – Livingston 3 yd run (Dempsey kick), 24–27

Earl Gros, a Louisiana native who played at LSU, ran for 3 touchdowns but the Steelers blew a 14-point lead to a Saints team that had not been in existence four years earlier.

The Steelers did not return to New Orleans until 1974, when they defeated the Saints in the regular season, then ousted the Minnesota Vikings in Super Bowl IX seven weeks later.

== Standings ==
NFL Century
	W	L	T	PCT	DIV	CONF	PF	PA	STK
Cleveland Browns	10	3	1	.769	4–1–1	8–1–1	351	300	L1
New York Giants	6	8	0	.429	4–2	4–6	264	298	W3
St. Louis Cardinals	4	9	1	.308	3–2–1	3–6–1	314	389	L3
Pittsburgh Steelers	1	13	0	.071	0–6	0–10	218	404	L13

Note: Tie games were not officially counted in the standings until 1972.
