= 1971 Pittsburgh Steelers season =

39th season in franchise history

- Owner: Art Rooney
- General manager: Dan Rooney
- Head coach: Chuck Noll
- Home stadium: Three Rivers Stadium

Results
- Record: 6–8
- Division place: 2nd AFC Central
- Playoffs: Did not qualify
- All-Pros: None
- Pro Bowlers: 2: DT Joe Greene; LB Andy Russell
- Team MVP: Andy Russell

The 1971 Pittsburgh Steelers season was the team's 39th in the National Football League. The team showed improvement, finishing in second place in the AFC Central Division with a 6–8 record. Terry Bradshaw struggled with turnovers in his second season, throwing 22 interceptions to 13 touchdown passes. The Steelers that year drafted wide receiver Frank Lewis, Hall of Fame linebacker Jack Ham, guard Gerry Mullins, defensive end Dwight White, tight end/tackle Larry Brown, defensive tackle Ernie Holmes, and safety Mike Wagner, while signing safety Glen Edwards as an undrafted free agent; all of them were key contributors during the Steelers Super Bowl teams of the 1970s.

== Offseason ==
=== NFL draft ===
Round	Pick	Player	Position	College	Notes
1	8	Frank Lewis	WR	Grambling	
2	34	Jack Ham	LB	Penn State	
3	60	Steven Davis	RB	Delaware State	
4	86	Gerry Mullins	TE	USC	
4	104	Dwight White	DE	East Texas State	
5	106	Larry Brown	TE	Kansas	
5	112	Melvin Holmes	OT	North Carolina A&T	
5	126	Ralph Anderson	DB	West Texas State	
5	128	Fred Brister	LB	Mississippi	
6	138	Craig Hanneman	OT	Oregon State	
7	164	Worthy McClure	OT	Mississippi	
8	184	Larry Crowe	RB	Texas Southern	
8	190	Paul Rogers	PK	Nebraska	
8	203	Ernie Holmes	DT	Texas Southern	
9	216	Mike Anderson	LB	LSU	
10	242	Jim O'Shea	TE	Boston College	
11	268	Mike Wagner	DB	Western Illinois	
13	320	Alfred Young	WR	South Carolina State	
14	346	McKinney Evans	DB	New Mexico Highlands	
15	372	Ray Makin	OG	Kentucky	
16	398	Walter Huntley	DB	Trinity	
17	424	Danny Ehle	RB	Howard Payne	

== Personnel ==
=== Staff ===
1971 Pittsburgh Steelers staff
Front office: President – Arthur J. Rooney; Vice president – John R. McGinley; Vice president – Daniel M. Rooney; Vice president – Arthur J. Rooney, Jr.; Public relations director – Ed Kiely; Ticket manager – Joseph H. Carr; Traveling secretary – James A. Boston; Publicity director – Joe Gordon; Office manager – Terrence Jacobs; Ticket office assistant – Arthur Laughlin; Director of player personnel – Dick Haley; Assistant director of player personnel – Bill Nunn; Head coaches: Head coach – Chuck Noll; Offensive coaches: Offensive backfield – Max Coley; Offensive line – Bob Fry; Quarterbacks – Babe Parilli; Receivers – Lionel Taylor	Defensive coaches: Defensive line – Walter Hackett; Defensive backfield – Charlie Sumner; Strength and conditioning: Strength coach – Louis Riecke; Team physician, orthopedic – Dr. John Best; Team Physician, M.D. – Dr. David S. Huber; Team dentist – Dr. Robert Gray; Trainer – Ralph Berlin; Equipment manager – Anthony Parisi, Jack Hart

=== Roster ===
1971 Pittsburgh Steelers roster
Quarterbacks (QB): 12 Terry Bradshaw; 16 Bob Leahy; Running backs (RB): 46 Warren Bankston; 20 Rocky Bleier; 36 Jim Brumfield; 33 John Fuqua; 26 Preston Pearson; Wide receivers (WR): 43 Frank Lewis; 25 Ronnie Shanklin; 82 Dave Smith; 2 Jon Staggers; 31 Al Young; Tight ends (TE): 85 Bob Adams; 87 Larry Brown	Offensive linemen (OL): 74 John Brown T; 50 Jim Clack C/G; 77 Melvin Holmes T; 55 Jon Kolb T; 56 Ray Mansfield C; 51 Bobby Maples C; 72 Gerry Mullins G; 66 Bruce Van Dyke G; Defensive linemen (DL): 76 Bert Askson DE; 75 Joe Greene DT; 68 L. C. Greenwood DE; 60 Ben McGee DT; 65 Lloyd Voss DT; 78 Dwight White DE	Linebackers (LB): 53 Henry Davis OLB; 59 Jack Ham OLB; 34 Andy Russell OLB; 61 Brian Stenger MLB; Defensive backs (DB): 49 Ralph Anderson FS; 28 Ocie Austin FS; 37 Chuck Beatty SS; 47 Mel Blount CB; 44 Lee Calland CB; 48 John Rowser CB; Special teams (ST): 10 Roy Gerela K; 39 Bobby Walden P	Practice squad: -- Craig Hanneman DE; 82 Dennis Hughes TE; -- John Lanier RB; 73 Rick Sharp T; Reserve: 58 Chuck Allen LB (IR); 57 Sam Davis G (IR); 35 Steve Davis RB (NF-Ill.); 27 Glen Edwards S (IR); 5 Terry Hanratty QB (IR); 54 Dennis Onkotz LB (IR); 23 Mike Wagner S (IR); 67 Clarence Washington DT (IR); Rookies in italics 40 active, 8 reserve, 4 practice squad

== Regular season ==
=== Schedule ===
Week	Date	Opponent	Result
1	September 19, 1971	at Chicago Bears	L 17–15
2	September 26, 1971	Cincinnati Bengals	W 21–10
3	October 3, 1971	San Diego Chargers	W 21–17
4	October 10, 1971	at Cleveland Browns	L 27–17
5	October 18, 1971	at Kansas City Chiefs	L 38–16
6	October 24, 1971	Houston Oilers	W 23–16
7	October 31, 1971	at Baltimore Colts	L 34–21
8	November 7, 1971	Cleveland Browns	W 26–9
9	November 14, 1971	at Miami Dolphins	L 24–21
10	November 21, 1971	New York Giants	W 17–13
11	November 28, 1971	Denver Broncos	L 22–10
12	December 5, 1971	at Houston Oilers	L 29–3
13	December 12, 1971	at Cincinnati Bengals	W 21–13
14	December 19, 1971	Los Angeles Rams	L 23–14

=== Game summaries ===
==== Week 1 at Bears ====
Week One: Pittsburgh Steelers (0–0) at Chicago Bears (0–0)

Quarter	1	2	3	4	Total
Steelers	0	6	6	3	15
Bears	0	3	0	14	17

at Soldier Field, Chicago, Illinois

- Date: September 19, 1971
- Game time: 2:00 p.m.
- Game weather: 63 °F (17 °C)
- Game attendance: 55,049
- Referee: Bernie Ulman
- Pro-Football-Reference.com

Game information

Second quarter

- PIT – Preston Pearson fumble recovery in end zone (kick failed). Steelers 6–0. Drive:
- CHI – Mac Percival 33-yard field goal. Steelers 6–3. Drive:

Third quarter

- PIT – Roy Gerela 32-yard field goal. Steelers 9–3. Drive:
- PIT – Roy Gerela 29-yard field goal. Steelers 12–3. Drive:

Fourth quarter

- PIT – Roy Gerela 42-yard field goal. Steelers 15–3. Drive:
- CHI – Ross Brupbacher 30-yard fumble return (Mac Percival kick). Steelers 15–10.
- CHI – George Farmer 8-yard pass from Kent Nix (Mac Percival kick). Bears 17–15. Drive:

Top passers

- PIT – Terry Bradshaw – 10/24, 129 yards, 4 INT
- CHI – Jack Concannon – 15/26, 116 yards, INT

Top rushers

- PIT – John Fuqua – 17 rushes, 114 yards
- CHI – Don Shy – 9 rushes, 19 yards

Top receivers

- PIT – Ron Shanklin – 6 receptions, 113 yards
- CHI – George Farmer – 4 receptions, 59 yards, TD

==== Week 2 (Sunday September 26, 1971): Cincinnati Bengals ====
	1	2	3	4	Total
Bengals	3	0	7	0	10
Steelers	7	0	7	7	21

at Three Rivers Stadium, Pittsburgh, Pennsylvania

- Game time:
- Game weather:
- Game attendance: 48,448
- Referee: Norm Schachter
- TV announcers:

Scoring drives:

- Cincinnati – FG Muhlmann 33 – Bengals 3–0
- Pittsburgh – Smith 16 pass from Bradshaw (Gerela kick) – Steelers 7–3
- Cincinnati – Parrish 14 fumble return (Muhlmann kick) – Bengals 10–7
- Pittsburgh – Staggers 67 punt return (Gerela kick) – Steelers 14–10
- Pittsburgh – Pearson 13 pass from Bradshaw (Gerela kick) – Steelers 21–10

==== Week 3 (Sunday October 3, 1971): San Diego Chargers ====
	1	2	3	4	Total
Chargers	3	7	7	0	17
Steelers	7	0	7	7	21

at Three Rivers Stadium, Pittsburgh, Pennsylvania

- Game time:
- Game weather:
- Game attendance: 44,339
- Referee: Jim Tunney
- TV announcers:

Scoring drives:

- San Diego – FG Partee 21 – Chargers 3–0
- Pittsburgh – Fuqua 5 run (Gerela kick) – Steelers 7–3
- San Diego – Parks 16 pass from Hadl (Partee kick) – Chargers 10–7
- Pittsburgh – Fuqua 1 run (Gerela kick) – Steelers 14–10
- San Diego – Garrett 4 run (Partee kick) – Chargers 17–14
- Pittsburgh – Bradshaw 5 run (Gerela kick) – Steelers 21–17

Steelers stopped San Diego with a goal line stand, preserving the 21–17 win.

==== Week 4 (Sunday October 10, 1971): Cleveland Browns ====
	1	2	3	4	Total
Steelers	0	7	3	7	17
Browns	10	10	0	7	27

at Cleveland Municipal Stadium, Cleveland, Ohio

- Game time:
- Game weather:
- Game attendance: 83,391
- Referee: Jack Vest
- TV announcers:

Scoring drives:

- Cleveland – FG Cockroft 25 – Browns 3–0
- Cleveland – Morin 19 pass from Nelsen (Cockroft kick) – Browns 10–0
- Cleveland – Scott 18 run (Cockroft kick) – Browns 17–0
- Pittsburgh – D. Smith 22 pass from Bradshaw (Gerela kick) – Browns 17–7
- Cleveland – FG Cockroft 20 – Browns 20–7
- Pittsburgh – FG Gerela 33 – Browns 20–10
- Pittsburgh – Shanklin 11 pass from Bradshaw (Gerela kick) – Browns 20–17
- Cleveland – Kelly 7 run (Cockroft kick) – Browns 27–17

==== Week 5 (Monday October 18, 1971): Kansas City Chiefs ====
	1	2	3	4	Total
Steelers	9	0	0	7	16
Chiefs	0	28	0	10	38

at the Municipal Stadium, Kansas City, Missouri

- Game time:
- Game weather:
- Game attendance: 49,533
- Referee: Pat Haggerty
- TV announcers:ABC Howard Cosell, Frank Gifford, Don Meredith

Scoring drives:

- Pittsburgh – FG Gerela 32 – Steelers 3–0
- Pittsburgh – FG Gerela 40 – Steelers 6–0
- Pittsburgh – FG Gerela 35 – Steelers 9–0
- Kansas City – Taylor 5 pass from Dawson (Stenerud kick) – Steelers 9–7
- Kansas City – Taylor 27 pass from Dawson (Stenerud kick) – Chiefs 14–9
- Kansas City – Wright 5 pass from Dawson (Stenerud kick) – Chiefs 21–9
- Kansas City – Podolak 1 run (Stenerud kick) – Chiefs 28–9
- Kansas City – FG Stenerud 11 – Chiefs 31–9
- Pittsburgh – Fuqua 1 run (Gerela kick) – Chiefs 31–16
- Kansas City – Thomas 32 interception return (Stenerud kick) – Chiefs 38–16

==== Week 6 (Sunday October 24, 1971): Houston Oilers ====
	1	2	3	4	Total
Oilers	7	3	6	0	16
Steelers	3	3	3	14	23

at Three Rivers Stadium, Pittsburgh, Pennsylvania

- Game time:
- Game weather:
- Game attendance: 45,872
- Referee: Ben Dreith
- TV announcers:

Scoring drives:

- Houston – Dawkins 1 run (Moseley kick) – Oilers 7–0
- Pittsburgh – FG Gerela 28 – Oilers 7–3
- Houston – FG Moseley 24 – Oilers 10–3
- Pittsburgh – FG Gerela 22 – Oilers 10–6
- Houston – Dawkins 1 run (kick failed) – Oilers 16–6
- Pittsburgh – FG Gerela – Oilers 16–9
- Pittsburgh – Bradshaw 1 run (Gerela kick) – Tie 16–16
- Pittsburgh – Fuqua 30 run (Gerela kick) – Steelers 23–16

==== Week 7 (Sunday October 31, 1971): Baltimore Colts ====
	1	2	3	4	Total
Steelers	0	7	7	7	21
Colts	7	20	7	0	34

at Memorial Stadium, Baltimore, Maryland

- Game time:
- Game weather: 60,238
- Game attendance:
- Referee: Jack Reader
- TV announcers:

Scoring drives:

- Baltimore – Bulaich 1 run (O'Brien kick) – Colts 7–0
- Baltimore – FG O'Brien 20 – Colts 10–0
- Baltimore – FG O'Brien 9 – Colts 13–0
- Pittsburgh – Bradshaw 3 run (Gerela kick) – Colts 13–7
- Baltimore – Richardson 19 pass from Morrall (O'Brien kick) – Colts 20–7
- Baltimore – Richardson 49 pass from Morrall (O'Brien kick) – Colts 27–7
- Baltimore – Perkins 60 pass from Morrall (O'Brien kick) – Colts 34–7
- Pittsburgh – Shanklin 31 pass from Bradshaw (Gerela kick) – Colts 34–14
- Pittsburgh – Bradshaw 1 run (Gerela kick) – Colts 34–21

==== Week 8 (Sunday November 7, 1971): Cleveland Browns ====
	1	2	3	4	Total
Browns	0	2	7	0	9
Steelers	10	6	0	10	26

at Three Rivers Stadium, Pittsburgh, Pennsylvania

- Game time:
- Game weather:
- Game attendance: 50,202
- Referee: Fred Wyant
- TV announcers:

Scoring drives:

- Pittsburgh – FG Gerela 45 – Steelers 3–0
- Pittsburgh – Bradshaw 1 run (Gerela kick) – Steelers 10–0
- Pittsburgh – FG Gerela 23 – Steelers 13–0
- Pittsburgh – FG Gerela 17 – Steelers 16–0
- Cleveland – Safety, Houston tackled Walden in end zone – Steelers 16–2
- Cleveland – Scott 1 run (Cockroft kick) – Steelers 16–9
- Pittsburgh – FG Gerela 13 – Steelers 19–9
- Pittsburgh – Smith 40 pass from Hanratty (Gerela kick) – Steelers 26–9

==== Week 9 (Sunday November 14, 1971): Miami Dolphins ====
	1	2	3	4	Total
Steelers	14	7	0	0	21
Dolphins	3	14	7	0	24

at Miami Orange Bowl, Miami, Florida

- Game time:
- Game weather:
- Game attendance: 66,435
- Referee: Bob Frederic
- TV announcers:

Scoring drives:

- Miami – FG Yepremian 43 – Dolphins 3–0
- Pittsburgh – Smith 30 pass from Bradshaw (Gerela kick) – Steelers 7–3
- Pittsburgh – Shanklin 28 pass from Bradshaw (Gerela kick) – Steelers 14–3
- Pittsburgh – Smith 16 pass from Bradshaw (Gerela kick) – Steelers 21–3
- Miami – Warfield 12 pass from Griese (Yepremian kick) – Steelers 21–10
- Miami – Warfield 86 pass from Griese (Yepremian kick) – Steelers 21–17
- Miami – Warfield 60 pass from Griese (Yepremian kick) – Dolphins 24–21

==== Week 10 (Sunday November 21, 1971): New York Giants ====
	1	2	3	4	Total
Giants	7	6	0	0	13
Steelers	3	7	7	0	17

at Three Rivers Stadium, Pittsburgh, Pennsylvania

- Game time:
- Game weather:
- Game attendance: 50,008
- Referee: Fred Silva
- TV announcers:

Scoring drives:

- New York Giants – Houston 26 pass from Tarkenton (Gogolak kick) – Giants 7–0
- Pittsburgh – FG Gerela 25 – Giants 7–3
- New York Giants – FG Gogolak 25 – Giants 10–3
- Pittsburgh – Rowser 70 interception return (Gerela kick) – Tie 10–10
- New York Giants – FG Gogolak 29 – Giants 13–10
- Pittsburgh – Shanklin 4 pass from Bradshaw (Gerela kick) – Steelers 17–13

The Steelers ended a 15-game losing streak to NFC member teams.

==== Week 11 (Sunday November 28, 1971): Denver Broncos ====
	1	2	3	4	Total
Broncos	0	10	0	12	22
Steelers	0	0	10	0	10

at Three Rivers Stadium, Pittsburgh, Pennsylvania

- Game time:
- Game weather:
- Game attendance: 39,710
- Referee: Tommy Bell
- TV announcers:

Scoring drives:

- Denver – Little 3 run (J. Turner kick) – Broncos 7–0
- Denver – FG J. Turner 32 – Broncos 10–0
- Pittsburgh – Pearson 8 pass from Hanratty (Gerela kick) – Broncos 10–7
- Pittsburgh – FG Gerela 19 – Tie 10–10
- Denver – Little 16 run (Turner kick) – Broncos 17–10
- Denver – Safety, Lynch tackled Walden in end zone – Broncos 19–10
- Denver – FG J. Turner 12 – Broncos 22–10

==== Week 12 (Sunday December 5, 1971): Houston Oilers ====
	1	2	3	4	Total
Steelers	0	3	0	0	3
Oilers	16	6	0	7	29

at the Houston Astrodome, Houston, Texas

- Game time:
- Game weather:
- Game attendance: 37,778
- Referee: Fred Swearingen
- TV announcers:

Scoring drives:

- Houston – Reed 27 pass from Pastorini (Moseley kick) – Oilers 7–0
- Houston – FG Moseley 25 – Oilers 10–0
- Houston – Campbell 8 run (kick blocked) – Oilers 16–0
- Houston – FG Moseley 37 – Oilers 19–0
- Houston – FG Moseley 25 – Oilers 22–0
- Pittsburgh – FG Gerela 15 – Oilers 22–3
- Houston – Holmes 4 run (Moselely kick) – Oilers 29–3

==== Week 13 (Sunday December 12, 1971): Cincinnati Bengals ====
	1	2	3	4	Total
Steelers	7	0	14	0	21
Bengals	0	7	6	0	13

at Riverfront Stadium, Cincinnati

- Game time:
- Game weather:
- Game attendance: 60,022
- Referee: Jack Vest
- TV announcers:

Scoring drives:

- Pittsburgh – Hanratty 3 run (Gerela kick) – Steelers 7–0
- Cincinnati – Coslet 43 pass from Carter (Muhlmann kick) – Tie 7–7
- Cincinnati – FG Muhlmann 22 – Bengals 10–7
- Cincinnati – FG Muhlmann 18 – Bengals 13–7
- Pittsburgh – Fuqua 40 pass from Bradshaw (Gerela kick) – Steelers 14–13
- Pittsburgh – Shanklin 5 pass from Bradshaw (Gerela kick) – Steelers 21–13

==== Week 14 (Sunday December 19, 1971): Los Angeles Rams ====
	1	2	3	4	Total
Rams	13	3	7	0	23
Steelers	0	7	7	0	14

at Three Rivers Stadium, Pittsburgh, Pennsylvania

- Game time:
- Game weather:
- Game attendance: 45,233
- Referee: Pat Haggerty
- TV announcers:

Scoring drives:

- Los Angeles – FG Ray 15 – Rams 3–0
- Los Angeles – FG Ray 15 – Rams 6–0
- Los Angeles – Snow 20 pass from Gabriel (Ray kick) – Rams 13–0
- Pittsburgh – L. Brown 3 pass from Bradshaw (Gerela kick) – Rams 13–7
- Los Angeles – FG Ray 15 – Rams 16–7
- Pittsburgh – Shanklin 2 pass from Bradshaw (Gerela kick) – Rams 16–14
- Los Angeles – L. Smith 1 run (Ray kick) – Rams 23–14

=== Standings ===
AFC Central
	W	L	T	PCT	DIV	CONF	PF	PA	STK
Cleveland Browns	9	5	0	.643	5–1	7–4	285	273	W5
Pittsburgh Steelers	6	8	0	.429	4–2	5–6	246	292	L1
Houston Oilers	4	9	1	.308	2–4	4–7	251	330	W3
Cincinnati Bengals	4	10	0	.286	1–5	3–8	284	265	L3

Note: Tie games were not officially counted in the standings until 1972.
