= Pittsburgh Steelers All-Time Team =

Anniversary selection of Pittsburgh Steelers best players

The Pittsburgh Steelers All-Time Team was named as a part of the franchise's 75th season celebration in 2007. The club's top 33 players were selected in commemoration of the franchise's founding in 1933. The team was chosen on the basis of fan voting.

This All-Time team supplants the previous All-Time team which was named in 1982 as a part of the club's 50th season celebration. The 50th season team included only 24 players, all of whom are included on this team except guards Gerry Mullins and Sam Davis, safety Mike Wagner and kickers Roy Gerela and Pat Brady.

The club announced the Steelers Legends team concurrently with this All-Time team. The Legends team compensates for the bias toward players who performed in the post-1970 era — it represents the best players in the franchise's pre-1970 history.

== Offense ==
Position	Jersey No.	Player	Years on Team	# of Pro Bowls	Hall of Fame	Honors	Ref.
Quarterback	12	Terry Bradshaw	1970–1983	3	Yes	1978 NFL MVP	
Running back	36	Jerome Bettis	1996–2005	6	Yes	1993 Off. Rookie of the Year	
Running back	20	Rocky Bleier	1968, 1971–1980	-	No		
Running back	32^{[c]}	Franco Harris	1972–1983	9	Yes	1972 Off. Rookie of the Year	
Wide receiver	82	John Stallworth	1974–1987	4	Yes	1984 Comeback Player of the Year	
Wide receiver	88	Lynn Swann	1974–1982	3	Yes	Super Bowl X MVP	
Wide receiver	86	Hines Ward	1998–2011	4	No	Super Bowl XL MVP	
Tight end	89	Bennie Cunningham	1976–1985	-	No		
Tight end	83	Elbie Nickel	1947–1957	3	No		
Tackle	79	Larry Brown	1971–1984	1	No		
Center	63	Dermontti Dawson	1988–2000	7	Yes	1990s All-Decade Team	
Center	52	Mike Webster	1974–1988	9	Yes	NFL All-Time team	
Guard	66	Alan Faneca	1998–2007	9	Yes	2000s All-Decade Team	
Tackle	62	Tunch Ilkin	1980–1992	2	No		
Tackle	55	Jon Kolb	1969–1981	-	No		

== Defense ==
Position	Jersey No.	Player	Years on Team	# of Pro Bowls	Hall of Fame	Honors	Ref.
Defensive tackle	75^{[c]}	Joe Greene	1969–1981	10	Yes	NFL All-Time team	
Nose tackle	98	Casey Hampton	2001–2012	5	No		
Defensive tackle	70^{[c]}	Ernie Stautner	1950–1963	9	Yes	1950s All-Decade Team	
Defensive end	78	Dwight White	1971–1980	2	No		
Defensive end	68	L. C. Greenwood	1969–1981	6	No	1970s All-Decade Team	
Linebacker	59	Jack Ham	1971–1982	8	Yes	NFL All-Time team	
Linebacker	58	Jack Lambert	1974–1984	9	Yes	NFL All-Time team	
Linebacker	95	Greg Lloyd	1988–1997	5	No	1994 AFC Def. Player of the Year	
Linebacker	55	Joey Porter	1999–2006	4	No		
Linebacker	34	Andy Russell	1963–1976	7	No		
Cornerback	47	Mel Blount	1970–1983	5	Yes	NFL All-Time team	
Cornerback	80	Jack Butler	1951–1959	4	Yes	1950s All-Decade Team	
Cornerback	37	Carnell Lake	1989–1998	5	No	1990s All-Decade Team	
Safety	43	Troy Polamalu	2003–2014	8	Yes	2000s All-Decade Team	
Safety	31	Donnie Shell	1974–1987	5	Yes	College Football Hall of Fame	
Defensive back	26	Rod Woodson	1987–1996	11	Yes	NFL All-Time team	

== Specialists ==
Position	Jersey No.	Player	Years on Team	# of Pro Bowls	Hall of Fame	Honors	Ref.
Kicker	1	Gary Anderson	1982–1994	4	No	1980s & 1990s All-Decade Team	
Punter	39	Bobby Walden	1968–1977	1	No		

== Notes ==
Names in bold indicates the player spent his entire playing career with the Steelers.
^{a} Not yet eligible
^{b} Finalist in 2009, 2010 & 2011
^{c} Number retired by team
^{d} Finalist in 2002
