= List of Arkansas–Pine Bluff Golden Lions in the NFL draft =

This is a list of Arkansas-Pine Bluff Golden Lions football players in the NFL draft.

== Key ==
B	Back	K	Kicker	NT	Nose tackle
C	Center	LB	Linebacker	FB	Fullback
DB	Defensive back	P	Punter	HB	Halfback
DE	Defensive end	QB	Quarterback	WR	Wide receiver
DT	Defensive tackle	RB	Running back	G	Guard
E	End	T	Offensive tackle	TE	Tight end

== Selections ==
Year	Round	Pick	Overall	Player	Team	Position	Notes
1965	12	10	164	Gene Jeter	Green Bay Packers	RB	
1966	10	5	145	Caesar Belser	Washington Redskins	DB	Super Bowl IV Champion
1967	5	11	118	Willie Parker	Houston Oilers	DT	
1968	6	25	163	Charles Williams	Cincinnati Bengals	RB	
1968	14	6	360	Donald Evans	Minnesota Vikings	T	
1969	3	10	62	Ed Cross	Washington Redskins	RB	
1969	10	4	238	L. C. Greenwood	Pittsburgh Steelers	DE	6× Pro Bowl (1973, 1974, 1975, 1976, 1978, 1979); 2x All-Pro (1974, 1975); NFL All-Decade (1970s); Super Bowl IX, X, XIII, XIV Champion
1969	11	4	264	Clarence Washington	Pittsburgh Steelers	DT	
1969	12	18	304	Jim White	San Diego Chargers	RB	
1969	13	6	323	Amos Ayres	Miami Dolphins	DB	
1969	17	24	440	Billy Austin	Oakland Raiders	TE	
1970	5	10	114	Manny Sistrunk	Washington Redskins	DT	
1972	12	5	291	Tommy Gay	St. Louis Cardinals	DT	
1972	16	8	398	Charles Burrell	Green Bay Packers	DT	
1973	4	21	99	Terry Nelson	Los Angeles Rams	TE	
1977	7	25	192	Ken Smith	New England Patriots	WR	
1980	9	28	249	Ron McCall	Pittsburgh Steelers	WR	
1984u	2	8	36	Mike McInnis	Atlanta Falcons	DT	
1991	7	4	171	Ivory Lee Brown	Phoenix Cardinals	RB	
1991	10	12	262	Rapier Porter	Green Bay Packers	TE	
1999	7	6	212	Chris Akins	Green Bay Packers	DB	Super Bowl XXXVIII Champion
2000	3	23	85	Gregory Wesley	Kansas City Chiefs	DB	
2000	6	1	167	Ernest Grant	Miami Dolphins	DT	
2002	4	2	100	Dante Wesley	Carolina Panthers	DB	
2003	3	16	80	Courtney Van Buren	San Diego Chargers	G	
2013	3	13	75	Terron Armstead	New Orleans Saints	T	5× Pro Bowl (2018, 2019, 2020, 2022, 2023); All-Pro (2018)
