= Vinyard =

Vinyard may refer to:

- Vineyard
- Ken Vinyard (born 1947), American football player
- Derek Vinyard, main character in the 1998 film American History X
