= Allan Watson (American football) =

Welsh gridiron football player (1944–2024)

No. 14
- Position: Placekicker

Personal information
- Born: November 5, 1942; Newport, Wales
- Died: March 1, 2024 (aged 81); Calcutta, Ohio, U.S.
- Listed height: 5 ft 9 in (1.75 m)
- Listed weight: 162 lb (73 kg)

Career information
- High school: Blackwood (Wales)
- College: University of Wales, Newport

Career history
- Association football (soccer): Pittsburgh Phantoms (1967); American football: Dallas Cowboys (1968)*; Ohio Valley Ironmen (1969); Pittsburgh Steelers (1970–1971); Youngstown Hardhats (1972–1974); Chicago Fire (1974); Chicago Winds (1975)
- * Offseason or practice squad member only

Career statistics
- Games played: 4
- Field goals made: 5
- Field goals attempted: 10
- Stats at Pro Football Reference

Allan Watson (November 5, 1942 – March 1, 2024) was a Welsh gridiron football player.

Born on November 5, 1942, in Wales, Watson attended school in Blackwood, Caerphilly. He later attended the Newport College of Technology, part of the University of Wales, Newport, receiving a degree in metallurgy. He moved to the U.S. in 1967 to work for a crucible steel business in Pittsburgh, Pennsylvania. He grew up playing association football (soccer) and tried out for the local Pittsburgh Phantoms of the short-lived National Professional Soccer League (NPSL), making the team while appearing in three matches as an inside forward.

Watson was introduced to American football by a close friend and began practicing to be a placekicker after the Phantoms folded in late 1967. He attended a kicking camp hosted by the Dallas Cowboys and run by Ben Agajanian; Watson performed well enough to be signed by the team. He only appeared in preseason for the team and later requested a release. He tried out for the Pittsburgh Steelers in 1969 and received a contract, later being sent to the Ohio Valley Ironmen of the Continental Football League (CoFL). He was 7-of-20 on field goal attempts and made all 32 of his extra point attempts with the Ironmen, scoring a total of 53 points while having a long of 41 yards.

After returning to the Steelers in 1970, Watson played through preseason but was ultimately released in favor of Gene Mingo; however, after Mingo struggled late in the season, Watson was re-signed and played in the final four games. He made 5-of-10 field goal attempts and converted 7-of-8 extra point tries, scoring 22 points while his longest kick was 45 yards. He was released prior to the 1971 season in favor of Roy Gerela.

After his stint with the Steelers, Watson played from 1972 to 1974 with the Youngstown Hardhats of the Midwest Football League (MFL), setting league records with a 56-yard field goal and 90-yard punt. He joined the Chicago Fire of the World Football League (WFL) in 1974, making 4-of-7 field goal attempts including a league-record 53-yard kick. He then played for their WFL successor, the Chicago Winds, in 1975, before retiring.

Watson was married. He died on March 1, 2024, at the age of 81.

== NFL statistics ==
Year	Team	GP	Field goals									Extra points			Total points
Year	Team	GP	FGM	FGA	FG%	<20	20−29	30−39	40−49	50+	Lng	XPM	XPA	XP%	Total points
1970	PIT	4	5	10	50.0	2-2	2-2	0-1	1-4	0-1	45	7	8	87.5	22
Total		4	5	10	50.0	2-2	2-2	0-1	1-4	0-1	45	7	8	87.5	22
