= Fred Barry =

American football player (1948–2016)

No. 29
- Position: Cornerback

Personal information
- Born: July 31, 1948; Washington, Pennsylvania, U.S.
- Died: August 16, 2016 (aged 68)
- Listed height: 5 ft 10 in (1.78 m)
- Listed weight: 184 lb (83 kg)

Career information
- College: Boston University
- NFL draft: 1970: 8th round, 193rd overall pick

Career history
- Pittsburgh Steelers (1970)

Career NFL statistics
- Games: 9
- Fumble recoveries: 2
- Stats at Pro Football Reference

Frederick Barry (July 31, 1948 – August 16, 2016) was a professional American football cornerback in the National Football League (NFL). Barry played nine games for the 1970 Pittsburgh Steelers.
