= Clancy Oliver =

American football player (born 1947)

No. 27, 20, 48
- Positions: Cornerback, Safety

Personal information
- Born: November 17, 1947 (age 78); Bakersfield, California, U.S.
- Listed height: 6 ft 1 in (1.85 m)
- Listed weight: 183 lb (83 kg)

Career information
- High school: Laguna Beach (Laguna Beach, California)
- College: San Diego State (1967-1968)
- NFL draft: 1969: undrafted

Career history
- Pittsburgh Steelers (1969–1970); Oakland Raiders (1971)*; San Diego Chargers (1972)*; St. Louis Cardinals (1973); Portland Storm/Thunder (1974-1975)
- * Offseason or practice squad member only

Career NFL statistics
- Fumble recoveries: 1
- Stats at Pro Football Reference

Clarence H. Oliver (born November 17, 1947) is an American former professional football player who was a cornerback in the National Football League (NFL). He played college football for the San Diego State Aztecs. In the NFL, he played for the Pittsburgh Steelers from 1969 to 1970 and the St. Louis Cardinals in 1973.

== Early life and college ==
Born in Bakersfield, California, Oliver graduated from Laguna Beach High School in Laguna Beach, California. In high school, Oliver made an 89-yard fumble return in 1964 for a record that would only be broken in 2011. Oliver began his college football career at Orange Coast College, a junior college in Costa Mesa, California. Oliver transferred to San Diego State College (now University), where he played for the Aztecs in 1967 and 1968. San Diego State finished no. 1 in the AP small college poll in 1967 and no. 2 in the same poll in 1968.

== Professional career ==
Oliver was not selected in the 1969 NFL/AFL draft. He began his career with the Pittsburgh Steelers, where he played at cornerback and free safety in the 1969 and 1970 seasons donning jersey no. 27 playing in the cornerback and free safety positions. In 23 games with the Steelers, Oliver had nine starts and one fumble recovery.

On July 31, 1971, the Oakland Raiders signed Oliver off waivers from the Steelers. The Raiders released Oliver prior to the regular season. The San Diego Chargers signed Oliver in 1972, but Oliver missed the season due to injury. The Chargers released Oliver in August 1973, and the St. Louis Cardinals signed Oliver on November 8, 1973. Oliver would play in two games at safety for the Cardinals in the 1973 season with jersey no. 20.

After leaving the Cardinals, Oliver signed with the Portland Storm (later Thunder) of the World Football League. Wearing jersey no. 48, Oliver played in 18 games in total with the Portland WFL team, seven with the Storm in 1974 and 11 with the Thunder in 1975. Oliver had four kickoff returns for 72 yards in 1974 and three interceptions for nine yards in 1975.

== Life after football ==
Oliver returned to Orange Coast College in 1993 as tight ends coach.

In the 2019 NFL draft, the Jacksonville Jaguars selected Oliver's nephew Josh Oliver, a tight end.
