= Rick Sharp =

American football player (1948–2026)

No. 73, 75
- Position: Tackle

Personal information
- Born: June 1, 1948; Ealing, England, UK
- Died: August 28, 2026 (aged 78); Pappinbarra, New South Wales, Australia
- Listed height: 6 ft 4 in (1.93 m)
- Listed weight: 265 lb (120 kg)

Career information
- High school: Queen Anne (Seattle, Washington, U.S.)
- College: Washington
- NFL draft: 1970: 12th round, 288th overall pick

Career history
- Pittsburgh Steelers (1970–1971); Denver Broncos (1972)

Career NFL statistics
- Games played: 29
- Returns: 1
- Return yards: 9
- Stats at Pro Football Reference

Vaughan Richard "Rick" Sharp (June 1, 1948 – August 28, 2026) was an England-born former professional American football tackle who played three seasons in the National Football League (NFL) with the Pittsburgh Steelers and Denver Broncos.

Born in a suburb of London and raised in Seattle, Sharp graduated from Queen Anne High School in 1966. He played college football nearby at the University of Washington and was a three-year starter for the Huskies under head coach Jim Owens. Sharp majored in business and was a member of Phi Delta Theta fraternity.

In the 1970 NFL draft, he was selected by the Pittsburgh Steelers in the twelfth round (288th overall); they had earlier taken quarterback Terry Bradshaw with the first overall pick. Sharp appeared in all fourteen games as a rookie, but incurred a knee injury in 1971; after the first week of the 1972 season, Sharp was traded to Denver Broncos for an undisclosed draft pick. He played in the World Football League (WFL) in 1974 with the New York Stars.

After his playing career, Sharp was a certified public accountant (CPA) and worked in public accounting and finance in Seattle; after a vacation to Australia in 1985, he decided to relocate to Sydney the following year. He died in New South Wales at age 78 on August 28, 2026.
