= Erwin Williams =

American football player (1947–2025)

- Williams, circa 1969

No. 43, 81
- Position: Split end

Personal information
- Born: June 21, 1947; Norfolk, Virginia, U.S.
- Died: August 30, 2025 (aged 78); Portsmouth, Virginia, U.S.
- Listed height: 6 ft 5 in (1.96 m)
- Listed weight: 214 lb (97 kg)

Career information
- High school: Crestwood (Chesapeake, Virginia)
- College: Maryland State
- NFL draft: 1969: undrafted

Career history
- Pittsburgh Steelers (1969); Norfolk Neptunes (1971); New York Stars (1974)*
- * Offseason or practice squad member only

Awards and highlights
- ACFL champion (1971)
- Stats at Pro Football Reference

Erwin Berlin Williams (June 21, 1947 – August 30, 2025) was an American professional football split end who played for the Pittsburgh Steelers of the National Football League (NFL). He played college football for the Maryland State Hawks.

== Early life ==
Erwin Berlin Williams was born on June 21, 1947, in Norfolk, Virginia. He attended Crestwood High School in Chesapeake, Virginia, and graduated in 1965.

== College career ==
Williams enrolled at Maryland State College to play college football for the Hawks as a split end. He played for the varsity team from 1965 to 1968. He led the Central Intercollegiate Athletic Association in receptions as a senior in 1968, catching 44 passes for four touchdowns. Williams finished his college career with 274 total receptions. He also played college basketball for the Hawks.

== Professional career ==
After going undrafted in the 1969 NFL/AFL draft, Williams signed with the Pittsburgh Steelers on February 5, 1969. He was waived on August 1 during training camp, and placed on the team's taxi squad. He was later promoted to the active roster and played in nine games during the 1969 season in a reserve role, catching three passes for 14 yards and one touchdown. Williams was released on August 10, 1970, after the first game of the 1970 preseason.

Williams played for the Norfolk Neptunes of the Atlantic Coast Football League (ACFL) in 1971, helping them win the ACFL title.

Williams signed with the New York Stars of the upstart World Football League on May 9, 1974. He was released on June 20, 1974, several weeks before the start of the regular season.

== Personal life ==
Williams was a Sunday school teacher. He died at his home in Portsmouth, Virginia, on August 30, 2025.
