= Rocky Bleier =

American football player (born 1946)

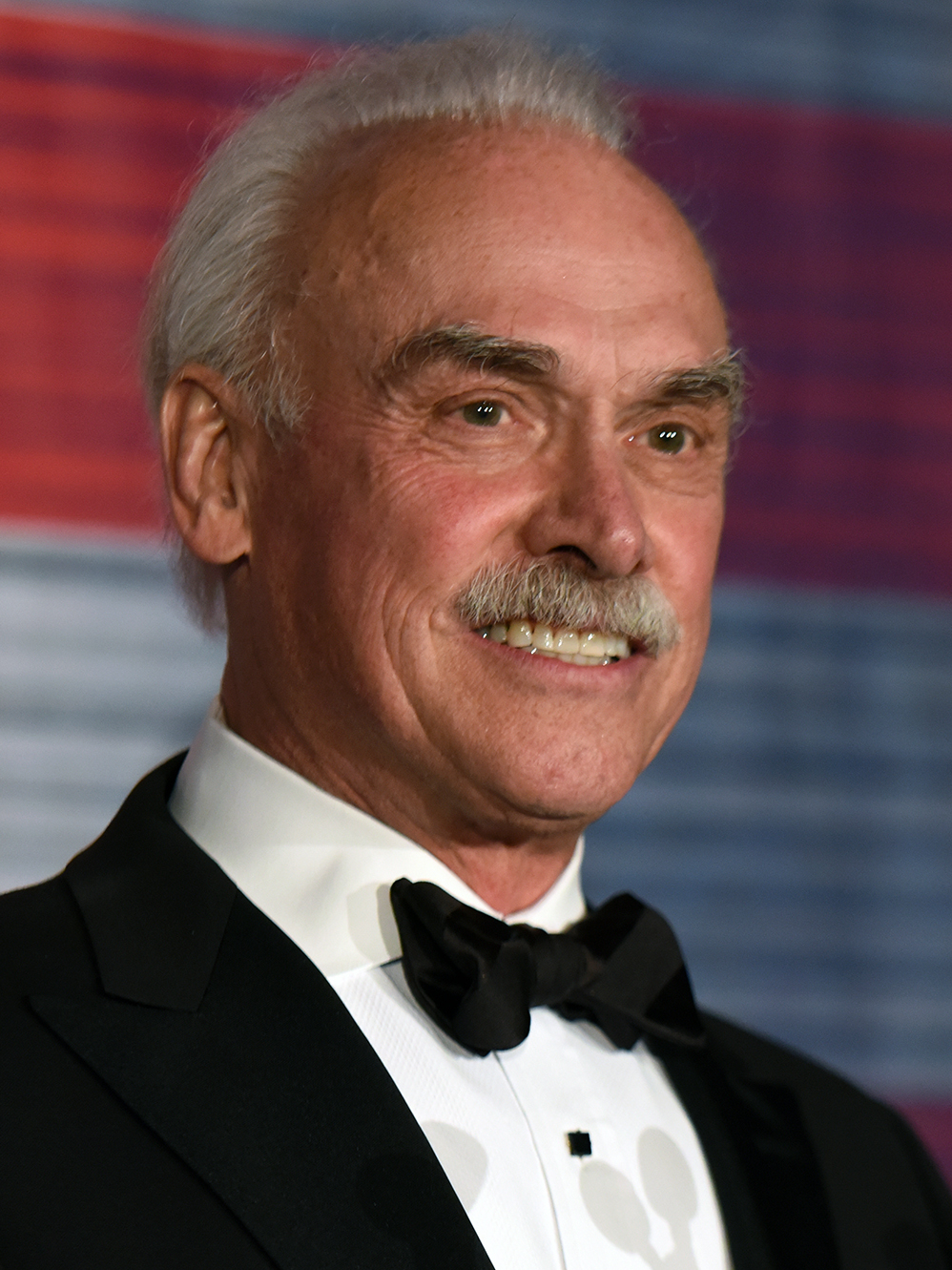
- Bleier in 2017

No. 26, 20
- Position: Running back

Personal information
- Born: March 5, 1946 (age 80); Appleton, Wisconsin, U.S.
- Listed height: 5 ft 11 in (1.80 m)
- Listed weight: 210 lb (95 kg)

Career information
- High school: Xavier (Appleton)
- College: Notre Dame (1965–1967)
- NFL draft: 1968: 16th round, 417th overall pick

Career history
- Pittsburgh Steelers (1968; 1970–1980)

Awards and highlights
- 4× Super Bowl champion (IX, X, XIII, XIV); George Halas Award (1975); Pittsburgh Steelers All-Time Team; Pittsburgh Steelers Hall of Honor; National champion (1966); International Sports Hall of Fame (2019); NCAA Inspiration Award (2020)

Career NFL statistics
- Rushing yards: 3,865
- Rushing average: 4.2
- Total touchdowns: 23
- Rushing attempts: 928
- Military career
- Allegiance: United States of America
- Branch: United States Army
- Service years: 1968–1970
- Rank: Specialist 4
- Units: Company C, 4th Battalion (Light), 31st Infantry Regiment, 196th Light Infantry Brigade, Americal Division
- Conflicts: Vietnam War
- Awards: Bronze Star Medal; Purple Heart; Combat Infantryman Badge
- Other work: author, actor, motivational speaker
- Stats at Pro Football Reference

Robert Patrick "Rocky" Bleier (/ˈblaɪər/ BLY-ər, born March 5, 1946) is an American former professional football player and a veteran of the United States Army. He played as a running back in the National Football League (NFL) for the Pittsburgh Steelers in 1968 and from 1970 to 1980.

== Origin of nickname ==
Nicknamed "Rocky" as a baby, Bleier said, "As the first born of the family, my dad was proud, as all parents are. And the guys would come into the bar and say 'Bob, how's that new kid of yours?' And my dad would go, 'Aw, you should see him, guys, looks like a little rock sitting in that crib. He's got all these muscles.' So they'd come back in the bar and they'd say, 'Hey Bob, how's that little rock of yours?' So after that, that's how I got it. It stuck."

== Early life ==
Born and raised in Appleton, Wisconsin, Bleier was the oldest of four children of Bob and Ellen Bleier, who ran a tavern, Bleier's Bar, while the family of six lived above it. He had a paper route as a youth, and graduated from Xavier High School in 1964, where he starred in football and basketball. In football, Bleier was a three-time all-state selection as running back, and won all-conference honors at both linebacker and defensive back. He was a team captain in football, basketball, and track.

Bleier played college football at the University of Notre Dame in South Bend, Indiana, and graduated in 1968 with a degree in business management. During his junior season in 1966, the Fighting Irish won the national championship and he was a team captain as a senior in 1967. He was selected in the 16th round of the 1968 NFL/AFL draft by the Pittsburgh Steelers, 417th overall.

== Military service ==
After his rookie season with the Steelers, Bleier was drafted into the U.S. Army on December 4, 1968, during the Vietnam War. He volunteered for duty in South Vietnam and shipped out for Vietnam in May 1969 assigned to Company C, 4th Battalion (Light), 31st Infantry Regiment (Pro Patria), 196th Light Infantry Brigade (Ahead of the Rest) (Chargers), Americal Division, and assigned as a squad grenadier operating a 40mm M79 grenade launcher. His rank was Specialist 4.

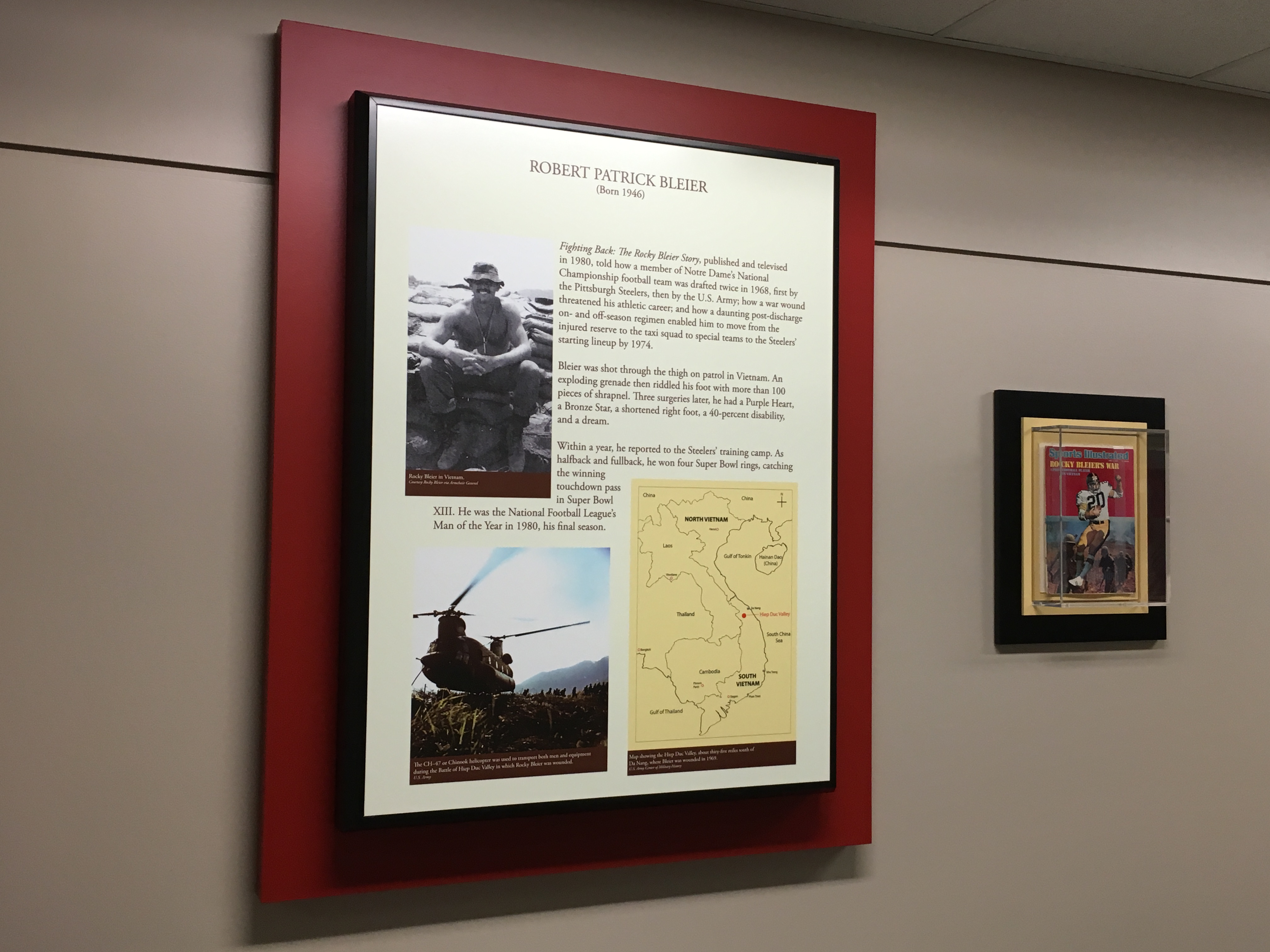
Bleier's military service is commemorated in the Pentagon's Wounded Warrior corridor

On August 20, while on patrol in Hiep Duc, Bleier was wounded in the left thigh by an enemy rifle bullet when his platoon was ambushed in a rice paddy. While he was down, an enemy grenade landed nearby after bouncing off a fellow soldier, he tried to leap over it and it exploded, sending shrapnel into his lower right leg. His right foot was severely damaged in the blast as well. He was later awarded the Bronze Star and Purple Heart.

While he was recovering in a hospital in Tokyo, doctors told him he should not expect to ever play football again. Soon after, he received a postcard from Steelers owner Art Rooney which simply read "Rock - the team's not doing well. We need you. Art Rooney". Bleier later said, "When you have somebody take the time and interest to send you a postcard, something that they didn't have to do, you have a special place for those kinds of people". After several surgeries, he was discharged from the Army in July 1970, and began informal workouts with Steeler teammates.

== NFL career ==
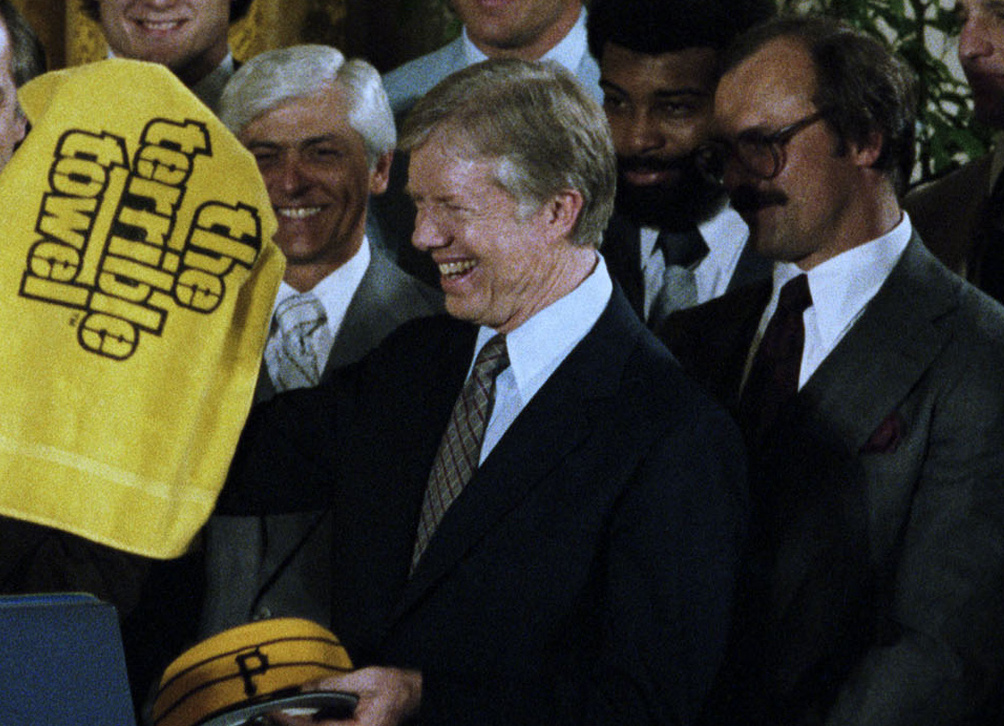
President Jimmy Carter and Bleier following the Steelers' Super Bowl XIV victory

Bleier rejoined the Steelers in camp in 1970. Upon his return, he couldn't walk without being in pain, and weighed only 180 pounds (82 kg). He was put on injured reserve for the season, but returned in 1971 and played on special teams. He spent several seasons trying to get increased playing time, and was waived on two occasions. But Bleier never gave up, and said that he worked hard so that "some time in the future you didn't have to ask yourself 'what if?'". An offseason training regimen brought Bleier back to 212 lb (96 kg) in the summer of 1974, and he earned a spot in the Steelers' starting lineup.

Since Preston Pearson was wearing number 26 (the number Bleier wore his rookie season before he went to Vietnam), Bleier switched to number 20 when he returned to the team. After Pearson was traded to the Dallas Cowboys in 1975, Bleier kept the number 20, with which he had become associated.

In addition to being a great lead blocker, Bleier was the second of the Steelers' rushing weapons (Franco Harris was the primary back), but was effective nonetheless at both blocking and rushing. In 1976, both Harris and Bleier rushed for over 1,000 yards, making this the second NFL team to accomplish this feat, after Mercury Morris and Larry Csonka of the 1972 Miami Dolphins.

Bleier played in the first four Steeler Super Bowl victories, and caught the touchdown pass from Terry Bradshaw that gave Pittsburgh a lead it would never relinquish in Super Bowl XIII. He also recovered Dallas's onside kick in the closing seconds, sealing the Steelers' victory.

Bleier retired after the 1980 season, with 3,865 rushing yards, 136 receptions for 1,294 yards, and 25 touchdowns. At the time of his retirement, he was the Steelers' fourth all-time leading rusher.

== NFL career statistics ==
Legend
	Won the Super Bowl
**Bold**	Career high

Year	Team	Games		Rushing					Receiving				
Year	Team	GP	GS	Att	Yds	Avg	Lng	TD	Rec	Yds	Avg	Lng	TD
1968	PIT	10	0	6	39	6.5	21	0	3	68	**22.7**	**54**	0
1969	PIT	0	0	Did not play due to service in Vietnam War									
1970	PIT	0	0	Did not play due to injury									
1971	PIT	6	0	0	0	0	0	0	0	0	0	0	0
1972	PIT	14	0	1	17	**17.0**	17	0	0	0	0	0	0
1973	PIT	12	0	3	0	0	1	0	0	0	0	0	0
1974	PIT	12	7	88	373	4.2	18	2	7	87	12.4	24	0
1975	PIT	11	11	140	528	3.8	17	2	15	65	4.3	13	0
1976	PIT	14	14	**220**	**1,036**	4.7	28	**5**	24	**294**	12.3	32	0
1977	PIT	13	13	135	465	3.4	16	4	18	161	8.9	30	0
1978	PIT	16	16	165	633	3.8	24	**5**	17	168	9.9	32	**1**
1979	PIT	16	7	92	434	4.7	**70**	4	**31**	277	8.9	28	0
1980	PIT	16	6	78	340	4.4	19	1	21	174	8.3	17	**1**
Career		140	74	928	3,865	4.2	70	23	136	1,294	9.5	54	2

== Off the field ==
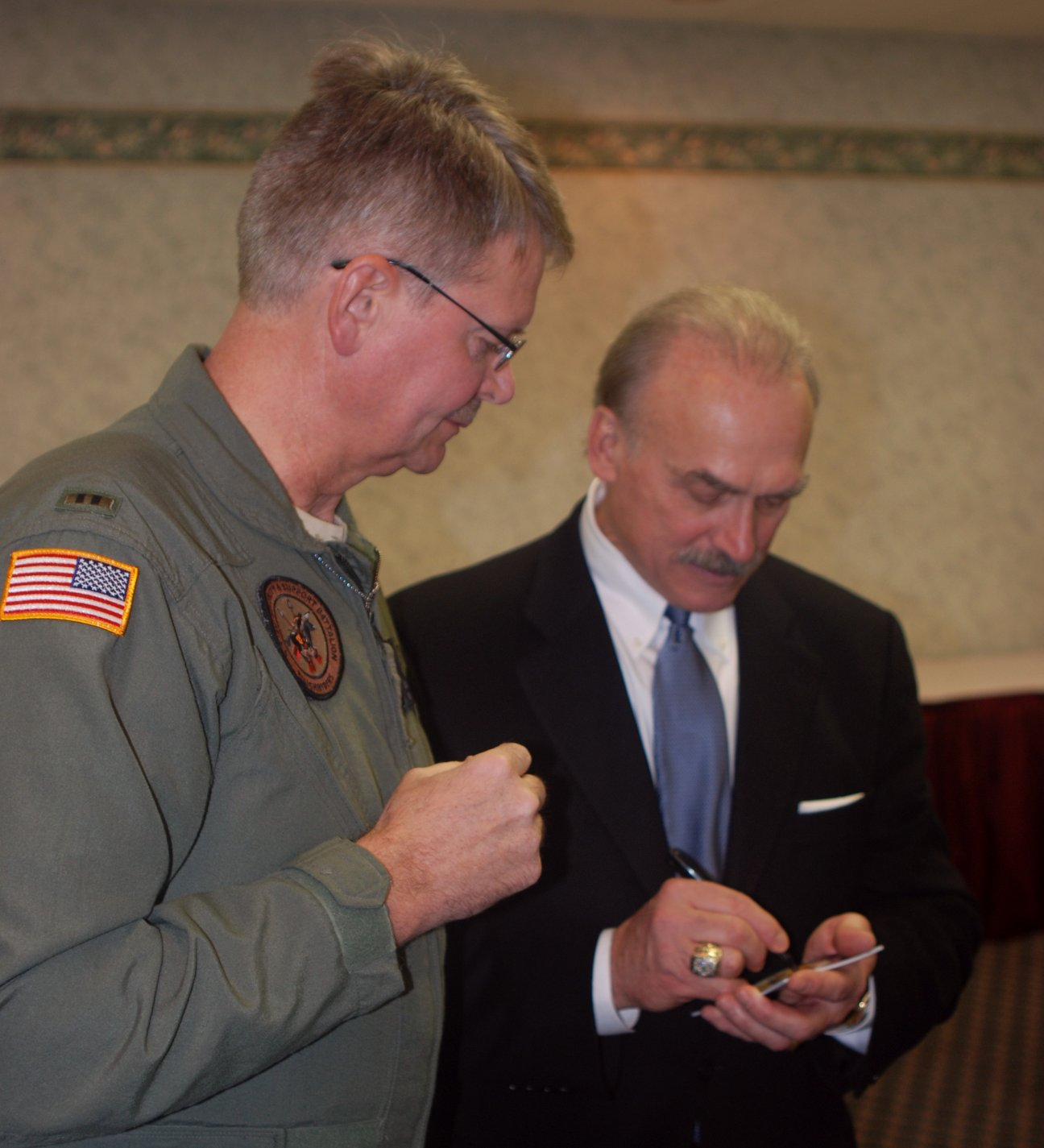
Bleier signs an autograph at the North Dakota National Guard's 2009 Safety Conference in Bismarck.

Bleier wrote a book about his struggle to recover from his war wounds called Fighting Back: The Rocky Bleier Story, and it was made into a television movie in 1980 with Robert Urich starring as Bleier, Richard Herd as Steelers coach Chuck Noll, Art Carney as team owner Art Rooney, and many of Bleier's teammates including Matt Bahr and "Mean Joe" Greene as themselves. Bleier is featured in the 2014 feature documentary "Project 22", which chronicles the cross-country motorcycle journey of two young veterans exploring alternative treatments for PTSD and TBI.

Bleier has four children. He has two children from his marriage with Aleta Giacobine Whitaker, from whom he was divorced in October 1996. He also has two adopted children with his second wife, Jan Gyurina. As of 2011, he lived in Mt. Lebanon, Pennsylvania.

Bleier has become an author and speaker on retirement and financial management. He has authored the book Don't Fumble Your Retirement and is the co-host of a weekly radio show The Rock on Retirement on Pittsburgh radio station 104.7 FM WPGB. He runs Bleier Zagula Financial with his business partner Matt Zagula.

== Honors ==
The football stadium at Xavier High School was renamed Rocky Bleier Field on the Knights of Columbus Sports Complex on October 12, 2007. Bleier tossed the coin to start the high school football game that evening. He had spoken earlier in the day to students at an assembly. The entire student body wore T-shirts with his number 23, the only number retired in the school's history. On the following day, the third day of a three-day event, mayor Tim Hanna unveiled a street named in his honor. The former Oneida Court was renamed Rocky Bleier Run. In 2017, Bleier became the subject of a children's book called “Rock Solid-The Courageous Journey of Rocky Bleier.” The story was written and illustrated by Pittsburgh artist Larry Klu. In 2019, he was inducted into the International Sports Hall of Fame.
