= Jon Henderson =

American football player (born 1944)

No. 24, 28
- Positions: Wide receiver, Defensive back

Personal information
- Born: December 17, 1944 (age 81); Pittsburgh, Pennsylvania, U.S.
- Listed height: 6 ft 0 in (1.83 m)
- Listed weight: 200 lb (91 kg)

Career information
- High school: Westinghouse (Pittsburgh)
- College: Colorado State
- NFL draft: 1968: 3rd round, 61st overall pick

Career history
- Pittsburgh Steelers (1968–1969); Washington Redskins (1970); Calgary Stampeders (1971)

Awards and highlights
- Grey Cup champion (1971)

Career NFL statistics
- Receptions: 28
- Receiving yards: 390
- Touchdowns: 6
- Stats at Pro Football Reference

Jon Elliott Henderson (born December 17, 1944) is an American former professional football player who was a wide receiver in the National Football League (NFL) for the Pittsburgh Steelers and the Washington Redskins. He also played one season in the Canadian Football League (CFL) for the Calgary Stampeders and helped them to win the Grey Cup in 1971. Henderson played college football for the Colorado State Rams and was selected 61st overall in the third round of the 1968 NFL/AFL draft.

He served as the Steelers primary kick returner in 1968, returning 29 kicks for 589 yards but played sparingly on offense. His best game as a wide receiver came on December 13, 1970, when he caught six passes for 120 yards for the Redskins, including a 56-yard touchdown against the Philadelphia Eagles.
