= Bill Nunn (American football) =

American journalist and football scout

Profile
- Position: Scout

Personal information
- Born: September 30, 1924; Pittsburgh, Pennsylvania, U.S.
- Died: May 6, 2014 (aged 89); Pittsburgh, Pennsylvania, U.S.

Career information
- High school: Westinghouse (Pittsburgh)
- College: West Virginia State College

Career history
- Pittsburgh Steelers (1970–1987) Assistant personnel director; Pittsburgh Steelers (1987–2014) Scout

Awards and highlights
- 6× Super Bowl champion (as scout) — (IX, X, XIII, XIV, XL, XLIII); Black College Football Hall of Fame (inaugural member – 2010); Pittsburgh Steelers Hall of Honor
- Pro Football Hall of Fame

William Goldwyn Nunn Jr. (September 30, 1924 – May 6, 2014) was an American sportswriter, newspaper editor and football scout for the Pittsburgh Steelers in the National Football League (NFL) and is a 2021 member of the Pro Football Hall of Fame. Due to the fame of his son, actor William G. Nunn III, he was also known as Bill Nunn Sr.

== Early life ==
Nunn was born and raised in the Homewood neighborhood of Pittsburgh, Pennsylvania. He is the son of William G. Nunn Sr., who was the managing editor of the Pittsburgh Courier. The Courier was among the most influential black publications in the nation.

The younger Nunn attended college at West Virginia State where he was a stand-out basketball player on a team which went 26–0 in his senior season. His high school and college teammate, Chuck Cooper would become the first black player drafted by the NBA. Another college teammate, Earl Lloyd, was the first black person to play in an NBA game.

Nunn was recruited by the Harlem Globetrotters, but chose instead to return home to Pittsburgh to work at the Courier.

== Journalism ==
Nunn started as a sportswriter at the Courier, and eventually moved up to become the sports editor and then managing editor in the mid-1960s after his father's retirement.

== Scouting career ==
As a sportswriter for a black publication, Nunn developed deep knowledge of football programs at historically black colleges and universities. The Courier named a "Black College All-America" team starting in 1950. The NFL's Pittsburgh Steelers noted Nunn's coverage of these players who were traditionally under-represented in the league and in 1967 Nunn accepted a part-time position on team's scouting staff. The sideline became a full-time position two years later when Chuck Noll became the team's coach.

Nunn is most noted for scouting players such as Mel Blount, John Stallworth, Donnie Shell and Sam Davis from historically black colleges and universities (HBCU) who played integral roles in the Steelers' four Super Bowl championships during the 1970s. In the case of Stallworth, scouts from various NFL teams observed him run the 40-yard dash on a wet track at Alabama A&M University and were disappointed by the results. Nunn was the only scout to stay an additional day and watched Stallworth run a better time on a dry track. Nunn also had obtained the only college game film of Stallworth that existed through his relationships with HBCU coaches, and it was alleged that he withheld it from other NFL teams.

== Personal life ==
Nunn lived with his wife, Frances, in the Schenley Heights neighborhood of Pittsburgh. Their son Bill was an actor; he played Radio Raheem in Do The Right Thing. Because of his son's fame, the elder Nunn referred to himself as Bill Nunn Sr. Their daughter, Lynell Wilson, is a former U.S. Attorney.

Nunn died on May 6, 2014, at the University of Pittsburgh Medical Center, two weeks after suffering a stroke. Burial was at Homewood Cemetery, Pittsburgh. Posthumously in 2021, Bill Nunn was elected to the Pro Football Hall of Fame in Canton, Ohio as a contributor. As a Steelers Scout, 13 of his players who were drafted were also enshrined in the Hall of Fame.

== The Bill Nunn Award ==
Per the Pro Football Hall of Fame: "The Bill Nunn Memorial Award is presented annually by the Professional Football Writers of America in recognition of long and distinguished reporting in the field of pro football. The award, which originated in 1969, was renamed in 2021 in tribute to Nunn, a longtime writer and editor at the Pittsburgh Courier.

Alongside his career in journalism, Nunn worked for approximately fifty years in the Pittsburgh Steelers’ scouting department. In 2021, he became the first African American elected to the Pro Football Hall of Fame in the Contributor category."
