= Dennis Hughes (American football) =

American football player (born 1948)

No. 82, 80
- Position: Tight end

Personal information
- Born: February 22, 1948 (age 78); Seneca, South Carolina, U.S.
- Listed height: 6 ft 1 in (1.85 m)
- Listed weight: 225 lb (102 kg)

Career information
- High school: Seneca (South Carolina)
- College: Georgia
- NFL draft: 1970: undrafted

Career history
- Pittsburgh Steelers (1970–1971); Houston Oilers (1972)*; Jacksonville Sharks (1974); Jacksonville Express (1975)
- * Offseason or practice squad member only

Awards and highlights
- First-team All-SEC (1968)

Career NFL statistics
- Receptions: 24
- Receiving yards: 332
- Receiving TDs: 3
- Stats at Pro Football Reference

Donald Dennis Hughes (born February 22, 1948) is an American former professional football player who was a tight end for two seasons with the Pittsburgh Steelers of the National Football League (NFL). He played college football for the Georgia Bulldogs. He also played for the Jacksonville Sharks and Jacksonville Express of the World Football League (WFL).

== Early life and college ==
Donald Dennis Hughes was born on February 22, 1948, in Seneca, South Carolina. He attended Seneca High School in Seneca.

Hughes played college football for the Bulldogs of the University of Georgia. He was on the freshman team in 1966 and was a three-year letterman from 1967 to 1969. He caught 18 passes for 356 yards and three touchdowns in 1967, 26 passes for 491 yards and four touchdowns in 1968, and 22 passes for 360 yards and two touchdowns in 1969. Hughes also rushed 33 times for 149 yards and one touchdown during the 1969 season. His 18.9 yards per catch in 1968 were the most in the Southeastern Conference (SEC) that season. He was named first-team All-SEC by the Associated Press for the 1968 season.

== Professional career ==
Hughes signed with the Pittsburgh Steelers after going undrafted in the 1970 NFL draft. He played in 11 games, starting eight, for the Steelers during his rookie year in 1970, catching 24 passes for 332 yards and three touchdowns. He appeared in seven games in 1971 but did not record any receptions. Hughes became a free agent after the 1971 season.

Hughes signed with the Houston Oilers in 1972 but was later released.

Hughes was signed by the Jacksonville Sharks of the World Football League (WFL) on March 23, 1974. He caught 31 passes for 508 yards and two touchdowns for the Sharks during the 1974 season while also punting once for 43 yards. The Sharks folded with six games left to play in the season.

Hughes signed with the unrelated Jacksonville Express of the WFL in 1975. He recorded 36 receptions for 552 yards and four touchdowns for the Express that year.
