= Dave Smith (wide receiver) =

American football player (1947–2020)

No. 88, 87, 85
- Position: Wide receiver

Personal information
- Born: May 18, 1947; New York City, New York, U.S.
- Died: May 22, 2020 (aged 73); Washington, D.C., U.S.
- Listed height: 6 ft 2 in (1.88 m)
- Listed weight: 205 lb (93 kg)

Career information
- High school: New York (NY)
- College: Indiana (PA) / Waynesburg
- NFL draft: 1970: 8th round, 184th overall pick

Career history
- Pittsburgh Steelers (1970–1972); Houston Oilers (1972); Kansas City Chiefs (1973)

Career NFL statistics
- Receptions: 109
- Receiving yards: 1,457
- Receiving TDs: 7
- Stats at Pro Football Reference

David Lewis Smith (May 18, 1947 – May 22, 2020) was an American professional football player who was a wide receiver in the National Football League (NFL). He was selected by the Pittsburgh Steelers in the eighth round of the 1970 NFL draft. He played college football and basketball at Indiana (PA) and Waynesburg.

Smith was known for a fumble in a Monday Night Football game against the Kansas City Chiefs while trying to score a touchdown, and led the Steelers in touchdown receptions in 1971. He also played for the Houston Oilers and Kansas City.

Smith died on May 22, 2020, at age 73.
