= Ken Vinyard =

American football player (born 1947)

No. 22, 8
- Position: Placekicker

Personal information
- Born: June 18, 1947 (age 79); Amarillo, Texas, U.S.
- Listed height: 5 ft 10 in (1.78 m)
- Listed weight: 190 lb (86 kg)

Career information
- High school: Amarillo
- College: Texas Tech (1965-1968)
- NFL draft: 1969: 6th round, 149th overall pick

Career history
- West Texas Rufneks (1969); Atlanta Falcons (1970)

Awards and highlights
- First-team All-SWC (1968)

Career NFL statistics
- Field goals: 9/25
- Field goal %: 36
- Longest field goal: 49
- Extra points: 23/26
- Stats at Pro Football Reference

Kenneth Raymond Vinyard (born June 18, 1947) is a former placekicker in the National Football League (NFL). Vinyard was drafted 149th overall by the Green Bay Packers in the sixth round of the 1969 NFL/AFL draft and would play the following season with the Atlanta Falcons.
