= Jon Kolb =

American football player (born 1947)

No. 55
- Positions: Offensive tackle, Center

Personal information
- Born: August 30, 1947 (age 79); Ponca City, Oklahoma, U.S.
- Listed height: 6 ft 2 in (1.88 m)
- Listed weight: 262 lb (119 kg)

Career information
- High school: Owasso (Owasso, Oklahoma)
- College: Oklahoma State
- NFL draft: 1969: 3rd round, 56th overall pick

Career history
- Pittsburgh Steelers (1969–1981)

Awards and highlights
- 4× Super Bowl champion (IX, X, XIII, XIV); First-team All-Pro (1979); Pittsburgh Steelers All-Time Team; Pittsburgh Steelers 50th season All-Time team; Pittsburgh Steelers Hall of Honor; 2× Second-team All-American (1967, 1968); 2× First-team All-Big Eight (1967, 1968)

Career NFL statistics
- Games played: 177
- Games started: 138
- Fumble recoveries: 4
- Stats at Pro Football Reference

Competition record

Strongman

Representing United States

World's Strongest Man
| 4th | 1978 World's Strongest Man |
| 4th | 1979 World's Strongest Man |

Jon Kolb (born August 30, 1947) is an American former professional football player who was an offensive tackle and center for 13 seasons with the Pittsburgh Steelers of the National Football League (NFL). He played college football for the Oklahoma State Cowboys. He was also an occasional strongman competitor in some of the early World's Strongest Man contests.

== Early life ==
Born in Ponca City, Oklahoma, Kolb attended Owasso High School, where he earned all-state honors during his senior year. He attended Oklahoma State University–Stillwater where he started at center. While at OSU, he was named All-Big Eight in 1967 and 1968 and was selected as All-American in 1968.

== Professional career ==
Kolb was drafted in the third roundby Pittsburgh out of OSU in 1969. He played with the Steelers from 1969 to 1981. Kolb did not join in any game during his first two years, not until 1971, where he started as the left offensive tackle, replacing Mike Haggerty, for all 14 games. He remained in that position until 1981, his final year, though in the final two years he shared time with Ted Petersen (1980) and Ray Pinney (1981). He played next to left guard Sam Davis from 1971 to 1979, which was Davis' final year. Overall, Kolb started at offensive tackle in 177 games and earned 4 Super Bowl rings, during the 1974, 1975, 1978, and 1979 seasons.

During his playing days, Kolb was widely regarded as one of the strongest men in the NFL. He played like the strongest one, protecting Terry Bradshaw's blind side from his left offensive tackle position on pass plays and opening holes for running backs Franco Harris, Rocky Bleier, and John Fuqua. Like many of the Steeler players of the 1970s, Kolb had his own cadre of fans, known as "Kolb's Kowboys."

== Strongman competitions ==
Kolb competed in the second and third annual World's Strongest Man competitions in 1978 and 1979, placing in the 4th rank for both years, while often defeating much heavier and stronger competitors in certain events.

=== Personal records ===
- Wrist roll – 56.5 kg (125 lb) over a 10ft high course in 18.6 seconds (1978 World's Strongest Man) (World Record)

== Life after competition ==
After his playing career ended, he became a strength and conditioning coach with the Steelers. He founded a nonprofit organization called Adventures In Training With A Purpose where he works with his family until now. ATP serves veterans and first responders by offering free physical and mental health services. It also serves civilians living with chronic disease and illness.

== Personal life ==
Kolb currently resides in Hermitage, Pennsylvania with his wife Deborah. They have three sons. He served as the defensive coordinator for Grove City College for six seasons. Kolb is currently teaching part-time in the Human Performance and Exercise Science department at Youngstown State University in Youngstown, Ohio as well as BC3 in New Castle, Pennsylvania.
