= Clarence Washington =

American football player (born 1946)

No. 67
- Position: Defensive tackle

Personal information
- Born: December 23, 1946 (age 79); Little Rock, Arkansas, U.S.
- Listed height: 6 ft 3 in (1.91 m)
- Listed weight: 264 lb (120 kg)

Career information
- College: Arkansas–Pine Bluff
- NFL draft: 1969: 11th round, 264th overall pick

Career history
- Pittsburgh Steelers (1969–1971)

Career NFL statistics
- Games played: 27
- Stats at Pro Football Reference

Clarence Washington (born December 23, 1946) is an American former professional football player who was a defensive tackle for three seasons with the Pittsburgh Steelers in the National Football League (NFL) from 1969 to 1971. He played college football for the Arkansas–Pine Bluff Golden Lions, playing alongside and rooming with future Steeler teammate L. C. Greenwood. According to sportswriter Jack Zanger, he and Greenwood both "demonstrated that they were worthy backup men" in 1969. Washington played in 13 games as a backup tackle in 1969 and then in all 14 games in 1970. Washington missed the 1971 season after suffering a broken leg during preseason workouts. He was traded to the Chicago Bears prior to the 1972 season for a draft pick due to the Steelers' surplus of quality defensive linemen, but the deal was voided because Washington failed the physical exam.
