= Lee Calland =

American football player (born 1941)

No. 23, 22, 44
- Position: Cornerback

Personal information
- Born: September 14, 1941 (age 85); Louisville, Kentucky, U.S.
- Listed height: 6 ft 0 in (1.83 m)
- Listed weight: 190 lb (86 kg)

Career information
- High school: Central (Louisville)
- College: Louisville
- NFL draft: 1963: undrafted

Career history
- Minnesota Vikings (1963–1965); Atlanta Falcons (1966–1968); Chicago Bears (1969); Pittsburgh Steelers (1969-1972)

Career NFL statistics
- Interceptions: 19
- Fumble recoveries: 6
- Total touchdowns: 1
- Sacks: 1
- Stats at Pro Football Reference

Arthur Lee Calland (born September 14, 1941) is an American former professional football player who was a defensive back in the National Football League (NFL). He played college football for the Louisville Cardinals. Calland played 10 seasons in the NFL for the Minnesota Vikings (1963–1965), the Atlanta Falcons (1966–1968), the Chicago Bears (1969), and the Pittsburgh Steelers (1969–1972).

After leaving the NFL, Calland coached defense at Fort Valley State University, Morehouse College, Southern University, Morris Brown College, and Tennessee State University. He was inducted into the Kentucky Pro Football Hall of Fame in 2022. As of 2022, Calland resides in Atlanta, Georgia.
