= Gene Mingo =

American football player (born 1938)

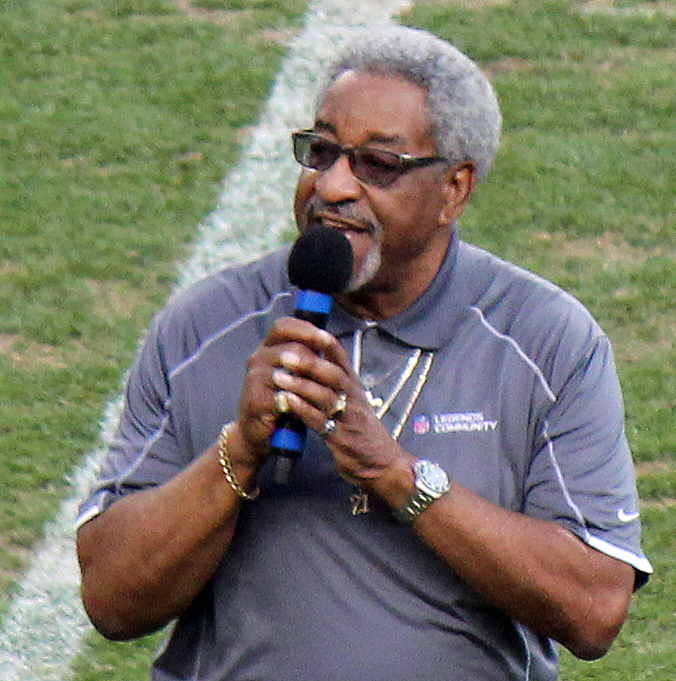

No. 21, 11, 16
- Positions: Running back, placekicker, kick returner

Personal information
- Born: September 22, 1938 (age 88); Akron, Ohio, U.S.
- Listed height: 6 ft 2 in (1.88 m)
- Listed weight: 216 lb (98 kg)

Career information
- High school: Akron (OH) South
- College: None
- NFL draft: 1960: undrafted

Career history
- Denver Broncos (1960–1964); Oakland Raiders (1964–1965); Miami Dolphins (1966–1967); Washington Redskins (1967); Pittsburgh Steelers (1969–1970)

Awards and highlights
- 2× AFL All-Star (1960, 1962); 2× AFL scoring leader (1960, 1962); Denver Broncos Ring of Fame; NFL record: Most touchdown passes by a halfback, game: 2

Career NFL statistics
- Field goals attempted / made: 112 / 219
- Field goal percentage: 51.1%
- Points scored: 629
- Total touchdowns: 13
- Rushing yards: 777
- Rushing average: 4.2
- Stats at Pro Football Reference

Eugene L. Mingo (born September 22, 1938) is an American former professional football player who played in the American Football League (AFL) and National Football League (NFL). He played several positions including halfback, placekicker, and return specialist. He is widely recognized as the first African American placekicker in football.

== Early life ==
He played youth football at the behest of a cousin, Dean Newby. After quitting, his cousin was angry. He called Gene a quitter, and tried to get him to come back. Shortly after, his cousin lost his life when mauled by a dog. When his aunt called him a quitter, too, he went back to football. After missing a couple of years to care for his terminally ill mother, he returned to school and found out that he excelled at football.

He later dropped out of high school and joined the Navy where he played for a Navy team and was a star. After his discharge, he returned to Akron and worked at the Goodyear plant.

== Pro career ==
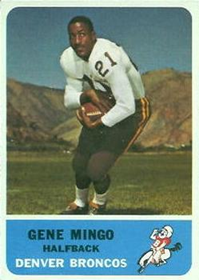
Mingo on 1961 card

Reading the paper in the lead up to the inaugural 1960 season, he read about a former opponent who had played for the Army who was signed by the Denver Broncos. He wrote them a letter and received a contract. He made the team without having played any college football.

In 1960, he had the first punt return for a touchdown in the American Football League, for the Denver Broncos. That touchdown won the first-ever American Football League game, as the Broncos defeated the Boston Patriots. Mingo also scored the first points in Mile High Stadium, then called Bears Stadium, with an 18-yard field goal. In the 1961 season opener at War Memorial Stadium against the Buffalo Bills, Mingo threw a touchdown pass, from the halfback position, to help the Broncos win 22-10: a 50-yarder to Lionel Taylor in the first quarter. Mingo kicked the PATs after each score. He led the American Football League in scoring as a rookie in 1960 with 123 points and in 1962 with 137 points. Mingo holds the Broncos' franchise record for the longest touchdown run, an 82-yarder against the Raiders in 1962. He also played for the Oakland Raiders, Miami Dolphins, and Washington Redskins. He kicked for the Pittsburgh Steelers in 1969 and 1970.

== Personal life ==
After he retired, Mingo became a drug and alcohol counselor in the Denver area. He also spent many years involved with the Denver Broncos Alumni Association.

== Legacy ==
On September 14, 2014, Mingo, along with Dan Reeves and Rick Upchurch, was inducted into the Broncos Ring of Fame.

== See also ==
- List of American Football League players
