= Louis Riecke =

American weightlifter and former football coach

Louis George "Lou" Riecke Jr. (October 2, 1926 – May 31, 2017) was an Olympic weightlifter for the United States. He also was a coach for the NFL's Pittsburgh Steelers.

== Weightlifting achievements ==
- Olympic Games team member (1964)
- Set one world record in career

== Coaching career ==
Riecke served as the strength and conditioning coach for the Steelers from 1970 through 1980. During his tenure, the team won four Super Bowls.
