= L. C. Greenwood =

American football player (1946–2013)

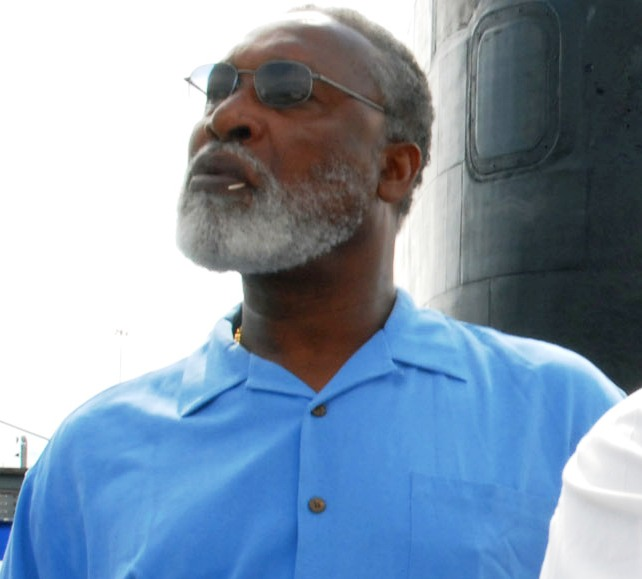
- Greenwood in 2007, aboard the USS Albany (SSN-753)

No. 68
- Position: Defensive end

Personal information
- Born: September 8, 1946; Canton, Mississippi, U.S.
- Died: September 29, 2013 (aged 67); Pittsburgh, Pennsylvania, U.S.
- Listed height: 6 ft 6 in (1.98 m)
- Listed weight: 245 lb (111 kg)

Career information
- High school: Rogers (Canton)
- College: Arkansas-Pine Bluff
- NFL draft: 1969: 10th round, 238th overall pick

Career history
- Pittsburgh Steelers (1969–1981)

Awards and highlights
- 4× Super Bowl champion (IX, X, XIII, XIV); 2× First-team All-Pro (1974, 1975); 6× Pro Bowl (1973–1976, 1978, 1979); NFL 1970s All-Decade Team; Pittsburgh Steelers All-Time Team; Pittsburgh Steelers Hall of Honor

Career NFL statistics
- Games: 170
- Safeties: 1
- Fumble recoveries: 14
- Stats at Pro Football Reference

L. C. Henderson Greenwood (September 8, 1946 – September 29, 2013) was an American professional football player who was a defensive end for the Pittsburgh Steelers of the National Football League (NFL). He played college football for the Arkansas AM&N Golden Lions.

== College career ==
Greenwood was born and raised in Canton, Mississippi. He graduated from Arkansas AM&N (now University of Arkansas at Pine Bluff), where he became a member of the Beta Theta chapter of Phi Beta Sigma fraternity. He was also named the 1968 Ebony All-American defensive lineman in the Southwestern Athletic Conference (SWAC).

== Professional career ==
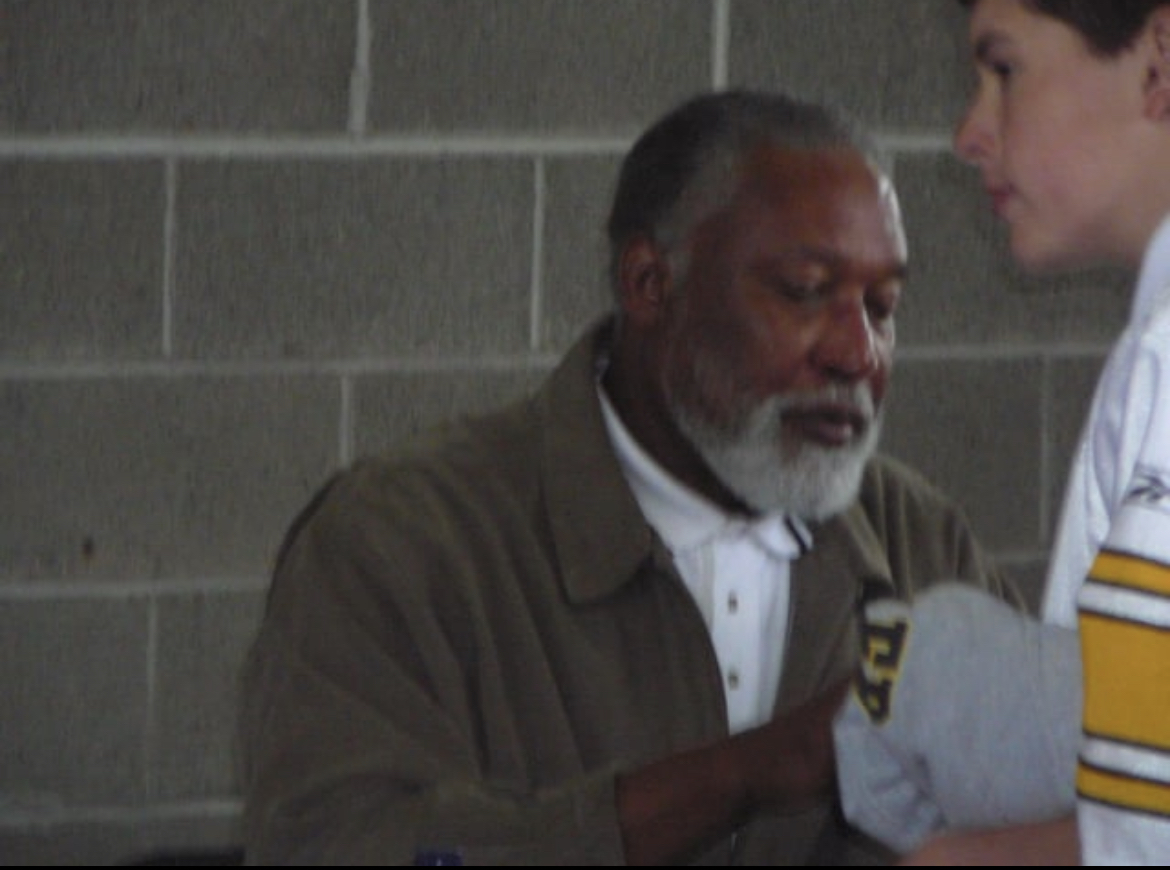
Greenwood signing autographs at Heinz Field in 2007

Greenwood was selected in the tenth round of the 1969 NFL/AFL draft by the Pittsburgh Steelers, who had finished at 2–11–1 the previous season, and replaced head coach Bill Austin with Chuck Noll. In 1971, he became the starting left defensive end. One of the four members of Pittsburgh's famous Steel Curtain, he remained there until retirement in 1981. At 6 ft 6 in (1.98 m) and 245 pounds (111 kg), Greenwood was a six-time Pro Bowl player and was named to NFL All-Pro teams in 1974 and 1975, and was All-AFC five times. He also led the Steelers six times in sacks with a career total of 78 (an unofficial stat at the time). According to records kept by the Steelers, Greenwood's highest single-season sack total was 11, which he attained in 1974. He further had 14 fumble recoveries in his career, including five in 1971, which tied for the NFL lead.

In Super Bowl IX against the Minnesota Vikings in New Orleans, Greenwood batted down two passes from Fran Tarkenton. The next year against the Dallas Cowboys in Miami, he sacked Roger Staubach four times. Greenwood played in all four of the Steelers' Super Bowl victories (IX, X, XIII, XIV) in the 1970s. Unofficially, he had five sacks in those four title games.

Greenwood was known for wearing gold-colored shoes on the football field, to help announcers distinguish him from the higher-profile Joe Greene. Greenwood was called "Hollywood Bags" because of his desire to become an actor after retiring from football. He has been a finalist six times for the Pro Football Hall of Fame but has yet to be elected. Greenwood has stated that while he would be honored if he were to be inducted into the Hall of Fame, he would not be upset if he were not elected, feeling that the Steelers already in the Hall (in particular, "Mean Joe" Greene) represent the entire team's accomplishments.

While Greene retired following the 1981 season, Greenwood did try to continue his career as the Steelers transitioned to the 3–4 defense, in which Greenwood's traditional role would be more of an edge rusher. Greenwood, unable to make the adjustment as well as declining skills, was cut two weeks before the start of the regular season, after which he retired.

In 1991, Greenwood was named to the Super Bowl Silver Anniversary Team and in 2007 he was named to the Steelers All-Time team. In 2012, the Professional Football Researchers Association named Greenwood to the PRFA Hall of Very Good Class of 2012.

== Death ==
Greenwood died of kidney failure on September 29, 2013, at UPMC Presbyterian. He was 67 years old.

He was buried at the Priestley Chapel Missionary Baptist Church Cemetery in Canton, Mississippi.
