= Chuck Beatty =

American football player and politician (born 1946)

No. 37, 31, 44
- Position: Safety

Personal information
- Born: February 8, 1946 (age 80); Midlothian, Texas, U.S.
- Listed height: 6 ft 2 in (1.88 m)
- Listed weight: 200 lb (91 kg)

Career information
- High school: Turner (Waxahachie, Texas)
- College: North Texas State (1965-1968)
- NFL draft: 1969: 7th round, 160th overall pick

Career history
- Pittsburgh Steelers (1969–1972); St. Louis Cardinals (1972); Florida Blazers (1974); San Antonio Wings (1975)

Career NFL statistics
- Interceptions: 4
- Touchdowns: 1
- Stats at Pro Football Reference

Charles Beatty (born February 8, 1946) is an American politician and former professional football player. He played in the National Football League (NFL) for four seasons.

== Early life and college ==
Beatty was born in Midlothian, but grew up mainly in nearby Waxahachie, Texas. After graduating from Turner High School in Waxahachie, Beatty went on to attend the North Texas State University (now University of North Texas). At North Texas State and later in the NFL with the Steelers, he was a teammate of star defensive tackle Joe Greene, and he served as best man at Greene's wedding.

== Professional career ==
Beatty was selected in the seventh round of the 1969 NFL/AFL draft. He was the second North Texas State player to be selected by the Pittsburgh Steelers in that draft — the first being the team's first-round selection Joe Greene.

Beatty played nearly four seasons for the Steelers before finishing his NFL career with the St. Louis Cardinals in 1972. In 1974, he played for the Florida Blazers of the World Football League (WFL).

== Post-football career ==
Beatty served as an executive of the Boy Scouts of America for 30 years. In 1995, he was elected to the city council of Waxahachie. He was appointed by the council in 1997 to serve as mayor, a position he held for the next five years. As of 2010, he continues to serve as a city councilman. He served on the board of regents of his alma mater, the University of North Texas from 2002 through 2006.

== Personal life ==
Beatty is a widower (Rosalind) and has two children, Lauren Odette Beatty and Charles Brandon Beatty. He was inducted into the Texas Black Sports Hall of Fame in 2002 and to the University of North Texas Sports Hall of Fame in 2003.
