= Brian Stenger =

American football player (born 1947)

No. 61, 59
- Position: Linebacker

Personal information
- Born: January 6, 1947 (age 79); Euclid, Ohio, U.S.
- Listed height: 6 ft 4 in (1.93 m)
- Listed weight: 241 lb (109 kg)

Career information
- High school: Cleveland (OH) St. Joseph
- College: Notre Dame

Career history
- Pittsburgh Steelers (1969–1972); New England Patriots (1973)

Awards and highlights
- National champion (1966)
- Stats at Pro Football Reference

Brian Stenger (born January 16, 1947) is an American former professional football player who was a linebacker in the National Football League (NFL). He played college football for the Notre Dame Fighting Irish. Stenger played in the NFL for the Pittsburgh Steelers from 1969 to 1972 and New England Patriots in 1973.
