= Sam Davis (American football) =

American football player (1944–2019)

No. 57
- Position: Guard

Personal information
- Born: July 5, 1944; Ocilla, Georgia, U.S.
- Died: September 10, 2019 (aged 75); McKeesport, Pennsylvania, U.S.
- Listed height: 6 ft 1 in (1.85 m)
- Listed weight: 255 lb (116 kg)

Career information
- High school: Northwestern (Jacksonville, Florida)
- College: Allen
- NFL draft: 1967: undrafted

Career history
- Pittsburgh Steelers (1967–1979)

Awards and highlights
- 4× Super Bowl champion (IX, X, XIII, XIV); Pittsburgh Steelers 50th Anniversary Team; Pittsburgh Steelers Hall of Honor

Career NFL statistics
- Games played: 168
- Games started: 114
- Fumble recoveries: 4
- Stats at Pro Football Reference

Samuel Davis (July 5, 1944 – September 10, 2019) was an American professional football player who was a guard for the Pittsburgh Steelers of the National Football League (NFL) from 1967 to 1979. He won four Super Bowls with the Steelers.

== Early life and college career ==
Davis was born in Ocilla, Georgia, and attended Northwestern High School in Jacksonville, Florida. He played college football at Allen University in Columbia, South Carolina.

== Professional career ==
Davis was an undrafted rookie in 1967. He did not start any game during his first three years of play, but started at the left offensive guard position for the National Football League's Pittsburgh Steelers from 1970 to 1979. In 1970, Chuck Noll's second year as head coach, Davis replaced Larry Gagner and started all 14 games. From 1970 to 1979, he played next to left offensive tackle Jon Kolb and the two went on to win four Super Bowl rings together with the Steelers (Super Bowls IX, X, XIII, and XIV). However, Davis injured his foot before Pittsburgh's first Super Bowl and Jim Clack started in his place in Super Bowls IX and then retained the starting job throughout the 1975 season and Super Bowl X. In 1980, he was replaced by Ray Pinney.

== Death ==
On September 10, 2019, at approximately 6:50 am, Davis, aged 75, was reported missing from the New Life Care Personal Home in McKeesport, Pennsylvania. He had been suffering from dementia and was legally blind. Later that evening, authorities announced that Davis was found deceased inside of the facility. Davis' family later stated that he had died of a heart attack.
