= 1974 Pittsburgh Steelers season =

Pittsburgh Steelers 42nd US football season

- Owner: Art Rooney
- General manager: Daniel M. Rooney
- Head coach: Chuck Noll
- Home stadium: Three Rivers Stadium

Results
- Record: 10–3–1
- Division place: 1st AFC Central
- Playoffs: Won Divisional Playoffs (vs. Bills) 32–14; Won AFC Championship (at Raiders) 24–13; Won Super Bowl IX (vs. Vikings) 16–6
- All-Pros: 4: Joe Greene (1st team); L. C. Greenwood (1st team); Jack Ham (1st team); Roy Gerela (2nd team)
- Pro Bowlers: 6: PK Roy Gerela; DT Joe Greene; DE L. C. Greenwood; LB Jack Ham; RB Franco Harris; LB Andy Russell
- Team MVP: Glen Edwards
- Team ROY: Jack Lambert

The 1974 Pittsburgh Steelers season was the franchise's 42nd in the National Football League (NFL). They improved to a 10–3–1 regular-season record, won the AFC Central division title, sending them to the playoffs for the third consecutive season, and won a Super Bowl championship, the first league title in Steelers' history. This was the first of six consecutive AFC Central division titles for the Steelers, and the first of four Super Bowl championships in the same time period.

The Steelers also made history by playing in the NFL's first-ever regular season overtime game, the league having introduced a 15-minute sudden-death period to break ties. Their Week 2 contest against the Denver Broncos nevertheless ended in a 35–35 tie. As of 2023 no other team has ever won the Super Bowl after recording a tie in the overtime era.

On March 9, 2007, NFL Network aired an episode of America's Game: The Super Bowl Champions that covered the 1974 Pittsburgh Steelers, with team commentary from Franco Harris, Joe Greene, and Andy Russell, and narrated by Ed Harris.

== Offseason ==
=== NFL draft ===
During the offseason, the Steelers held their training camp in St. Vincent College in Latrobe, Pennsylvania.

During the 1974 NFL draft, the Pittsburgh Steelers would draft WR Lynn Swann in Round 1, LB Jack Lambert in Round 2, WR John Stallworth in Round 4, and C Mike Webster in Round 5, and they also signed S Donnie Shell as an undrafted free agent. All five would later be inducted into the Pro Football Hall of Fame. As of 2025, the 1974 Steelers are the only team in NFL history to select four Hall of Fame players in one single draft and acquire five in a single rookie class.

1974 Pittsburgh Steelers draft
Round	Pick	Player	Position	College	Notes
1	21	Lynn Swann ^{†}	WR	USC	given #88
2	46	Jack Lambert ^{†}	LB	Kent State	1974 NFL Defensive Rookie of the Year, given #58
4	82	John Stallworth ^{†}	WR	Alabama A&M	given #82
4	100	Jimmy Allen	S	UCLA	given #45
5	125	Mike Webster ^{†}	C	Wisconsin	Alternated with Ray Mansfield for the rest of Ray's career, given #52
6	149	Jim Wolf	DE	Prairie View A&M	given #62
6	150	Rick Druschel	Guard	North Carolina State	given #46
7	165	Allen Sitterle	T	North Carolina State	
7	179	Scott Garske	TE	Eastern Washington	
8	204	Mark Gefert	LB	Purdue	
9	223	Tommy Reamon	RB	Missouri	played for the WFL in 1974
9	229	Charlie Davis	DT	TCU	given #77
10	243	Jim Kregel	G	Ohio State	
10	254	Dave Atkinson	DB	BYU	
11	283	Dick Morton	RB	Arkansas	
12	308	Hugh Lickiss	LB	Simpson	
13	333	Frank Kolch	QB	Eastern Michigan	
14	333	Bruce Henley	DB	Rice	
15	387	Larry Hunt	DT	Iowa State	
16	412	Octavus Morgan	LB	Illinois	
17	437	Larry Moore	DE	Angelo State	
Made roster † Pro Football Hall of Fame * Made at least one Pro Bowl during career

== Preseason ==
In the 1974 preseason, the Steelers went 6–0 and were the only undefeated team in the NFL. However, most of the talk was centered around the NFL's first successful black quarterback, Joe Gilliam. Chuck Noll started Gilliam in the preseason and after it ended, Noll started him for the first few games of the regular season. Gilliam's stellar performance in the preseason sparked a quarterback controversy in Pittsburgh.

== Regular season ==
Following playoff appearances in both of the two previous seasons, the Steelers appeared to be in great shape after finishing the preseason as the only undefeated team in the NFL. After the first two regular season games, the Steelers had scored a total of 65 points and were 1–0–1, but then lost to the Oakland Raiders at home. The play of the Steelers' starting quarterback at the time, Joe Gilliam, continually deteriorated. By week 7, the Steelers were 4–1–1 and Gilliam was benched for Terry Bradshaw during a win against the Atlanta Falcons. Bradshaw won the next two games, but after a loss in Cincinnati, Noll benched Bradshaw again, this time in favor of Terry Hanratty (who had been selected in the 1969 draft). However, Hanratty played horribly in Cleveland. The offense was struggling, but the Steelers had won those tough games behind the still-maturing Steel Curtain defense. When Bradshaw was brought back into the starting lineup, the Steelers beat the Cleveland Browns and the New Orleans Saints (in a game in which Bradshaw ran for more yards than he passed). After a loss to Houston, the Steelers played the most important game of their regular season in New England. A win over the Patriots would clinch the AFC Central division title for the Steelers and put them in the playoffs for the third straight year. The Steelers defeated the Patriots, then beat the Cincinnati Bengals, and awaited the playoffs.

== Playoffs ==
In the divisional round of the playoffs, the Steelers played the Buffalo Bills. Sports Illustrated's Dan Jenkins wrote that Pittsburgh was "the only team to reach the playoffs without a quarterback". However, the Steelers dominated Buffalo and held its star running back O. J. Simpson to 49 yards rushing (it was Simpson's only playoff game appearance).

In the 1974 AFC Championship game, the Steelers played an old foe, the Oakland Raiders. Each year, their rivalry was escalating: they had met in the playoffs the previous two seasons. In 1972, the Steelers won in Pittsburgh; in 1973, the Raiders returned the favor in Oakland. In this third playoff meeting, the Steelers were ready for anything the Raiders could throw at them. Using the new "Stunt 4–3 defense" the Steelers held the Raiders to 29 yards rushing as the Steelers themselves ran for over 200 yards in Oakland. After a Franco Harris touchdown run, the Steelers clinched their first Super Bowl appearance in club history (and their first league championship game appearance).

=== Super Bowl IX ===
The Steelers met the Minnesota Vikings in Super Bowl IX. Both teams had a hard time in the rough weather conditions at old Tulane Stadium in New Orleans. After many exchanges of punts, the Steelers finally scored a safety on a bobbled handoff by Viking quarterback Fran Tarkenton. The score at the half was 2–0. The Steel Curtain continually dominated the Vikings. Vikings coach Bud Grant tried to run at the strength of the Steel Curtain, but they were shut down. The only points Minnesota scored came from a blocked punt that the Vikings recovered in the end zone for a touchdown; the subsequent extra point attempt was blocked. After the MVP performance by running back Franco Harris (34 carries for a then-Super Bowl-record 158 yards and a touchdown), the Steelers came away with a 16–6 victory. It was the first league title in Steelers history.

== Personnel ==
=== Staff ===
1974 Pittsburgh Steelers staff
Front office: President – Arthur J. Rooney; Vice president – John R. McGinley; Vice president – Daniel M. Rooney; Vice president – Arthur J. Rooney, Jr.; Public relations director – Ed Kiely; Traveling secretary – James A. Boston; Controller – Robert P. Quinn; Accountant – Dennis P. Thimons; Publicity director – Joe Gordon; Ticket manager – Joseph H. Carr; Director of player personnel – Dick Haley; Assistant director of player personnel – Bill Nunn; Director of professional scouting – V. Timothy Rooney; Head coaches: Head coach – Chuck Noll; Offensive coaches: Offensive backfield – Dick Hoak; Offensive line – Dan Radakovich; Receivers – Lionel Taylor	Defensive coaches: Defensive coordinator – Bud Carson; Defensive line – George Perles; Linebackers – Woody Widenhofer; Strength and conditioning: Strength – Louis Riecke; Flexibility – Paul Uram; Team physician, orthopedic – Dr. John Best; Team Physician, M.D. – Dr. David S. Huber; Team dentist – Dr. Robert Gray; Trainer – Ralph Berlin; Equipment manager – Anthony Parisi; Field manager – Jack Hart

=== Roster ===
1974 Pittsburgh Steelers roster
Quarterbacks (QB): 12 Terry Bradshaw; 17 Joe Gilliam; 5 Terry Hanratty; Running backs (RB): 20 Rocky Bleier; 35 Steve Davis; 32 Franco Harris; 46 Reggie Harrison; 26 Preston Pearson; Wide receivers (WR): 86 Reggie Garrett; 43 Frank Lewis; 25 Ronnie Shanklin; 82 John Stallworth; 88 Lynn Swann; Tight ends (TE): 87 Larry Brown; 84 Randy Grossman; 89 John McMakin	Offensive linemen (OL): 50 Jim Clack G; 57 Sam Davis G; 73 Rick Druschel G; 71 Gordon Gravelle T; 55 Jon Kolb T; 56 Ray Mansfield C; 72 Gerry Mullins G; 74 Dave Reavis T; 52 Mike Webster C; Defensive linemen (DL): 77 Charlie Davis DT; 64 Steve Furness DT; 75 Joe Greene DT; 68 L. C. Greenwood DE; 63 Ernie Holmes DT; 78 Dwight White DE; 62 Jim Wolf DE	Linebackers (LB): 38 Ed Bradley MLB; 59 Jack Ham OLB; 54 Marv Kellum OLB; 58 Jack Lambert MLB; 34 Andy Russell OLB; 51 Loren Toews OLB; Defensive backs (DB): 45 Jimmy Allen CB; 47 Mel Blount CB; 22 Dick Conn FS; 27 Glen Edwards FS; 31 Donnie Shell SS; 24 J. T. Thomas CB; 23 Mike Wagner SS; Special teams (ST): 10 Roy Gerela K; 39 Bobby Walden	Reserve: 53 Henry Davis LB (IR); 33 John Fuqua RB (IR); Rookies in italics 47 active, 2 reserve

== 1974 schedules ==
=== Preseason schedule ===
Week	Date	Opponent	Result	Record	Venue
1	August 3	at New Orleans Saints	**W** 26–7	1–0	Tulane Stadium
2	August 12	Chicago Bears	**W** 50–21	2–0	Three Rivers Stadium
3	August 17	at Philadelphia Eagles	**W** 33–30_{(OT)}	3–0	Veterans Stadium
4	August 24	New York Giants	**W** 17–7	4–0	Three Rivers Stadium
5	August 30	at Washington Redskins	**W** 21–19	5–0	RFK Stadium
6	September 5	Dallas Cowboys	**W** 41–15	6–0	Texas Stadium

=== Regular season schedule ===
Week	Date	Opponent	TV	Result	Record	Venue
1	September 15	Baltimore Colts	NBC	**W** 30–0	1–0	Three Rivers Stadium
2	September 22	at Denver Broncos	NBC	**T** 35–35_{(OT)}	1–0–1	Mile High Stadium
3	September 29	Oakland Raiders	NBC	**L** 0–17	1–1–1	Three Rivers Stadium
4	October 6	at **Houston Oilers**	NBC	**W** 13–7	2–1–1	Astrodome
5	October 13	at Kansas City Chiefs	NBC	**W** 34–24	3–1–1	Arrowhead Stadium
6	October 20	**Cleveland Browns**	NBC	**W** 20–16	4–1–1	Three Rivers Stadium
7	October 28	Atlanta Falcons	ABC	**W** 24–17	5–1–1	Three Rivers Stadium
8	November 3	Philadelphia Eagles	CBS	**W** 27–0	6–1–1	Three Rivers Stadium
9	November 10	at **Cincinnati Bengals**	NBC	**L** 10–17	6–2–1	Riverfront Stadium
10	November 17	at **Cleveland Browns**	NBC	**W** 26–16	7–2–1	Cleveland Municipal Stadium
11	November 25	at New Orleans Saints	ABC	**W** 28–7	8–2–1	Tulane Stadium
12	December 1	**Houston Oilers**	NBC	**L** 10–13	8–3–1	Three Rivers Stadium
13	December 8	at New England Patriots	NBC	**W** 21–17	9–3–1	Schaefer Stadium
14	December 14	**Cincinnati Bengals**	NBC	**W** 27–3	10–3–1	Three Rivers Stadium
Note: Intra-division opponents are in **bold** text.

=== Postseason schedule ===
Week	Date	Opponent	TV	Result	Record	Venue
Divisional	December 22	**Buffalo Bills**	NBC	**W** 32–14	11–3–1	Three Rivers Stadium
AFC Championship	December 29	at Oakland Raiders	NBC	**W** 24–13	12–3–1	Oakland Coliseum
Super Bowl IX	January 12	Minnesota Vikings	NBC	**W** 16–6	13–3–1	Old Tulane Stadium

=== Standings ===
AFC Central
	W	L	T	PCT	DIV	CONF	PF	PA	STK
Pittsburgh Steelers	10	3	1	.750	4–2	7–3–1	305	189	W2
Houston Oilers	7	7	0	.500	4–2	7–4	236	282	W1
Cincinnati Bengals	7	7	0	.500	3–3	5–6	283	259	L3
Cleveland Browns	4	10	0	.286	1–5	3–8	251	344	L2

== Game summaries ==
=== Week 1 (Sunday, September 15, 1974): vs. Baltimore Colts ===
Week 1: Baltimore Colts (0–1) at Pittsburgh Steelers (1–0)

Quarter	1	2	3	4	Total
Colts (0–1)	0	0	0	0	0
Steelers (1–0)	3	13	7	7	30

at Three Rivers Stadium • Pittsburgh, Pennsylvania

- Date: September 15, 1974
- Game time: 1:00 p.m. EDT
- Game weather: 72 °F or 22.2 °C, relative humidity 69%, wind 9 miles per hour (14 km/h; 7.8 kn) (Partly Cloudy)
- Game attendance: 48,890
- Referee: Gordon McCarter
- TV announcers (NBC): Jay Randolph (play by play) and Paul Maguire (color commentator)

Team	Category	Player	Statistics
BAL	Passing	Bert Jones	8/17, 100 YDS, 2 INTs
BAL	Rushing	Lydell Mitchell	9 CAR, 44 YDS
BAL	Receiving	Glenn Doughty	3 CAR, 58 YDS
PIT	Passing	Joe Gilliam	18/37, 289 YDS, 2 TDs, 1 INT
PIT	Rushing	Franco Harris	13 CAR, 49 YDS, 1 TD
PIT	Receiving	Randy Grossman	3 REC, 52 YDS

Scoring summary

Quarter	Time	Drive			Team	Scoring information	Score	
Quarter	Time	Plays	Yards	TOP	Team	Scoring information	BAL	PIT
1					Steelers	31-yard field goal by Gerela	0	3
2					Steelers	Swann 61-yard touchdown reception from Gilliam, Gerela kick no good	0	9
2					Steelers	Lewis 4-yard touchdown reception from Gilliam, Gerela kick good	0	16
3					Steelers	Harris 4-yard touchdown run, Gerela kick good	0	23
4					Steelers	Fuqua 4-yard touchdown run, Gerela kick good	0	30
"TOP" = time of possession. For other American football terms, see Glossary of American football.							0	30

- Point spread:
- Over/under:
- Time of game: 0 hours, 0 minutes

Colts	Game statistics	Steelers
11	First downs	18
34–118	Rushes–yards	29–103
102	Passing yards	289
9–20–2	Passes	18–37–1
6–54	Sacked–yards	0–0
48	Net passing yards	289
166	Total yards	392
98	Return yards	73
8–33.3	Punts	4–45.5
3–2	Fumbles–lost	3–1
3–20	Penalties–yards	4–32

In week 1, the Steelers started #17 Joe Gilliam as he completed 17 of his 31 passes for 257 yards, 2 TDs, and an interception. Gilliam became the first African-American quarterback in league history to play in a game as the designated opening-day starter. The defense held Baltimore to 166 total yards and forced 4 turnovers in the shutout win.

=== Week 2 (Sunday, September 22, 1974): at Denver Broncos ===
Week 2: Pittsburgh Steelers (1–0–1) at Denver Broncos (0–1–1)

Quarter	1	2	3	4	OT	Total
Steelers (1–0–1)	7	7	14	7	0	35
Broncos (0–1–1)	21	0	7	7	0	35

at Mile High Stadium • Denver, Colorado

- Date: September 22, 1974
- Game time: 4:00 p.m. EDT
- Game weather: 57 °F or 13.9 °C, relative humidity 48%, wind 7 miles per hour (11 km/h; 6.1 kn) (Sunny)
- Game attendance: 51,068
- Referee: Tommy Bell
- TV announcers (NBC): Jay Randolph (play by play) and Paul Maguire (color commentator)

Team	Category	Player	Statistics
PIT	Passing	Joe Gilliam	31/50, 348 YDS, 1 TD, 2 INTs
PIT	Rushing	Franco Harris	20 CAR, 70 YDS
PIT	Receiving	Franco Harris	9 REC, 84 YDS
DEN	Passing	Charley Johnson	6/15, 129 YDS, 2 TDs, 1 INT
DEN	Rushing	Otis Armstrong	19 CAR, 131 YDS
DEN	Receiving	Otis Armstrong	5 REC, 86 YDS, 2 TDs

Scoring summary

Quarter	Time	Drive			Team	Scoring information	Score	
Quarter	Time	Plays	Yards	TOP	Team	Scoring information	PIT	DEN
1	11:10	1	45	0:07	Broncos	Armstrong 45-yard touchdown reception from Johnson, Turner kick good	0	7
1	9:52	3	73	1:18	Steelers	Davis 61-yard touchdown reception from Gilliam, Gerela kick good	7	7
1	7:07	8	59	2:45	Broncos	Moses 7-yard touchdown reception from Johnson, Turner kick good	7	14
1	5:44	1	1	0:07	Broncos	Keyworth 1-yard touchdown run, Turner kick good	7	21
2	0:52	17	87	8:06	Steelers	Gilliam 1-yard touchdown run, Gerela kick good	14	21
3	9:36	7	37	4:24	Steelers	Davis 1-yard touchdown run, Gerela kick good	21	21
3	3:12	3	41	1:41	Broncos	Odoms 3-yard touchdown reception from Ramsey, Turner kick good	21	28
3	0:07	6	73	3:05	Steelers	Davis 1-yard touchdown run, Gerela kick good	28	28
4	13:01	4	16	1:48	Steelers	Fuqua 1-yard touchdown run, Gerela kick good	35	28
4	7:08	3	50	2:21	Broncos	Armstrong 23-yard touchdown reception from Ramsey, Turner kick good	35	35
"TOP" = time of possession. For other American football terms, see Glossary of American football.							35	35

- Point spread:
- Over/under:
- Time of game: 3 hours, 7 minutes

Steelers	Game statistics	Broncos
33	First downs	20
40–160	Rushes–yards	37–156
348	Passing yards	191
31–50–2	Passes	12–27–2
3–24	Sacked–yards	3–15
324	Net passing yards	176
484	Total yards	332
121	Return yards	145
6–41.7	Punts	7–44.4
3–2	Fumbles–lost	1–1
12–91	Penalties–yards	7–61

In week 2, the Steelers were carried to a 35–35 OT tie with #32 Franco Harris' running game and #17 Joe Gilliam's 348 passing yards. It was the first regular season overtime game in NFL history. Denver coach John Ralston said of Gilliam that "it was possibly the finest performance I have ever seen by a quarterback."

Game Summaries

week 3: vs. Oakland Raiders

Oakland Raiders (1–1) at Pittsburgh Steelers (1–0–1)

Quarter	1	2	3	4	Total
Raiders	7	10	0	0	17
Steelers	0	0	0	0	0

at Three Rivers Stadium, Pittsburgh, Pennsylvania

- Date: Sunday, September 29
- Game time: 4 p.m., ET
- Game weather: 66 °F or 18.9 °C (Light Rain)
- Game attendance: 48,304
- Referee: Pat Haggerty
- TV: NBC

Game information
- Oakland – Stabler 1 run (Blanda kick) 0–7
- Oakland – Branch 19 pass from Stabler (Blanda kick) 0–14
- Oakland – FG Blanda 35 0–17

In week 3, after 2 brilliant games by #17 Joe Gilliam, the Raiders came to Pittsburgh for a rematch of the 1973 Divisional Round Playoff game in which Oakland won. However, a fluttering Gilliam completed 10 of his 31 passed which laid the first defeat on Pittsburgh. To make things worse, #32 Franco Harris was injured and would miss the next 2 games. Damp and dark weather hung over the stadium and Terry Bradshaw's relief of Gilliam with a little under 2 minutes left in the game drew cheers from remaining fans. (1–1–1)

week 4: at Houston Oilers

Pittsburgh Steelers (1–1–1) at Houston Oilers (1–2–1)

Quarter	1	2	3	4	Total
Steelers	0	3	3	7	13
Oilers	0	7	0	0	7

at Houston Astrodome, Houston, Texas

- Date: Sunday, October 6
- Game time: 2 p.m., ET
- Game weather: Dome (indoors)
- Game attendance: 30,049
- Referee: Bob Frederic
- TV: NBC

Game information
- Houston – B. Johnson 47 run (Butler kick) 0–7
- Pittsburgh – FG Gerela 37 3–7
- Pittsburgh – FG Gerela 27 6–7
- Pittsburgh – Pearson 9 run (Gerela kick) 13–7

In week 4, the Steelers recovered from the loss at home by beating Houston. #17 Joe Gilliam didn't recover completely; he threw for only 202 yards and 2 interceptions. However, on the game's lone touchdown drive, Gilliam completed 4 consecutive passes. Without #32 Franco Harris, the offense would continuously fall apart. (2–1–1)

week 5: at Kansas City Chiefs

Pittsburgh Steelers (2–1–1) at Kansas City Chiefs (2–2)

Quarter	1	2	3	4	Total
Steelers	7	17	10	0	34
Chiefs	3	7	7	7	24

at Arrowhead Stadium, Kansas City, Missouri

- Date: Sunday, October 13
- Game time: 2 p.m., ET
- Game weather: 55 °F or 12.8 °C
- Game attendance: 65,517
- Referee: Bernie Ulman
- TV: NBC

Game information
- Kansas City – FG Stenerud 31 0–3
- Pittsburgh – Bleier 2 run (Gerela kick) 7–3
- Kansas City – Pearson 13 pass from Livingston (Stenerud kick) 7–10
- Pittsburgh – Pearson 3 run (Gerela kick) 14–10
- Pittsburgh – Edwards 49 interception return (Gerela kick) 21–10
- Pittsburgh – FG Gerela 32 24–10
- Kansas City – Taylor 10 pass from Livingston (Stenerud kick) 24–17
- Pittsburgh – FG Gerela 45 27–17
- Pittsburgh – Lewis 31 pass from Gilliam (Gerela kick) 34–17
- Kansas City – Wright 13 pass from Livingston (Stenerud kick) 34–24

In week 5, the Steelers came away from Kansas City with a 10-point win, 34–24, behind #27 Glen Edwards' 49-yard interception return. The Chiefs used a combined three quarterbacks to throw 7 interceptions. However, #17 Joe Gilliam's play was still deteriorating, and after the horrible performance in next week's game he was benched. (3–1–1)

week 6: vs. Cleveland Browns

Cleveland Browns (1–4) at Pittsburgh Steelers (3–1–1)

Quarter	1	2	3	4	Total
Browns	0	13	0	3	16
Steelers	7	7	3	3	20

at Three Rivers Stadium, Pittsburgh, Pennsylvania

- Date: Sunday, October 20
- Game time: 1 p.m., ET
- Game weather: 42 °F or 5.6 °C (Cloudy)
- Game attendance: 48,100
- Referee: Ben Dreith
- TV: NBC

Game information
- Pittsburgh – Pearson 6 run (Gerela kick) 7–0
- Pittsburgh – Harris 1 run (Gerela kick) 14–0
- Cleveland – Phipps 18 run (Cockroft kick) 14–7
- Cleveland – Morin 9 pass from Phipps (kick blocked) 14–13
- Pittsburgh – FG Gerela 31 17–13
- Cleveland – FG Cockroft 21 17–16
- Pittsburgh – FG Gerela 26 20–16

In week 6, the Steelers offense continued to flutter with #17 Joe Gilliam's 5 out of 18 and 78 yard passing performance (despite the return of #32 Franco Harris). In the 3 games after the loss to Oakland, the defense forced 15 turnovers, and that is how the Steelers managed to win all 3 games. The front four of #78 Dwight White, #63 Ernie Holmes, #75 Joe Greene, and #68 L. C. Greenwood had become dominant. Together, they became known as the Steel Curtain. After 6 games, the Steelers were 4–1–1, however, the offense was going to need some help if they were to become a contender. In week 7, the Steelers found that help. (4–1–1)

week 7: vs. Atlanta Falcons

Atlanta Falcons (2–4) at Pittsburgh Steelers (4–1–1)

Quarter	1	2	3	4	Total
Falcons	0	14	0	3	17
Steelers	14	0	3	7	24

at Three Rivers Stadium, Pittsburgh, Pennsylvania

- Date: Monday, October 28
- Game time: 9 p.m., ET
- Game weather: 55 °F or 12.8 °C (Clear)
- Game attendance: 48,094
- Referee: Jim Tunney
- TV: ABC

Game information
- Pittsburgh – Bleier 10 run (Gerela kick) 7–0
- Pittsburgh – Bradshaw 1 run (Gerela kick) 14–0
- Atlanta – Dodd 9 pass from Lee (Mike-Mayer kick) 14–7
- Atlanta – Burrow 24 pass from Lee (Mike-Mayer kick) 14–14
- Pittsburgh – FG Gerela 33 17–14
- Pittsburgh – Harris 7 run (Gerela kick) 24–14
- Atlanta – FG Mike-Mayer 32 24–17

In week 7, #12 Terry Bradshaw replaced the failing #17 Joe Gilliam. By 1974, the 5-year veteran was known as the unpredictable and inconsistent quarterback of the Pittsburgh Steelers. He was often overlooked by fans and coaches for making mistakes. It was at this time Bradshaw was going through some emotional problems. He had lost his starting job and fans and players continuously doubted and sometimes mocked him. A failing relationship with his head coach continued to decline. He was often in seclusion at his home as well. Yet, his team did miss him after he watched the first 6 games from the sidelines. However, on a Monday night against Atlanta, Bradshaw returned. The backfield that would start 4 of the next 6 Super Bowls was finally in place. Runningbacks #32 Franco Harris and #20 Rocky Bleier combined for over 200 yards rushing as the Steelers rolled to a 24–17 win. (5–1–1)

week 8: vs. Philadelphia Eagles

Philadelphia Eagles (4–3) at Pittsburgh Steelers (5–1–1)

Quarter	1	2	3	4	Total
Eagles	0	0	0	0	0
Steelers	7	10	10	0	27

at Three Rivers Stadium, Pittsburgh, Pennsylvania

- Date: Sunday, November 3
- Game time: 1 p.m., ET
- Game weather: 71 °F or 21.7 °C (Light Rain)
- Game attendance: 47,996
- Referee: Tommy Bell
- TV: CBS

Game information
- Pittsburgh – Lewis 8 pass from Bradshaw (Gerela kick) 7–0
- Pittsburgh – Harris 5 run (Gerela kick) 14–0
- Pittsburgh – FG Gerela 35 17–0
- Pittsburgh – FG Gerela 28 20–0
- Pittsburgh – Blount 52 interception return (Gerela kick) 27–0

In week 8, the Steelers won behind another shutout by the defense that included a 52-yard interception return by #47 Mel Blount. It was one of two career interceptions returned for touchdowns by the Hall of Famer. #12 Terry Bradshaw was still a colt who had not yet been broken; Chuck Noll's patience with him continued to disappear. (5–1–1)

week 9: at Cincinnati Bengals

Pittsburgh Steelers (6–1–1) at Cincinnati Bengals (5–3)

Quarter	1	2	3	4	Total
Steelers	0	3	0	7	10
Bengals	0	10	7	0	17

at Riverfront Stadium, Cincinnati, Ohio

- Date: Sunday, November 10
- Game time: 4 p.m., ET
- Game weather: 48 °F or 8.9 °C
- Game attendance: 57,532
- Referee: Norm Schachter
- TV: NBC

Game information
- Cincinnati – Williams 2 run (Muhlmann kick) 0–7
- Cincinnati – FG Muhlmann 30 0–10
- Pittsburgh – FG Gerela 24 3–10
- Cincinnati – Williams 1 run (Muhlmann kick) 3–17
- Pittsburgh – Pearson 1 run (Gerela kick) 10–17

In week 9, the Steelers lost to division rival Cincinnati, 17–10. The offense was again struggling, and #12 Terry Bradshaw was benched again, in favor of 5-year veteran #5 Terry Hanratty. (5–2–1)

week 10: at Cleveland Browns

Pittsburgh Steelers (6–2–1) at Cleveland Browns (3–6)

Quarter	1	2	3	4	Total
Steelers	7	6	0	13	26
Browns	3	3	10	0	16

at Cleveland Municipal Stadium, Cleveland, Ohio

- Date: Sunday, November 17
- Game time: 1 p.m., ET
- Game weather: 42 °F or 5.6 °C
- Game attendance: 77,195
- Referee: Fred Silva
- TV: NBC

Game information
- Cleveland – FG Cockroft 44 0–3
- Pittsburgh – Shanklin 28 pass from Hanratty (Gerela kick) 7–3
- Pittsburgh – FG Gerela 32 10–3
- Cleveland – FG Cockroft 35 10–6
- Pittsburgh – FG Gerela 32 13–6
- Cleveland – Green 36 interception return (Cockroft kick) 13–13
- Cleveland – FG Cockroft 18 13–16
- Pittsburgh – FG Gerela 23 16–16
- Pittsburgh – Thomas 14 fumble recovery return (Gerela kick) 23–16
- Pittsburgh – FG Gerela 22 26–16

In this week 10 matchup, the Steelers defeated the hosting Browns team for the first time in Cleveland since 1964. However, #5 Terry Hanratty completed only 2 of his passes and threw 3 interceptions. He was relieved by Gilliam, and the quarterback controversy had become a real problem for Pittsburgh. However, the rest of the team was playing at a championship level following this madcap game. The turning point came on a miscue in the Browns backfield. Cleveland quarterback Brian Sipe collided with Billy Lefear on the handoff and the ball squirted loose. #74 Joe Greene barged in, grabbed the ball and looked to his left where J.T. Thomas was coming up fast. Greene flipped him the ball and Thomas ran it in from 14 yards out. Earlier in the game, Greene intercepted Sipe and rumbled down to the 14, setting up a Roy Gerela field goal. #32 Franco Harris ran for 156 yards and the defense forced 6 turnovers (overcoming 7 of their own) as the Steelers rallied to defeat the Browns and remain in first place in the AFC Central. (7–2–1)

week 11: at New Orleans Saints

Pittsburgh Steelers (7–2–1) at New Orleans Saints (4–6)

Quarter	1	2	3	4	Total
Steelers	7	7	14	0	28
Saints	0	0	7	0	7

at Tulane Stadium, New Orleans, Louisiana

- Date: Monday, November 25
- Game time: 9 p.m., ET
- Game weather: 56 °F or 13.3 °C
- Game attendance: 69,010
- Referee: Ben Dreith
- TV: ABC

Game information
- Pittsburgh – Lewis 31 pass from Bradshaw (Gerela kick) 7–0
- Pittsburgh – Bradshaw 18 run (Gerela kick) 14–0
- Pittsburgh – Swann 64 punt return (Gerela kick) 21–0
- New Orleans – Seal 10 pass from Scott (McClard kick) 21–7
- Pittsburgh – Brown 1 pass from Bradshaw (Gerela kick) 28–7

In week 11, #12 Terry Bradshaw was welcomed back into the lineup after the performance by #5 Terry Hanratty. However, in this 28–7 win over the Saints, Bradshaw ran for more yards (99) than he passed (80). In less than two months, Super Bowl IX was going to be played on the same field. (8–2–1)

week 12: vs. Houston Oilers

Houston Oilers (5–6) at Pittsburgh Steelers (8–2–1)

Quarter	1	2	3	4	Total
Oilers	0	7	3	3	13
Steelers	3	7	0	0	10

at Three Rivers Stadium, Pittsburgh, Pennsylvania

- Date: Sunday, December 1
- Game time: 1 p.m., ET
- Game weather: 38 °F or 3.3 °C (Light Rain)
- Game attendance: 41,195
- Referee: Dick Jorgensen
- TV: NBC

Game information
- Pittsburgh – FG Gerela 44 3–0
- Houston – Willis 6 pass from Pastorini (Butler kick) 7–3
- Pittsburgh – Harris 31 pass from Bradshaw (Gerela kick) 10–7
- Houston – FG Butler 42 10–10
- Houston – FG Butler 34 10–13

In week 12, #75 Joe Greene was allowed to use his new technique called the "Stunt 4–3." He would jump in the gap between the guard and the center, and then blow through the gap. Teams were forced to commit so many blockers to Greene, that his teammates often went unblocked. However, this still couldn't stop the lowly Oilers from beating them 13–10. (8–3–1)

week 13: at New England Patriots

Pittsburgh Steelers (8–3–1) at New England Patriots (7–5)

Quarter	1	2	3	4	Total
Steelers	0	12	7	2	21
Patriots	7	3	0	7	17

at Schaefer Stadium, Foxboro, Massachusetts

- Date: Sunday, December 8
- Game time: 1 p.m., ET
- Game weather: 50 °F or 10 °C
- Game attendance: 52,107
- Referee: Jim Tunney
- TV: NBC
- Pro-Football-Reference.com

Game information
- New England – Herron 17 pass from Plunkett (Smith kick)0–7
- Pittsburgh – FG Gerela 40 3–7
- Pittsburgh – Harris 2 run (kick blocked) 9–7
- Pittsburgh – FG Gerela 27 12–7
- New England – FG Smith 20 12–10
- Pittsburgh – Swann 7 pass from Bradshaw (Gerela kick) 19–10
- Pittsburgh – Safety, Greenwood tackled Plunkett in end zone 21–10
- New England – Herron 5 run (Smith kick)21–17

In week 13, #75 Joe Greene became frustrated and threatened to quit the Steelers after losing to the Oilers the previous week and was pushed even further the next night (Dec. 2) when the Dolphins beat the Bengals on Monday Night Football. However, he returned for the most important game of the season in New England. With the win, the Steelers would win the division, as well as clinch their third straight playoff berth. The players were nervous and tense, however, the Steelers made quick work of the Patriots, 21–17. The Steeler offense was finally clicking. (9–3–1)

week 14: vs. Cincinnati Bengals

Cincinnati Bengals (7–6) at Pittsburgh Steelers (9–3–1)

Quarter	1	2	3	4	Total
Bengals	0	0	3	0	3
Steelers	7	10	7	3	27

at Three Rivers Stadium, Pittsburgh, Pennsylvania

- Date: Saturday, December 14
- Game time: 1 p.m., ET
- Game weather: 37 °F or 2.8 °C (Drizzle)
- Game attendance: 42,878
- Referee: Bernie Ulman
- TV: NBC

Game information
- Pittsburgh – Stallworth 5 pass from Bradshaw (Gerela kick) 7–0
- Pittsburgh – Mullins 7 pass from Bradshaw (Gerela kick) 14–0
- Pittsburgh – FG Gerela 26 17–0
- Cincinnati – FG Muhlmann 32 17–3
- Pittsburgh – Harris on 1 run (Gerela kick) 24–3
- Pittsburgh – FG Gerela 42 27–3

In week 14, the Steelers beat the Bengals in a meaningless game with their offense rolling and their defense dominating. (10–3–1)

== Stats ==
Passing

Passing
Player	Pos	G	GS	QBrec	Cmp	Att	Cmp%	Yds	TD	TD%	Int	Int%	Y/A	AY/A	Y/C	Y/G	Lng	Rate	Sk	Yds	NY/A	ANY/A	Sk%	4QC	GWD
Gilliam	QB	9	6	4–1–1	96	212	45.3	1274	4	1.9	8	3.8	61	6.0	4.7	13.3	141.6	55.4	7	79	5.46	4.18	3.2	1	1
Bradshaw	QB	8	7	5–2–0	67	148	45.3	785	7	4.7	8	5.4	56	5.3	3.8	11.7	98.1	55.2	10	104	4.31	2.92	6.3		
Hanratty	QB	3	1	1–0–0	3	26	11.5	95	1	3.8	5	19.2	35	3.7	-4.2	31.7	31.7	15.5	1	13	3.04	-4.56	3.7	1	0
Team Total		14		10–3–1	166	386	43	2154	12	3.1	21	5.4	61	5.6	3.8	13.0	153.9	48.9	18	196	4.5	4.85	3.10	2	1
Opp Total		14			147	339	43.4	1872	14	4.1	25	7.4		5.5	3.03	12.7	133.7	44.3	52	406	13.3	3.7	1.6		

Rushing

Rushing
Player	Pos	G	GS	Att	Yds	TD	Lng	Y/A	Y/G	A/G

Receiving

Receiving
Player	Pos	G	GS	Rec	Yds	Y/R	TD	Lng	R/G	Y/G	Ctch%

Kicking

Kicking
		Games		0–19		20–29		30–39		40–49		50+		Scoring						
Player	Pos	G	GS	FGA	FGM	FGA	FGM	FGA	FGM	FGA	FGM	FGA	FGM	FGA	FGM	Lng	FG%	XPA	XPM	XP%

Punting

Punting
Player	Pos	G	GS	Pnt	Yds	Lng	Blck	Y/P

Kick Return

Kick return

Punt Return

Punt return

Sacks

Sacks
Player	Pos	G	GS	Sk

Interceptions

Interceptions

Fumbles

Fumbles

Tackles

Tackles

Scoring Summary

Scoring Summary

Team

Team
			Total Yds & TO					Passing							Rushing					Penalties		
Player	PF	Yds	Ply	Y/P	TO	FL	1stD	Cmp	Att	Yds	TD	Int	NY/A	1stD	Att	Yds	TD	Y/A	1stD	Pen	Yds	1stPy
Team Stats	305	4375	950	4.6	40	19	251	166	386	1958	12	21	4.8	98	546	2417	19	4.4	136	104	978	17
Opp. Stats	189	3074	863	3.6	47	22	200	147	339	1466	14	25	3.7	83	472	1608	7	3.4	87	76	575	30
Lg Rank Offense	6	8			24	25	9		10	21	15	14	20		4	2	5	4				
Lg Rank Defense	2	1			1	1	3		6	1	13	3	1		12	6	2	4				

Quarter-by-quarter

Quarter-by-quarter
Team	1	2	3	4	OT	T
Steelers	69	102	78	56	0	305
Opponents	41	74	44	30	0	189

== Postseason summary ==
=== Divisional (December 22, 1974): vs. Buffalo Bills ===
AFC Divisional Playoff: Buffalo Bills (9–5) at Pittsburgh Steelers (10–3–1)

Quarter	1	2	3	4	Total
Bills	7	0	7	0	14
Steelers	3	26	0	3	32

at Three Rivers Stadium, Pittsburgh, Pennsylvania

- Date: December 22
- Game time: 1:00 p.m.
- Game weather: Light snow, 33 °F (1 °C)
- Game attendance: 48,321
- Referee: Norm Schachter
- TV announcers (NBC): Jim Simpson and John Brodie
- Box Score

Game information

First quarter

- PIT – Roy Gerela 21-yard field goal. Steelers 3–0.
- BUF – Paul Seymour 22-yard pass from Joe Ferguson (John Leypoldt kick). Bills 7–3.

Second quarter

- PIT – Rocky Bleier 27-yard pass from Terry Bradshaw. Steelers 9–7.
- PIT – Franco Harris 1-yard run (Roy Gerela kick). Steelers 16–7.
- PIT – Franco Harris 4-yard run. Steelers 22–7.
- PIT – Franco Harris 1-yard run (Roy Gerela kick). Steelers 29–7.

Third quarter

- BUF – O. J. Simpson 3-yard pass from Joe Ferguson (John Leypoldt kick). Steelers 29–14.

Fourth quarter

- PIT – Roy Gerela 22-yard field goal. Steelers 32–14.

Top passers

- BUF – Joe Ferguson – 11/26, 164 yards, 2 TD
- PIT – Terry Bradshaw – 12/19, 203 yards, TD

Top rushers

- BUF – O. J. Simpson – 15 rushes, 49 yards
- PIT – Franco Harris – 24 rushes, 74 yards, 3 TD

Top receivers

- BUF – J.D. Hill – 4 receptions, 59 yards
- PIT – Lynn Swann – 3 receptions, 60 yards

In this Divisional Round playoff game, the Steelers were described as the only team in the playoffs without a quarterback and were expected to lose at home to Buffalo. The last time the Steelers faced the Bills, O. J. Simpson had rushed for 189 yards and the defense was concerned about him. However, by halftime the Steelers had dominated the line of scrimmage and the offense took time away from the Bills as the Steelers went up 29–7. #12 Terry Bradshaw was in the best game of his career. By the end of the game, O. J. was held to 49 yards rushing in his only playoff game of his career. After three weeks of solid performance by everyone, the Steelers were ready to rematch the Oakland Raiders in the AFC Championship Game.

=== AFC Championship Game (Sunday, December 29, 1974): at Oakland Raiders ===
AFC Championship Game: Pittsburgh Steelers (12–3–1) at Oakland Raiders (13–3)

Quarter	1	2	3	4	Total
Steelers (12–3–1)	0	3	0	21	24
Raiders (13–3)	3	0	7	3	13

at Oakland–Alameda County Coliseum • Oakland, California

- Date: December 29, 1974
- Game time: 4:00 p.m. EST
- Game weather: 53 °F or 11.7 °C, Partly cloudy
- Game attendance: 53,515
- Referee: Jim Tunney
- TV announcers (NBC): Curt Gowdy, Al DeRogatis, and Don Meredith

In the 1974 AFC Championship Game, all the hype was centered around the Raiders who had ended Miami's reign in stunning a play that went into NFL Lore as the "Sea of Hands". Raiders coach, John Madden however went a little too far in his praising of both teams when he said that when the two best teams in professional football get together, Miami Dolphins and the Oakland Raiders, great things will happen. Steelers stoic head coach Chuck Noll galvanized the team's spirit by making an unexpected comment. He said that the best team in the NFL was the team in this room. The Steelers would dominate the Raiders in Oakland by using the Stunt 4–3 and stopping the great Oakland offensive line. The Steelers rushed for over 200 yards as the Raiders rushed for a mere 29. Franco Harris ran for the final touchdown and sealed the first Super Bowl appearance in Steelers' history. This game would set the tone for what to come for the rest of the decade. |-

=== Super Bowl IX (January 12, 1975): vs. Minnesota Vikings ===
Pittsburgh Steelers 16, Minnesota Vikings 6

Quarter	1	2	3	4	Total
Steelers	0	2	7	7	16
Vikings	0	0	0	6	6

at Tulane Stadium, New Orleans, Louisiana

- Date: Sunday, January 12
- Game time: 3:00 pm EST
- Game weather: Overcast, 51 °F or 10.6 °C, wind 17 mph, relative humidity 72%
- Game attendance: 80,997
- Referee: Bernie Ulman
- TV announcers (NBC): Curt Gowdy, Al DeRogatis, and Don Meredith
- Pro-Football-Reference.com

Game information
- Pittsburgh – Safety: Dwight White downed Fran Tarkenton in end zone 2–0 PIT
- Pittsburgh – TD: Franco Harris 9 yard run (Roy Gerela kick) 9–0 PIT
- Minnesota – TD: Terry Brown recovered blocked punt in end zone (kick failed) 9–6 PIT
- Pittsburgh – TD: Larry Brown 4 yard pass from Terry Bradshaw (Roy Gerela kick) 16–6 PIT

Approaching Super Bowl IX, Chuck Noll told his team to go out with no bed check and get the town out of their system. The team had a good time in New Orleans (everyone but #78 Dwight White, who was sick and in the hospital). By Wednesday, they were begging for a bed check. However, that time he gave them and the subsequent responsible attitude was a wonderful way to approach the big game. Noll's approach was in direct contrast to that of Vikings' head coach Bud Grant who had been to two previous Super Bowls, both of which the Vikings lost. The Vikings didn't have a relaxed atmosphere; they were very tense compared to the chilled and relaxed Steelers. Despite the trip to the hospital, #78 Dwight White played and scored the first points in the defensive battle on the first safety in Super Bowl history. The Steelers shut down the Minnesota run game that wanted to attack their opponent's strength the way the Steelers had against Oakland and Buffalo. The Vikings ran 20 times for 17 yards and #10 QB Fran Tarkenton completed just 11 of his 27 passes and threw three interceptions (1 to #75 Joe Greene though he didn't run very far). #32 Franco Harris ran farther than anyone ever had in the Super Bowl to that point, setting a record with 158 yards rushing. He was named the game's Most Valuable Player. The Steelers became champions for the first time in their 42-year history when #12 Terry Bradshaw threw a strike to #87 Larry Brown for a TD.

== Awards, honors and records ==
- #75 Joe Greene, National Football League Defensive Player of the Year Award
- #32 Franco Harris, Super Bowl Most Valuable Player
- Most Hall of Famers selected in one draft
- #58 Jack Lambert, NFL Defensive Rookie of the Year
- #88 Lynn Swann leader in punt return yards (577)
