= Joe Gilliam =

American football player (1950–2000)

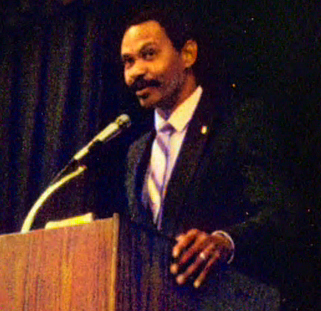
- Gilliam in 1987

No. 17
- Position: Quarterback

Personal information
- Born: December 29, 1950; Charleston, West Virginia, U.S.
- Died: December 25, 2000 (aged 49); Nashville, Tennessee, U.S.
- Listed height: 6 ft 2 in (1.88 m)
- Listed weight: 187 lb (85 kg)

Career information
- High school: Pearl (Nashville, Tennessee)
- College: Tennessee State
- NFL draft: 1972: 11th round, 273rd overall pick

Career history
- Pittsburgh Steelers (1972–1975); New Orleans Saints (1976–1977)*; Pittsburgh Wolf Pak (1978); Baltimore Eagles (1979); New Orleans Blue Knights (1981); Denver Gold (1983)*; Washington Federals (1983)
- * Offseason or practice squad member only

Awards and highlights
- 2× Super Bowl champion (IX, X); Second-team Little All-American (1971)

Career NFL statistics
- Passing attempts: 331
- Passing completions: 147
- Completion percentage: 44.4%
- TD–INT: 9–17
- Passing yards: 2,103
- Passer rating: 53.2
- Stats at Pro Football Reference

Joseph Wiley Gilliam Jr. (December 29, 1950 – December 25, 2000) was an American professional football player, a quarterback with the Pittsburgh Steelers of the National Football League (NFL) for four seasons. Primarily a backup, he started the first six games of the 1974 season.

He became the Steelers' starting quarterback in 1974, making history as the first African American quarterback to start a season opener. Despite a strong start, he was benched midseason, leading to Terry Bradshaw reclaiming the starting role. Gilliam remained on the roster through the Steelers' Super Bowl X victory but was waived before the 1976 season. His post-NFL career was marred by struggles with substance abuse and legal issues, including arrests and homelessness. He played in various semi-pro leagues and briefly returned to professional football with the USFL's Washington Federals in 1983. Gilliam retired in 1984 and was later inducted into the American Football Association's Semi-Pro Football Hall of Fame in 1986.

== Early life ==
Gilliam was born in Charleston, West Virginia, the third of four children of Ruth and Joe Gilliam Sr. He grew up in Nashville, Tennessee, and spent many hours on the campus of Tennessee A&I State University (renamed Tennessee State University in 1968), where his father was the defensive coordinator for the Tigers football team.

Gilliam displayed his own athletic abilities at a young age, beginning at Washington Junior High School, where he participated in tumbling, track, and basketball. In 1966, he became the starting quarterback at Pearl High School and led the squad when they played in the city's first season of integrated football. While in high school, Gilliam kept close to the Tigers program as a ball boy for home games.

While at Tennessee State, he played under legendary coach John Merritt. He was an All-American his junior and senior seasons. In 1970, the Tigers went 10-0 and played in the now defunct Grantland Rice Bowl played in Baton Rouge, Louisiana. Gilliam passed for two touchdowns, and ran for a third, as Tennessee State defeated Southwestern Louisiana 26–25. They were named Black College National Champions. Gilliam's senior season saw a repeat of accolades. He was named All-American, and the Tigers returned to Baton Rouge. With an 8–1 record, the Tigers faced McNeese State. Trailing 16–6, Gilliam threw two touchdown passes to John Holland to take a 19–16 lead. A third touchdown pass to Ollie Smith clinched a 26–23 victory. Gilliam's teammate at Tennessee State was Ed "Too Tall" Jones.

== Professional career ==
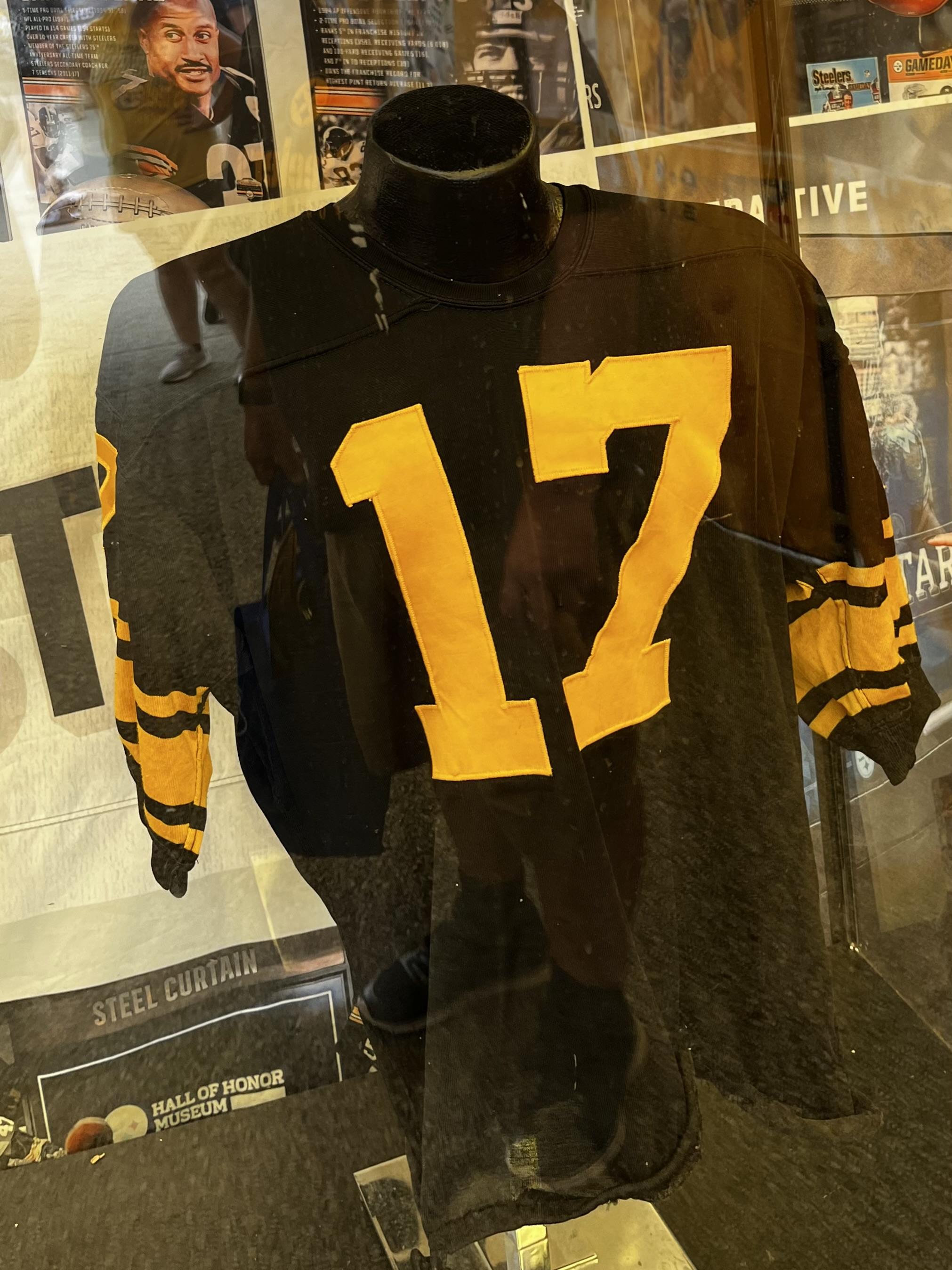
Game worn jersey of Gilliam's on display at Steelers training camp in 2024

Gilliam was selected by the Pittsburgh Steelers in the 11th round of the 1972 NFL draft, the 273rd overall pick. His first NFL game came on November 5, 1972, when he came on in relief of Terry Bradshaw in a blowout win over the Cincinnati Bengals with Pittsburgh's regular backup quarterback Terry Hanratty injured. He made his first regular season start on Monday Night Football, during a week 12 game against the Miami Dolphins on December 3, 1973. The game was a disaster for Gilliam: he threw just seven passes, all incomplete and three intercepted by Dick Anderson, including one for a Miami touchdown.

Prior to the 1974 regular season, Steelers head coach Chuck Noll stated that the starting quarterback position was "wide open" among Terry Bradshaw, Gilliam, and Terry Hanratty. Gilliam outperformed the other two in the 1974 pre-season and Noll named Gilliam the starting quarterback, the first African American quarterback to start a season opener after the AFL–NFL merger in 1970. After a 30–0 shutout win over Baltimore in the season opener, he was featured on the cover of Sports Illustrated. Although he was 4–1–1 in the first six games, he was benched in late October for his lackluster performance and ignoring team rules and game plans. In particular, Gilliam ran afoul of Chuck Noll for his excessive number of pass plays. During the Week 2 game against the Denver Broncos, he threw a record 50 passes and almost totally ignored the run game, leading to a 35–35 tie. In Week 3, Gilliam delivered a terrible performance with only eight completed passes in 31 attempts and two interceptions, leading to the Steelers suffering the humiliation of a home shutout by archrival Oakland Raiders. After fans began demanding Terry Bradshaw's return, Gilliam was benched. He also received numerous death threats, some of them racially charged.

Bradshaw returned as the starter on Monday night in week 7 and led the team to a win in Super Bowl IX, the first of four Super Bowl championships with him at the helm of the offense. "He gave me my job back," Bradshaw told sportscaster James Brown on a February 2000 edition of Real Sports with Bryant Gumbel on HBO. He spent most of the 1975 season as the backup quarterback to Bradshaw but was demoted to third-string behind Hanratty after a poor performance at the end of the season against the Los Angeles Rams and missing some team meetings. The 1975 season was his last on an NFL roster, as the team repeated as NFL champions in Super Bowl X.

Gilliam felt that his demotion was based on racial reasons. In an interview with The Tennessean a year before his death, he said "I thought if you played well, you got to play. I guess I didn't understand the significance of being a black quarterback at the time." Wide receiver John Stallworth recalled that Gilliam's demotion was due to his poor on-field performance, disobeying Chuck Noll's game plan, and substance abuse issues and there was no racial motivation whatsoever on the team's part. He noted that Noll was "completely color-blind" as a coach and not racist in any way. Linebacker Andy Russell said that Gilliam was "immensely talented" as a quarterback, but unable to stay off of drugs.

The Steelers waived Gilliam prior to the 1976 preseason after he missed a team meeting. He battled heroin, cocaine, and alcohol addiction on and off over the next several years and even ended up living in a cardboard box under a bridge for two years.

He was arrested in New Orleans in 1976 for possession of a gun and cocaine. The New Orleans Saints then signed Gilliam, but he was cut in both 1976 and 1977, then played with the semipro Pittsburgh Wolf Pak, but quit in August 1978, after playing in just six games. He returned to semipro in 1979 with the Baltimore Eagles in the Atlantic Football Conference, but his season would take a couple of bizarre turns: first, an abortive attempt to jump to the Alabama Vulcans of the American Football Association ended when he borrowed the Vulcans' owner's Cadillac and failed to return it; then, after Gilliam went back to Baltimore, he was attacked by four men, who dragged him out of his parked car and repeatedly hit him on the head. Gilliam returned to football in 1981, playing quarterback for the semipro New Orleans Blue Knights of the Dixie Football League. He played with the Blue Knights for six seasons while working the docks of New Orleans, loading and unloading barges.

In 1983, Gilliam attempted a comeback to pro football in the new United States Football League, but was cut by the Denver Gold, then picked up by the Washington Federals. Gilliam played in four games, starting two of them, throwing five touchdowns and ten interceptions. Gilliam was cut early in training camp in January 1984, and retired from the sport for good. In 1986, Joe Gilliam was inducted into the American Football Association's Semi Pro Football Hall of Fame.

== Personal life and death ==
Gilliam ran a football camp for teens at Tennessee State in Nashville in mid-2000. He earned the nickname "Jefferson Street Joe" for the boulevard that runs by Tennessee State University in Nashville.

Gilliam died of a cocaine overdose on Christmas Day, 2000 shortly after watching an NFL game between the Dallas Cowboys and Tennessee Titans. He was four days away from his 50th birthday. Gilliam was sober for three years prior to his death and able to attend the final Steelers game at Three Rivers Stadium.

Gilliam's daughter is R&B singer Joi. His ex son-in-law is rapper Big Gipp of the Goodie Mob.
