= Gerry Mullins =

American football player (born 1949)

No. 72
- Position: Guard

Personal information
- Born: August 14, 1949 (age 77); Fullerton, California, U.S.
- Listed height: 6 ft 3 in (1.91 m)
- Listed weight: 244 lb (111 kg)

Career information
- High school: Anaheim (Anaheim, California)
- College: USC
- NFL draft: 1971: 4th round, 86th overall pick

Career history
- Pittsburgh Steelers (1971–1979)

Awards and highlights
- 4× Super Bowl champion (IX, X, XIII, XIV); Pittsburgh Steelers 50th Anniversary Team; Pittsburgh Steelers Hall of Honor

Career NFL statistics
- Games played: 124
- Games started: 87
- Fumble recoveries: 7
- Receptions: 2
- Receiving yards: 10
- Receiving touchdowns: 2
- Stats at Pro Football Reference

Gerry Blaine Mullins (born August 14, 1949) is an American former professional football player who was a guard for nine seasons for the Pittsburgh Steelers of the National Football League (NFL). He played college football for the USC Trojans.

Mullins was considered "undersized" in his day, but became known for his agility and versatility, and played as both guard and tackle.

== Early life and college ==
Gerry Blaine Mullins was raised in Anaheim, California where he began his football career at Fremont Junior High School, and was mentored at Anaheim High School by head football coach Clare Van Hoorebeke (1950–1972). Playing tight end, defensive end, and fullback, Mullins was a senior captain for the Colonists, who went 12-1 and finished as CIF-Southern Section 4-A Division finalists. At Anaheim, Mullins was a teammate and classmate of Jim Fassel, one of the team's quarterbacks. After graduating from AHS in 1967, Mullins played for head coach John McKay at the University of Southern California. After spending his first varsity season as a backup offensive tackle, Mullins shifted to tight end and earned the starting role that season, catching nine passes for 122 yards. His career best game came against Stanford, when he recorded five receptions for 84 yards, including a 19-yard TD pass from quarterback Jimmy Jones to help the Trojans beat the Indians 26–24. Mullins started in USC's 10–3 win over Michigan in the 1970 Rose Bowl as the Trojans finished a 10-0-1 season. As a senior in 1970, Mullins caught six passes for 89 yards as USC fell to a record of 6–4–1.

== Professional career ==
Selected in the fourth round (86th overall) of the 1971 NFL draft, Mullins mostly played right offensive guard for the Pittsburgh Steelers for his entire professional career (1971–1979), next to All-Pro centers Ray Mansfield (1971–1975) and Mike Webster (1976–1979). Known as "Moon," Mullins went on to start for all four world championship teams with the Steelers (Super Bowls IX, X, XIII, and XIV) during the 1970s. Mullins is remembered for a play in Super Bowl IX when he pulled on a sweep leaving an uncontested path for Franco Harris to trot in the end zone. Mullins also recovered an onside kick in Super Bowl X and recovered a fumble for a touchdown during the 1972 AFC Championship Game against the Miami Dolphins. Mullins' last game as a professional football player was Pittsburgh's victory in Super Bowl XIV. Prior to the 1980 season, he was waived during training camp and after declining offers to continue his career with the Cleveland Browns and Houston Oilers, Mullins retired. One of nine Steelers players to start in all four Super Bowl victories, Mullins was the first to leave the franchise.

Along with other players for the Steelers, Mullins also had a brief film career with a cameo appearance in The Rocky Bleier Story for MTM Enterprises.

== Life after football ==
Mullins lived in the Saxonburg area of Butler County, Pennsylvania. He became owner and president of Industrial Metals and Minerals in Bridgeville, Pennsylvania.
