= Jim Wolf (American football) =

American football player (1952–2003)

No. 62, 73
- Positions: Defensive tackle, defensive end

Personal information
- Born: March 4, 1952; Tyler, Texas, U.S.
- Died: December 17, 2003 (aged 51); Beaumont, Texas, U.S.
- Listed height: 6 ft 2 in (1.88 m)
- Listed weight: 240 lb (109 kg)

Career information
- High school: Warren (TX)
- College: Prairie View A&M
- NFL draft: 1974: 6th round, 149th overall pick

Career history
- Pittsburgh Steelers (1974); Kansas City Chiefs (1976)

Awards and highlights
- Super Bowl champion (IX)

Career NFL statistics
- Games played: 25
- Games started: 7
- Stats at Pro Football Reference

James Wolf (March 4, 1952 – December 17, 2003) was an American professional football defensive lineman in the National Football League (NFL). He played two seasons for the Pittsburgh Steelers and the Kansas City Chiefs. He was selected by the Pittsburgh Steelers in the sixth round of the 1974 NFL draft with the 149th overall pick. He died of multiple sclerosis.
