= Steve Davis (running back) =

American football player (born 1948)

No. 35
- Position: Running back

Personal information
- Born: November 10, 1948 (age 77); Lexington, Virginia, U.S.
- Listed height: 6 ft 1 in (1.85 m)
- Listed weight: 218 lb (99 kg)

Career information
- High school: Lylburn Downing (Lexington)
- College: Delaware State
- NFL draft: 1971: 3rd round, 60th overall pick

Career history
- Pittsburgh Steelers (1972–1974); New York Jets (1975–1976)

Awards and highlights
- Super Bowl champion (IX)

Career NFL statistics
- Rushing attempts: 322
- Rushing yards: 1,305
- Rushing touchdowns: 9
- Stats at Pro Football Reference

Steven Timothy Davis (born November 10, 1948) is an American former professional football player who was a running back for five seasons in the National Football League (NFL) for the Pittsburgh Steelers and the New York Jets. He won Super Bowl IX with the Steelers over the Minnesota Vikings.

== NFL career statistics ==
Legend
| | Won the Super Bowl |
| **Bold** | Career high |

=== Regular season ===
| Year | Team | Games | | Rushing | | | | | Receiving | | | | |
| Year | Team | GP | GS | Att | Yds | Avg | Lng | TD | Rec | Yds | Avg | Lng | TD |
|---|---|---|---|---|---|---|---|---|---|---|---|---|---|
| 1972 | PIT | 11 | 0 | 20 | 85 | 4.3 | **28** | 1 | 1 | 5 | 5.0 | 5 | 0 |
| 1973 | PIT | **14** | 0 | 67 | 266 | 4.0 | 27 | 2 | 7 | 31 | 4.4 | 9 | **1** |
| 1974 | PIT | **14** | 6 | 71 | 246 | 3.5 | 22 | 2 | **11** | **152** | **13.8** | **61** | **1** |
| 1975 | NYJ | **14** | 1 | 70 | 290 | 4.1 | 24 | 1 | 6 | 56 | 9.3 | 18 | 0 |
| 1976 | NYJ | 12 | **8** | **94** | **418** | **4.4** | 26 | **3** | 8 | 57 | 7.1 | 21 | 0 |
| | | 65 | 15 | 322 | 1,305 | 4.1 | 28 | 9 | 33 | 301 | 9.1 | 61 | 2 |

=== Playoffs ===
| Year | Team | Games | | Rushing | | | | | Receiving | | | | |
| Year | Team | GP | GS | Att | Yds | Avg | Lng | TD | Rec | Yds | Avg | Lng | TD |
|---|---|---|---|---|---|---|---|---|---|---|---|---|---|
| 1972 | PIT | 2 | 0 | 0 | 0 | 0.0 | 0 | 0 | 0 | 0 | 0.0 | 0 | 0 |
| 1973 | PIT | 1 | 0 | 0 | 0 | 0.0 | 0 | 0 | 0 | 0 | 0.0 | 0 | 0 |
| 1974 | PIT | **3** | 0 | **5** | **32** | **6.4** | **9** | 0 | 0 | 0 | 0.0 | 0 | 0 |
| | | 6 | 0 | 5 | 32 | 6.4 | 9 | 0 | 0 | 0 | 0.0 | 0 | 0 |
