= Dick Conn =

American football player (born 1951)

No. 22
- Position: Defensive back

Personal information
- Born: January 9, 1951 (age 75); Louisville, Kentucky, U.S.
- Listed height: 6 ft 0 in (1.83 m)
- Listed weight: 185 lb (84 kg)

Career information
- College: Georgia
- NFL draft: 1974: undrafted

Career history
- Pittsburgh Steelers (1974); New England Patriots (1975–1979)

Awards and highlights
- Super Bowl champion (IX)

Career NFL statistics
- Interceptions: 1
- Return yards: 160
- Stats at Pro Football Reference

Richard Conn (born January 9, 1951) is an American former professional football player who was a defensive back for six seasons with the Pittsburgh Steelers and New England Patriots of the National Football League (NFL). With the Steelers, he won Super Bowl IX. He played college football for the Georgia Bulldogs.
