= J. T. Thomas (defensive back) =

American football player (born 1951)

J.T. Thomas
No. 24, 26
- Position: Defensive back

Personal information
- Born: April 22, 1951 (age 75); Macon, Georgia, U.S.
- Listed height: 6 ft 2 in (1.88 m)
- Listed weight: 196 lb (89 kg)

Career information
- College: Florida State
- NFL draft: 1973: 1st round, 24th overall pick

Career history
- Pittsburgh Steelers (1973–1981); Denver Broncos (1982)

Awards and highlights
- 4× Super Bowl champion (IX, X, XIII, XIV); Pro Bowl (1976); Pittsburgh Steelers Hall of Honor; Second-team All-American (1972)

Career NFL statistics
- Interceptions: 20
- Interception yards: 147
- Touchdowns: 2
- Stats at Pro Football Reference

James "J. T." Thomas Jr. (born April 22, 1951) is an American former professional football player who was a defensive back in the National Football League (NFL). He was selected in the first round by the Pittsburgh Steelers with the 24th overall pick of the 1973 NFL draft. He was the first African-American football player to play football and graduate from Florida State University. Thomas played for the Steelers between 1973 and 1981, and was a member of the legendary dynasty Steel Curtain defense that won four Super Bowls in the 70s. Thomas played for the Denver Broncos in 1982.

== Biography ==
Thomas attended Lanier High School in Macon. After playing at Florida State, Thomas was the Steelers' first-round selection (24th overall) in the 1973 NFL draft. That year, Thomas played in all 14 regular-season games and in the Steelers' only playoff game. He recorded one interception that season.

In 1974 and 1975, the Steelers won back-to-back Super Bowls. In 1974, Thomas picked up a career-best five interceptions and he scored a touchdown on a fumble recovery. Thomas was named to the Pro Bowl after a 1976 season in which he collected two interceptions and a fumble recovery. In 1978, he sat out the season due to an inflammatory disease in the lungs and lymph nodes known as sarcoidosis.

During his time in Pittsburgh, Thomas played alongside cornerback Mel Blount. NFL.com named Thomas and Blount the sixth-best cornerback combination of all time.

During the 1982 preseason, Thomas was traded to the Denver Broncos for an initially undisclosed draft slot.

Thomas has lived in Monroeville, Pennsylvania, since the 1970s. Partnering with former Steeler Larry Brown in the late 1980s, they developed the Applebee's chain restaurants in western and central Pennsylvania and Morgantown, West Virginia markets. In 2009, he opened a Southern restaurant known as Red, Hot & Blue in Homestead, Pennsylvania.
