= Rick Druschel =

American football player (born 1952)

No. 73
- Position: Guard

Personal information
- Born: January 15, 1952 (age 74); Ellwood City, Pennsylvania, U.S.
- Listed height: 6 ft 2 in (1.88 m)
- Listed weight: 248 lb (112 kg)

Career information
- High school: Hempfield Area (PA)
- College: NC State
- NFL draft: 1974: 6th round, 150th overall pick

Career history
- Pittsburgh Steelers (1974)

Awards and highlights
- Super Bowl champion (IX); 2× First-team All-ACC (1972, 1973)

Career NFL statistics
- Games played: 11
- Stats at Pro Football Reference

Richard Dennis Druschel (born January 15, 1952) is an American former professional football player who played guard for one season for the Pittsburgh Steelers. In his one season in the NFL, he was part of the team that won Super Bowl IX.
