= Ray Mansfield =

American football player (1941–1996)

No. 77, 73, 56
- Positions: Center, Defensive tackle, Linebacker

Personal information
- Born: January 21, 1941; Bakersfield, California, U.S.
- Died: November 3, 1996 (aged 55); Grand Canyon, Arizona, U.S.
- Listed height: 6 ft 3 in (1.91 m)
- Listed weight: 250 lb (113 kg)

Career information
- High school: Kennewick (Kennewick, Washington)
- College: Washington
- NFL draft: 1963: 2nd round, 18th overall pick
- AFL draft: 1963: 5th round, 37th overall pick

Career history
- Philadelphia Eagles (1963); Pittsburgh Steelers (1964–1976)

Awards and highlights
- 2× Super Bowl champion (IX, X); 2× Second-team All-Pro (1972, 1975); Pittsburgh Steelers Hall of Honor; Second-team All-American (1962); First-team All-PCC (1962); Second-team All-PCC (1961)

Career NFL statistics
- Games played: 196
- Games started: 111
- Fumble recoveries: 9
- Stats at Pro Football Reference

Burt James Ray Mansfield (January 21, 1941 – November 3, 1996), nicknamed "Ranger", was an American professional football player who was a center in the National Football League (NFL) for the Philadelphia Eagles and Pittsburgh Steelers. He played college football for the Washington Huskies.

== Early life ==
Born in Bakersfield, California, Mansfield grew up in Kennewick, Washington, and graduated from Kennewick High School in 1959. He played college football at the University of Washington in Seattle under head coach Jim Owens. During his sophomore season in 1960, the Huskies won the Rose Bowl 17–7 over top-ranked Minnesota. After his senior season in 1962, he participated in the East-West Shrine Game. Mansfield is a member of the UW Athletic Hall of Fame.

== Playing career ==
Mansfield was the 18th overall selection in the 1963 NFL draft, taken by the Eagles in the second round, and played for them for one season. He was also selected in the AFL draft, in the fifth round by the Denver Broncos.

Mansfield moved to the Steelers in 1964 and played left defensive tackle for two years. He switched to offense and was their starting center for a decade, from 1966 until 1976, and was a key member of the Steelers' Super Bowl-winning teams of the 1974 and 1975 seasons. In his last season as a Steeler, he kicked the extra point on the Steelers' final touchdown in a playoff game at Baltimore, after Roy Gerela pulled a groin muscle. Mansfield was also a placekicker in college and for three college all-star teams.

Mansfield played in 182 consecutive games, and was succeeded at center by Mike Webster.

"Ray was a special person," former Steeler coach Chuck Noll said. "He was one of the guys who was a Steeler when I arrived in 1969, and he was great in the locker room. He was a guy that everybody rallied around. He always had a certain amount of levity, but he was a tremendous football player."

== After football ==
He retired from pro football in July 1977, and went on to a successful career as an insurance broker in the Pittsburgh area, previously his off-season job.

== Death ==
Known by his Steeler teammates as "Ranger" for his love of the outdoors, Mansfield died at age 55 from a heart attack while hiking with his son in the Grand Canyon in Arizona in November 1996. He was buried at Desert Lawn Memorial Park in his hometown of Kennewick.
