= Bernie Ulman =

American football and lacrosse official (1917–1986)

Bernard Ulman
- Born: December 16, 1917
- Died: January 30, 1986 (aged 68)
- Education: University of Maryland
- Occupations: Football and lacrosse official

Bernard Ulman (December 16, 1917 – January 30, 1986) was an American football and lacrosse official.

== Biography ==
Ulman played as a lacrosse midfielder at the University of Maryland from 1938 to 1943 and also played football for the school. Ulman officiated in the National Football League (NFL) for fifteen years and was selected to officiate in Super Bowl I and Super Bowl IX. Additionally, he was one of the most well-known officials in lacrosse; his career spanned twenty years. He was inducted into the National Lacrosse Hall of Fame as an official in 2003. In addition to officiating, he was a salesman of sports equipment.

Bernard Ulman died on January 30, 1986 after a long illness. He was 68.
