= Terry Brown (American football) =

American football player (born 1947)

No. 24
- Position: Safety

Personal information
- Born: January 9, 1947 (age 79); Walters, Oklahoma, U.S.
- Listed height: 6 ft 0 in (1.83 m)
- Listed weight: 205 lb (93 kg)

Career information
- High school: Marlow (Marlow, Oklahoma)
- College: Oklahoma State
- NFL draft: 1969: 3rd round, 73rd overall pick

Career history
- St. Louis Cardinals (1969–1971); Minnesota Vikings (1972–1975); Seattle Seahawks (1976)*; Cleveland Browns (1976)
- * Offseason or practice squad member only

Awards and highlights
- Second-team All-Big Eight (1968)

Career NFL statistics
- Interceptions: 7
- Fumble recoveries: 6
- Touchdowns: 2
- Stats at Pro Football Reference

Terry Lynn Brown (born January 9, 1947) is an American former professional football player who was a safety in the National Football League (NFL) from 1969 to 1976. His most famous play is when he scored a touchdown for the Minnesota Vikings in Super Bowl IX on a blocked punt making him the first Oklahoman to score a touchdown in the Super Bowl.

Brown played college football for the Oklahoma State Cowboys.
