= Franco Harris =

American football player (1950–2022)

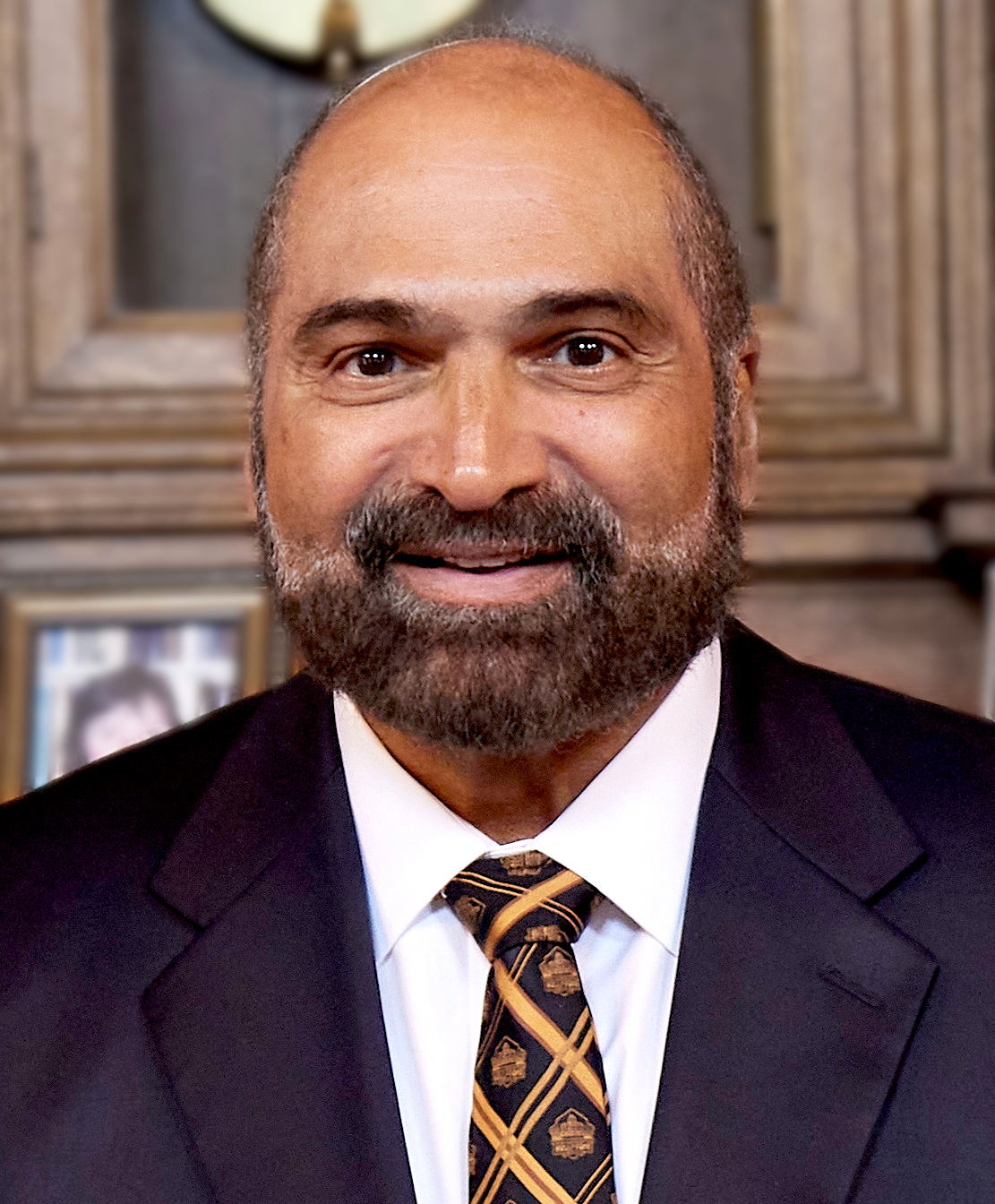
- Harris in 2022

No. 32, 34
- Position: Fullback

Personal information
- Born: March 7, 1950; Fort Dix, New Jersey, U.S.
- Died: December 20, 2022 (aged 72); Sewickley, Pennsylvania, U.S.
- Listed height: 6 ft 2 in (1.88 m)
- Listed weight: 230 lb (104 kg)

Career information
- High school: Rancocas Valley Regional (Mount Holly, New Jersey)
- College: Penn State (1968–1971)
- NFL draft: 1972: 1st round, 13th overall pick

Career history
- Pittsburgh Steelers (1972–1983); Seattle Seahawks (1984)

Awards and highlights
- 4× Super Bowl champion (IX, X, XIII, XIV); Super Bowl MVP (IX); NFL Offensive Rookie of the Year (1972); NFL Man of the Year (1976); First-team All-Pro (1977); 2× Second-team All-Pro (1972, 1975); 9× Pro Bowl (1972–1980); NFL rushing touchdowns leader (1976); NFL 1970s All-Decade Team; Pittsburgh Steelers All-Time Team; Pittsburgh Steelers Hall of Honor; Pittsburgh Steelers No. 32 retired; 2× Second-team All-East (1969, 1971)

Career NFL statistics
- Rushing yards: 12,120
- Rushing average: 4.1
- Rushing touchdowns: 91
- Receptions: 307
- Receiving yards: 2,287
- Receiving touchdowns: 9
- Stats at Pro Football Reference
- Pro Football Hall of Fame

Franco Harris (March 7, 1950 – December 20, 2022) was an American professional football player who was a fullback for 13 seasons in the National Football League (NFL), primarily with the Pittsburgh Steelers. He played college football for the Penn State Nittany Lions and was selected by the Steelers in the first round of the 1972 NFL draft. Harris spent his first 12 seasons with Pittsburgh, earning nine Pro Bowl selections, and was a member of the Seattle Seahawks in his last.

A four-time Super Bowl winner with the Steelers, Harris was the Most Valuable Player (MVP) of Super Bowl IX. He also scored the "Immaculate Reception" touchdown, one of professional football's most famous plays, which gave the Steelers their first-ever playoff win. Harris was inducted into the Pro Football Hall of Fame in 1990.

== Early life and education ==
Harris was born in Fort Dix, New Jersey. His father, Cad Harris, a Black soldier, served in World War II and was stationed in Italy during the war. His mother, Gina Parenti Harris, was a native Italian and became a "war bride", who moved with her husband when he returned to the United States after the end of the war.

Harris was a three-sport athlete (football, basketball, and baseball) at Rancocas Valley Regional High School in Mount Holly Township, New Jersey. He graduated in 1968. He then attended Penn State University, where he played on the Nittany Lions football team. Although he was primarily a blocker for the running back during his first year at Penn State, he amassed a career total of 2,002 yards rushing with 24 touchdowns and averaged over 5 yards per carry, while also catching 28 passes for 352 yards and another touchdown. He led the team in scoring in 1970.

Harris's statistics during his final three seasons at Penn State are as follows:

- 1969: 115 carries for 643 yards and 10 touchdowns; 12 catches for 189 yards.
- 1970: 142 carries for 675 yards and 8 touchdowns; 6 catches for 66 yards.
- 1971: 123 carries for 684 yards and 6 touchdowns; 10 catches for 97 yards and 1 touchdown.

== Professional career ==
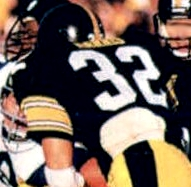
Harris rushing for the Steelers in Super Bowl XIV

Harris was selected 13th overall in the first round of the 1972 NFL draft by the Pittsburgh Steelers despite assistant personnel director Bill Nunn and head coach Chuck Noll preferring Robert Newhouse. In his first season with the Steelers (1972), Harris was named the NFL Rookie of the Year by The Sporting News and NFL Offensive Rookie of the Year by the Associated Press. In that season he gained 1,055 yards on 188 carries, with a 5.6 yards per carry average. He also rushed for 10 touchdowns and caught one touchdown pass. He was popular with Pittsburgh's large Italian-American population: his fans, including "Brigadier General" Frank Sinatra, dubbed themselves "Franco's Italian Army" and wore army helmets with his number on them.

During his rookie season, Harris was a key player in one of professional football's most famous plays, dubbed the "Immaculate Reception" by Pittsburgh sportscaster Myron Cope. In the first round of the playoffs, the Oakland Raiders were leading the Steelers 7–6 with 22 seconds to play when a Terry Bradshaw pass was deflected away from intended receiver John "Frenchy" Fuqua as defender Jack Tatum arrived to tackle him. Harris snatched the ball just before it hit the ground and ran it into the endzone, resulting in the Steelers' first playoff win.

Harris was chosen for nine consecutive Pro Bowls (1972–1980), and was All-Pro in 1977. Harris rushed for more than 1,000 yards in eight seasons, breaking a record set by Jim Brown. The running back tandem of Harris and Rocky Bleier combined with a strong defense to win four Super Bowls following the 1974, 1975, 1978, and 1979 seasons. On January 12, 1975, he was the Most Valuable Player of Super Bowl IX; in that game he rushed for 158 yards and a touchdown on 34 carries for a 16–6 win over the Minnesota Vikings. Harris was the first African American as well as the first Italian-American to be named Super Bowl MVP. Harris was a major contributor for the Steelers in all of their first four Super Bowl wins. His Super Bowl career totals of 101 carries for 354 yards are records and his four career rushing touchdowns are tied for the second-most in Super Bowl history.

Harris claimed that he extended his career and thus his contribution to the team's objectives (including four Super Bowl victories) by avoiding unnecessary contact.

With the retirement of O. J. Simpson after the 1979 season, Harris became the career rushing leader among active players. Following the 1983 season, Harris and Walter Payton were both closing in on Jim Brown's NFL rushing record, and Harris asked the Rooney family for a pay raise. Believing that Harris was on the downside of his career, they refused and Harris threatened to hold out. The Steelers released him during training camp in 1984 and he then signed with the Seattle Seahawks during the 1984 season. He played just eight games with the team, gaining only 170 yards before retiring (192 yards short of Jim Brown's record).

In his 13 professional seasons, Harris gained 12,120 yards (then 3rd all-time) on 2,949 carries, a 4.1 yards per carry average, and scored 91 rushing touchdowns (then also 3rd). He caught 307 passes for 2,287 yards, a 7.4 yards per reception average, and nine receiving touchdowns. Harris's 12,120 career rushing yards rank him amongst the all-time leaders in the NFL, while his 91 career rushing touchdowns rank him 10th all time tied with Jerome Bettis.

== NFL career statistics ==
Legend
	Won the Super Bowl
	Led the league
**Bold**	Career high

=== Regular season ===
Year	Team	Games		Rushing					Receiving				
Year	Team	GP	GS	Att	Yds	Avg	Lng	TD	Rec	Yds	Avg	Lng	TD
1972	PIT	14	10	188	1,055	**5.6**	**75**	10	21	180	8.6	29	1
1973	PIT	12	8	188	698	3.7	35	3	10	69	6.9	19	0
1974	PIT	12	11	208	1,006	4.8	54	5	23	200	**8.7**	31	1
1975	PIT	14	14	262	**1,246**	4.8	36	10	28	214	7.6	**44**	1
1976	PIT	14	14	289	1,128	3.9	30	**14**	23	151	6.6	39	0
1977	PIT	14	14	300	1,162	3.9	61	11	11	62	5.6	15	0
1978	PIT	16	16	**310**	1,082	3.5	37	8	22	144	6.5	15	0
1979	PIT	15	15	267	1,186	4.4	71	11	36	**291**	8.1	21	1
1980	PIT	13	13	208	789	3.8	26	4	30	196	6.5	31	**2**
1981	PIT	16	16	242	987	4.1	50	8	**37**	250	6.8	26	1
1982	PIT	9	9	140	604	4.3	21	2	31	249	8.0	20	0
1983	PIT	16	16	279	1,007	3.6	19	5	34	278	8.2	29	**2**
1984	SEA	8	6	68	170	2.5	16	0	1	3	3.0	3	0
Career		173	162	2,949	12,120	4.1	75	91	307	2,287	7.4	44	9

=== Playoffs ===
Year	Team	Games		Rushing					Receiving				
Year	Team	GP	GS	Att	Yds	Avg	Lng	TD	Rec	Yds	Avg	Lng	TD
1972	PIT	2	2	34	140	4.1	14	0	7	99	14.1	**60**	**1**
1973	PIT	1	1	10	29	2.9	8	0	0	0	0.0	0	0
1974	PIT	3	3	**87**	**343**	3.9	25	**6**	1	5	5.0	5	0
1975	PIT	3	3	81	314	3.9	25	2	6	84	14.0	26	0
1976	PIT	1	1	18	132	**7.3**	**50**	0	3	24	8.0	15	0
1977	PIT	1	1	28	92	3.3	20	1	4	20	5.0	12	0
1978	PIT	3	3	64	224	3.5	22	4	1	22	**22.0**	22	0
1979	PIT	3	3	62	214	3.5	13	3	**14**	**148**	10.6	32	0
1982	PIT	1	1	10	35	3.5	7	0	11	71	6.5	17	0
1983	PIT	1	1	6	33	5.5	14	0	4	31	7.8	11	0
Career		19	19	400	1,556	3.9	50	16	51	504	9.9	60	1

== Post-football ==
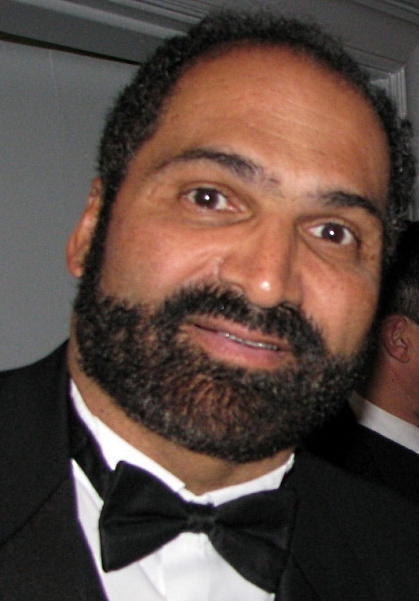
Harris in 2009

In 1990, Harris and his former Penn State teammate Lydell Mitchell founded Super Bakery (renamed RSuper Foods in 2006), which produces nutrition-oriented food for schoolchildren. Harris and Mitchell also partnered in 1996 to rescue the Parks Sausage Company in Baltimore, the first African-American–owned business to go public in the U.S.

In 2007, Harris was chosen by Forest City Enterprises to lead a charitable foundation they created, related to the development of a casino for downtown Pittsburgh that would be managed by Harrah's.

In August 2008, Harris attended the 2008 Democratic National Convention, in Denver, Colorado, as part of the Pennsylvania delegation. Harris voted for Barack Obama on December 15, 2008, as one of Pennsylvania's 21 Democratic presidential electors.

In January 2011, Harris became co-owner of the Pittsburgh Passion. Also in 2011, Harris briefly worked with The Meadows Racetrack and Casino, before the casino suspended the relationship after his comments in support of Joe Paterno, his coach while at Penn State, during the Penn State child sex abuse scandal.

In 2019, Harris starred in the NFL's 100th Anniversary commercial recreating the Immaculate Reception with Terry Bradshaw.

== Personal life ==
Harris was married to Dana Dokmanovich. They had one son together: Franco "Dok" Harris, who ran as a third-party candidate in the 2009 Pittsburgh mayoral election and finished in second place with 25% of the vote. Franco's brother, Pete Harris, played football for Penn State and died of a heart attack on August 15, 2006, at age 49.

Harris served as part of the advisory board of Penn State's Center for Food Innovation, and in the fall of 2009 was named a Conti Professor by Penn State's School of Hospitality Management. He was involved in, and provided funding to, Penn Staters for Responsible Stewardship, a group aimed at ousting the members of Penn State's board of trustees.

== Death and tributes ==
"We are truly heartbroken. The reality of losing such a magnificent individual has not yet settled in. We have shared Franco with so many people throughout our lives and in so many ways. Beyond his incredible career in the NFL Franco represents what is best in humanity: kindness, charity, decency, and humility. He led by example on and off the field with the goal of making this a better world for us all. We know he has touched so many of you and we mourn with you. We will remain steadfast in living and achieving the world that he wanted to build."

— Statement from Franco Harris's family following his death

Harris died in his sleep at his home in Sewickley, Pennsylvania, on December 20, 2022, at age 72, three days before the 50th anniversary of the "Immaculate Reception". Harris's death was considered sudden, as he had been active on social media just days before his death and had spoken to visitors at the Heinz History Center the day before his death including a live interview with KDKA-TV from the Heinz History Center. He was set to attend a ceremony at halftime during a Steelers game against the Las Vegas Raiders on December 24, 2022, to retire his jersey number. Hours before his death, Harris recorded an interview with Steelers defensive end Cameron Heyward for his podcast in what would be his last public interview, during which he ironically commented about how he was "feeling good" and happy to have made it to the 50th anniversary of the "Immaculate Reception". His cause of death was later ruled as natural causes.

Immediately after his death, many gave public tributes. Terry Bradshaw, who had found out about Harris's death from his wife after seeing a text message from Mel Blount, had just seen Harris two weeks prior, filming material related to the Immaculate Reception's anniversary and was in a "state of shock". Bradshaw praised Harris, saying that "as a teammate, he was just the best." Steelers president Art Rooney II, who like the rest of the Rooney family was close to Harris, said through a statement by the team that "From his rookie season, which included the Immaculate Reception, through the next 50 years, Franco brought joy to people on and off the field. He never stopped giving back in so many ways. He touched so many, and he was loved by so many." In addition to Penn State itself, two Penn State alumni with connections to the Steelers—Harris's former teammate Jack Ham and current Steelers tight end Pat Freiermuth—also paid their respects to Harris. Other tributes would later come out by current and former Steelers as well as other Pittsburgh celebrities such as Joe Greene, Jerome Bettis, Najee Harris, Ben Roethlisberger, Hines Ward, Tony Dungy, T. J. Watt, Trai Essex, Arthur Moats, James Conner, former Steelers head coach Mike Tomlin, Charlie Batch, Kurt Angle, Mark Madden, Tony Dorsett, Darrelle Revis, Billy Gardell, and Joe Manganiello; the Penguins and Pirates also paid tribute. The December 27, 2022, episode of Pittsburgh Dad covering the aforementioned Steelers-Raiders game (a 13-10 Steelers win) featured a tribute to Harris from the titular character. Shortly after Harris's death, there was a street named after him in Mount Holly, New Jersey where he went to high school (Rancocas Valley Regional High School). The former Ridgeway Street is now known as Franco Harris Way.

Despite only playing briefly with the Seahawks, the team also acknowledged Harris's passing; other tributes from the NFL came from the Raiders, Baltimore Ravens, Emmitt Smith, Michael Irvin, Shannon Sharpe, Eric Dickerson, O. J. Simpson, Barry Sanders, Larry Csonka, Jack Youngblood, and NFL commissioner Roger Goodell. Longtime ESPN personality Chris Berman paid tribute to Harris. Presidents Joe Biden and Barack Obama also paid tribute to Harris. U.S. Senator-elect John Fetterman released a statement mourning Harris, who supported his 2022 candidacy.

The Steelers held a public viewing for Harris at Acrisure Stadium on December 27, 2022, prior to the family holding a private funeral service.

== Honors ==
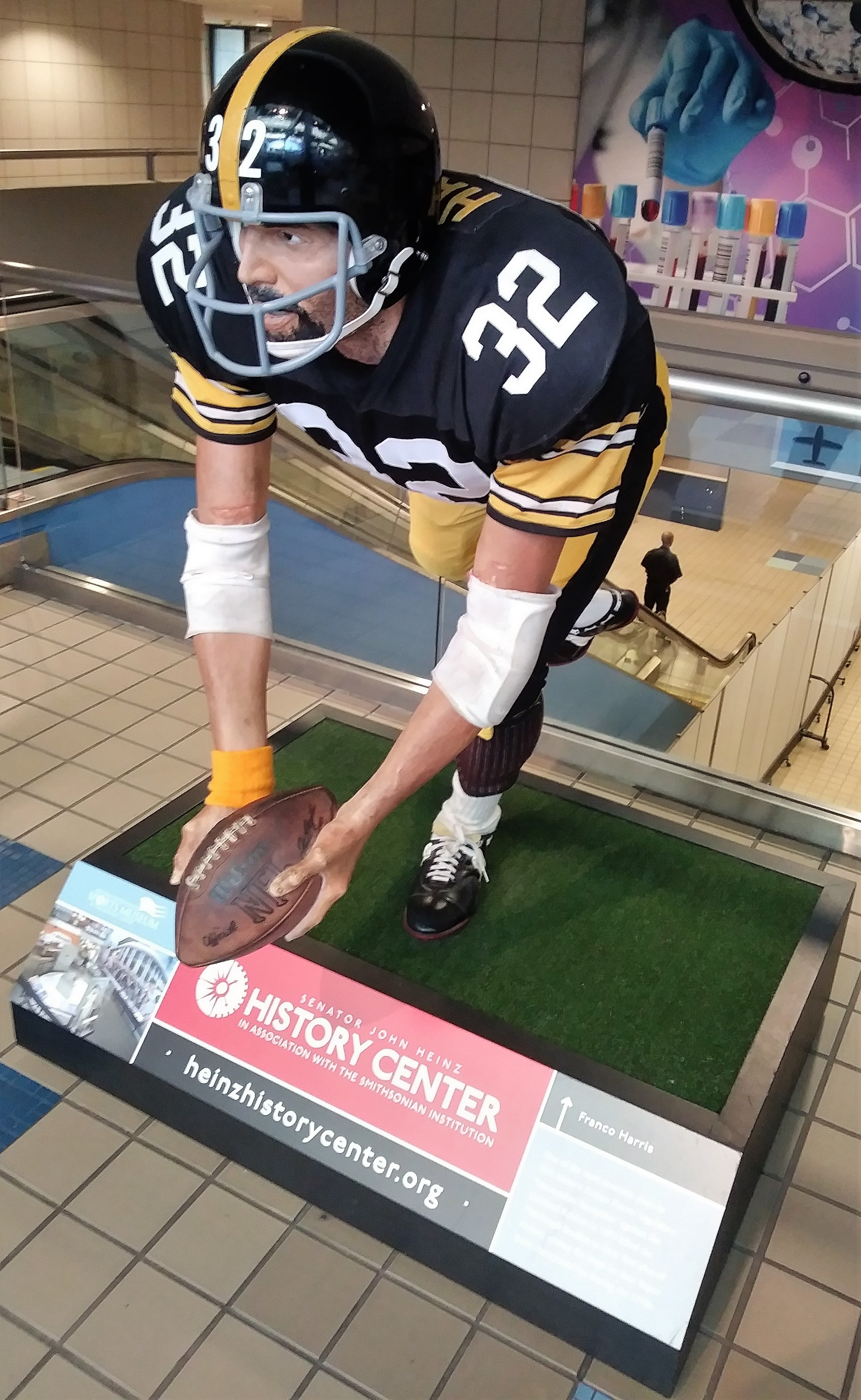
Statue of Harris making the "Immaculate Reception" at Pittsburgh International Airport.

In 1984, Harris received the Golden Plate Award of the American Academy of Achievement. In 1996, he served as an honorary co-captain for the Steelers at Super Bowl XXX and, on behalf of the then-current captains of the Steelers and the Dallas Cowboys called the ceremonial coin toss which was performed by Joe Montana. Harris would serve as an honorary co-captain again at Super Bowl XL a decade later. In 1999, he was ranked number 83 on The Sporting News list of the 100 Greatest Football Players. In 2006, The Heinz History Center, home of the Western Pennsylvania Sports Museum, installed a life-size figure of Harris in the grand concourse of Pittsburgh International Airport, which recreates the "Immaculate Reception". He was inducted into the New Jersey Hall of Fame in 2011. On December 24, 2022, the 50th anniversary of the "Immaculate Reception", Harris became the third Steeler to have his number (32) retired; the first two were Ernie Stautner (70) and Joe Greene (75).

== In popular culture ==
In John Grisham's 2008 novel Playing For Pizza, the fullback of the Parma Panthers is nicknamed Franco as a tribute to his hero, Franco Harris, to whom he refers as the "greatest Italian football player". A fictional version of Harris is depicted in the season 3 premiere episode of This Is Us.

== See also ==
- Glossary of American football
