= Marv Kellum =

American football player (1952–2023)

No. 54, 59
- Position: Linebacker

Personal information
- Born: June 23, 1952; Topeka, Kansas, U.S.
- Died: February 4, 2023 (aged 70); Pittsburgh, Pennsylvania, U.S.
- Listed height: 6 ft 2 in (1.88 m)
- Listed weight: 225 lb (102 kg)

Career information
- High school: Perry-Lecompton (Perry, KS)
- College: Wichita State
- NFL draft: 1974: undrafted

Career history
- Pittsburgh Steelers (1974–1976); St. Louis Cardinals (1977)

Awards and highlights
- 2× Super Bowl champion (IX, X)

Career NFL statistics
- Sacks: 2.0
- Interceptions: 2
- Fumble recoveries: 1
- Stats at Pro Football Reference

Marvin Lee Kellum (June 23, 1952 – February 4, 2023) was an American professional football player who played linebacker for four seasons for the Pittsburgh Steelers. He was a member of the Steelers first 2 World Championships, Super Bowls IX & X, and St. Louis Cardinals. Kellum recovered a fumble on the opening kick-off of the second half of Super Bowl IX, which led to the game's first touchdown. He was used mainly on special teams with the Steelers.

During Kellum's freshman year at Wichita State University, a plane crash near the Continental Divide in Colorado killed 14 Shocker players, head coach Ben Wilson and 14 others. Kellum and his freshman squad teammates were promoted to the varsity alongside players who were not involved in the crash, and WSU resumed its season three weeks after the catastrophe, thanks to an NCAA waiver allowing the Shockers to use freshmen on their varsity team (the NCAA prohibited freshmen from playing varsity football and basketball at the time; those restrictions were repealed in January 1972).
