= Glen Edwards (safety) =

American football player (born 1947)

No. 27
- Position: Safety

Personal information
- Born: July 31, 1947 (age 79); St. Petersburg, Florida, U.S.
- Listed height: 6 ft 0 in (1.83 m)
- Listed weight: 185 lb (84 kg)

Career information
- High school: Gibbs (St. Petersburg)
- College: Florida A&M
- NFL draft: 1971: undrafted

Career history
- Pittsburgh Steelers (1971–1977); San Diego Chargers (1978–1981); Tampa Bay Bandits (1983)

Awards and highlights
- 2× Super Bowl champion (IX, X); First-team All-Pro (1976); 3× Second-team All-Pro (1973, 1975, 1976); 2× Pro Bowl (1975, 1976)

Career NFL statistics
- Interceptions: 39
- Games: 142
- Stats at Pro Football Reference

Glen Edwards (born July 31, 1947) is an American former professional football player who was a safety in the National Football League (NFL) for the Pittsburgh Steelers from 1971 to 1977, and for the San Diego Chargers from 1978 to 1981. Edwards became a full-time starter with the Steelers as a free safety in 1973, and in 1974 won the award as the team's most valuable player. Edwards won two Super Bowls (IX and X) and was named to two Pro Bowl (1975, 1976) while with the Steelers.

== Early life ==
Edwards was a standout player at Gibbs High in St. Petersburg, Florida before attending Florida A&M University.

== Professional career ==
Edwards made two key plays in his Super Bowl appearances. In Super Bowl IX, he laid a hit on Minnesota Vikings receiver John Gilliam just as Gilliam caught a pass near the goal line. The ball popped out of Gilliam's hands and into the arms of Steelers cornerback Mel Blount for an interception. In Super Bowl X, he sealed a victory for Pittsburgh by intercepting a pass from Dallas Cowboys quarterback Roger Staubach in the end zone as time expired in the game.

Edwards was a member of Pittsburgh's famed Steel Curtain defense, and he also returned punts and kickoffs for the Steelers. He was traded to the Chargers for a 1979 6th round pick in August 1978. With the Chargers he recorded an interception in their famous 1982 AFC playoff victory known as The Epic in Miami. He finished his playing career with the Tampa Bay Bandits in the United States Football League in 1983.

As a professional with the Steelers, Edwards was well known for his dirty play and consistent attempts to injure opposing players. For example in 1974 Edwards hit Cincinnati Bengals quarterback Ken Anderson late out of bounds with an unnecessary and brutal blow to the head. Edwards was immediately penalized for unsportsmanlike conduct and ejected from the game.

Edwards finished his 11 NFL seasons with 39 interceptions, which he returned for 961 yards and 3 touchdowns. He also recovered 13 fumbles, returned 104 punts for 959 yards, and gained 257 yards on 13 kickoff returns.

== Personal life ==
After his football career, Edwards dealt with tax problems and held numerous jobs. He retired around age 60 after working in construction.

Edwards battled a cocaine addiction until c. 2000. During that time, he lost both of his Super Bowl rings. He gave his Super Bowl X ring to a drug dealer as collateral for a $20 loan, which he failed to repay. Edwards' ring from Super Bowl IX went missing after he entrusted it to a friend while recovering from his drug addiction.
