= Dwight White =

American football player (1949–2008)

No. 78
- Position: Defensive end

Personal information
- Born: July 30, 1949; Hampton, Virginia, U.S.
- Died: June 6, 2008 (aged 58); Pittsburgh, Pennsylvania, U.S.
- Listed height: 6 ft 4 in (1.93 m)
- Listed weight: 255 lb (116 kg)

Career information
- High school: James Madison (Dallas, Texas)
- College: East Texas State
- NFL draft: 1971: 4th round, 104th overall pick

Career history
- Pittsburgh Steelers (1971–1980)

Awards and highlights
- 4× Super Bowl champion (IX, X, XIII, XIV); Second-team All-Pro (1975); 2× Pro Bowl (1972, 1973); Pittsburgh Steelers All-Time Team; Pittsburgh Steelers Hall of Honor

Career NFL statistics
- Interceptions: 4
- Games: 126
- Stats at Pro Football Reference

Dwight Lynn White (July 30, 1949 – June 6, 2008) was an American professional football player who was a defensive end for 10 seasons with the Pittsburgh Steelers of the National Football League (NFL). He played college football for the East Texas State Lions (now East Texas A&M). He won four Super Bowls with the Steelers as a member of their famed Steel Curtain defense.

== Life and career ==
Born in Hampton, Virginia, White graduated from James Madison High School in Dallas, Texas and played college football at East Texas State University (now East Texas A&M University) where he was teammates with future Super Bowl MVP Harvey Martin.

=== Pittsburgh Steelers ===
Nicknamed "Mad Dog", because of his intensity, White became a two-time Pro Bowl defensive end. White spent much of the week leading up to Super Bowl IX in a hospital, suffering from pneumonia; he lost 20 pounds and was not expected to play in the game. However, he did play, and accounted for the only scoring in the first half when he sacked Fran Tarkenton in the end zone for a safety — the first points in Steelers' history in a championship game, and also the first safety in Super Bowl history. The Steelers defeated the Minnesota Vikings 16–6.

White finished his career with 46 quarterback sacks as recorded unofficially by the Steelers; sacks were not an official NFL defensive stat until 1982.

Steelers owner Dan Rooney called White "one of the greatest players to ever wear a Steelers uniform" and he was named to the Steelers All-Time team in 1982 and again in 2007. He retired after the 1980 season and went on to become a stock broker.

== Death ==
Dwight White died of complications that arose from an earlier surgery. A blood clot in his lung, the complication from back surgery, is the suspected cause of death. On February 1, 2010, his family filed a wrongful death suit against the University of Pittsburgh Medical Center and three doctors, claiming that his death had been caused by medical negligence.
