= Gordon Gravelle =

American football player (born 1949)

No. 71, 73
- Position: Tackle

Personal information
- Born: June 12, 1949 (age 77); Oakland, California, U.S.
- Listed height: 6 ft 5 in (1.96 m)
- Listed weight: 250 lb (113 kg)

Career information
- High school: Ygnacio Valley (Concord, California)
- College: Brigham Young
- NFL draft: 1972: 2nd round, 38th overall pick

Career history
- Pittsburgh Steelers (1972–1976); New York Giants (1977–1979); Los Angeles Rams (1979)

Awards and highlights
- 2× Super Bowl champion (IX, X); Second-team All-American (1971); WAC Lineman of the Year (1971)

Career NFL statistics
- Games played: 96
- Games started: 68
- Stats at Pro Football Reference

Gordon Carr Gravelle (born June 12, 1949) is an American former professional football player who was an offensive tackle in the National Football League (NFL). He played college football for the BYU Cougars and was selected in the second round of the 1972 NFL draft. Gravelle spent eight seasons with three teams: the Pittsburgh Steelers (1972–1976), New York Giants (1977–1979), and Los Angeles Rams (1979). He earned two Super Bowl rings in Super Bowl IX and Super Bowl X with the Steelers. He lost Super Bowl XIV in 1979 with the Los Angeles Rams.

Gravelle was traded from the Steelers to the Giants for a second-round pick in the 1980 NFL draft (Bob Kohrs) on August 30, 1977. The Giants were in need of offensive tackles of which the Steelers had a surplus. He announced his retirement in June 1979 but added his desire to be traded to a West Coast team to be near the private airport that he owned in Antioch, California. He rejoined the Giants on September 6 after teammate and fellow ex-Steeler Jim Clack convinced him to end his retirement. He was also fined $15,300 which was $300 for each day missed from June minicamp through training camp and including Week 1 of the 1979 season.

His first game after returning to the ballclub was a 27–0 shutout loss to the Washington Redskins at RFK Stadium on September 17. During the Monday Night Football telecast, he was subjected to criticism from the broadcast team of Howard Cosell, Frank Gifford and Fran Tarkenton for failure to prevent Coy Bacon from sacking Joe Pisarcik throughout the contest. The problem was the broadcasters had misidentified Gus Coppens as Gravelle based on a Giants roster provided to the media that mistakenly switched the uniform numbers of both players. Gravelle called Cosell "a pompous, senile idiot. He's a disgrace to the broadcast profession, the epitome of an arrogant egotist" and threatened to sue him for slander over his on-air comment that "he (Gravelle) may take another fine and go home again."

Gravelle was subsequently waived by the Giants and signed with the Rams on October 23.
