= Larry Brown (tight end, born 1949) =

American football player (born 1949)

No. 79, 87
- Positions: Tight end, tackle

Personal information
- Born: June 16, 1949 (age 77); Jacksonville, Florida, U.S.
- Listed height: 6 ft 4 in (1.93 m)
- Listed weight: 246 lb (112 kg)

Career information
- High school: Bradford (Starke, Florida)
- College: Kansas
- NFL draft: 1971: 5th round, 106th overall pick

Career history
- Pittsburgh Steelers (1971–1984)

Awards and highlights
- 4× Super Bowl champion (IX, X, XIII, XIV); Pro Bowl (1982); Pittsburgh Steelers All-Time Team; Pittsburgh Steelers Hall of Honor

Career NFL statistics
- Games played: 167
- Receptions: 48
- Receiving yards: 636
- Receiving touchdowns: 5
- Stats at Pro Football Reference

Lawrence Brown (born June 16, 1949) is an American former professional football player who was a tight end and offensive tackle with the Pittsburgh Steelers of the National Football League (NFL). He played college football for the Kansas Jayhawks, and played on the 1968 Orange Bowl squad with future Pro Football Hall of Fame running back John Riggins and pro quarterback Bobby Douglass.

Brown played as a tight end from 1971 to 1976, and as a tackle from 1977 to 1984. During that time, he was one of 22 players to play in all of the first four of the Steelers Super Bowl victories (Super Bowl IX, Super Bowl X, Super Bowl XIII, and Super Bowl XIV). Brown scored a touchdown late in the fourth quarter of Super Bowl IX against the Minnesota Vikings.
