= Andy Russell (American football) =

American football player (1941–2024)

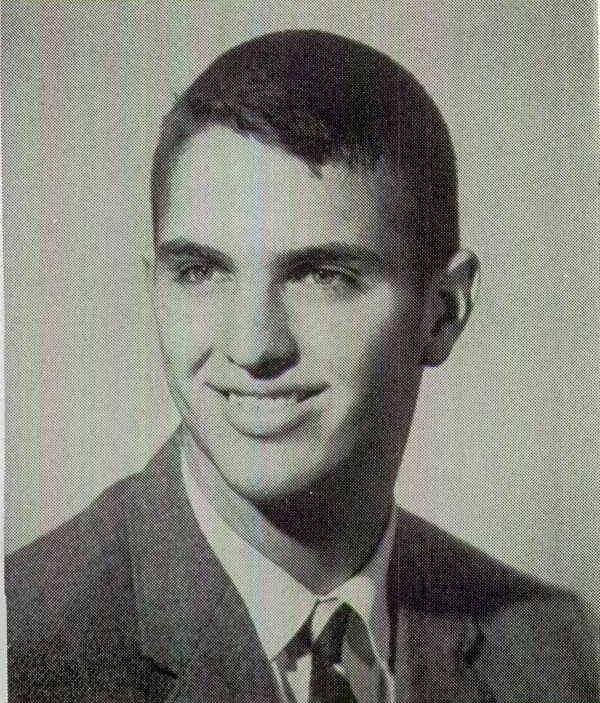

No. 36, 34
- Position: Linebacker

Personal information
- Born: October 29, 1941; Detroit, Michigan, U.S.
- Died: March 1, 2024 (aged 82)
- Listed height: 6 ft 2 in (1.88 m)
- Listed weight: 225 lb (102 kg)

Career information
- High school: Ladue Horton Watkins (Ladue, Missouri)
- College: Missouri
- NFL draft: 1963: 16th round, 220th overall pick

Career history
- Pittsburgh Steelers (1963, 1966–1976)

Awards and highlights
- 2× Super Bowl champion (IX, X); First-team All-Pro (1975); 4× Second-team All-Pro (1967, 1968, 1970, 1972); 7× Pro Bowl (1968, 1970–1975); Pittsburgh Steelers All-Time Team; Pittsburgh Steelers Hall of Honor

Career NFL statistics
- Interceptions: 18
- Interception yards: 238
- Touchdowns: 1
- Stats at Pro Football Reference

Charles Andrew Russell (October 29, 1941 – March 1, 2024) was an American professional football player who spent his entire 12-year career as a linebacker for the Pittsburgh Steelers of the National Football League (NFL).

== Early life ==
Russell was born October 29, 1941, in Detroit, Michigan to a family that relocated multiple times in his childhood (to Chicago and New York) due to his father's work as an executive with the Monsanto chemical company. The family eventually settled in Ladue, a suburb of St. Louis, when Russell was a 7th grader. He grew up wanting to be a businessman.

He attended Ladue High School where he played high school football and basketball. He was nicknamed "the Horse" for his power, and was known for his use of the stiff-arm as a runner. In a 1958 football game played on Halloween, Russell scored five touchdowns as a fullback. He scored 121 points total in 1958, and that team was undefeated and won its league's title. He was also on the track team, and had once set a low hurdles record. Russell graduated in 1959.

In football, as a senior Russell was named an All-American by The Sporting News and was first team all-state. He received the most votes of the all-district team selected by the St. Louis Globe-Democrat.

== College ==
Heavily recruited by out-state universities, he selected the University of Missouri which gave him an athletic scholarship. Under Coach Dan Devine he played both linebacker and fullback. In his three seasons (1960–1962) with the team, they lost just four times (with one loss later vacated) while Russell led the team in rushing (1961) and interceptions (1962). In addition to his football talents, he graduated with a bachelor's degree in economics in 1963. He played in the Blue Bonnet Bowl for Missouri. He never missed a game in high school or college.

== Playing career ==
His father did not wish for him to play professional football, and Russell put a "no" on every questionnaire mailed to him by prospective NFL teams. However, the one team that did not send him a letter was the one who drafted him in the Pittsburgh Steelers. However, he elected to sign for a $12,000 salary and a $3,000 signing bonus. After playing for the Steelers his rookie season in 1963, Russell temporarily left the team for the Army to fulfill ROTC commitments that had him stationed in Germany. He then returned to the Steelers in 1966, having convinced his father that it would be best for him to play football to pay for further studies in economics for a master's degree. Russell would play the next eleven seasons and graduate with an M.B.A. from Missouri in economics/finance in 1967 (the following year, he formed his own company involving investment vehicle syndicates).

Russell was one of the few players future Pro Football Hall of Fame and member of the NFL 100th Anniversary Team coach Chuck Noll kept, when he became the Steelers head coach in 1969. Russell was an early member of Pittsburgh's famed Steel Curtain defense and was named the Steelers' MVP in 1971. He made seven Pro Bowl appearances—in 1969 and from 1971 through 1976—and earned two Super Bowl rings in Super Bowl IX and Super Bowl X. When future Pro Football Hall of Fame linebacker Jack Ham joined the team as a rookie in 1971, Russell took the time to mentor Ham, contrary to the usual customs of veteran-rookie interactions at the time.

On December 27, 1975, Russell set the NFL playoff record for a returned touchdown–93 yards in a Three Rivers Stadium victory over the Baltimore Colts. Some have claimed it as the longest football play from scrimmage in time duration. The record was broken with a 98 yard return in 2023.

He never missed a game, playing in 168 consecutive games for the Steelers. His teammates voted him team captain for ten seasons. He was named a member of the Steelers All-Time Team and the NFL’s All-Decade Team for the 1970s. In 2017, he was an inaugural member into the Steelers Hall of Honor. Russell was one of only four inductees, out of a class of twenty-seven, who were not in the Pro Football Hall of Fame.

In 1976, he was inducted into the Missouri Sports Hall of Fame and to the Mizzou Athletics Hall of Fame in 1993. In 2011, the Professional Football Researchers Association named Russell to the PFRA Hall of Very Good Class of 2011.

== Personal life ==
After his playing days ended, Russell maintained his interest in business and investing to go along with endurance canoeing, mountain climbing, and philanthropy. Russell's financial success came outside football, and he was an active entrepreneur involved in the investment business during and after his football career. He was a partner with various investment banking firms.

Among his charitable and community service efforts, he founded the Andy Russell Charitable Foundation in 1999, and generated over $10 million in contributions to Children's Hospital in Pittsburgh through the Andy Russell Charitable Golf Tournament. The foundation also supported charities and charitable causes such as The Ronald McDonald House, Leukemia Society, The Cancer Society, Economics PA, Cystic Fibrosis, Mothers Hope, Juvenile Diabetes, SIDS, and Pittsburgh Vision Services. Russell's most recent charitable work before his death was Everyone's Playground, a park for special needs children located in Selinsgrove, Pennsylvania.

In 1989, he was named Big Brothers and Sisters Man of the Year.

Russell wrote three books, A Steeler Odyssey (1998), An Odd Steelers Journey (2002), and Beyond the Goalpost (2010).

== Death ==
Russell died on March 1, 2024, at the age of 82. He died of complications from Alzheimer’s Disease and respiratory syncytial virus (RSV). A memorial service for Russell was held on June 15, 2024, at Everyone's Playground.
