= Super Bowl IX =

1975 Edition of the Super Bowl

Pittsburgh Steelers (AFC) (10–3–1)	Minnesota Vikings (NFC) (10–4)
16	6
Head coach: Chuck Noll	Head coach: Bud Grant
	1	2	3	4	Total
PIT	0	2	7	7	16
MIN	0	0	0	6	6
- Date: January 12, 1975
- Kickoff time: 2:00 p.m. CST (UTC-6)
- Stadium: Tulane Stadium; New Orleans, Louisiana
- MVP: Franco Harris, fullback
- Favorite: Steelers by 3
- Referee: Bernie Ulman
- Attendance: 80,997

Ceremonies
- National anthem: New Orleans Chapter of the Society for the Preservation of Barbershop Quartet Singing in America--Chorus
- Coin toss: Bernie Ulman
- Halftime show: "Tribute to Duke Ellington" with Mercer Ellington and Grambling State University Band

TV in the United States
- Network: NBC
- Announcers: Curt Gowdy, Al DeRogatis, Don Meredith and Charlie Jones
- Nielsen ratings: 42.4 (est. 56 million viewers)
- Market share: 72
- Cost of 30-second commercial: $107,000

Radio in the United States
- Network: NBC Radio
- Announcers: Jim Simpson and John Brodie

Super Bowl IX was an American football game played between the American Football Conference (AFC) champion Pittsburgh Steelers and the National Football Conference (NFC) champion Minnesota Vikings to decide the National Football League (NFL) champion for the 1974 season. The game was played on January 12, 1975, at Tulane Stadium in New Orleans, Louisiana. The Steelers defeated the Vikings by the score of 16–6 to win their first Super Bowl, becoming the last of the NFL’s "Original Eight" teams to win a league championship.

This game matched two of the NFL's best defenses and two future Pro Football Hall of Fame quarterbacks. Led by quarterback Terry Bradshaw and the Steel Curtain defense, the Steelers advanced to their first Super Bowl after posting a 10–3–1 regular-season record and playoff victories over the Buffalo Bills and the Oakland Raiders. The Vikings were led by quarterback Fran Tarkenton and the Purple People Eaters defense; they advanced to their second consecutive Super Bowl and third overall after finishing the regular season with a 10–4 record and defeating the St. Louis Cardinals and the Los Angeles Rams in the playoffs.

The first half of Super Bowl IX was a defensive struggle, with the lone score being the first safety in Super Bowl history when Tarkenton was downed in his own end zone. The Steelers then recovered a fumble on the second-half kickoff and scored on fullback Franco Harris's 9-yard run. The Vikings cut the score, 9–6, early in the fourth quarter by recovering a blocked punt in Pittsburgh's end zone for a touchdown, but the Steelers then drove 66 yards on their ensuing possession to score on Larry Brown's 4-yard touchdown reception to put the game out of reach.

In total, the Steelers limited the Vikings to Super Bowl record lows of nine first downs, 119 total offensive yards, 17 rushing yards, and no offensive scores (Minnesota's only score came on a blocked punt, and they did not even score on the extra point attempt). The Steelers accomplished this despite losing starting linebackers Andy Russell and Jack Lambert, who were injured and replaced by Ed Bradley and Loren Toews for most of the second half. On the other hand, Pittsburgh had 333 yards of total offense. Harris, who ran for a Super Bowl record 158 yards (more than the entire Minnesota offense) and a touchdown, was named the Super Bowl's Most Valuable Player.

== Background ==
=== Host selection process ===
The NFL awarded Super Bowl IX to New Orleans on April 3, 1973, at the owners' meetings held in Scottsdale, Arizona. This was the third time that the Super Bowl was played in New Orleans, after IV and VI. Super Bowl IX was originally planned to be held at the Louisiana Superdome, which was under construction at the time of the vote. However, construction delays at the Superdome (which pushed its opening to August 1975) forced the league to move the game to Tulane Stadium, where the city's previous two Super Bowls were held. This ended up being the last professional American football game played at Tulane Stadium.

For the second time, the owners selected two consecutive Super Bowl host cities at the same meeting. Only three cities submitted bids for the two games. Representatives from New Orleans, Miami, and Los Angeles each made presentations; all three cities had already hosted the Super Bowl. New Orleans impressed owners with their Superdome plans, and won a unanimous vote to host the game, while Miami was given Super Bowl X.

=== Pittsburgh Steelers ===
Pittsburgh advanced to their first Super Bowl and was playing for a league championship for the first time in team history. Their 73-year-old owner Art Rooney founded the Steelers as a 1933 NFL expansion team, but suffered through losing seasons for most of its 42-year history and had never made it to an NFL championship game or a Super Bowl. But in 1969, Rooney hired Chuck Noll to be the team's head coach and its fortunes started to turn following a disastrous 1–13 first year under the future Hall of Fame coach.

Noll rebuilt the Steelers through the NFL draft, selecting defensive tackle Joe Greene and defensive end L. C. Greenwood in his first season as head coach. In 1970, Noll drafted quarterback Terry Bradshaw and cornerback Mel Blount. In 1971, linebacker Jack Ham, defensive tackle Ernie Holmes, defensive end Dwight White, and safety Mike Wagner were selected by the team. Fullback Franco Harris was drafted in 1972. And in 1974, the Steelers picked linebacker Jack Lambert, center Mike Webster and wide receivers Lynn Swann and John Stallworth, and signed safety Donnie Shell as a free agent. Bradshaw, Webster, Swann, Stallworth, and Harris ended up being Hall of Fame players on offense, while the others formed the core nucleus of their "Steel Curtain" defense, including future Hall of Famers Greene, Ham, Blount, Lambert and Shell.

But en route to Super Bowl IX, the Steelers had started the regular season slowly, as Bradshaw and Joe Gilliam fought to be the team's starting quarterback. Gilliam had started for the first four games of the season, but Noll eventually made Bradshaw the starter. Although Bradshaw ended up completing only 67 out of 148 passes for 785 yards, 7 touchdowns, and 8 interceptions, he helped lead the team to a 10–3–1 regular-season record. The Steelers' main offensive weapon, however, was running the ball. Harris rushed for 1,006 yards and five touchdowns, while also catching 23 passes for 200 yards and another touchdown. Running backs Rocky Bleier, Preston Pearson, and Steve Davis also made important contributions, gaining a combined total of 936 yards and eight touchdowns. Receiver Lynn Swann returned 41 punts for a league-leading 577 yards and a touchdown.

But the Steelers' main strength during the season was their staunch "Steel Curtain" defense, which led the league with the fewest total yards allowed (3,074) and the fewest passing yards allowed (1,466). Greene won the NFL Defensive Player of the Year Award for the second time in the previous three seasons, and he and L. C. Greenwood were named to the Pro Bowl. Both of the team's outside linebackers, Ham and Andy Russell, had been also selected to play in the Pro Bowl, while Lambert already had two interceptions for 19 yards in his rookie year. In the defensive backfield, Blount, Wagner, and Glen Edwards made a strong impact against opposing passing plays.

=== Minnesota Vikings ===
The Vikings came into the season trying to redeem themselves after a one sided Super Bowl VIII loss after which they became the first team to lose two Super Bowls (the other loss was in Super Bowl IV).

Minnesota's powerful offense was still led by veteran quarterback Fran Tarkenton, who passed for 2,598 yards and 17 touchdowns. The Vikings' primary offensive weapon was running back Chuck Foreman, who led the team in receptions with 53 for 586 yards and six touchdowns. He was also their leading rusher with 777 rushing yards and nine touchdowns. Wide receivers Jim Lash and John Gilliam were major deep threats, having 32 receptions for 631 yards (a 19.7 yards per catch average) and 26 receptions for 578 yards (a 22.5 ypc average), respectively. Fullback Dave Osborn contributed with 514 rushing yards, and 29 receptions for 196 yards. And the Vikings' offensive line, led by future Hall of Famers right tackle Ron Yary and center Mick Tingelhoff, allowed only 17 sacks.

Aided by the "Purple People Eaters" defense, led by future Hall of Fame defensive linemen Carl Eller and Alan Page, and future Hall of Fame safety Paul Krause, the Vikings won the NFC Central for the sixth time in the previous seven seasons. Linebacker Jeff Siemon had 2 interceptions and 3 fumble recoveries. Minnesota's defense also featured cornerback Nate Wright, who led the team with 6 interceptions, and safety Jeff Wright, who had 4.

=== Playoffs ===
For the first time in four years, the Miami Dolphins were not able to advance to the Super Bowl. While the Steelers defeated the Buffalo Bills 32–14 in the first round, the favored Dolphins lost to the Oakland Raiders 28–26, giving up Raiders running back Clarence Davis' 8-yard touchdown reception with 26 seconds remaining in the game with a play now known as The Sea of Hands. The key play in the game occurred when the Dolphins were in control and were leading the Raiders 19–14 midway through the fourth quarter. Cliff Branch hauled in a 72-yard touchdown pass from Raiders quarterback Ken Stabler when third-year Dolphin defensive back Henry Stuckey, the man assigned to cover Branch on the play, fell down, and the resultant wide open Branch caught the bomb and sprinted to the end zone. After George Blanda kicked the PAT, the Raiders led 21–19. Dolphin fans were furious because fan favorite Lloyd Mumphord was replaced with Stuckey. Mumphord and head coach Don Shula were involved in a feud at the time, and it is thought that Stuckey was given the starting job for this game because of Shula's and Mumphord's differences of opinion. Afterwards, Stuckey was released in the offseason. Many believed that had Mumphord been in the game, there would have been no "Sea of Hands" play.

Meanwhile, Minnesota allowed only a combined 24 points in their playoff wins against the St. Louis Cardinals, 30–14, and their narrow defeat of the Los Angeles Rams, 14–10, after their defense stopped an attempted comeback touchdown drive from the Rams on the Vikings' own 2-yard line.

=== Super Bowl pregame news and notes ===
Sports writers and fans predicted that Super Bowl IX would be a low scoring game because of the two teams' defenses. The Steelers' "Steel Curtain" had led the AFC in fewest points allowed (189) and the Vikings' "Purple People Eaters" had only given up 195.

As the NFC was the designated "home team" for the game, by NFL rules at the time the Vikings were required to wear their purple jerseys. Although the league later relaxed the rule from Super Bowl XIII onwards, the Vikings would've likely worn their purple jerseys anyway, given that they've worn their purple jerseys at home for much of their history aside from a few games in the 1960s, when the NFL was encouraging (but not requiring) teams to wear white at home. This was the only one of the four Super Bowls the Steelers of the 1970s played in that the team wore their white jerseys, and the only Super Bowl the team would wear white at all until Super Bowl XL 31 years later.

This was the first post-merger Super Bowl to not feature an East Division team from either conference. The previous season's Vikings were the only non-East Division team to appear in any of the previous four Super Bowls.

This would be the final Super Bowl to feature the flag style pylons.

=== Game conditions ===
When the NFL awarded Super Bowl IX to New Orleans on April 3, 1973, the game was originally scheduled to be played at the Louisiana Superdome. By July 1974, construction on the dome was not yet finished, and so the league reverted to Tulane Stadium, home field for Tulane University and the New Orleans Saints, and site of Super Bowls IV and VI. Dolphins owner Joe Robbie lobbied the NFL to move Super Bowl IX to the Orange Bowl, already scheduled to host Super Bowl X, and give New Orleans the January 1976 game, but the proposal was rejected.

This proved to be quite pivotal, because of the inclement conditions (low temperature and the field was slick from overnight rain). This was the last Super Bowl to be played in inclement weather for over thirty years, until Super Bowl XLI (and that game's weather issues in Miami were based on a driving rain, not the temperature). The game still holds the mark as the second-coldest outdoor temperature for an outdoor game, at a game-time temperature of 46 °F (8 °C) (only Super Bowl VI, also played at Tulane Stadium, had a colder game-time temperature, 39 °F (4 °C)) and expectations that Super Bowl XLVIII would break these records due to its winter location in outdoor New Jersey did not come to pass. (Seven Super Bowls - XVI in Pontiac, XXVI and LII in Minneapolis, XXVIII and XXXIV in Atlanta, XL in Detroit and XLVI in Indianapolis - have had colder outdoor temperatures but were played in fixed-roof stadiums, except XLVI at the retractable-roofed Lucas Oil Stadium, and the roof there was kept closed for the entire game.)

The change of venue meant this was not only the last of three Super Bowls played at Tulane Stadium, but the last professional game played in the stadium, which was demolished five years later and replaced for the 1975 NFL season by the Louisiana Superdome, which has hosted every Super Bowl held in New Orleans since.

The circumstances surrounding Super Bowl IX prompted the NFL to adopt a rule prohibiting a new stadium from hosting the Super Bowl following its first regular season. The rule was first invoked in 2018 when construction on SoFi Stadium for the Rams and Chargers in Inglewood, California fell behind schedule by a year, forcing the NFL to move Super Bowl LV to Tampa's Raymond James Stadium and instead playing Super Bowl LVI at SoFi, which opened for the 2020 season. (The first facility to host a Super Bowl in its second season was Miami's Joe Robbie Stadium, which opened in 1987 and hosted Super Bowl XXIII following the 1988 season.)

== Broadcasting ==
The game was broadcast in the United States by NBC with play-by-play announcer Curt Gowdy and color commentators Al DeRogatis and Don Meredith. Charlie Jones served as the event's field reporter and covered the trophy presentation; while hosting the coverage was NBC News reporter Jack Perkins and Jeannie Morris (Morris, then the wife of former Chicago Bears wide receiver and WMAQ-TV sports anchor Johnny Morris, became the first woman to participate in Super Bowl coverage). Prior to the 1975 NFL season, NBC did not have a regular pregame show.

=== In popular culture ===
The Mary Tyler Moore Show on CBS (which was set in Minneapolis) used this game as a plot line on the episode aired the night before the game. Lou Grant taught Ted Baxter how to bet on football games; yet over the course of the football season, Ted was the one who developed a winning strategy. They pooled their money and finished the regular season in the black. Since Ted's strategy would not work on the Super Bowl game's spread, it was agreed they would not place a bet on the Super Bowl. However Ted was crushed when it was revealed that Lou actually did place a (losing) bet. Lou bet all the season's winnings on the Steelers. At the end of the show, Mary Tyler Moore announced the following over the credits: "If the Pittsburgh Steelers win the actual Super Bowl tomorrow, we want to apologize to the Pittsburgh team and their fans for this purely fictional story. If on the other hand, they lose, remember, you heard it here first." And, as it turned out, her apology did go into effect.

== Entertainment ==
The Grambling State University Band from north Louisiana performed during the pregame festivities. Coincidentally, Tulane Stadium hosted the first Bayou Classic football game between Southwestern Athletic Conference archrivals Grambling and Southern seven weeks before the Super Bowl.

America the Beautiful and the national anthem was sung by the Mardi Gras Barbershop Chorus under the direction of Dr. Saul Schneider. This was the second Super Bowl in which America the Beautiful was sung, as the same song was sung by Charley Pride the year prior at Super Bowl IX. The halftime show was a tribute to American jazz composer, pianist and bandleader Duke Ellington, also featuring the Grambling State University Band along with Ellington's son Mercer. Ellington had died the previous May.

== Game summary ==
As many predicted, the game was low scoring; both teams failed to score a touchdown or a field goal until the third quarter and ended up with the third lowest total of combined points in Super Bowl history.

=== First quarter ===
The first quarter of the game was completely dominated by both teams' defenses. After both teams punted on their opening possessions, the Steelers started their second possession on their own 42-yard line. After a false start penalty on Pittsburgh offensive tackle Gordon Gravelle pushed the team back to their own 37, they advanced into Minnesota territory on an 18-yard run by running back Rocky Bleier. Two plays later, however, a 10-yard clipping penalty on Pittsburgh pushed the team back to their own 44-yard line, but they got those yards back with a 12-yard pass by quarterback Terry Bradshaw to wide receiver Frank Lewis to bring up 3rd-and-9. On the next play, however, defensive tackle Alan Page sacked Bradshaw for a 7-yard loss, forcing Pittsburgh to punt the ball back to Minnesota. After forcing the Vikings to punt again, this time from their own end zone, the Steelers started their next possession at the Minnesota 44. On 3rd-and-7, Bradshaw completed a 15-yard pass to tight end Larry Brown to put Pittsburgh in scoring position. The drive stalled at the Vikings' 21-yard line, so kicker Roy Gerela attempted to kick a 37-yard field goal, but he missed it wide left. After another Minnesota punt, which put Pittsburgh on their own 47, the Steelers drove to the Vikings' 16-yard line, aided by a 14-yard run by running back Franco Harris and an 11-yard run by Bradshaw, but during Gerela's second field goal attempt, a 33-yarder, holder/punter Bobby Walden fumbled the snap and attempted to run the ball himself before getting tackled by linebacker Jeff Siemon, turning the ball back over to the Vikings and keeping the game scoreless.

In the first quarter, the Vikings were limited to 20 passing yards, no rushing yards, and one first down which occurred on their opening play with a Fran Tarkenton 16-yard completion to John Gilliam. The Steelers did slightly better with 18 passing yards, 61 rushing yards, and four first downs.

=== Second quarter ===
The Steelers forced another Vikings punt to start the second quarter and got the ball back on their own 14. On 3rd-and-4, Bradshaw completed a 21-yard pass to wide receiver Lynn Swann, but this was nullified by an offensive pass interference penalty on Swann, who would not have a pass reception in the game. On the next play, safety Jeff Wright stripped the ball from Bleier, and safety Randy Poltl recovered the fumble at the Steelers' 24-yard line. The Vikings failed to capitalize on the turnover, as they could only move the ball 2 yards in their next three plays, and kicker Fred Cox missed a 39-yard field goal attempt wide right. On their next possession, the Steelers converted a 3rd-and-8 with the longest gain so far in the game, a 22-yard pass from Bradshaw to wide receiver John Stallworth. Pittsburgh could not get past the Minnesota 45 and were forced to punt, but Walden booted a 39-yarder, and wide receiver Sam McCullum did not allow the ball to reach the end zone, then failed to make a return and was downed at the Viking 7-yard line by Pittsburgh safety Donnie Shell. The first score of the game occurred two plays later, when running back Dave Osborn fumbled a handoff from quarterback Fran Tarkenton at the 10, and the ball rolled backward into the end zone. Tarkenton recovered the ball in the end zone to prevent a Steelers touchdown, but he was downed by defensive end Dwight White for a safety, giving Pittsburgh a 2–0 lead. It was the first safety scored in Super Bowl history. The Vikings forced a three-and-out, then got a chance to take their first lead of the game when Tarkenton led them on a 55-yard drive to the Steelers' 25-yard line from their own 20, aided by a pass interference penalty on cornerback Mel Blount and a 17-yard pass by Tarkenton that was bobbled and caught by running back Chuck Foreman on 3rd-and-8. With 1:17 left in the half, Tarkenton threw a pass to wide receiver John Gilliam at the 5-yard line, but Steelers safety Glen Edwards broke up the pass as Gilliam caught it, batting the ball high into the air and into the arms of Blount for an interception.

The half ended with the Steelers leading 2–0, the lowest halftime score in Super Bowl history and lowest possible, barring a scoreless tie.

=== Third quarter ===
On the opening kickoff of the second half, Vikings fullback Bill Brown fumbled the ball on an unintentional squib kick after Gerela slipped on the wet field and only extended his leg halfway for the kick. Steelers linebacker Marv Kellum recovered the fumble at the Minnesota 30-yard line. On the first play of the drive, Harris moved the ball to the 6-yard line with a 24-yard run. After being tackled by Vikings linebacker Wally Hilgenberg for a 3-yard loss, Harris scored on a 9-yard touchdown run, giving Pittsburgh a 9–0 lead.

After an exchange of punts, Minnesota got the ball back on their own 20-yard line. On the second play of drive, Tarkenton's pass was deflected behind the line of scrimmage by Pittsburgh defensive end L. C. Greenwood, and bounced back right into the arms of Tarkenton, who then threw a 41-yard completion to Gilliam. Officials ruled Tarkenton's first pass attempt as a completion to himself, and thus his second attempt was an illegal forward pass. After the penalty, facing 3rd-and-11, Minnesota got the first down with Foreman's 12-yard run. Three plays later, Tarkenton completed a 28-yard pass to tight end Stu Voigt at the Steelers' 45-yard line. But two plays later, White deflected Tarkenton's next pass attempt, and defensive tackle Joe Greene intercepted the ball, ending the Vikings' best offensive scoring opportunity.

=== Fourth quarter ===
After an exchange of punts to start the fourth quarter, the Vikings got another scoring opportunity when safety Paul Krause recovered a fumble by Harris on the Steelers' 47-yard line. On the next play, a deep pass attempt from Tarkenton to Gilliam drew a 42-yard pass interference penalty on Pittsburgh safety Mike Wagner that moved the ball up to the 5-yard line, but once again, the Steelers stopped them from scoring when Foreman lost a fumble that was recovered by Greene. The Steelers failed to get a first down on their next possession and were forced to punt from deep in their own territory. The next play finally got Minnesota on the board. Vikings linebacker Matt Blair burst through the line to block Walden's punt, and safety Terry Brown recovered the ball in the end zone for a touchdown. Cox's extra point attempt hit the left upright, but the Vikings had cut their deficit to 9–6 and were just a field goal away from a tie.

However, on the ensuing drive, the Steelers responded with a 66-yard, 11-play scoring drive that took 6:47 off the clock and featured three successful third down conversions. The first third down conversion was a key 30-yard pass completion from Bradshaw to Larry Brown, who fumbled the ball as he was being tackled by safety Jackie Wallace, and two officials (back judge Ray Douglas and field judge Dick Dolack) initially ruled the ball recovered for the Vikings by Siemon, but head linesman Ed Marion overruled their call, stating that Brown was downed at the contact before the ball came out of his hands (prior to the addition of the side judge in 1978, the head linesman had responsibility for his entire sideline). Faced with 2nd-and-15 after an illegal formation penalty, the Steelers then fooled the Vikings' defense with a misdirection play. Harris ran left past Bradshaw after the snap, drawing in the defense with him, while Bleier took a handoff and ran right through a gaping hole in the line for a 17-yard gain to the Vikings 16-yard line. A few plays later, Bradshaw converted a 3rd-and-5 situation with a 6-yard pass to Bleier that put the ball on the Vikings' 5-yard line. The Steelers gained just one yard with their next two plays, setting up 3rd-and-goal from the 4-yard line. On the next play, Bradshaw threw a 4-yard touchdown pass to Brown, giving the Steelers a 16–6 lead with 3:31 remaining and essentially putting the game away.

Vikings running back Brent McClanahan returned the ensuing kickoff 22 yards to the Minnesota 39-yard line, but on the first play of the drive, Tarkenton's pass to Gilliam was intercepted by Wagner. The Steelers then executed 7 consecutive running plays (including a 15-yard run by Harris totaling up to 158 rushing yards for him, which broke Larry Csonka's rushing record of 145 yards in Super Bowl VIII), taking the game clock all the way down to 38 seconds remaining before turning the ball over on downs. The Vikings ran two more plays before the game ended.

Harris finished the game with 34 carries for a Super Bowl record 158 yards and a touchdown; Harris' record stood until the Washington Redskins' John Riggins rushed for 166 yards in Super Bowl XVII. Bleier had 65 rushing yards, and two receptions for 11 yards. Pittsburgh finished with a total of 57 rushing attempts, which remains the Super Bowl record through Super Bowl LVII. Bradshaw completed nine out of 14 passes for 96 yards and a touchdown. Tarkenton completed 11 of 26 passes for 102 yards with 3 interceptions, for a passer rating of only 14.1. Foreman was the Vikings' top offensive contributor, finishing the game as the team's leading rusher and receiver with 18 rushing yards and 50 receiving yards.

The loss was the Vikings' record-setting third in Super Bowl play. Bud Grant vented frustration by saying, "There were three bad teams out there - us, Pittsburgh and the officials.” Minnesota, among many negatives to this point in its Super Bowl history of three games, had only two scoring drives on offense, and only three turnovers forced on defense, none of which resulted in any points. The win made the Steelers' Chuck Noll the youngest head coach to win the Super Bowl at the time (He was 42 years, 7 days).

=== Box score ===
Super Bowl IX: Pittsburgh Steelers 16, Minnesota Vikings 6

Quarter	1	2	3	4	Total
Steelers (AFC)	0	2	7	7	16
Vikings (NFC)	0	0	0	6	6

at Tulane Stadium, New Orleans, Louisiana

- Date: January 12, 1975
- Game time: 2:00 p.m. CST
- Game weather: 46 °F (8 °C), cloudy and windy
- Game attendance: 80,997 (tickets sold); 79,065 (actual; 1,932 no-shows)
- Referee: Bernie Ulman
- TV announcers (NBC): Curt Gowdy, Al DeRogatis, Don Meredith, Charlie Jones

Scoring summary

Quarter	Time	Drive			Team	Scoring information	Score	
Quarter	Time	Plays	Yards	TOP	Team	Scoring information	PIT	MIN
2	7:11	—	—	—	PIT	−10-yard fumble, Fran Tarkenton tackled in the end zone by Dwight White for a safety	2	0
3	13:25	4	30	1:24	PIT	Franco Harris 9-yard touchdown run, Roy Gerela kick good	9	0
4	10:33	—	—	—	MIN	Terry Brown recovered blocked punt in end zone, Fred Cox kick no good (hit left upright)	9	6
4	3:31	11	66	6:47	PIT	Larry Brown 4-yard touchdown reception from Terry Bradshaw, Gerela kick good	16	6
"TOP" = time of possession. For other American football terms, see Glossary of American football.							16	6

== Final statistics ==
Sources: NFL.com Super Bowl IX, Super Bowl IX Play Finder Pit, Super Bowl IX Play Finder Min

=== Statistical comparison ===
	Pittsburgh Steelers	Minnesota Vikings
First downs	17	9
First downs rushing	11	2
First downs passing	5	5
First downs penalty	1	2
Third down efficiency	6/17	5/12
Fourth down efficiency	0/2	0/0
Net yards rushing	249	17
Rushing attempts	57	21
Yards per rush	4.4	0.8
Passing – Completions/attempts	9/14	11/26
Times sacked-total yards	2–12	0–0
Interceptions thrown	0	3
Net yards passing	84	102
Total net yards	333	119
Punt returns-total yards	5–36	4–12
Kickoff returns-total yards	3–32	3–50
Interceptions-total return yards	3–46	0–0
Punts-average yardage	7–34.7	6–37.2
Fumbles-lost	4–2	3–2
Penalties-total yards	8–122	4–18
Time of possession	38:47	21:13
Turnovers	2	5

=== Individual statistics ===
Steelers passing
	C/ATT^{1}	Yds	TD	INT	Rating
Terry Bradshaw	9/14	96	1	0	108.0
Steelers rushing
	Car^{2}	Yds	TD	LG^{3}	Yds/Car
Franco Harris	34	158	1	25	4.65
Rocky Bleier	17	65	0	18	3.82
Terry Bradshaw	5	33	0	17	6.60
Lynn Swann	1	–7	0	–7	–7.00
Steelers receiving
	Rec^{4}	Yds	TD	LG^{3}	Target^{5}
Larry Brown	3	49	1	30	4
John Stallworth	3	24	0	22	4
Rocky Bleier	2	11	0	6	2
Frank Lewis	1	12	0	12	4

Vikings passing
	C/ATT^{1}	Yds	TD	INT	Rating
Fran Tarkenton	11/26	102	0	3	14.1
Vikings rushing
	Car^{2}	Yds	TD	LG^{3}	Yds/Car
Chuck Foreman	12	18	0	12	1.50
Fran Tarkenton	1	0	0	0	0.00
Dave Osborn	8	–1	0	2	–0.13
Vikings receiving
	Rec^{4}	Yds	TD	LG^{3}	Target^{5}
Chuck Foreman	5	50	0	17	8
Stu Voigt	2	31	0	28	4
Dave Osborn	2	7	0	4	2
John Gilliam	1	16	0	16	5
Oscar Reed	1	–2	0	–2	1
Jim Lash	0	0	0	0	1

^{1}Completions/attempts ^{2}Carries ^{3}Long gain ^{4}Receptions ^{5}Times targeted

=== Records set ===
The following records were set or tied in Super Bowl IX, according to the official NFL.com boxscore and the ProFootball reference.com game summary. Some records have to meet NFL minimum number of attempts to be recognized. The minimums are shown (in parentheses).

Records Set in Super Bowl IX
Passing Records
Most attempts, career	54	Fran Tarkenton (Minnesota)
Rushing Records
Most yards, game	158	Franco Harris (Pittsburgh)
Most attempts, game	34	Franco Harris (Pittsburgh)
Most rushing yards, game, quarterback	33	Terry Bradshaw (Pittsburgh)
Combined yardage records ^{†}
Combined yardage Most attempts, game	35	Franco Harris
Most yards gained, game	158	Franco Harris
Fumbles
Most fumbles, game	2	Franco Harris
Defense
Most safeties, game	1	Dwight White (Pittsburgh)
Special Teams
Most punts, career	17	Mike Eischeid (Minnesota)
Highest average, punt return yardage, game (3 returns)	11.3 yards (3–34)	Lynn Swann
Records Tied
Most completions, career	29	Fran Tarkenton
Most interceptions thrown, game	3	Fran Tarkenton
Most interceptions thrown, career	4	Fran Tarkenton
Most receptions, career	10	Chuck Foreman (Minnesota)
Most fumbles, career	2	Franco Harris; Fran Tarkenton

- † This category includes rushing, receiving, interception returns, punt returns, kickoff returns, and fumble returns.
- ‡ Sacks an official statistic since Super Bowl XVII by the NFL. Sacks are listed as "Tackled Attempting to Pass" in the official NFL box score for Super Bowl II.

Team records set
Most Super Bowl losses	3	Vikings
Most consecutive Super Bowl losses	2	Vikings
Scoring
Most safeties, game	1	Steelers
Net yards
Fewest net yards, rushing and passing	119	Vikings
Rushing
Most rushing attempts	57	Steelers
Fewest rushing yards (net)	17	Vikings
Lowest average gain per rush attempt	0.8	Vikings (17–21)
First downs
Fewest first downs	9	Vikings
Defense
Fewest yards allowed	119	Steelers
Most safeties, game	1	Steelers
Punt returns
Most yards gained, game	36	Steelers
Records Tied
Most Super Bowl appearances	3	Vikings
Fewest points, first half	0	Vikings
Fewest rushing touchdowns	0	Vikings
Fewest passing touchdowns	0	Vikings
Fewest first downs rushing	2	Vikings
Fewest times sacked	0	Vikings
Fewest sacks made	0	Steelers
Most punt returns, game	5	Steelers

Turnovers are defined as the number of times losing the ball on interceptions and fumbles.

Records Set, both team totals
	Total	Steelers	Vikings
Points
Fewest points scored, first half	2	2	0
Net yards, Both Teams
Fewest net yards, rushing and passing	452	333	119
Rushing, Both Teams
Most rushing attempts	78	57	21
Passing, Both Teams
Fewest passes completed	20	9	11
First downs, Both Teams
Fewest first downs, passing	10	5	5
Fumbles, Both Teams
Most fumbles	7	4	3
Punt returns, Both Teams
Most punt returns, game	9	5	4
Most yards gained, game	48	36	12
Records tied, both team totals
Fewest (one point) extra points	2	(2–2)	(0–1)
Fewest field goals made	0	0	0
Fewest rushing touchdowns	1	1	0
Fewest times sacked	2	2	0
Most fumbles lost	4	2	2
Most punts, game	13	7	6

== Starting lineups ==
Hall of Fame‡

Pittsburgh	Position	Minnesota
Offense
Frank Lewis	WR	John Gilliam
Jon Kolb	LT	Charlie Goodrum
Jim Clack	LG	Andy Maurer
Ray Mansfield	C	Mick Tingelhoff‡
Gerry Mullins	RG	Ed White
Gordon Gravelle	RT	Ron Yary‡
Larry Brown	TE	Stu Voigt
Ronnie Shanklin	WR	Jim Lash
Terry Bradshaw‡	QB	Fran Tarkenton‡
Franco Harris‡	RB	Dave Osborn
Rocky Bleier	RB	Chuck Foreman
Defense
L. C. Greenwood	LE	Carl Eller‡
Joe Greene‡	LT	Doug Sutherland
Ernie Holmes	RT	Alan Page‡
Dwight White	RE	Jim Marshall
Jack Ham‡	LLB	Roy Winston
Jack Lambert‡	MLB	Jeff Siemon
Andy Russell	RLB	Wally Hilgenberg
J. T. Thomas	LCB	Jackie Wallace
Mel Blount‡	RCB	Nate Wright
Mike Wagner	LS	Jeff Wright
Glen Edwards	RS	Paul Krause‡

== Officials ==
- Referee: Bernie Ulman #6, second Super Bowl on field (I as head linesman); alternate for VI
- Umpire: Al Conway #27, first Super Bowl
- Head linesman: Ed Marion #26, second Super Bowl (V)
- Line judge: Bruce Alford #24, third Super Bowl (II, VII)
- Back judge: Ray Douglas #5, first Super Bowl
- Field judge: Dick Dolack #31, first Super Bowl
- Alternate referee: Fred Silva #81, worked Super Bowl XIV as referee
- Alternate umpire: Dave Hamilton #42, never had an on-field Super Bowl assignment

Bruce Alford was the first official to be honored with three Super Bowl assignments.

Bernie Ulman was the first official to be the referee for a Super Bowl after working a previous Super Bowl at another position. This would not happen again until Dick Hantak was the referee for Super Bowl XXVII after serving as back judge for Super Bowl XVII.

Note: A seven-official system was not used until the 1978 season
