= 1981 Pittsburgh Steelers season =

NFL team season

- Owner: Art Rooney
- General manager: Dick Haley
- Head coach: Chuck Noll
- Home stadium: Three Rivers Stadium

Results
- Record: 8–8
- Division place: 2nd AFC Central
- Playoffs: Did not qualify
- All-Pros: Mel Blount (1st team); Jack Lambert (1st team); Mike Webster (1st team); Donnie Shell (2nd team)
- Pro Bowlers: CB Mel Blount; LB Jack Lambert; S Donnie Shell; C Mike Webster
- Team MVP: Jack Lambert

The 1981 Pittsburgh Steelers season was the franchise's 49th in the National Football League. After enduring an injury plagued 9–7 season the previous year and missing the playoffs for the first time since 1971, the Steelers had hoped that the 1980 season was just a small hiatus from contending for championships. However, while the Steelers had flashes of their former glory years after starting the season with 2 unimpressive losses, the 1981 season would end in an 8–8 record and eventually prove the end of the Steelers great dynasty of the 1970s. The Steelers had a chance to make the playoffs with an 8–5 start to the year but lost all of their last three games to miss the playoffs after Terry Bradshaw broke his hand early in the 14th game of the season versus the Raiders.

== Offseason ==
=== NFL draft ===
1981 Pittsburgh Steelers draft
Round	Pick	Player	Position	College	Notes
1	17	Keith Gary	Defensive end	Oklahoma	
2	44	Anthony Washington	Cornerback	Fresno State	
3	73	Rick Donnalley	Center	North Carolina	
4	100	Robbie Martin	Wide receiver	Cal Poly	
5	127	Ricky Martin	Wide receiver	New Mexico	
6	156	Bryan Hinkle	Linebacker	Oregon	
7	183	David Little *	Linebacker	Florida	
8	209	Frank Wilson	Running back	Rice	
Made roster

=== Undrafted free agents ===
1981 undrafted free agents of note
Player	Position	College
Nelson Bolden	Running back	Findlay
Charles Bruton	Safety	SMU
Plummer Bullock	Defensive end	Virginia Union
Tony Carifa	Safety	Ohio
Ray Cockrell	Tight end	Baylor
Larry Coffey	Running back	West Virginia Wesleyan
Willie Collier	Wide receiver	Pittsburgh
James Cowins	Wide receiver	Oklahoma State
Joe Cugliari	Defensive tackle	Indiana (Pa.)
Dean Cvitkovic	Linebacker	Morehead State
Bill Danenhauer	Center	Nebraska-Omaha
Mike Dombrowski	Tight end	Pittsburgh
Bill Dudash	Defensive tackle	Kent State
Steve Fedell	Linebacker	Pittsburgh
Jeff Finn	Tight end	Nebraska
Artrell Hawkins	Wide receiver	Pittsburgh
Curtis Henderson	Wide receiver	Morgan State
Ricky Isaac	Defensive end	Northeast Louisiana
Dana Noel	Safety	Minnesota
Rudy Phillips	Guard	North Texas State
Alvis Prince	Defensive tackle	Prairie View A&M
Robby Robson	Running back	Youngstown State
David Trout	Kicker	Pittsburgh

== Staff ==
1981 Pittsburgh Steelers staff
Front office: Chairman of the board – Arthur J. Rooney; President – Daniel M. Rooney; Vice president – John R. McGinley; Vice president – Arthur J. Rooney, Jr.; Controller – Dennis P. Thimons; Traveling secretary – James A. Boston; Public relations director – Ed Kiely; Publicity director – Joe Gordon; Assistant publicity director – John Evenson; Director of ticket sales – Geraldine Glenn; Director of player personnel – Dick Haley; Assistant director of player personnel – William Nunn, Jr.; Talent scout – West Coast – Bob Schmitz; Pro talent scout – Tom Modrak; College talent scout – Joe Krupa; Head coaches: Head coach – Chuck Noll; Assistant head coach – George Perles; Offensive coaches: Offensive line – Rollie Dotsch; Offensive backfield – Dick Hoak; Receivers – Tom Moore	Defensive coaches: Defensive coordinator – Woody Widenhofer; Defensive assistant – Tony Dungy; Defensive backfield – Dick Walker; Strength and conditioning: Paul Uram; Physician, M.D. – Dr. David S. Huber; Physician, M.D. – Dr. Anthony P. Yates; Physician, orthopedic – Dr. Paul Steele; Neurological surgery consultant – Dr. Joseph C. Maroon; Dentist – Dr. George P. Boucek; Ophthalmologist – Dr. Phillip Buzzelli; Trainer – Ralph Berlin; Assistant trainer – Gary Stragar; Equipment manager – Anthony Parisi; Field manager – Rodgers Freyvogel; Film director – Bob McCartney; Photographers – Harry Homa, Bill Amatucci

=== Roster ===
1981 Pittsburgh Steelers roster
Quarterbacks (QB): 12 Terry Bradshaw; 16 Mark Malone; Running backs (RB): 45 Russell Davis; 32 Franco Harris; 27 Greg Hawthorne; 39 Rick Moser; 44 Frank Pollard; 38 Sidney Thornton; Wide receivers (WR): 86 Jim Smith; 82 John Stallworth; 88 Lynn Swann; 85 Calvin Sweeney; Tight ends (TE): 89 Bennie Cunningham; 84 Randy Grossman	Offensive linemen (OL): 79 Larry Brown T; 77 Steve Courson G; 62 Tunch Ilkin T; 55 Jon Kolb T; 61 Tyrone McGriff G; 74 Ray Pinney T; 52 Mike Webster C; 73 Craig Wolfley G; Defensive linemen (DL): 76 John Banaszak DE; 65 Tom Beasley DT; 67 Gary Dunn DT; 95 John Goodman DE; 75 Joe Greene DT; 68 L. C. Greenwood DE; 90 Bob Kohrs DE	Linebackers (LB): 56 Robin Cole OLB; 59 Jack Ham OLB; 58 Jack Lambert MLB; 50 David Little MLB; 51 Loren Toews OLB; 54 Zack Valentine MLB; 53 Dennis Winston OLB; Defensive backs (DB): 30 Larry Anderson CB; 47 Mel Blount CB; 29 Ron Johnson CB/S; 31 Donnie Shell SS; 26 J. T. Thomas FS; 42 Anthony Washington CB; 49 Dwayne Woodruff CB; Special teams (ST): 5 Craig Colquitt P; 1 David Trout K	Reserve: 78 Joe Cugliari DT (IR); -- Rick Donnalley C/G (IR); -- Steve Fedell LB (IR); 46 Bryan Hinkle LB (IR); 25 Ricky Martin WR (IR); 66 Ted Petersen T (IR); 18 Cliff Stoudt QB (IR); 37 Frank Wilson TE (IR); Rookies in italics 45 active, 8 reserve

== Preseason ==
=== Schedule ===
Week	Date	Opponent	Game Site	Kickoff (ET)	TV	Result	Record
1	August 8	at Cleveland Browns	Cleveland Municipal Stadium	7:30 p.m.	WPXI	W 34–31	1–0
2	August 15	at Philadelphia Eagles	Veterans Stadium	6:00 p.m.	WPXI	L 36–20	1–1
3	August 22	at Dallas Cowboys	Texas Stadium	9:00 p.m.	NBC	L 24–14	1–2
4	August 29	New York Giants	Three Rivers Stadium	6:00 p.m.	WPXI	W 31–6	2–2

== Regular season ==
=== Schedule ===
Week	Date	Opponent	Game Site	Kickoff (ET)	TV	Result	Record
1	September 6	Kansas City Chiefs	Three Rivers Stadium	1:00 p.m.	NBC	**L** 37–33	0–1
2	September 10	at Miami Dolphins	Miami Orange Bowl	8:30 p.m.	ABC	**L** 30–10	0–2
3	September 20	New York Jets	Three Rivers Stadium	1:00 p.m.	NBC	**W** 38–10	1–2
4	September 27	New England Patriots	Three Rivers Stadium	1:00 p.m.	NBC	**W** 27–21 (OT)	2–2
5	October 4	at New Orleans Saints	Louisiana Superdome	2:00 p.m.	NBC	**W** 20–6	3–2
6	October 11	**Cleveland Browns**	Three Rivers Stadium	1:00 p.m.	NBC	**W** 13–7	4–2
7	October 18	at **Cincinnati Bengals**	Riverfront Stadium	1:00 p.m.	NBC	**L** 34–7	4–3
8	October 26	**Houston Oilers**	Three Rivers Stadium	9:00 p.m.	ABC	**W** 26–13	5–3
9	November 1	San Francisco 49ers	Three Rivers Stadium	1:00 p.m.	CBS	**L** 17–14	5–4
10	November 8	at Seattle Seahawks	Kingdome	4:00 p.m.	NBC	**L** 24–21	5–5
11	November 15	at Atlanta Falcons	Atlanta–Fulton County Stadium	1:00 p.m.	NBC	**W** 34–20	6–5
12	November 22	at **Cleveland Browns**	Cleveland Municipal Stadium	1:00 p.m.	NBC	**W** 32–10	7–5
13	November 29	Los Angeles Rams	Three Rivers Stadium	1:00 p.m.	CBS	**W** 24–0	8–5
14	December 7	at Oakland Raiders	Oakland–Alameda County Coliseum	9:00 p.m.	ABC	**L** 30–27	8–6
15	December 13	**Cincinnati Bengals**	Three Rivers Stadium	1:00 p.m.	NBC	**L** 17–10	8–7
16	December 20	at **Houston Oilers**	Astrodome	4:00 p.m.	NBC	**L** 21–20	8–8

Note: Intra-division opponents are in bold text.

=== Game summaries ===
==== Week 1 (Sunday, September 6, 1981): vs. Kansas City Chiefs ====
	1	2	3	4	Total
**Chiefs**	10	3	10	14	**37**
Steelers	6	13	7	7	**33**

at Three Rivers Stadium, Pittsburgh, Pennsylvania

- Game time: 1:00 pm EDT
- Game weather: 67 °F or 19.4 °C, wind 5 miles per hour (8.0 km/h; 4.3 kn)
- Game attendance: 53,305
- Referee: Jim Tunney
- TV announcers: (NBC) Bob Costas (play by play), Bob Trumpy (color commentator)

Scoring drives:

- Pittsburgh – Swann 18 pass from Bradshaw (kick failed)
- Kansas City – Marshall 48 pass from Kenney (Lowery kick)
- Kansas City – FG Lowery 35
- Pittsburgh – Harris 7 run (kick failed)
- Pittsburgh – Harris 1 run (Trout kick)
- Kansas City – FG Lowery 40
- Kansas City – Carson 53 pass from Kenney (Lowery kick)
- Pittsburgh – Hawthorne 1 run (Trout kick)
- Kansas City – FG Lowery 42
- Kansas City – McKnight 3 run (Lowery kick)
- Pittsburgh – Smith 41 pass from Bradshaw (Trout kick)
- Kansas City – Howard 65 fumble return (Lowery kick)

==== Week 2 (Thursday, September 10, 1981): at Miami Dolphins ====
	1	2	3	4	Total
Steelers	3	7	0	0	**10**
**Dolphins**	0	13	14	3	**30**

at Miami Orange Bowl, Miami, Florida

- Game time: 8:30 pm EDT
- Game weather: 81 °F or 27.2 °C, wind 10 miles per hour (16 km/h; 8.7 kn)
- Game attendance: 74,190
- Referee: Red Cashion
- TV announcers: (ABC) Frank Gifford (play by play), Fran Tarkenton & Howard Cosell (color commentators)

Scoring drives:

- Pittsburgh – FG Trout 23
- Miami – Woodley 1 run (kick failed)
- Miami – Franklin 1 run (von Schamann kick)
- Pittsburgh – Smith 32 pass from Bradshaw (Trout kick)
- Miami – Nathan 13 pass from Woodley (von Schamann kick)
- Miami – Vigorito 87 punt return (von Schamann kick)
- Miami – FG von Schamann 32

==== Week 3 (Sunday, September 20, 1981): vs. New York Jets ====
	1	2	3	4	Total
Jets	0	3	0	7	**10**
**Steelers**	7	10	14	7	**38**

at Three Rivers Stadium, Pittsburgh, Pennsylvania

- Game time: 1:00 pm EDT
- Game weather: 59 °F or 15 °C, wind 17 miles per hour (27 km/h; 15 kn)
- Game attendance: 52,973
- Referee: Gordon McCarter
- TV announcers: (NBC) Don Criqui (play by play), John Brodie (color commentator)

Scoring drives:

- Pittsburgh – Davis 9 run (Trout kick)
- Pittsburgh – FG Trout 25
- Pittsburgh – Pollard 23 run (Trout kick)
- New York Jets – FG Leahy 47
- Pittsburgh – Bradshaw 1 run (Trout kick)
- Pittsburgh – Pollard 1 run (Trout kick)
- Pittsburgh – Thornton 1 run (Trout kick)
- New York Jets – McNeil 17 pass from Ryan (Leahy kick)

==== Week 4 (Sunday, September 27, 1981): vs. New England Patriots ====
	1	2	3	4	OT	Total
Patriots	0	7	0	14	0	**21**
**Steelers**	7	7	7	0	6	**27**

at Three Rivers Stadium, Pittsburgh, Pennsylvania

- Game time: 1:00 pm EDT
- Game weather: 68 °F or 20 °C, wind 17 miles per hour (27 km/h; 15 kn)
- Game attendance: 53,344
- Referee: Gene Barth
- TV announcers: (NBC) Bob Costas (play by play), Bob Trumpy (color commentator)

Scoring drives:

- Pittsburgh – Harris 1 run (Trout kick)
- Pittsburgh – Cunningham 1 pass from Bradshaw (Trout kick)
- New England – Cavanaugh 1 run (Smith kick)
- Pittsburgh – Harris 1 run (Trout kick)
- New England – Collins 10 run (Smith kick)
- New England – Morgan 12 pass from Cavanaugh (Smith kick)
- Pittsburgh – Swann 24 pass from Bradshaw

==== Week 5 (Sunday, October 4, 1981): at New Orleans Saints ====
	1	2	3	4	Total
**Steelers**	7	6	0	7	**20**
Saints	0	3	3	0	**6**

at Louisiana Superdome, New Orleans, Louisiana

- Game time: 2:00 pm EDT
- Game weather: Dome
- Game attendance: 64,578
- Referee: Jerry Seeman
- TV announcers: (NBC) Sam Nover (play by play), Harmon Wages (color commentator)

Scoring drives:

- Pittsburgh – Swann 16 pass from Bradshaw (Trout kick)
- Pittsburgh – FG Trout 25
- New Orleans – FG Ricardo 26
- Pittsburgh – FG Trout 43
- New Orleans – FG Ricardo 33
- Pittsburgh – Stallworth 47 pass from Bradshaw (Trout kick)

==== Week 6 (Sunday, October 11, 1981): vs. Cleveland Browns ====
	1	2	3	4	Total
Browns	0	7	0	0	**7**
**Steelers**	7	3	0	3	**13**

at Three Rivers Stadium, Pittsburgh, Pennsylvania

- Game time: 1:00 pm EDT
- Game weather: 51 °F or 10.6 °C, wind 6 miles per hour (9.7 km/h; 5.2 kn)
- Game attendance: 53,255
- Referee: Ben Dreith
- TV announcers: (NBC) Don Criqui (play by play), John Brodie (color commentator)

Scoring drives:

- Pittsburgh – Stallworth 9 pass from Bradshaw (Trout kick)
- Pittsburgh – FG Trout 19
- Cleveland – Newsome 29 pass from Sipe (Bahr kick)
- Pittsburgh – FG Trout 23

==== Week 7 (Sunday, October 18, 1981): at Cincinnati Bengals ====
	1	2	3	4	Total
Steelers	0	0	0	7	**7**
**Bengals**	10	3	14	7	**34**

at Riverfront Stadium, Cincinnati, Ohio

- Game time: 1:00 pm EDT
- Game weather: 57 °F or 13.9 °C, wind 20 miles per hour (32 km/h; 17 kn)
- Game attendance: 57,090
- Referee: Jerry Markbreit
- TV announcers: (NBC) Don Criqui (play by play), John Brodie (color commentator)

Scoring drives:

- Cincinnati – FG Breech 27
- Cincinnati – Johnson 3 run (Breech kick)
- Cincinnati – FG Breech 23
- Cincinnati – Verser 73 pass from Ken Anderson (Breech kick)
- Cincinnati – Alexander 3 run (Breech kick)
- Cincinnati – Johnson 5 pass from Ken Anderson (Breech kick)
- Pittsburgh – Smith 17 pass from Bradshaw (Trout kick)

==== Week 8 (Monday, October 26, 1981): vs. Houston Oilers ====
	1	2	3	4	Total
Oilers	0	3	0	10	**13**
**Steelers**	10	3	0	13	**26**

at Three Rivers Stadium, Pittsburgh, Pennsylvania

- Game time: 9:00 pm EST
- Game weather: 53 °F or 11.7 °C, wind 10 miles per hour (16 km/h; 8.7 kn)
- Game attendance: 52,732
- Referee: Fred Silva
- TV announcers: (ABC) Frank Gifford (play by play), Don Meredith & Fran Tarkenton (color commentators)

Scoring drives:

- Pittsburgh – FG Trout 19
- Pittsburgh – Smith 46 pass from Bradshaw (Trout kick)
- Houston – FG Fritsch 34
- Pittsburgh – FG Trout 19
- Houston – Casper 52 pass from Stabler (Fritsch kick)
- Houston – FG Fritsch 44
- Pittsburgh – Stallworth 6 pass from Bradshaw (kick failed)
- Pittsburgh – Harris 1 run (Trout kick)

==== Week 9 (Sunday, November 1, 1981): vs. San Francisco 49ers ====
	1	2	3	4	Total
**49ers**	0	10	0	7	**17**
Steelers	0	0	14	0	**14**

at Three Rivers Stadium, Pittsburgh, Pennsylvania

- Game time: 1:00 pm EST
- Game weather: 50 °F or 10 °C, wind 8 miles per hour (13 km/h; 7.0 kn)
- Game attendance: 52,878
- Referee: Bob Frederic
- TV announcers: (CBS) Vin Scully (play by play), Hank Stram (color commentator)

Scoring drives:

- San Francisco – Young 5 pass from Montana (Wersching kick)
- San Francisco – FG Wersching 45
- Pittsburgh – Blount 50 interception return (Trout kick)
- Pittsburgh – Smith 22 pass from Bradshaw (Trout kick)
- San Francisco – Easley 1 run (Wersching kick)

==== Week 10 (Sunday, November 8, 1981): at Seattle Seahawks ====
	1	2	3	4	Total
Steelers	7	14	0	0	**21**
**Seahawks**	3	7	0	14	**24**

at The Kingdome, Seattle, Washington

- Game time: 4:00 pm EST
- Game weather: Dome
- Game attendance: 59,058
- Referee: Dick Jorgensen
- TV announcers: (NBC) Jay Randolph (play by play), Rocky Bleier (color commentator)

Scoring drives:

- Pittsburgh – Harris 6 run (Trout kick)
- Seattle – FG Herrera 37
- Pittsburgh – Malone 90 pass from Bradshaw (Trout kick)
- Pittsburgh – Thornton 4 run (Trout kick)
- Seattle – Doornink 44 pass from Zorn (Herrera kick)
- Seattle – T. Brown 1 run (Herrera kick)
- Seattle – T. Brown 1 run (Herrera kick)

==== Week 11 (Sunday, November 15, 1981): at Atlanta Falcons ====
	1	2	3	4	Total
**Steelers**	7	7	13	7	**34**
Falcons	0	7	3	10	**20**

at Atlanta–Fulton County Stadium, Atlanta, Georgia

- Game time: 1:00 pm EST
- Game weather: 53 °F or 11.7 °C, wind 11 miles per hour (18 km/h; 9.6 kn)
- Game attendance: 57,485
- Referee: Pat Haggerty
- TV announcers: (NBC) Bob Costas (play by play), Bob Trumpy (color commentator)

Scoring drives:

- Pittsburgh – Cunningham 18 pass from Bradshaw (Trout kick)
- Pittsburgh – Stallworth 6 pass from Bradshaw (Trout kick)
- Atlanta – Jackson 35 pass from Bartkowski (Luckhurst kick)
- Pittsburgh – Stallworth 19 pass from Bradshaw (Trout kick)
- Atlanta – FG Luckhurst 43
- Pittsburgh – Grossman 14 pass from Bradshaw (kick blocked)
- Atlanta – Jenkins 30 pass from Bartkowski (Luckhurst kick)
- Pittsburgh – Swann 22 pass from Bradshaw (Trout kick)
- Atlanta – FG Luckhurst 22

==== Week 12 (Sunday, November 22, 1981): at Cleveland Browns ====
	1	2	3	4	Total
**Steelers**	12	0	6	14	**32**
Browns	3	7	0	0	**10**

at Cleveland Municipal Stadium, Cleveland, Ohio

- Game time: 1:00 pm EST
- Game weather: 30 °F or −1.1 °C, wind 15 miles per hour (24 km/h; 13 kn)
- Game attendance: 77,958
- Referee: Gene Barth
- TV announcers: (NBC) Don Criqui (play by play), John Brodie (color commentator)

Scoring drives:

- Cleveland – FG Bahr 33
- Pittsburgh – Hawthorne 1 run (kick failed)
- Pittsburgh – Thornton 3 run (kick failed)
- Cleveland – Logan 13 pass from Sipe (Bahr kick)
- Pittsburgh – Harris 2 run (kick failed)
- Pittsburgh – Pinney 1 pass from Bradshaw (Trout kick)
- Pittsburgh – Moser 5 pass from Bradshaw (Trout kick)

==== Week 13 (Sunday, November 29, 1981): vs. Los Angeles Rams ====
	1	2	3	4	Total
Rams	0	0	0	0	**0**
**Steelers**	7	14	3	0	**24**

at Three Rivers Stadium, Pittsburgh, Pennsylvania

- Game time: 1:00 pm EST
- Game weather: 33 °F or 0.6 °C, wind 12 miles per hour (19 km/h; 10 kn)
- Game attendance: 51,854
- Referee: Tom Dooley
- TV announcers: (CBS) Vin Scully (play by play), Hank Stram (color commentator)

Scoring drives:

- Pittsburgh – Harris 1 run (Trout kick)
- Pittsburgh – Swann 9 pass from Bradshaw (Trout kick)
- Pittsburgh – Bradshaw 1 run (Trout kick)
- Pittsburgh – FG Trout 21

==== Week 14 (Monday, December 7, 1981): at Oakland Raiders ====
	1	2	3	4	Total
Steelers	7	7	6	7	**27**
**Raiders**	0	7	7	16	**30**

at Oakland–Alameda County Coliseum, Oakland, California

- Game time: 9:00 pm EST
- Game weather: 56 °F or 13.3 °C, wind 7 miles per hour (11 km/h; 6.1 kn)
- Game attendance: 51,769
- Referee: Jim Tunney
- TV announcers: (ABC) Frank Gifford (play by play), Don Meredith & Howard Cosell (color commentators)

Scoring drives:

- Pittsburgh – Cunningham 5 pass from Bradshaw (Trout kick)
- Oakland – Ramsey 25 pass from Wilson (Bahr kick)
- Pittsburgh – Smith 19 pass from Malone (Trout kick)
- Oakland – Whittington 17 pass from Wilson (Bahr kick)
- Pittsburgh – Malone 11 run (kick failed)
- Oakland – Chandler 36 pass from Wilson (kick failed)
- Oakland – Watts 53 punt return (Bahr kick)
- Oakland – FG Bahr 29
- Pittsburgh – Smith 17 pass from Malone (Trout kick)

==== Week 15 (Sunday, December 13, 1981): vs. Cincinnati Bengals ====
	1	2	3	4	Total
**Bengals**	0	10	7	0	**17**
Steelers	0	3	0	7	**10**

at Three Rivers Stadium, Pittsburgh, Pennsylvania

- Game time: 1:00 pm EST
- Game weather: 27 °F or −2.8 °C, wind 5 miles per hour (8.0 km/h; 4.3 kn)
- Game attendance: 50,623
- Referee: Red Cashion
- TV announcers: (NBC) Don Criqui (play by play), John Brodie (color commentator)

Scoring drives:

- Pittsburgh – FG Trout 48
- Cincinnati – FG Breech 38
- Cincinnati – Curtis 2 pass from Ken Anderson (Breech kick)
- Cincinnati – Kreider 22 pass from Ken Anderson (Breech kick)
- Pittsburgh – Harris 2 pass from Malone (Trout kick)

==== Week 16 (Sunday, December 20, 1981): at Houston Oilers ====
	1	2	3	4	Total
Steelers	3	3	14	0	**20**
**Oilers**	7	7	0	7	**21**

at Astrodome, Houston, Texas

- Game time: 4:00 pm EST
- Game weather: Dome
- Game attendance: 41,056
- Referee: Bob McElwee
- TV announcers: (NBC) Phil Stone (play by play), Gene Washington (color commentator)

Scoring drives:

- Pittsburgh – FG Trout 40
- Houston – Casper 15 pass from Nielsen (Fritsch kick)
- Houston – Casper 23 pass from Nielsen (Fritsch kick)
- Pittsburgh – FG Trout 37
- Pittsburgh – Thornton 17 run (Trout kick)
- Pittsburgh – Malone 2 run (Trout kick)
- Houston – Casper 16 pass from Nielsen (Fritsch kick)

=== Standings ===
AFC Central
	W	L	T	PCT	DIV	CONF	PF	PA	STK
^{(1)} Cincinnati Bengals	12	4	0	.750	4–2	10–2	421	304	W2
Pittsburgh Steelers	8	8	0	.500	3–3	5–7	356	297	L3
Houston Oilers	7	9	0	.438	4–2	6–6	281	355	W1
Cleveland Browns	5	11	0	.313	1–5	2–10	276	375	L5
