= 1978 Pittsburgh Steelers season =

Pittsburgh Steelers 46th US football season

- Owner: Art Rooney
- General manager: Dick Haley
- Head coach: Chuck Noll
- Home stadium: Three Rivers Stadium

Results
- Record: 14–2
- Division place: 1st AFC Central
- Playoffs: Won Divisional Playoffs (vs. Broncos) 33–10; Won AFC Championship (vs. Oilers) 34–5; Won Super Bowl XIII (vs. Cowboys) 35–31
- All-Pros: 5: Terry Bradshaw (1st team); Jack Ham (1st team); Lynn Swann (1st team); Mike Webster (1st team); Mel Blount (2nd team)
- Pro Bowlers: 10: CB Mel Blount; QB Terry Bradshaw; DT Joe Greene; DE L. C. Greenwood; LB Jack Ham; RB Franco Harris; LB Jack Lambert; S Donnie Shell; WR John Stallworth; C Mike Webster
- Team MVP: Terry Bradshaw

The 1978 Pittsburgh Steelers season was the franchise's 46th season in the National Football League (NFL). The season concluded with the team winning Super Bowl XIII to become the first franchise in the NFL to win three Super Bowl titles. The championship run was led by quarterback Terry Bradshaw and the team's vaunted Steel Curtain defense. This team is regarded as one of the greatest defensive teams of all time and one of the greatest teams in NFL history. Bradshaw put together the best year of his career to that point, becoming only the second Steeler to win the NFL MVP award. Ten Steelers players were named to the Pro Bowl team, and four were judged as first-team All-Pros by the AP. Head coach Chuck Noll returned for his tenth season—moving him ahead of Walt Kiesling as the longest tenured head coach in the team's history to that point.

The Steelers entered the season as defending champions of the AFC Central Division, coming off a 9–5 record in 1977. Their two losses were by a combined 10 points. Despite winning their division, the previous season was a difficult one for the team (both on and off the field) which culminated in a division round playoff loss to the Denver Broncos on Christmas Eve.

The team began the 1978 season with seven straight victories, a franchise-best start to a season that stood for 42 years, before losing to the Houston Oilers in prime time on Monday Night Football. They finished the season with a league-best 14–2 record, including a 5-game winning streak to close the season. This record assured them they would play at home throughout the 1978 playoffs. It was also the best record compiled in the team's history (since surpassed only by a 15–1 mark in 2004).

The 1978 Steelers team was rated the thirty-fifth best team in the history of the NFL (to September 2015) by FiveThirtyEight, a polling aggregation and statistical service. The rating is based upon FiveThirtyEight's proprietary Elo rating system algorithm. Only two Steelers teams were rated higher: the 1975 team at twelfth and the 2005 team one slot ahead of the 1978 team at thirty-fourth.

In 2007, the 1978 Steelers were ranked as the 3rd greatest Super Bowl champions on the NFL Network's documentary series America's Game: The Super Bowl Champions, with team commentary from Rocky Bleier, Mel Blount, Randy Grossman and Joe Greene, and narrated by Bruce Willis. They also were #3 on the 100 greatest teams of all time presented by the NFL on its 100th anniversary. For that, commentary was provided by actor Jon Hamm, radio personality Jon Hein, and players Tony Dungy, Franco Harris, Ed "Too Tall" Jones and Lynn Swann.

== Offseason ==
=== League rule changes ===
The NFL instituted several major changes for the 1978 season. Chief among these were the extension of the regular season and playoff expansion. The regular season was extended from 14 to 16 games, with an offsetting decrease in the number of preseason games from six to four. Two playoff slots were added expanding the field from eight teams to ten, with each conference adding a second wild card entrant.

Additionally, several rules were changed to help open up the offense, particularly the passing game. One rule which prohibited defenders from contacting receivers more than five yards from the line of scrimmage, came to be known as the "Mel Blount rule" after the Steelers notably physical cornerback. Another rule allowed offensive linemen to use their hands in blocking.

The rule changes upset coach Noll, who years later said of the teams who supported the changes,

They ganged up on us the way they legislated the rules. People were trying to win a championship through legislation. I don't think you do that. ... But whatever the rules are, you have to adjust to them and play with them. ... When they changed the rules Terry (Bradshaw) took advantage and his passing game blossomed. And all that happened to Mel (Blount) is that he got more interceptions.

In the end, though, the Steelers were one of the quickest teams to adjust to the new rules; the team's offense benefited more from the changes than the defense was hampered by them. The rule changes catalyzed the team's transition from a power running game to more of an air attack.

=== Coaching staff changes ===
The Steelers coaching staff went through a number of changes after the 1977 season. Principle among these was the loss of Chuck Noll's top assistant, Bud Carson, who had served as the team's defensive coordinator since 1973. Carson interviewed for the head coaching vacancy at his alma mater, the University of North Carolina., and was also a candidate for the St. Louis Cardinals top coaching job. When he didn't land either of those positions (the Tar Heels hired Dick Crum, and the Cardinals lured legendary Oklahoma Sooners coach Bud Wilkinson out of retirement after 14 seasons as an analyst for ABC college football broadcasts) he decided to take a job as the defensive backs coach of the Los Angeles Rams (Carson was hired by George Allen, who was fired after two exhibition games; defensive coordinator Ray Malavasi was named Allen's successor). Defensive line coach George Perles added the defensive coordinator role to his responsibility with the line.

Offensive line coach Dan Radakovich, who had served in that capacity with the Steelers since 1974, resigned to take a position as the defensive coordinator of the San Francisco 49ers. Radakovich was credited with turning the Pittsburgh Steelers line into one of the league's best. Rollie Dotsch was hired to replace Radakovich. Dotsch had recently been let go along with the rest of the Detroit Lions coaching staff. He had coached the Lions linebackers the previous season.

In the team's final coaching change of the offseason, Dick Walker was hired to coach the defensive backs. Walker had previously served in a similar role with the New England Patriots.

=== Roster moves ===
Several players who played significant roles in the Steelers recent success would not return for 1978. Among the departed were:

- defensive tackle Ernie Holmes (traded to the Tampa Bay Buccaneers for 10th and 11th round picks in the 1978 draft)
- guard Jim Clack (traded to the New York Giants along with wide receiver Ernie Pough in exchange for offensive lineman John Hicks)
- wide receiver Frank Lewis (traded to the Buffalo Bills for tight end Paul Seymour)
- running back Reggie Harrison (cut)
- safety Jimmy Allen (traded to the Detroit Lions for a fourth-round selection in the 1979 draft)
- safety Glen Edwards (traded to the San Diego Chargers for a 1979 6th rounder).

Several of these moves were made in the name of eliminating "distractions". Ernie Holmes, Jimmy Allen and Glen Edwards had all had contract disputes which saw them leave the team for brief periods during the previous season. Holmes, Edwards and Frank Lewis had all lost their starting jobs. None of the moves brought the Steelers a player who had a significant impact on the team in 1978.

The Frank Lewis trade was a complete flop for the Steelers. Paul Seymour failed his physical when the Steelers learned he'd had surgery on both arches within the past five months. His rehabilitation from the surgery was not complete and he was unable to run. Seymour was returned to the Bills who released him, and the two teams failed to work out any other compensation for Lewis. Lewis was the Steelers first round draft choice in 1971, but was unlikely to have made the Steelers roster anyway due to the ascendancy of John Stallworth opposite Lynn Swann and the training camp performance of the younger Jim Smith and Randy Reutershan. Lewis did have some football left in him; he made the 1982 Pro Bowl for the Bills.

The Jim Clack trade also netted the Steelers nothing when John Hicks was injured in the pre-season and placed on the injured reserve list. Meanwhile, both Clack and Ernie Pough made the Giant's 45-man roster, Clack as a starter on the offensive line, where he would be directly involved with that season's Miracle at the Meadowlands between the Giants and Philadelphia Eagles. Longtime Steelers beat writer Ed Bouchette called the Lewis and Clack trades Chuck Noll's "two worst trades in his 23 seasons with the Steelers."

In addition to the players traded away and cut, J. T. Thomas was lost for the season to a blood disorder known as Boeck's Sarcoidosis. Thomas had been the team's starting left cornerback (opposite Mel Blount) and his loss coupled with the Jimmy Allen trade left the team thin at the cornerback position.

Finally, longtime punter Bobby Walden retired, leaving Rocky Bleier as the last player on the roster who was with the team prior to the arrival of Noll in 1969. Walden, who had turned 40 in the offseason and was the team's oldest player, was replaced by Craig Colquitt, who like Walden would go on to a successful tenure with the team.

=== Draft ===
The 1978 NFL Draft was held on May 2–3, in the ballroom of the Roosevelt Hotel in New York City. The Steelers selected fourteen players. They also traded their selection in the fifth round (pick 128 overall) to the Green Bay Packers for defensive tackle Dave Pureifory (Pureifory was later traded during training camp to the New England Patriots for their sixth-round selection in the 1979 draft). Coming out of the draft it appeared that the team had addressed perceived needs at punter, defensive back, defensive line and running back.

1978 Pittsburgh Steelers draft
Round	Pick	Player	Position	College	Notes
1	22	Ron Johnson	Cornerback	Eastern Michigan	
2	49	Willie Fry	Defensive end	Notre Dame	
3	76	Craig Colquitt	Punter	Tennessee	
4	101	Larry Anderson	Cornerback	Louisiana Tech	
6	160	Randy Reutershan	Wide receiver	Pittsburgh	
7	187	Mark Dufresne	Tight end	Nebraska	
8	208	Rick Moser	Running back	Rhode Island	from St. Louis^{[a]}
8	214	Andre Keys	Wide receiver	Cal Poly	
9	241	Lance Reynolds	Offensive tackle	BYU	
10	268	Doug Becker	Linebacker	Notre Dame	
10	276	Tom Jurich	Kicker	Northern Arizona	from Tampa Bay^{[b]}
11	279	Nat Terry	Defensive back	Florida State	from Tampa Bay^{[b]}
11	300	Tom Brzoza	Center	Pittsburgh	
12	327	Brad Carr	Linebacker	Maryland	
Made roster

Notes:

^{a} pick from St. Louis Cardinals for Marv Kellum
^{b} pick from Tampa Bay Buccaneers for Ernie Holmes

=== Undrafted free agents ===
1978 undrafted free agents of note
Player	Position	College
Fred Anderson	Defensive End	Prairie View A&M
Roscoe Coles	Running back	Virginia Tech
Annise Davis	Running back	Missouri
Dave Gillespie	Running back	Nebraska
Larry McCartney	Center	Louisiana Tech
Jack Phelan	Defensive back	Saint Francis
Jimmy Randolph	Cornerback	UT Martin
Mike Rhodes	Wide receiver	Miami (OH)
Wayne Schwalbach	Tight end/Punter	Central Michigan
Ron Scott	Running back	North Carolina A&T
Clay Singletary	Center	West Virginia
Gary Sitler	Punter	Wittenberg
Robert Thompson	Cornerback	Georgia
Bradley Wagner	Defensive back	Kansas State

=== "Shouldergate" ===
The 1978 season began with some controversy, when players were caught wearing shoulder pads in off-season drills in violation of league rules. The infraction occurred during a late May rookie camp and was uncovered and reported by Pittsburgh Press reporter John Clayton.

"That story had no news value whatsoever. The thing that made it very bad was that the story was of no news to the people of Pittsburgh. So I have to assume that he [referring to John Clayton] is working for the competition. He certainly wasn't working in the interest of the paper or the fans. As far as I'm concerned he was working for the other people. The only way I can read it is espionage. I know for a fact that other people use other media for their interests, to spy."

— Head coach Chuck Noll's reaction to the "Shouldergate" story.

Clayton was not the paper's regular Steelers beat writer at the time, but was just filling in that day. While the practice in which the violation occurred was closed to the media by head coach Chuck Noll, Clayton uncovered the story in interviews with players whom he found wearing pads in the locker room. Clayton contacted the league office for clarification on the rule, which stated that teams must have "no contact work or use of pads (except helmets) in an off-season training camp."

The story caused an uproar among the team's local fanbase, with most of the vitriol directed at Clayton for reporting the story, rather than at Noll and the team for breaking the rule. This sentiment was stoked by Noll's angry reaction to the story, in which he referred to the reporting as "espionage." Even some members of the local media spoke of Clayton as a traitor to the Steeler cause.

The precedent for punishment of such a rule violation was set by an earlier incident for which the Green Bay Packers were stripped of a fourth-round draft pick. The Packers were able to argue at that time that they were unaware of the rule they broke. The Steelers had no such defense, since the team's president, Dan Rooney, was instrumental in negotiations to get the "no pads" rule included in the collective bargaining agreement with the league's players.

NFL commissioner Pete Rozelle eventually stripped the Steelers of their third-round selection in the 1979 draft for the transgression.

=== Training camp ===
After putting the distractions of the 1977 season and Shouldergate behind them, the Steelers had a very productive training camp in 1978. All-Pro defensive end Joe Greene noted the renewed focus, saying

The biggest difference in this camp compared to last year is that this camp is about football, not gossip. Everything that's happening in this camp is about football. That's not saying we’re going to go out there and kick butts, but that's saying we’re going to be going about our business, what we’re being paid for.

== Personnel ==
=== Staff ===
1978 Pittsburgh Steelers staff
Front office: Chairman of the board – Arthur J. Rooney; President – Daniel M. Rooney; Vice president – John R. McGinley; Vice president – Arthur J. Rooney, Jr.; Public relations director – Ed Kiely; Traveling secretary – James A. Boston; Publicity director – Joe Gordon; Controller – Dennis P. Thimons; Assistant controller – James S. Maund; Director of ticket sales – Geraldine Glenn; Director of player personnel – Dick Haley; Assistant director of player personnel – Bill Nunn; Director of professional scouting – V. Timothy Rooney; Talent scout – West Coast – Bob Schmitz; Head coaches: Head coach – Chuck Noll; Offensive coaches: Offensive line – Rollie Dotsch; Offensive backfield – Dick Hoak; Receivers – Tom Moore	Defensive coaches: Defensive coordinator – George Perles; Defensive assistant – Dick Walker; Linebackers & Secondary – Woody Widenhofer; Strength and conditioning: Strength – Louis Riecke; Flexibility – Paul Uram; Physician, M.D. – Dr. David S. Huber; Physician, M.D. – Dr. Anthony P. Yates; Physician, orthopedic – Dr. Paul B. Steele, Jr.; Dentist – Dr. George P. Boucek; Trainer – Ralph Berlin; Assistant trainer – Robert Milie; Equipment manager – Anthony Parisi; Field manager – Jack Hart; Film director – Bob McCartney; Photographer – Harry Homa

== Roster ==
1978 Pittsburgh Steelers roster
Quarterbacks (QB): 12 Terry Bradshaw; 15 Mike Kruczek; 18 Cliff Stoudt; Running backs (RB): 20 Rocky Bleier; 35 Jack Deloplaine; 32 Franco Harris; 39 Rick Moser; 38 Sidney Thornton; Wide receivers (WR): 83 Theo Bell; 86 Jim Smith; 82 John Stallworth; 88 Lynn Swann; Tight ends (TE): 89 Bennie Cunningham; 84 Randy Grossman; 87 Jim Mandich	Offensive linemen (OL): 79 Larry Brown T; 77 Steve Courson G; 57 Sam Davis G; 55 Jon Kolb T; 72 Gerry Mullins G; 66 Ted Petersen C; 74 Ray Pinney T; 52 Mike Webster C; Defensive linemen (DL): 69 Fred Anderson DE; 76 John Banaszak DE/DT; 65 Tom Beasley DT/DE; 67 Gary Dunn DT; 64 Steve Furness DT; 75 Joe Greene DT; 68 L. C. Greenwood DE; 78 Dwight White DE	Linebackers (LB): 56 Robin Cole OLB; 59 Jack Ham OLB; 58 Jack Lambert MLB; 51 Loren Toews OLB; 53 Dennis Winston MLB; Defensive backs (DB): 30 Larry Anderson CB; 47 Mel Blount CB; 21 Tony Dungy FS; 29 Ron Johnson CB; 25 Ray Oldham SS; 31 Donnie Shell SS; 23 Mike Wagner FS; Special teams (ST): 5 Craig Colquitt P; 10 Roy Gerela K	Reserve: 63 Thom Dornbrook C/G (IR); 62 Willie Fry DE/DT (IR); -- Andre Keys WR (IR); 40 Randy Reutershan KR (IR); 24 J. T. Thomas CB (IR); Rookies in italics 45 active, 5 reserve

== Preseason ==
Week	Date	Opponent	Result	Record	Venue	Recap
1	August 5	at Baltimore Colts	W 22–10	1–0	Memorial Stadium	
2	August 12	Atlanta Falcons	W 13–7	2–0	Three Rivers Stadium	
3	August 19	at New York Giants	L 6–13	2–1	Giants Stadium	
4	August 26	at Dallas Cowboys	L 13–16	2–2	Texas Stadium	

The Steelers exhibition schedule did not start off smoothly, despite coming away with a 22–10 victory against the Baltimore Colts. Starting quarterback Terry Bradshaw suffered a broken nose on a scramble in the first quarter of the game. In addition, the kicking game was unimpressive and the team committed a considerable number of penalties including three personal fouls.

The second pre-season game against the Atlanta Falcons was the Steelers' lone home exhibition contest. The defense led the way, as they had so many times in the team's back-to-back championship seasons in 1974 and 1975. The defensive strength was illustrated in the first quarter when a blocked punt gave the Falcons the ball on the Steelers three-yard line. After failing to gain yardage on two running plays, the Falcons' third-down pass was intercepted by Donnie Shell (one of five Steelers interceptions on the evening). The Falcons' offense was held scoreless, their only points in the 13–7 loss came off a fumble recovery.

The next game, against the New York Giants, was a completely different story. The game seemed to be over almost before it started when the Giants scored on a 78-yard touchdown pass in just the second play of the evening. The Giants went on to control the game en route to a 13–6 victory over the listless and mistake-prone Steelers. Coach Noll said of the opening score, "We didn't recover, and that's not a good sign. They outdid us all down the line. They hit harder."

In the fourth and final pre-season game, the Steelers' defense once again played well, but the offense was the weak link in a 16–13 loss to the Dallas Cowboys (in what would turn out to be a preview of the Super Bowl XIII matchup). The Steelers had difficulty running the ball, with six players combining for just 101 yards on 29 rushing attempts. Despite the offensive sluggishness, the Steelers led 13–3 after three quarters. Unfortunately, the defense was worn out (they faced a staggering 82 plays in the game) and they gave up two touchdown passes to Roger Staubach in the fourth quarter. The lack of offensive rhythm led Terry Bradshaw to comment, "I feel terrible. I'm concerned. It's easy to say that it'll come. But I don't want to go into the Buffalo game worried about the offense. ... If you looked at this, you'd have to say we have a lot of work to do."

At the end of the preseason, the Steelers were listed by oddsmakers at Harrah's casino in Las Vegas as 5–1 to win the American Football Conference (AFC). The favorites were the Oakland Raiders at 7–5, followed by the New England Patriots at 3–1 and then the Steelers and Baltimore Colts at 5–1.

== Regular season ==
=== Schedule ===
Week	Date	Opponent	Result	Record	Venue	Recap
1	September 3	at Buffalo Bills	W 28–17	1–0	Rich Stadium	Recap
2	September 10	Seattle Seahawks	W 21–10	2–0	Three Rivers Stadium	Recap
3	September 17	at Cincinnati Bengals	W 28–3	3–0	Riverfront Stadium	Recap
4	September 24	Cleveland Browns	W 15–9 (OT)	4–0	Three Rivers Stadium	Recap
5	October 1	at New York Jets	W 28–17	5–0	Shea Stadium	Recap
6	October 8	Atlanta Falcons	W 31–7	6–0	Three Rivers Stadium	Recap
7	October 15	at Cleveland Browns	W 34–14	7–0	Cleveland Municipal Stadium	Recap
8	October 23	Houston Oilers	L 17–24	7–1	Three Rivers Stadium	Recap
9	October 29	Kansas City Chiefs	W 27–24	8–1	Three Rivers Stadium	Recap
10	November 5	New Orleans Saints	W 20–14	9–1	Three Rivers Stadium	Recap
11	November 12	at Los Angeles Rams	L 7–10	9–2	L.A. Memorial Coliseum	Recap
12	November 19	Cincinnati Bengals	W 7–6	10–2	Three Rivers Stadium	Recap
13	November 27	at San Francisco 49ers	W 24–7	11–2	Candlestick Park	Recap
14	December 3	at Houston Oilers	W 13–3	12–2	Astrodome	Recap
15	December 9	Baltimore Colts	W 35–13	13–2	Three Rivers Stadium	Recap
16	December 16	at Denver Broncos	W 21–17	14–2	Mile High Stadium	Recap

=== Standings ===
AFC Central
	W	L	T	PCT	DIV	CONF	PF	PA	STK
^{(1)} Pittsburgh Steelers	14	2	0	.875	5–1	11–1	356	195	W5
^{(5)} Houston Oilers	10	6	0	.625	4–2	8–4	283	298	L1
Cleveland Browns	8	8	0	.500	1–5	4–8	334	356	L1
Cincinnati Bengals	4	12	0	.250	2–4	2–10	252	284	W3

=== Game summaries ===
==== Week 1: at Buffalo Bills ====
Week One: Pittsburgh Steelers (0–0) at Buffalo Bills (0–0) – Game information
- Sunday, September 3 at 1:00 pm (EDT)
- Game weather: Cool, 67 °F (19 °C)
- Referee: Fred Silva
- Point spread: Steelers by 10½
- Game attendance: 64,147 at Rich Stadium in Orchard Park, New York
- TV announcers: (NBC) Jay Randolph (play by play), Mike Haffner (color commentator)
- Game coverage: Pro Football Reference, Pittsburgh Post-Gazette recap

	1	2	3	4	Total
Steelers	0	14	0	14	28
Bills	0	0	0	17	17

The Steelers came into the season opener as heavy favorites over the Buffalo Bills, who were 2–12 in 1976 and 3–11 in 1977. The Steel Curtain defense was dominant early, holding the Bills to just 59 total yards and only six first downs in first three quarters of play. New defensive coordinator George Perles employed the blitz to a much greater degree than the team had in the past. Bills quarterback Joe Ferguson, who was coming off a knee injury suffered in the exhibition season, struggled with just three completions and 20 yards on ten passing attempts before being pulled from the game.

Meanwhile, the Steelers scored two second-quarter touchdowns, the first coming on a throw from Terry Bradshaw to John Stallworth. Stallworth caught three passes of twenty yards or longer in the Steelers first two possessions. The Steelers second score came on a one-yard plunge by Franco Harris. When the Steelers scored again on a Sidney Thornton rush at the start of the fourth quarter to go up 21–0, the game appeared to be all but over.

However, Seahawks castoff Bill Munson came into the game in relief of Ferguson and sparked the Bills, playing their first game under new coach Chuck Knox, to two quick scores that brought the Bills to within 11 points. The Steelers put the game away with a 73-yard drive capped by Bradshaw's second touchdown of the game.

Scoring drives and statistics:

First quarter

- No scoring plays

Second quarter

- Pittsburgh – John Stallworth 28 yard pass from Terry Bradshaw (Roy Gerela kick)
- Pittsburgh – Franco Harris 1 yard run (Gerela kick)

Third quarter

- No scoring plays

Fourth quarter

- Pittsburgh – Sidney Thornton 2 yard run (Gerela kick)
- Buffalo – Frank Lewis 22 yard pass from Bill Munson (Tom Dempsey kick)
- Buffalo – Dempsey 32 yard field goal
- Pittsburgh – Theo Bell 15 yard pass from Bradshaw (Gerela kick)
- Buffalo – Reuben Gant 3 yard pass from Munson (Dempsey kick)

Steelers	Game statistics	Bills
21	First downs	16
43–142	Rushes–yards	29–100
217	Passing yards	164
14–19–1	Passes	13–26–1
39	Return yards	−10
4–39	Punts	6–43
0–0	Fumbles–lost	0–0
5–54	Penalties–yards	9–62

==== Week 2: vs. Seattle Seahawks ====
Week Two: Seattle Seahawks (0–1) at Pittsburgh Steelers (1–0) – Game information
- Sunday, September 10 at 1:00 pm (EDT)
- Game weather: Sunny, 81 °F (27 °C)
- Referee: Jim Tunney
- Point spread: Steelers by 13½
- Game attendance: 48,277 at Three Rivers Stadium in Pittsburgh, Pennsylvania
- TV announcers: (NBC) Sam Nover (play by play), Mike Haffner (color commentator)
- Game coverage: Pro Football Reference, Pittsburgh Post-Gazette recap

	1	2	3	4	Total
Seahawks	0	7	3	0	10
Steelers	0	14	0	7	21

This game marked the second ever meeting between the Steelers and the Seattle Seahawks, who were playing in just their third NFL season. The Seahawks entered the game hoping to stop the Steelers running game – while that effort was largely successful the Steelers and quarterback Terry Bradshaw won with the passing game. After a scoreless first quarter, the Steelers took a 14–0 lead which they wouldn't relinquish on a pair of Bradshaw touchdown passes. Linebacker Jack Lambert led the Steelers defense with an interception, a fumble recovery and five solo tackles.

The first quarter saw Bradshaw injure his throwing hand when he jammed his index finger on a helmet. However, he played through the soreness and threw the two second-quarter scoring passes to Lynn Swann and Sidney Thornton. The Seahawks scored on a David Sims rushing touchdown to stay within one score at halftime. The Seahawks caught the Steelers off guard with a successful onside kick following the Sims score, however the subsequent drive ended in a missed field goal. In the third quarter, the Seahawks narrowed the lead to just four points off an Effren Herrera field goal.

At the start of the fourth quarter Franco Harris, who was hampered in the game by a bruised thigh, was stopped less than a yard short of the goal line on a third down play. Coach Chuck Noll initially sent the field-goal team on, but after a timeout he reconsidered and sent the offense back out. Harris ran behind the right guard and pushed the ball across the plane of the goalline before being pushed back. The play was ruled a touchdown, though the Seahawks disputed the call.

The win gave the Steelers a 2–0 record – a mark they had achieved only once since 1956.

Scoring drives and statistics:

First quarter

- No scoring plays

Second quarter

- Pittsburgh – Lynn Swann 4 yard pass from Terry Bradshaw (Roy Gerela kick)
- Pittsburgh – Sidney Thornton 20 yard pass from Bradshaw (Gerela kick)
- Seattle – David Sims 1 yard run (Effren Herrera kick)

Third quarter

- Seattle – Herrera 20 yard field goal

Fourth quarter

- Pittsburgh – Franco Harris 1 yard run (Gerela kick)

Steelers	Game statistics	Seahawks
26	First downs	18
40–151	Rushes–yards	28–93
185	Passing yards	154
17–33–0	Passes	11–22–1
44	Return yards	47
3–42	Punts	4–38
2–1	Fumbles–lost	2–2
8–65	Penalties–yards	7–52

==== Week 3: at Cincinnati Bengals ====
Week Three: Pittsburgh Steelers (2–0) at Cincinnati Bengals (0–2) – Game information
- Sunday, September 17 at 1:00 pm (EDT)
- Game weather: Cloudy, 76 °F (24 °C)
- Referee: Dick Jorgensen
- Point spread: Steelers by 4½
- Game attendance: 50,260 at Riverfront Stadium in Cincinnati, Ohio
- TV announcers: (NBC) Curt Gowdy (play by play), John Brodie (color commentator)
- Game coverage: Pro Football Reference, Pittsburgh Post-Gazette recap

	1	2	3	4	Total
Steelers	14	7	7	0	28
Bengals	0	3	0	0	3

The Steelers entered the third week 2–0 and favored to win, though one sportswriter called the Steelers "convincing but not overpowering", and noted that they had not beaten the point spread in either of their first two games.

The Bengals came into the game without their starting quarterback, Ken Anderson who was nursing a broken finger. Steelers running back Franco Harris busted through the Bengals 3–4 defense for a 37-yard gain on the game's first offensive play. Five plays later, Rocky Bleier scored on a 5-yard run and the Steelers never looked back. The Steelers didn't punt for the first time until the end of the third quarter and they dominated statistically. Center Mike Webster noted, "From the first play on, everything worked."

The Steelers players were beginning to feel that the team might be once again approaching the level of the Super Bowl teams. Bleier said after the game, "At some point, I don't know when, people are going to start saying, 'Hey, it's the Steelers again.'" When asked about his performance through the first three games, Bradshaw admitted he was playing the best football of his life, saying, "Yes and I don't know why, but I don't even want to find out. Whatever it is, maybe, it'll last all year. Maybe it will be one of those dream years people have been wantin' me to have." Linebacker Jack Lambert stated, "We're playing well and we've got a good attitude. Last year was no good. This is good."

Coach Noll tried to tamp down expectations, saying "We're happy to be there. We'll take any kind of crumbs we can get." But even he had to admit that, "It was a good day for us." He added, "Our football team is functioning with a pretty good concept of what it's all about, what it takes. Things aren't out of perspective at all."

The 28–3 final was the Steelers largest ever margin over the Bengals, eclipsing the 27–3 win from 1974. The 3–0 start to the season was only the third in the franchise's history and they stood tied atop the AFC Central division with the Cleveland Browns.

Scoring drives and statistics:

First quarter

- Pittsburgh – Rocky Bleier 5 yard run (Roy Gerela kick)
- Pittsburgh – Franco Harris 15 yard run (Gerela kick)

Second quarter

- Cincinnati – Chris Bahr 33 yard field goal
- Pittsburgh – Bennie Cunningham 26 yard pass from Terry Bradshaw (Gerela kick)

Third quarter

- Pittsburgh – Lynn Swann 12 yard pass from Bradshaw (Gerela kick)

Fourth quarter

- No scoring plays

Steelers	Game statistics	Bengals
26	First downs	9
49–212	Rushes–yards	19–56
242	Passing yards	123
14–20–1	Passes	17–37–2
145	Return yards	114
4–43.7	Punts	10–42.4
3–3	Fumbles–lost	1–0
6–46	Penalties–yards	7–99

==== Week 4: vs. Cleveland Browns ====
Week Four: Cleveland Browns (3–0) at Pittsburgh Steelers (3–0) – Game information
- Sunday, September 24 at 1:00 pm (EDT)
- Game weather: Cloudy, 66 °F (19 °C)
- Referee: Fred Wyant
- Point spread: Steelers by 8
- Game attendance: 49,513 at Three Rivers Stadium in Pittsburgh, Pennsylvania
- TV announcers: (NBC) Dick Enberg (play by play), Merlin Olsen (color commentator)
- Game coverage: Pro Football Reference, Pittsburgh Post-Gazette recap

	1	2	3	4	OT	Total
Browns	0	6	3	0	0	9
Steelers	3	0	0	6	6	15

The Steelers and Browns came into their week four matchup tied atop the AFC Central standings, but Cleveland was without their four-time Pro Bowl running back Greg Pruitt who had been hospitalized by a leg contusion. The Browns had never previously won in the two teams' eight previous meetings in Three Rivers Stadium. Coach Noll predicted, however, that the Browns would remain competitive without Pruitt, going so far as to say that the game "is their Super Bowl."

The Browns contained the Steelers offense all game, and after four quarters the game was tied at 9 with neither team managing to score a touchdown in regulation. The Browns had two apparent scores nullified by penalty: a 61-yard touchdown pass in the first quarter was called back when it was ruled that Browns quarterback Brian Sipe had crossed the line of scrimmage prior to releasing the ball and later a 17-yard pass was nullified by a holding penalty. A Hail Mary attempt by the Browns on the final play of the fourth quarter was intercepted by Steelers defensive back Tony Dungy.

The Steelers won the overtime coin toss and chose to receive the kickoff. On the kickoff, Steelers returner Larry Anderson lost the ball as he was being tackled. While the Browns felt that Anderson had fumbled (and replays later showed that it probably was a fumble), the officials ruled that Anderson was down and the play had been whistled dead before he lost the ball. Steelers retained possession at their 21-yard line. A few plays later, the Steelers were forced into a fourth down situation just over mid-field with 1 yard to go. Coach Noll chose to go for the conversion, which was gained by a short Franco Harris run. When asked about the decision Noll said, "It wasn't that much of a gamble, especially when the players had such a strong conviction of going for it – when you want something you try that much harder to attain your goal."

A few plays after the fourth-down conversion, a Steelers trick play turned out to be the game's final decisive play. On the play, Terry Bradshaw handed off to running back Rocky Bleier who gave the ball to wide receiver Lynn Swann on an apparent reverse. Swann, however, pitched the ball back to quarterback Terry Bradshaw who completed a 37-yard pass to tight end Bennie Cunningham for the decisive touchdown. Coach Noll revealed after the game that the flea flicker was actually a part of the team's specific game-plan for the Browns saying, "It was called high school right. We resurrected it this week and worked on it Wednesday and Thursday in practice."

Scoring drives and statistics:

First quarter

- Pittsburgh – Roy Gerela 19 yard field goal

Second quarter

- Cleveland – Don Cockroft 43 yard field goal
- Cleveland – Cockroft 30 yard field goal

Third quarter

- Cleveland – Cockroft 41 yard field goal

Fourth quarter

- Pittsburgh – Gerela 33 yard field goal
- Pittsburgh – Gerela 36 yard field goal

Overtime

- Pittsburgh – Bennie Cunningham 37 yard pass from Terry Bradshaw (no kick)

Steelers	Game statistics	Browns
18	First downs	19
37–139	Rushes–yards	32–97
200	Passing yards	102
14–32–2	Passes	14–32–2
100	Return yards	33
6–36	Punts	6–42
1–1	Fumbles–lost	1–0
11–119	Penalties–yards	8–68

==== Week 5: at New York Jets ====
Week Five: Pittsburgh Steelers (4–0) at New York Jets (2–2) – Game information
- Sunday, October 1 at 1:00 pm (EDT)
- Game weather: Sunny, 66 °F (19 °C)
- Referee: Bob Frederic
- Point spread: Steelers by 12½
- Game attendance: 52,058 at Shea Stadium in Flushing, New York
- TV announcers: (NBC) Sam Nover (play by play), Bob Trumpy (color commentator)
- Game coverage: Pro Football Reference, Pittsburgh Post-Gazette recap

	1	2	3	4	Total
Steelers	7	7	14	0	28
Jets	0	10	7	0	17

The win brought the Steelers to 5–0 which was the best start to a season in the franchise's history.

Scoring drives and statistics:

First quarter

- Pittsburgh – Lynn Swann 10 yard pass from Terry Bradshaw (Roy Gerela kick)

Second quarter

- New York Jets – Bruce Harper 11 yard run (Pat Leahy kick)
- Pittsburgh – John Stallworth 14 yard pass from Bradshaw (Gerela kick)
- New York Jets – Leahy 47 yard field goal

Third quarter

- Pittsburgh – Swann 26 yard pass from Bradshaw (Gerela kick)
- Pittsburgh – Sidney Thornton 1 yard run (Gerela kick)
- New York Jets – Kevin Long 2 yard run (Leahy kick)

Fourth quarter

- No scoring plays

Steelers	Game statistics	Jets
20	First downs	18
39–138	Rushes–yards	35–155
189	Passing yards	142
17–26–1	Passes	9–24–1
68	Return yards	0
2–43	Punts	4–42
1–1	Fumbles–lost	0–0
2–7	Penalties–yards	4–17

==== Week 6: vs. Atlanta Falcons ====
Week Six: Atlanta Falcons (2–3) at Pittsburgh Steelers (5–0) – Game information
- Sunday, October 8 at 1:00 pm (EDT)
- Game weather: Cloudy, 45 °F (7 °C)
- Referee: Don Wedge
- Point spread: Steelers by 9
- Game attendance: 48,202 at Three Rivers Stadium in Pittsburgh, Pennsylvania
- TV announcers: (CBS) Bob Costas (play by play), Tom Matte (color commentator)
- Game coverage: Pro Football Reference, Pittsburgh Post-Gazette recap

	1	2	3	4	Total
Falcons	0	0	0	7	7
Steelers	3	14	7	7	31

Scoring drives and statistics:

First quarter

- Pittsburgh – Roy Gerela 21 yard field goal

Second quarter

- Pittsburgh – Rocky Bleier 8 yard run (Gerela kick)
- Pittsburgh – Terry Bradshaw 6 yard run (Gerela kick)

Third quarter

- Pittsburgh – Bleier 2 yard run (Gerela kick)
- Pittsburgh – John Stallworth 11 yard pass from Bradshaw (Gerela kick)

Fourth quarter

- Atlanta – Wallace Francis 11 yard pass from Steve Bartkowski (Fred Steinfort kick)

Steelers	Game statistics	Falcons
28	First downs	20
44–181	Rushes–yards	34–113
206	Passing yards	144
13–18–0	Passes	17–33–2
15	Return yards	24
2–35	Punts	3–34
4–3	Fumbles–lost	3–2
8–74	Penalties–yards	4–38

==== Week 7: at Cleveland Browns ====
Week Seven: Pittsburgh Steelers (6–0) at Cleveland Browns (4–2) – Game information
- Sunday, October 15 at 1:00 pm (EDT)
- Game weather: Sunny, 47 °F (8 °C)
- Referee: Pat Haggerty
- Point spread: Steelers by 4
- Game attendance: 81,302 at Cleveland Municipal Stadium in Cleveland, Ohio
- TV announcers: (NBC) Dick Enberg (play by play), Merlin Olsen (color commentator)
- Game coverage: Pro Football Reference, Pittsburgh Post-Gazette recap

	1	2	3	4	Total
Steelers	6	7	14	7	34
Browns	0	7	0	7	14

Scoring drives and statistics:

First quarter

- Pittsburgh – Roy Gerela 23 yard field goal
- Pittsburgh – Gerela 44 yard field goal

Second quarter

- Cleveland – Dave Logan 17 ard pass from Brian Sipe (Don Cockroft kick)
- Pittsburgh – Larry Anderson 95 yard kickoff return (Gerela kick)

Third quarter

- Pittsburgh – Lynn Swann 28 yard pass from Terry Bradshaw (Gerela kick)
- Pittsburgh – Rocky Bleier 1 yard run (Gerela kick)

Fourth quarter

- Cleveland – Reggie Rucker 18 yard pass from Sipe (Cockroft kick)
- Pittsburgh – John Stallworth 32 yard pass from Bradshaw (Gerela kick)

Steelers	Game statistics	Browns
20	First downs	19
38–168	Rushes–yards	38–132
153	Passing yards	228
10–21–0	Passes	19–35–1
181	Return yards	163
5–40	Punts	4–31
4–0	Fumbles–lost	4–2
6–41	Penalties–yards	10–90

==== Week 8: vs. Houston Oilers ====
Week Eight: Houston Oilers (4–3) at Pittsburgh Steelers (7–0) – Game information
- Monday, October 23 at 9:00 pm (EDT)
- Game weather: Cloudy, 43 °F (6 °C)
- Referee: Ben Dreith
- Point spread: Steelers by 7½
- Game attendance: 48,021 at Three Rivers Stadium in Pittsburgh, Pennsylvania
- TV announcers: (ABC) Frank Gifford (play by play), Howard Cosell (color commentator)
- Game coverage: Pro Football Reference, Pittsburgh Post-Gazette recap

	1	2	3	4	Total
Oilers	0	10	7	7	24
Steelers	0	10	0	7	17

Scoring drives and statistics:

First quarter

- No scoring plays

Second quarter

- Houston – Earl Campbell 1 yard run (Toni Fritsch kick)
- Pittsburgh – Lynn Swann 25 yard pass from Terry Bradshaw (Gerela kick)
- Pittsburgh – Gerela 30 yard field goal
- Houston – Fritsch 39 yard field goal

Third quarter

- Houston – Campbell 3 yard run (Fritsch kick)

Fourth quarter

- Houston – Campbell 1 yard run (Fritsch kick)
- Pittsburgh – Swann 6 yard pass from Bradshaw (Gerela kick)

Steelers	Game statistics	Oilers
21	First downs	22
31–113	Rushes–yards	43–169
215	Passing yards	160
17–33–1	Passes	13–19–0
120	Return yards	65
3–41	Punts	4–41
2–0	Fumbles–lost	2–1
7–53	Penalties–yards	6–51

==== Week 9: vs. Kansas City Chiefs ====
Week Nine: Kansas City Chiefs (2–6) at Pittsburgh Steelers (7–1) – Game information
- Sunday, October 29 at 1:00 pm (EST)
- Game weather: Sunny, 55 °F (13 °C)
- Referee: Red Cashion
- Point spread: Steelers by 14
- Game attendance: 48,185 at Three Rivers Stadium in Pittsburgh, Pennsylvania
- TV announcers: (NBC) Jay Randolph (play by play), Paul Maguire (color commentator)
- Game coverage: Pro Football Reference, Pittsburgh Post-Gazette recap

	1	2	3	4	Total
Chiefs	3	0	14	7	24
Steelers	7	13	7	0	27

Scoring drives and statistics:

First quarter

- Kansas City – Jan Stenerud 25 yard field goal
- Pittsburgh – Franco Harris 1 yard run (Roy Gerela kick)

Second quarter

- Pittsburgh – Harris 11 yard run (Gerela kick)
- Pittsburgh – John Stallworth 1 yard run (kick failed)

Third quarter

- Kansas City – Ted McKnight 14 yard run (Stenerud kick)
- Kansas City – Tony Reed 16 yard run (Stenerud kick)
- Pittsburgh – Donnie Shell 17 yard fumble recovery return (Gerela kick)

Fourth quarter

- Kansas City – Arnold Morgado 2 yard run (Stenerud kick)

Steelers	Game statistics	Chiefs
17	First downs	20
40–135	Rushes–yards	38–186
141	Passing yards	80
8–15–2	Passes	15–28–2
89	Return yards	117
4–43.3	Punts	4–38.8
1–1	Fumbles–lost	2–1
10–79	Penalties–yards	10–100

==== Week 10: vs. New Orleans Saints ====
Week Ten: New Orleans Saints (5–4) at Pittsburgh Steelers (8–1) – Game information
- Sunday, November 5 at 1:00 pm (EST)
- Game weather: Sunny, 69 °F (21 °C)
- Referee: Jerry Markbreit
- Point spread: Steelers by 10½
- Game attendance: 48,526 at Three Rivers Stadium in Pittsburgh, Pennsylvania
- TV announcers: (CBS) Don Criqui (play by play), Hank Stram (color commentator)
- Game coverage: Pro Football Reference, Pittsburgh Post-Gazette recap

	1	2	3	4	Total
Saints	0	7	0	7	14
Steelers	3	0	10	7	20

Scoring drives and statistics:

First quarter

- Pittsburgh – Roy Gerela 27 yard field goal

Second quarter

- New Orleans – Rich Mauti 5 yard pass from Archie Manning (Steve Mike-Mayer kick)

Third quarter

- Pittsburgh – Lynn Swann 6 yard pass from Terry Bradshaw (Gerela kick)
- Pittsburgh – Gerela 21 yard field goal

Fourth quarter

- New Orleans – Tony Galbreath 5 yard run (Mike-Mayer kick)
- Pittsburgh – Rocky Bleier 6 yard pass from Bradshaw (Gerela kick)

Steelers	Game statistics	Saints
23	First downs	20
34–145	Rushes–yards	32–81
200	Passing yards	344
16–23–1	Passes	22–32–1
115	Return yards	62
1–28	Punts	2–60
2–1	Fumbles–lost	1–1
7–48	Penalties–yards	7–75

==== Week 11: at Los Angeles Rams ====
Week Eleven: Pittsburgh Steelers (9–1) at Los Angeles Rams (8–2) – Game information
- Sunday, November 12 at 9:00 pm (EST)
- Game weather: Cool, 49 °F (9 °C)
- Referee: Fred Silva
- Point spread: Rams by 2½
- Game attendance: 63,089 at L.A. Memorial Coliseum in Los Angeles
- TV announcers: (ABC) Frank Gifford (play by play), Howard Cosell (color commentator)
- Game coverage: Pro Football Reference, Pittsburgh Post-Gazette recap

	1	2	3	4	Total
Steelers	0	0	7	0	7
Rams	0	0	3	7	10

Scoring drives and statistics:

First quarter

- No scoring plays

Second quarter

- No scoring plays

Third quarter

- Pittsburgh – Lynn Swann 14 yard pass from Terry Bradshaw (Roy Gerela kick)
- Los Angeles – Frank Corral 37 yard field goal

Fourth quarter

- Los Angeles – Willie Miller 10 yard pass from Pat Haden (Corral kick)

Steelers	Game statistics	Rams
12	First downs	14
25–59	Rushes–yards	44–192
115	Passing yards	121
11–25–3	Passes	14–27–0
13	Return yards	83
7–41	Punts	7–27
2–0	Fumbles–lost	3–2
5–48	Penalties–yards	9–115

==== Week 12: vs. Cincinnati Bengals ====
Week Twelve: Cincinnati Bengals (1–10) at Pittsburgh Steelers (9–2) – Game information
- Sunday, November 19 at 4:00 pm (EST)
- Game weather: Cloudy, 44 °F (7 °C)
- Referee: Bob Frederic
- Point spread: Steelers by 11
- Game attendance: 47,578 at Three Rivers Stadium in Pittsburgh, Pennsylvania
- TV announcers: (NBC) Dick Enberg (play by play), Merlin Olsen (color commentator)
- Game coverage: Pro Football Reference, Pittsburgh Post-Gazette recap

	1	2	3	4	Total
Bengals	3	3	0	0	6
Steelers	0	7	0	0	7

Scoring drives and statistics:

First quarter

- Cincinnati – Chris Bahr 29 yard field goal

Second quarter

- Pittsburgh – Rocky Bleier 1 yard run (Roy Gerela kick)
- Cincinnati – Bahr 48 yard field goal

Third quarter

- No scoring plays

Fourth quarter

- No scoring plays

Steelers	Game statistics	Bengals
14	First downs	15
34–70	Rushes–yards	31–97
84	Passing yards	142
12–30–4	Passes	14–29–2
29	Return yards	41
7–37	Punts	6–34
4–1	Fumbles–lost	4–3
2–34	Penalties–yards	5–44

==== Week 13: at San Francisco 49ers ====
Week Thirteen: Pittsburgh Steelers (10–2) at San Francisco 49ers (1–11) – Game information
- Monday, November 27 at 9:00 pm (EST)
- Game weather: Clear, 49 °F (9 °C)
- Referee: Jim Tunney
- Point spread: Steelers by 8
- Game attendance: 51,657 at Candlestick Park in San Francisco
- TV announcers: (ABC) Frank Gifford (play by play), Don Meredith & Howard Cosell (color commentators)
- Game coverage: Pro Football Reference, Pittsburgh Post-Gazette recap

	1	2	3	4	Total
Steelers	3	14	0	7	24
49ers	0	0	7	0	7

The game proceeded as scheduled despite the murders of San Francisco Mayor George Moscone and Supervisor Harvey Milk by former Supervisor Dan White earlier in the day. Dianne Feinstein, Chairman of the Board of Supervisors, became Mayor upon Moscone's death.

The Steelers defeated the 49ers 27–0 at Three Rivers Stadium on Monday Night Football to open the previous season.

Scoring drives and statistics:

First quarter

- Pittsburgh – Roy Gerela 42 yard field goal

Second quarter

- Pittsburgh – Lynn Swann 22 yard pass from Terry Bradshaw (Gerela kick)
- Pittsburgh – Swann 25 yard pass from Bradshaw (Gerela kick)

Third quarter

- San Francisco – Paul Hofer 2 yard run (Ray Wersching kick)

Fourth quarter

- Pittsburgh – John Stallworth 11 yard pass from Bradshaw (Gerela kick)

Steelers	Game statistics	49ers
22	First downs	12
53–212	Rushes–yards	29–67
168	Passing yards	74
13–21–1	Passes	10–28–5
53	Return yards	53
3–42	Punts	5–40
5–3	Fumbles–lost	0–0
13–102	Penalties–yards	1–5

==== Week 14: at Houston Oilers ====
Week Fourteen: Pittsburgh Steelers (11–2) at Houston Oilers (9–4) – Game information
- Sunday, December 3 at 4:00 pm (EST)
- Game weather: dome
- Referee: Pat Haggerty
- Point spread: Oilers by 3
- Game attendance: 54,261 at the Astrodome in Houston, Texas
- TV announcers: (NBC) Sam Nover (play by play), Len Dawson (color commentator)
- Game coverage: Pro Football Reference, Pittsburgh Post-Gazette recap

	1	2	3	4	Total
Steelers	3	0	3	7	13
Oilers	0	3	0	0	3

Scoring drives and statistics:

First quarter

- Pittsburgh – Roy Gerela 41 yard field goal

Second quarter

- Houston – Toni Fritsch 37 yard field goal

Third quarter

- Pittsburgh – Gerela 23 yard field goal

Fourth quarter

- Pittsburgh – John Stallworth 5 yard pass from Terry Bradshaw (Gerela kick)

Steelers	Game statistics	Oilers
17	First downs	9
48–177	Rushes–yards	26–81
74	Passing yards	82
11–25–1	Passes	10–27–3
70	Return yards	34
5–40.2	Punts	5–47.8
1–1	Fumbles–lost	4–3
6–55	Penalties–yards	5–35

==== Week 15: vs. Baltimore Colts ====
Week Fifteen: Baltimore Colts (5–9) at Pittsburgh Steelers (12–2) – Game information
- Saturday, December 9 at 1:00 pm (EST)
- Game weather: Snow, 26 °F (−3 °C)
- Referee: Cal Lepore
- Point spread: Steelers by 10
- Game attendance: 41,957 at Three Rivers Stadium in Pittsburgh, Pennsylvania
- TV announcers: (NBC) Curt Gowdy (play by play), John Brodie (color commentator)
- Game coverage: Pro Football Reference, Pittsburgh Post-Gazette recap

	1	2	3	4	Total
Colts	0	7	6	0	13
Steelers	7	14	7	7	35

Scoring drives and statistics:

First quarter

- Pittsburgh – John Stallworth 31 yard pass from Terry Bradshaw (Roy Gerela kick)

Second quarter

- Pittsburgh – Franco Harris 3 yard run (Gerela kick)
- Pittsburgh – Harris 2 yard run (Gerela kick)
- Baltimore – Roger Carr 5 yard pass from Bill Troup (Toni Linhart kick)

Third quarter

- Baltimore – Derrell Luce 44 yard fumble recovery (kick failed)
- Pittsburgh – Randy Grossman 12 yard pass from Bradshaw (Gerela kick)

Fourth quarter

- Pittsburgh – Jim Smith 29 yard pass from Bradshaw (Gerela kick)

Steelers	Game statistics	Colts
20	First downs	11
48–139	Rushes–yards	26–100
234	Passing yards	29
12–21–2	Passes	8–19–2
121	Return yards	186
4–32.8	Punts	6–37.3
1–1	Fumbles–lost	5–3
6–35	Penalties–yards	6–50

==== Week 16: at Denver Broncos ====
Week Sixteen: Pittsburgh Steelers (13–2) at Denver Broncos (10–5) – Game information
- Saturday, December 16 at 4:00 pm (EST)
- Game weather: Sunny, 26 °F (−3 °C)
- Referee: Fred Wyant
- Point spread: Broncos by 1½
- Game attendance: 74,104 at Mile High Stadium in Denver, Colorado
- TV announcers: (NBC) Dick Enberg (play by play), Merlin Olsen (color commentator)
- Game coverage: Pro Football Reference, Pittsburgh Post-Gazette recap

	1	2	3	4	Total
Steelers	7	14	0	0	21
Broncos	0	0	7	10	17

Scoring drives and statistics:

First quarter

- Pittsburgh – Franco Harris 1 yard run (Roy Gerela kick)

Second quarter

- Pittsburgh – John Stallworth 25 yard pass from Terry Bradshaw (Gerela kick)
- Pittsburgh – Jim Smith 10 yard pass from Bradshaw (Gerela kick)

Third quarter

- Denver – Haven Moses 25 yard pass from Norris Weese (Jim Turner kick)

Fourth quarter

- Denver – Turner 45 yard field goal
- Denver – Riley Odoms 30 yard pass from Weese (Turner kick)

Steelers	Game statistics	Broncos
14	First downs	19
38–116	Rushes–yards	26–74
135	Passing yards	226
13–19–2	Passes	15–26–1
67	Return yards	80
6–46.3	Punts	6–42.3
2–0	Fumbles–lost	2–1
6–82	Penalties–yards	10–72

== Stats ==
Passing

Rushing

Receiving

Kicking

Punting

Kick Return

Punt Return

Defense & Fumbles

Scoring Summary

Team

Quarter-by-quarter

Quarter-by-quarter
	1	2	3	4	OT	T
Steelers	63	135	76	76	6	356
Opponents	6	63	57	69	0	195

== Playoffs ==
=== Schedule ===
Week	Date	Kickoff (ET)	TV	Opponent	Result	Game Site
Divisional	Sat. Dec. 30	12:30 p.m.	NBC	Denver Broncos	W 33–10	Three Rivers Stadium
AFC Championship	Sun. Jan. 7	12:30 p.m.	NBC	Houston Oilers	W 34–5	Three Rivers Stadium
Super Bowl XIII	Sun. Jan. 21	4:15 p.m.	NBC	vs. Dallas Cowboys	W 35–31	Miami Orange Bowl

=== Game summaries ===
==== AFC Divisional Playoff: vs. Denver Broncos ====
AFC Divisional Playoff: Denver Broncos at Pittsburgh Steelers – Game information
- Saturday, December 30 at 12:30 pm (EST)
- Game weather: Light Rain, 30 °F (−1 °C)
- Referee: Gene Barth
- Point spread: Steelers by 7
- Game attendance: 48,921 at Three Rivers Stadium in Pittsburgh, Pennsylvania
- TV announcers: (NBC) Dick Enberg (play by play), Merlin Olsen (color commentator)
- Game coverage: Pro Football Reference, Pittsburgh Post-Gazette recap

	1	2	3	4	Total
Broncos	3	7	0	0	10
Steelers	6	13	0	14	33

Scoring drives and statistics:

First quarter

- Denver Jim Turner 37 yard field goal
- Pittsburgh Franco Harris 1 yard run (kick failed)

Second quarter

- Pittsburgh Harris 18 yard run (Roy Gerela kick)
- Pittsburgh Gerela 24 yard field goal
- Denver Dave Preston 3 yard run (Turner kick)
- Pittsburgh Gerela 27 yard field goal

Third quarter

- No scoring plays

Fourth quarter

- Pittsburgh John Stallworth 45 yard pass from Terry Bradshaw (Gerela kick)
- Pittsburgh Lynn Swann 38 yard pass from Bradshaw (Gerela kick)

Steelers	Game statistics	Broncos
24	First downs	15
40–153	Rushes–yards	27–87
272	Passing yards	131
16–29–1	Passes	12–22–0
93	Return yards	110
2–36.0	Punts	6–34.0
4–1	Fumbles–lost	2–2
11–88	Penalties–yards	8–104

==== AFC Championship: vs. Houston Oilers ====
AFC Championship: Houston Oilers at Pittsburgh Steelers – Game information
- Sunday, January 7, 1979 at 12:30 pm (EST)
- Game weather: Freezing Rain, 32 °F (0 °C)
- Referee: Jim Tunney
- Point spread: Steelers by 7½
- Game attendance: 49,417 at Three Rivers Stadium in Pittsburgh, Pennsylvania
- TV announcers: (NBC) Curt Gowdy (play by play), Merlin Olsen & John Brodie (color commentators)
- Game coverage: Pro Football Reference, Pittsburgh Post-Gazette recap

	1	2	3	4	Total
Oilers	0	3	2	0	5
Steelers	14	17	3	0	34

On a wet, slick, and slippery field, the Steelers dominated the Oilers by forcing 9 turnovers and only allowing 5 points. Pittsburgh took the early lead by driving 57 yards to score on running back Franco Harris' 7-yard touchdown run. Then, linebacker Jack Ham recovered a fumble at the Houston 17-yard line, which led to running back Rocky Bleier's 15-yard rushing touchdown.

In the second quarter, a 19-yard field goal by Oilers kicker Toni Fritsch cut the score 14–3, but then the Steelers scored 17 points during the last 48 seconds of the second quarter. First, Houston running back Ronnie Coleman lost a fumble, and moments later Pittsburgh wide receiver Lynn Swann caught a 29-yard touchdown reception. Then Johnnie Dirden fumbled the ensuing kickoff, which led to Steelers wide receiver John Stallworth's 17-yard reception. After the Oilers got the ball back, Coleman fumbled again, and Roy Gerela kicked a field goal to increase Pittsburgh's lead, 31–3. Houston would never pose a threat for the rest of the game as they turned over the ball 4 times in their 6 second-half possessions.

Scoring drives and statistics:

First quarter

- Pittsburgh Franco Harris 7 yard run (Roy Gerela kick)
- Pittsburgh Rocky Bleier 15 yard run (Gerela kick)

Second quarter

- Houston Toni Fritsch 19 yard field goal
- Pittsburgh Lynn Swann 29 yard pass from Terry Bradshaw
- Pittsburgh John Stallworth 17 yard pass from Bradshaw
- Pittsburgh Gerela 37 yard field goal

Third quarter

- Pittsburgh Gerela 32 yard field goal
- Houston Safety, Ted Washington tackled Bleier in end zone

Fourth quarter

- No scoring plays

Steelers	Game statistics	Oilers
21	First downs	10
47–179	Rushes–yards	26–72
200	Passing yards	70
11–19–2	Passes	12–26–5
217	Return yards	179
1–53.0	Punts	6–39.5
6–3	Fumbles–lost	6–4
4–32	Penalties–yards	5–48

==== Super Bowl XIII: vs. Dallas Cowboys ====
Super Bowl XIII: Dallas Cowboys vs. Pittsburgh Steelers – Game information
- Sunday, January 21, 1979 at 4:15 pm (EST)
- Game weather: Cloudy, 71 °F (22 °C)
- Referee: Pat Haggerty
- Point spread: Steelers by 4
- Game attendance: 78,656 at Miami Orange Bowl in Miami, Florida
- TV announcers: (NBC) Curt Gowdy (play by play), Merlin Olsen & John Brodie (color commentators)
- Game coverage: Pro Football Reference, Pittsburgh Post-Gazette recap, Pittsburgh Press recap

	1	2	3	4	Total
Steelers	7	14	0	14	35
Cowboys	7	7	3	14	31

The Steelers won 35-31

Scoring drives and statistics:

First quarter

- Pittsburgh – John Stallworth 28 yard pass from Terry Bradshaw (Roy Gerela kick)
- Dallas – Tony Hill 39 yard pass from Roger Staubach (Rafael Septién kick)

Second quarter

- Dallas – Mike Hegman 37 yard fumble return (Septien kick)
- Pittsburgh – Stallworth 75 yard pass from Bradshaw (Gerela kick)
- Pittsburgh – Rocky Bleier 7 yard pass from Bradshaw (Gerela kick)

Third quarter

- Dallas – Septien 27 yard field goal

Fourth quarter

- Pittsburgh – Franco Harris 22 yard run (Gerela kick)
- Pittsburgh – Lynn Swann 18 yard pass from Bradshaw (Gerela kick)
- Dallas – Billy Joe Dupree 7 yard pass from Staubach (Septien kick)
- Dallas – Butch Johnson 4 yard pass from Staubach (Septien kick)

Steelers	Game statistics	Cowboys
19	First downs	20
24–66	Rushes–yards	32–141
318	Passing yards	228
17–30–1	Passes	17–30–1
35	Return yards	158
3–43.0	Punts	5–39.6
2–2	Fumbles–lost	3–2
5–35	Penalties–yards	9–89

== Personnel ==
=== Staff / Coaches ===
1978 Pittsburgh Steelers Staff
Front office: Owners – Art Rooney; President – Dan Rooney; Vice president/ scouting – Art Rooney, Jr.; Director of player personnel – Dick Haley; Head coaches: Head coach/ special teams – Chuck Noll; Offensive coaches: Offensive backfield – Dick Hoak; Wide receivers – Tom Moore; Offensive line – Rollie Dotsch	Defensive coaches: Defensive coordinator/ Def. line – George Perles; Linebackers – Woody Widenhofer; Defensive backs – Dick Walker; Special teams coaches: Flexibility/ kicking – Paul Uram; Strength – Lou Riecke

=== Roster ===
1978 Pittsburgh Steelers Roster
Quarterbacks: 12 Terry Bradshaw; 15 Mike Kruczek; 18 Cliff Stoudt; Running backs: 20 Rocky Bleier; 35 Jack Deloplaine; 32 Franco Harris; 28 Alvin Maxson; 39 Rick Moser; 38 Sidney Thornton; Wide receivers: 83 Theo Bell; 40 Randy Reutershan; 86 Jim Smith; 82 John Stallworth; 88 Lynn Swann; Tight ends: 89 Bennie Cunningham; 84 Randy Grossman; 87 Jim Mandich	Offensive linemen: 79 Larry Brown; 77 Steve Courson G; 57 Sam Davis G; 55 Jon Kolb; 72 Gerry Mullins G/T; 66 Ted Petersen; 74 Ray Pinney OL; 52 Mike Webster C/G; Defensive linemen: 69 Fred Anderson DL; 76 John Banaszak DL; 65 Tom Beasley DL; 67 Gary Dunn DL; 64 Steve Furness DT; 75 Joe Greene DT; 68 L. C. Greenwood DE; 78 Dwight White DE	Linebackers: 56 Robin Cole OLB/DE; 59 Jack Ham OLB; 58 Jack Lambert MLB; 51 Loren Toews LB/DE; 53} Dennis Winston LB; Defensive backs: 30 Larry Anderson; 47 Mel Blount CB; 21 Tony Dungy DB; 36 Wentford Gaines DB; 29 Ron Johnson DB; 25 Ray Oldham DB; 31 Donnie Shell S; 34 Nat Terry DB; 23 Mike Wagner CB; Special teams: 5 Craig Colquitt P; 10 Roy Gerela K	Reserve lists: 24 J. T. Thomas CB (IR); -- John Hicks G/T (IR); Rookies in italics Sources:

Defense

FS
Mike Wagner
⋅

WLB	MLB	SLB
Loren Toews	Jack Lambert	Jack Ham
Robin Cole	⋅	⋅

SS
Donnie Shell
⋅

CB
Mel Blount
⋅

DE	DT	DT	DE
Dwight White	John Banaszak	Joe Greene	L. C. Greenwood
⋅	Steve Furness	⋅	⋅

CB
Ron Johnson
⋅

Offense

WR
Lynn Swann
⋅

LT	LG	C	RG	RT
Jon Kolb	Sam Davis	Mike Webster	Gerry Mullins	Ray Pinney
⋅	⋅	⋅	⋅	Larry Brown

TE
Randy Grossman
Bennie Cunningham

WR
John Stallworth
⋅

QB
Terry Bradshaw
⋅

RB
Rocky Bleier
⋅

FB
Franco Harris
⋅

Special teams
PK Roy Gerela
P Craig Colquitt
KR Larry Anderson
PR Theo Bell

== Awards, honors, and records ==
Several Steelers players received individual honors in recognition of their play during the 1978 season. Terry Bradshaw swept the season's Most Valuable Player (MVP) recognition, earning both the regular season and Super Bowl honors as well as the team's internal MVP award. The team led the league with ten players selected to the 1979 Pro Bowl (a full quarter of the 40-player AFC squad). Among the Pro Bowlers were three offensive and two defensive starters. Eight Steeler performers were recognized as All-NFL by various publications and four others made All-Conference squads.

=== Pro Bowl Selections ===
The following players were selected to represent the AFC in the Pro Bowl. The team was selected on the basis of ballots submitted by each of the conference's 14 head coaches as well as a consensus of voting by each team's players.

Starters:

- QB Terry Bradshaw (second Pro Bowl)
- WR Lynn Swann (third)
- C Mike Webster (first)
- DT Joe Greene (ninth)
- LB Jack Ham (sixth)

Reserves:

- RB Franco Harris (seventh)
- DE L. C. Greenwood (fifth)
- LB Jack Lambert (fourth)
- S Donnie Shell^{[1]} (first)
- CB Mel Blount (third)

^{1} Mike Wagner was originally announced as the reserve safety, but an error in the tabulation of the ballots was uncovered and Donnie Shell was named to the team instead.

=== All-Pro Selections ===
The following players were named to All-NFL or All-Conference squads designated by one or more of several publications and groups who identified the players judged to be the top performers of the 1978 season.

Position	Player	All-NFL						All-AFC			
Position	Player	AP		NEA		PFW	PFWA	UPI		SN	PFW
Position	Player	1st	2nd	1st	2nd	PFW	PFWA	1st	2nd	SN	PFW
Quarterback	Terry Bradshaw	X			X	X	X	X		X	X
Running back	Franco Harris				X				X		
Wide receiver	Lynn Swann	X		X		X	X	X		X	X
Center	Mike Webster	X		X		X	X	X		X	X
Tackle	Jon Kolb								X		X
Defensive End	L. C. Greenwood								X	X	
Defensive tackle	Joe Greene								X		X
Linebacker	Jack Ham	X		X		X	X	X		X	X
Linebacker	Jack Lambert				X	X		X		X	X
Safety	Donnie Shell				X				X		
Safety	Mike Wagner								X		
Cornerback	Mel Blount		X						X		

=== Individual honors and achievements ===
- Terry Bradshaw, Steelers MVP (selected by a vote of the team's players)
- Bradshaw, Associated Press NFL Most Valuable Player (MVP) award
- Bradshaw, Super Bowl MVP
- Bradshaw, Bert Bell Award
- Bradshaw led league in touchdown passes (28).
- Bradshaw tied with Dan Fouts to lead league in yards per pass attempt (7.9 yds) .

=== Team achievements/records ===
- Fewest points scored against in league (195 points).
- Surrendered zero first-quarter touchdowns in the regular season.

== See also ==
- History of the Pittsburgh Steelers
- List of Pittsburgh Steelers seasons
- List of Super Bowl champions
