= List of Pittsburgh Steelers seasons =

The Pittsburgh Steelers compete in the National Football League (NFL) as a member club of the American Football Conference (AFC) North division. Founded in 1933, the Steelers are the oldest franchise in the AFC; seven franchises in the National Football Conference (NFC) have longer tenures in the NFL. The team struggled to be competitive in its early history, posting winning records in just 8 of its first 39 seasons. Since the AFL–NFL merger in 1970, however, it has appeared in eight Super Bowls and is one of only two teams, along with the New England Patriots, to have won the Super Bowl six times. The six championships place the Steelers fourth in the league in terms of total championships (including those prior to the first Super Bowl), trailing only the Green Bay Packers (13 championships), the Chicago Bears (9) and the New York Giants (8). The club's 16 AFC Championship Game appearances are the most all-time and behind only the 49ers (17) for total conference championship game appearances. In addition, they have hosted the second-most conference championship games (11) than any franchise in either conference, and are tied for second with the Dallas Cowboys and Denver Broncos with eight Super Bowl appearances; the Patriots currently hold the record of eleven appearances, as of 2021.

From 1974 to 1979 the franchise became the first NFL franchise to win four Super Bowl titles in six seasons, a feat which is yet to be matched. In 2005, the Steelers became the first #6 seed to advance to a conference championship game, and go on to win the Super Bowl, since the playoff field was expanded to 12 teams in 1990. The Steelers are 6–2 in the Super Bowl, winning Super Bowls IX, X, XIII, XIV, XL and XLIII while losing Super Bowls XXX and XLV.

As of the 2022 season, the Steelers franchise is tied for third with the Giants all-time in playoff appearances, with 33. The Steelers have the most playoff appearances among active AFC franchises, as well as the most since the official start of the NFL-AFL merger in 1970. The Cowboys (35) and Packers (35) are the only teams to have more playoff appearances. Coincidentally, these are also the only two teams to beat Pittsburgh in the Super Bowl.

== Seasons ==
Key to color-coding of list of seasons table
NFL champions (1920–1969)	Super Bowl champions (1966–present)	Conference champions	Division champions	Wild Card berth	One-game playoff berth

Season	Team	League	Conference	Division	Regular season					Postseason results	Awards	Head coaches
Season	Team	League	Conference	Division	Finish	W	L	T	Pct^{[1]}	Postseason results	Awards	Head coaches
Pittsburgh Pirates
1933	1933	NFL		East	5th	3	6	2	.364			Forrest Douds
1934	1934	NFL		East	5th	2	10	0	.167			Luby DiMeolo
1935	1935	NFL		East	3rd	4	8	0	.333			Joe Bach
1936	1936	NFL		East	2nd	6	6	0	.500			Joe Bach
1937	1937	NFL		East	3rd	4	7	0	.364			Johnny Blood
1938	1938	NFL		East	5th	2	9	0	.182			Johnny Blood
1939	1939	NFL		East	4th^{[T]}	1	9	1	.136			Johnny Blood (0–3) Walt Kiesling (1–6–1)
Pittsburgh Steelers
1940	1940	NFL		East	4th	2	7	2	.273			Walt Kiesling
1941	1941	NFL		East	5th	1	9	1	.136			Walt Kiesling (1–2–1) Aldo Donelli (0–5) Bert Bell (0–2)
1942	1942	NFL		East	2nd	7	4	0	.636			Walt Kiesling
Steagles
1943	1943	NFL		East	3rd	5	4	1	.550			Greasy Neale & Walt Kiesling
Card-Pitt
1944	1944	NFL		West	5th	0	10	0	.000			Phil Handler & Walt Kiesling
Pittsburgh Steelers
1945	1945	NFL		East	5th	2	8	0	.200			Jim Leonard
1946	1946	NFL		East	3rd^{[T]}	5	5	1	.500		Bill Dudley (MVP)	Jock Sutherland
1947	1947	NFL		East	2nd	8	4	0	.667	Lost Divisional Playoff (Eagles) 0–21		Jock Sutherland
1948	1948	NFL		East	3rd^{[T]}	4	8	0	.333			John Michelosen
1949	1949	NFL		East	2nd	6	5	1	.542			John Michelosen
1950	1950	NFL	American		3rd^{[T]}	6	6	0	.500			John Michelosen
1951	1951	NFL	American		4th	4	7	1	.375			John Michelosen
1952	1952	NFL	American		4th	5	7	0	.417			Joe Bach
1953	1953	NFL	Eastern		4th	6	6	0	.500			Joe Bach
1954	1954	NFL	Eastern		4th	5	7	0	.417			Walt Kiesling
1955	1955	NFL	Eastern		6th	4	8	0	.346			Walt Kiesling
1956	1956	NFL	Eastern		4th^{[T]}	5	7	0	.417			Walt Kiesling
1957	1957	NFL	Eastern		3rd	6	6	0	.500			Buddy Parker
1958	1958	NFL	Eastern		3rd	7	4	1	.625			Buddy Parker
1959	1959	NFL	Eastern		4th	6	5	1	.542			Buddy Parker
1960	1960	NFL	Eastern		5th	5	6	1	.458			Buddy Parker
1961	1961	NFL	Eastern		5th	6	8	0	.429			Buddy Parker
1962	1962	NFL	Eastern		2nd	9	5	0	.643			Buddy Parker
1963	1963	NFL	Eastern		4th	7	4	3	.607			Buddy Parker
1964	1964	NFL	Eastern		6th	5	9	0	.357			Buddy Parker
1965	1965	NFL	Eastern		7th	2	12	0	.143			Mike Nixon
1966	1966	NFL	Eastern		6th	5	8	1	.393			Bill Austin
1967	1967	NFL	Eastern	Century	4th	4	9	1	.321			Bill Austin
1968	1968	NFL	Eastern	Century	4th	2	11	1	.179			Bill Austin
1969	1969	NFL	Eastern	Century	4th	1	13	0	.071		Joe Greene (DROY)	Chuck Noll
1970	1970	NFL	AFC	Central	3rd	5	9	0	.357			Chuck Noll
1971	1971	NFL	AFC	Central	2nd	6	8	0	.429			Chuck Noll
1972	1972	NFL	AFC	Central	1st	11	3	0	.786	Won Divisional Playoffs (Raiders) 13–7; Lost AFC Championship (Dolphins) 17–21	Chuck Noll (AFC COY); Franco Harris (OROY); Joe Greene (DPOY); Dan Rooney (EOY)	Chuck Noll
1973	1973	NFL	AFC	Central	2nd	10	4	0	.714	Lost Divisional Playoffs (at Raiders) 14–33		Chuck Noll
1974	1974	NFL	AFC	Central	1st	10	3	1	.750	Won Divisional Playoffs (Bills) 32–14; Won AFC Championship (at Raiders) 24–13; Won Super Bowl IX (1) (vs. Vikings) 16–6	Franco Harris (SB MVP); Joe Greene (DPOY); Jack Lambert (DROY); Art Rooney (EOY)	Chuck Noll
1975	1975	NFL	AFC	Central	1st	12	2	0	.857	Won Divisional Playoffs (Colts) 28–10; Won AFC Championship (Raiders) 16–10; Won Super Bowl X (2) (vs. Cowboys) 21–17	Mel Blount (DPOY); Lynn Swann (SB MVP)	Chuck Noll
1976	1976	NFL	AFC	Central	1st	10	4	0	.714	Won Divisional Playoffs (at Colts) 40–14; Lost AFC Championship (at Raiders) 7–24	Jack Lambert (DPOY, AFC DPOY)	Chuck Noll
1977	1977	NFL	AFC	Central	1st	9	5	0	.643	Lost Divisional Playoffs (at Broncos) 21–34		Chuck Noll
1978	1978	NFL	AFC	Central	1st	14	2	0	.875	Won Divisional Playoffs (Broncos) 33–10; Won AFC Championship (Oilers) 34–5; Won Super Bowl XIII (3) (vs. Cowboys) 35–31	Terry Bradshaw (MVP, SB MVP, BBA)	Chuck Noll
1979	1979	NFL	AFC	Central	1st	12	4	0	.750	Won Divisional Playoffs (Dolphins) 34–14; Won AFC Championship (Oilers) 27–13; Won Super Bowl XIV (4) (vs. Rams) 31–19	Jack Lambert (AFC DPOY); Terry Bradshaw (SB MVP)	Chuck Noll
1980	1980	NFL	AFC	Central	3rd	9	7	0	.563			Chuck Noll
1981	1981	NFL	AFC	Central	2nd	8	8	0	.500			Chuck Noll
1982	1982	NFL	AFC	Central	4th^{[T]}^{[3]}	6	3	0	.667	Lost First Round Playoffs (Chargers) 28–31		Chuck Noll
1983	1983	NFL	AFC	Central	1st	10	6	0	.625	Lost Divisional Playoffs (at Raiders) 10–38		Chuck Noll
1984	1984	NFL	AFC	Central	1st	9	7	0	.563	Won Divisional Playoffs (at Broncos) 24–17; Lost AFC Championship (at Dolphins) 28–45	Louis Lipps (OROY); John Stallworth (CBPOY)	Chuck Noll
1985	1985	NFL	AFC	Central	3rd	7	9	0	.438			Chuck Noll
1986	1986	NFL	AFC	Central	3rd	6	10	0	.375			Chuck Noll
1987	1987	NFL	AFC	Central	3rd	8	7	0	.533			Chuck Noll
1988	1988	NFL	AFC	Central	4th	5	11	0	.313			Chuck Noll
1989	1989	NFL	AFC	Central	3rd	9	7	0	.563	Won Wild Card Playoffs (at Oilers) 26–23 (OT); Lost Divisional Playoffs (at Broncos) 23–24	Chuck Noll (MFC COY)	Chuck Noll
1990	1990	NFL	AFC	Central	3rd	9	7	0	.563			Chuck Noll
1991	1991	NFL	AFC	Central	2nd	7	9	0	.438			Chuck Noll
1992	1992	NFL	AFC	Central	1st	11	5	0	.688	Lost Divisional Playoffs (Bills) 3–24	Bill Cowher (NFL COY); Barry Foster (AFC OPOY)	Bill Cowher
1993	1993	NFL	AFC	Central	2nd	9	7	0	.563	Lost Wild Card Playoffs (at Chiefs) 24–27 (OT)	Rod Woodson (DPOY)	Bill Cowher
1994	1994	NFL	AFC	Central	1st	12	4	0	.750	Won Divisional Playoffs (Browns) 29–9; Lost AFC Championship (Chargers) 13–17	Greg Lloyd (AFC DPOY)	Bill Cowher
1995	1995	NFL	AFC	Central	1st	11	5	0	.688	Won Divisional Playoffs (Bills) 40–21; Won AFC Championship (Colts) 20–16; Lost Super Bowl XXX (vs. Cowboys) 17–27		Bill Cowher
1996	1996	NFL	AFC	Central	1st	10	6	0	.625	Won Wild Card Playoffs (Colts) 42–14; Lost Divisional Playoffs (at Patriots) 3–28	Jerome Bettis (CBPOY)	Bill Cowher
1997	1997	NFL	AFC	Central	1st	11	5	0	.688	Won Divisional Playoffs (Patriots) 7–6; Lost AFC Championship (Broncos) 21–24		Bill Cowher
1998	1998	NFL	AFC	Central	3rd	7	9	0	.438			Bill Cowher
1999	1999	NFL	AFC	Central	4th	6	10	0	.375			Bill Cowher
2000	2000	NFL	AFC	Central	3rd	9	7	0	.563			Bill Cowher
2001	2001	NFL	AFC	Central	1st	13	3	0	.813	Won Divisional Playoffs (Ravens) 27–10; Lost AFC Championship (Patriots) 17–24	Kendrell Bell (DROY); Dan Rooney (EOY)	Bill Cowher
2002	2002	NFL	AFC	North	1st	10	5	1	.656	Won Wild Card Playoffs (Browns) 36–33; Lost Divisional Playoffs (at Titans) 31–34 (OT)	Tommy Maddox (CBPOY)	Bill Cowher
2003	2003	NFL	AFC	North	3rd	6	10	0	.375			Bill Cowher
2004	2004	NFL	AFC	North	1st	15	1	0	.938	Won Divisional Playoffs (Jets) 20–17 (OT); Lost AFC Championship (Patriots) 27–41	Bill Cowher (TSN COY); Ben Roethlisberger (OROY)	Bill Cowher
2005	2005	NFL	AFC	North	2nd	11	5	0	.688	Won Wild Card Playoffs (at Bengals) 31–17; Won Divisional Playoffs (at Colts) 21–18; Won AFC Championship (at Broncos) 34–17; Won Super Bowl XL (5) (vs. Seahawks) 21–10	Hines Ward (SB MVP); Art Rooney II (EOY)	Bill Cowher
2006	2006	NFL	AFC	North	3rd	8	8	0	.500			Bill Cowher
2007	2007	NFL	AFC	North	1st	10	6	0	.625	Lost Wild Card Playoffs (Jaguars) 29–31		Mike Tomlin
2008	2008	NFL	AFC	North	1st	12	4	0	.750	Won Divisional Playoffs (Chargers) 35–24; Won AFC Championship (Ravens) 23–14; Won Super Bowl XLIII (6) (vs. Cardinals) 27–23	James Harrison (DPOY); Santonio Holmes (SB MVP); Mike Tomlin (Motorola NFL COY)	Mike Tomlin
2009	2009	NFL	AFC	North	3rd	9	7	0	.563			Mike Tomlin
2010	2010	NFL	AFC	North	1st	12	4	0	.750	Won Divisional Playoffs (Ravens) 31–24; Won AFC Championship (Jets) 24–19; Lost Super Bowl XLV (vs. Packers) 25–31	Troy Polamalu (DPOY)	Mike Tomlin
2011	2011	NFL	AFC	North	2nd	12	4	0	.750	Lost Wild Card Playoffs (at Broncos) 23–29 (OT)		Mike Tomlin
2012	2012	NFL	AFC	North	3rd	8	8	0	.500			Mike Tomlin
2013	2013	NFL	AFC	North	2nd	8	8	0	.500			Mike Tomlin
2014	2014	NFL	AFC	North	1st	11	5	0	.688	Lost Wild Card Playoffs (Ravens) 17–30		Mike Tomlin
2015	2015	NFL	AFC	North	2nd	10	6	0	.625	Won Wild Card Playoffs (at Bengals) 18–16; Lost Divisional Playoffs (at Broncos) 16–23		Mike Tomlin
2016	2016	NFL	AFC	North	1st	11	5	0	.688	Won Wild Card Playoffs (Dolphins) 30–12; Won Divisional Playoffs (at Chiefs) 18–16; Lost AFC Championship (at Patriots) 17–36		Mike Tomlin
2017	2017	NFL	AFC	North	1st	13	3	0	.813	Lost Divisional Playoffs (Jaguars) 42–45		Mike Tomlin
2018	2018	NFL	AFC	North	2nd	9	6	1	.594			Mike Tomlin
2019	2019	NFL	AFC	North	2nd	8	8	0	.500			Mike Tomlin
2020	2020	NFL	AFC	North	1st	12	4	0	.750	Lost Wild Card Playoffs (Browns) 37–48		Mike Tomlin
2021	2021	NFL	AFC	North	2nd	9	7	1	.559	Lost Wild Card Playoffs (at Chiefs) 21–42	T. J. Watt (DPOY)	Mike Tomlin
2022	2022	NFL	AFC	North	3rd	9	8	0	.529			Mike Tomlin
2023	2023	NFL	AFC	North	3rd	10	7	0	.588	Lost Wild Card Playoffs (at Bills) 17–31	Cameron Heyward (WP MOY)	Mike Tomlin
2024	2024	NFL	AFC	North	2nd	10	7	0	.588	Lost Wild Card Playoffs (at Ravens) 14–28		Mike Tomlin
2025	2025	NFL	AFC	North	1st	10	7	0	.588	Lost Wild Card Playoffs (Texans) 6–30		Mike Tomlin
2026	2026	NFL	AFC	North	TBD	6	2	0	.750			Mike McCarthy
Totals 6 Super Bowl Championships 8 AFC Conference Championships 25 Division titles						697	594	22	.539	1933–2025, regular season only		
Totals 6 Super Bowl Championships 8 AFC Conference Championships 25 Division titles						36	30	—	.545	1933–2025, playoffs only		
Totals 6 Super Bowl Championships 8 AFC Conference Championships 25 Division titles						733	624	22	.540	1933–2025, regular season and playoff games		

Notes:

The Finish, Wins, Losses, Ties and Pct columns include only regular season results. Postseason results are shown only within the "Playoffs" column. Regular and postseason records are combined only at the bottom of the table.
^{T} Tied for this position with at least one other team
^{1} For the purposes of calculating winning percentage ties count as ½ win and ½ loss
^{2} The Playoff Bowl (a.k.a. Bert Bell Benefit Bowl) is regarded as an unofficial post-season exhibition for third place
^{3} Ranked by conference rather than division (strike shortened season).
