= Randy Reutershan =

American football player (born 1955)

Randy "the Rat" Reutershan
No. 40
- Positions: Wide receiver, return specialist, defensive back

Personal information
- Born: June 30, 1955 (age 71); New York City, New York, U.S.
- Listed height: 5 ft 10 in (1.78 m)
- Listed weight: 182 lb (83 kg)

Career information
- High school: Mahwah (Mahwah, New Jersey)
- College: Pittsburgh
- NFL draft: 1978: 6th round, 160th overall pick

Career history
- Pittsburgh Steelers (1978)

Awards and highlights
- Super Bowl champion (XIII); National champion (1976)

Career NFL statistics
- Games played: 11
- Punt returns: 20
- Punt return yards: 148
- Stats at Pro Football Reference

Randy Reutershan (born June 30, 1955) is an American former professional football player who performed in a single season in the National Football League (NFL) for the Pittsburgh Steelers. He was a member of teams that won a college football national championship and Super Bowl XIII over the Dallas Cowboys.

== Early life ==
Reutershan was born in New York City to Warren and Doris Reutershan. He attended Mahwah High School in Mahwah, New Jersey where he earned letters three years in football, basketball and track.

== Football career ==
Reutershan attended the University of Pittsburgh. In his junior season he was a wide receiver and special teams ace on the Panthers team which won the national championship. He had 17 catches for 311 yards in his senior season at Pitt in 1977. His tenacity as a special teams player, particularly his love of tackling on the coverage team, earned him the nickname "the Rat." His college coach, Johnny Majors called Reutershan, "the most dynamic special teams performer I have ever seen."

Reutershan was selected by the Pittsburgh Steelers in the sixth round of the 1978 NFL draft. He made the team as a defensive back after switching back and forth from wide receiver during training camp. He played in eleven games in his rookie season, contributing primarily on special teams. His season was cut short in mid-November by a single vehicle roll-over automobile accident that left him with severe head injuries for which he was hospitalized for a full month. Although he would eventually recover from his injuries, he was advised to discontinue his professional football career.

Reutershan returned to his alma mater, Pittsburgh, as a wide receivers coach under Jackie Sherrill in 1979.
