= Fred Anderson (American football) =

American football player (born 1954)

No. 69, 63
- Position: Lineman

Personal information
- Born: October 30, 1954 (age 72); Toppenish, Washington, U.S.
- Listed height: 6 ft 4 in (1.93 m)
- Listed weight: 238 lb (108 kg)

Career information
- High school: Toppenish
- College: Oregon State; Prairie View A&M
- NFL draft: 1978: undrafted

Career history
- Pittsburgh Steelers (1978–1979); Seattle Seahawks (1980–1982)

Awards and highlights
- 2× Super Bowl champion (XIII, XIV)
- Stats at Pro Football Reference

Fredell Lamont Anderson (born October 30, 1954) is an American former professional football player who was a defensive lineman in the National Football League (NFL) for the Pittsburgh Steelers from 1978 to 1979 and Seattle Seahawks from 1980 to 1982. He played college football for the Oregon State Beavers and Prairie View A&M Panthers.

== Early life ==
Anderson was born in Toppenish, Washington in 1954 and attended Toppenish High School.

== Career ==
He played college football for Oregon State University and Prairie View A&M University. He was then drafted by the Pittsburgh Steelers. He stayed there for the 1980 season before being released, and won Super Bowl XIII against the Dallas Cowboys and Super Bowl XIV against the Los Angeles Rams. He was later picked up by the Seattle Seahawks in 1980, where he stayed for three seasons.
