= Nat Terry =

American football player (born 1956)

No. 41, 30
- Positions: Return specialist, defensive back

Personal information
- Born: July 20, 1956 (age 70); Tampa, Florida, U.S.
- Listed height: 5 ft 11 in (1.80 m)
- Listed weight: 167 lb (76 kg)

Career information
- High school: Robinson (Tampa)
- College: Florida State
- NFL draft: 1978: 11th round, 279th overall pick

Career history
- Pittsburgh Steelers (1978); Detroit Lions (1978)

Career NFL statistics
- Games played: 10
- Punt returns/ yards: 7/ 80
- Kick returns/ yards: 7/ 145
- Stats at Pro Football Reference

Nathaniel Terry (born July 20, 1956) is an American former professional football player who was a defensive back and return specialist for one season in the National Football League (NFL) with the Pittsburgh Steelers and Detroit Lions. He played college football for the Florida State Seminoles.

== Early life ==
Terry was born in Tampa, Florida, and attended Robinson High School then Florida State University in Tallahassee, Florida, where twice lettered in football. He was an honorable mention All-American selection in his senior season.

== Professional career ==
Terry was selected in the eleventh round of the 1978 NFL draft by the Pittsburgh Steelers. Although he was considered undersized to play cornerback in the NFL he made up for it with his speed (he was timed at 4.4 seconds in the 40-yard dash). After making the Steelers' roster and playing the first six games of the season (primarily on special teams), he was cut to make room for another player.

The Detroit Lions claimed Terry off waivers the next day. On the opening kickoff of his fourth game with the Lions he suffered a chipped vertebrae in his neck and was placed on the injured reserve list, ending his season and eventually his playing career.
