= Dick Walker (American football) =

American football player and coach (1933–2013)

Profile
- Positions: Center, linebacker

Personal information
- Born: January 21, 1933; Cleveland, Ohio, U.S.
- Died: January 14, 2013 (aged 79); Las Vegas, Nevada, U.S.

Career information
- High school: Cleveland (OH) East
- College: John Carroll

Career history
- Watterson HS (1960–1966) Head coach; Toledo (1967–1968) Assistant coach; Navy (1969) Assistant coach; Ohio State (1969–1976) Defensive backs coach; New England Patriots (1977) Defensive backs coach; Pittsburgh Steelers (1978–1981) Defensive backs coach; Montreal Concordes (1982) Defensive secondary coach; Chicago Blitz (1983) Defensive backs coach; Meadowcreek HS (1999–2001) Head coach

Awards and highlights
- 2× Super Bowl champion (XIII, XIV); John Carroll University Hall of Fame (2006)

Richard Walker (January 21, 1933 – January 15, 2013) was an American football coach and player. He has worked at the professional, college and high school levels. He coached on two Super Bowl-winning teams with the Pittsburgh Steelers of the National Football League (NFL).

== Early life ==
Walker is a native of Cleveland, Ohio. He attended Cleveland's East High School, where he played football. Walker played college football at John Carroll University in nearby University Heights, Ohio. He played four years (three as a starter) at center and linebacker for the Blue Streaks, including playing all 60 minutes of every game in his junior and senior seasons. He was a three-time letterman. He graduated from John Carrol University in 1955.

== Coaching career ==
Walker has spent most of his life coaching football. In the early 1960s, he compiled a record of 51–11–3 as head coach at Bishop Watterson High School in Columbus, Ohio. He got his first college coaching job in 1967 mentoring defensive backs at the University of Toledo in Toledo, Ohio. After two seasons at Toledo, he spent a year coaching at the U.S. Naval Academy in Annapolis, Maryland.

The New England Patriots gave Walker his first professional football opportunity as their defensive backs coach in 1977. The following season, Walker took a similar position with the Pittsburgh Steelers. Walker was on the staff of two Pittsburgh teams which won Super Bowls, in 1978 and 1979. He left the Steelers after the 1981 season.

Walker later coached with the Canadian Football League's Montreal Concordes the short-lived United States Football League's Chicago Blitz and at various high schools in Georgia and Las Vegas.

== Honors ==
Walker was inducted into John Carroll University's Hall of Fame in 2006.
