= Rick Moser =

American football player and actor (born 1956)

No. 39, 31, 35
- Position: Running back

Personal information
- Born: December 18, 1956 (age 69); White Plains, New York, U.S.
- Listed height: 6 ft 0 in (1.83 m)
- Listed weight: 215 lb (98 kg)

Career information
- High school: Scarsdale (Scarsdale, New York)
- College: Rhode Island
- NFL draft: 1978: 8th round, 208th overall pick

Career history
- Pittsburgh Steelers (1978–1979); Miami Dolphins (1980); Kansas City Chiefs (1981); Pittsburgh Steelers (1981); Tampa Bay Buccaneers (1982)

Awards and highlights
- 2× Super Bowl champion (XIII, XIV)

Career NFL statistics
- Rushing yards: 190
- Rushing average: 3.5
- Rushing touchdowns: 1
- Stats at Pro Football Reference

Richard A. Moser (born December 18, 1956) is an American actor and a former professional football running back who played for the Pittsburgh Steelers, Miami Dolphins, Kansas City Chiefs, and Tampa Bay Buccaneers of the National Football League (NFL). Moser attended Scarsdale High School and the University of Rhode Island, where he was a two-time first team NCAA Academic All-American, graduating summa cum laude with a B.S. in marketing. Moser was elected in 1978 to the Beta Gamma Sigma National Business Honor Society, and held the position of secretary.

== Football career ==
Selected in the eighth round of the 1978 NFL draft by the Pittsburgh Steelers, Moser played in parts of five NFL seasons between 1978 and 1982 for four different teams, carrying the ball 54 times for 190 yards and one touchdown. He also caught three passes for 20 yards and one score and returned six kickoffs for 108 yards in his professional career. His primary contribution was on special teams. Moser was a member of two Super Bowl winning teams with the Steelers following the 1978 (Super Bowl XIII) and 1979 (Super Bowl XIV) seasons. In Super Bowl XIV, Moser recorded a Super Bowl record of five tackles on the kickoff team.

== Acting career ==
Moser has acted in several movies, most notably as the high-sock-wearing assistant football coach in Dazed and Confused, as a football player in Everybody's All-American, and as himself in Fighting Back: The Rocky Bleier Story. He has appeared in the popular television series The Facts of Life and Diff'rent Strokes, and had recurring roles on ABC's General Hospital and HBO's 1st & Ten. Moser appeared in numerous national TV commercials and had modeled in print advertisements.
