= Bob Schmitz =

American football player (1938–2004)

No. 67, 54, 35
- Position: Linebacker

Personal information
- Born: September 10, 1938; Marytown, Wisconsin, U.S.
- Died: June 8, 2004 (aged 65); Glendale, Arizona, U.S.
- Listed height: 6 ft 1 in (1.85 m)
- Listed weight: 235 lb (107 kg)

Career information
- High school: New Holstein (WI)
- College: Wisconsin (1956); Montana State (1957-1960)
- NFL draft: 1961: 14th round, 187th overall pick
- AFL draft: 1961: 12th round, 90th overall pick

Career history
- Pittsburgh Steelers (1961–1966); Minnesota Vikings (1966)

Career NFL statistics
- Interceptions: 3
- Touchdowns: 1
- Safeties: 1
- Stats at Pro Football Reference

Robert Joseph Schmitz (September 10, 1938 – June 8, 2004) was an American professional football linebacker who played professionally in the National Football League (NFL) for the Pittsburgh Steelers. Schmitz graduated from New Holstein High School in New Holstein, Wisconsin. He then went on to initially attend college at University of Wisconsin–Madison, then at Montana State University where he earned a Bachelor's degree in Business Administration.

== Playing career ==
Schmitz was drafted by the Pittsburgh Steelers in the 14th round of the 1961 NFL draft. Schmitz was also drafted in the 1961 AFL draft by the Oakland Raiders, but he chose the Steelers. He is most notable for playing linebacker for the Pittsburgh Steelers from 1961 to 1966. Schmitz played in a total of 51 NFL games. During his career he recorded three interceptions for 65 yards and a touchdown. Also, he recorded one safety from the linebacker spot. Perhaps his most memorable moment came at Pitt Stadium on November 10, 1963, where he recorded his only safety. Schmitz tackled Pro Football Hall of Fame running back Jim Brown of the Cleveland Browns in the end zone for a safety that gave the Steelers a 9–7 victory. Schmitz was then named NFL Player of the Week for his winning score. After winning the honor Schmitz said, "Gee, that's probably the best thing that ever happened to me." His last season in the NFL came in 1966; a season in which he split time between the Pittsburgh Steelers and the Minnesota Vikings.

== Scouting ==
After his playing career ended Schmitz took up scouting in the NFL. In 1971, he was hired by the NFL's BLESTO combine, a scouting service that was located in Pittsburgh. He joined the Pittsburgh Steelers as an area scout in 1976 after being hired by Art Rooney, Jr. Schmitz worked for the Steelers until 1995. Schmitz then accepted a scouting job for the New York Jets in 1995 because he was offered more money by his former boss with the Steelers Dick Haley. Schmitz assisted the Jets with their drafts and college free agent signing periods. Throughout his career Schmitz specialty was grading defensive players. Schmitz retired as a scout on June 1, 2004, after a successful 33-year run.

== Death ==
On June 8, 2004, Schmitz died at his home in Glendale, Arizona, at the age of 65. His death was ruled an apparent heart attack. He was inducted into the Pittsburgh Pro Football Hall of Fame.
