= David Trout =

American football player (born 1957)

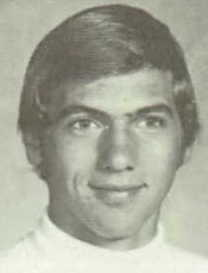
- Trout at Southmoreland High School in 1975

No. 1, 5
- Position: Placekicker

Personal information
- Born: November 12, 1957 (age 68); Mount Pleasant, Pennsylvania, U.S.
- Listed height: 5 ft 6 in (1.68 m)
- Listed weight: 165 lb (75 kg)

Career information
- High school: Southmoreland (PA)
- College: Pittsburgh
- NFL draft: 1981: undrafted

Career history
- Pittsburgh Steelers (1981); Philadelphia/Baltimore Stars (1983-1985); Minnesota Vikings (1986)*; Dallas Cowboys (1987)*; Pittsburgh Steelers (1987)
- * Offseason or practice squad member only

Awards and highlights
- 2× USFL champion (1984, 1985); USFL scoring leader (1983)

Career NFL statistics
- Field goals: 12
- Field goal attempts: 19
- Field goal %: 63.2
- Longest field goal: 48
- Stats at Pro Football Reference

David Marshall Trout (born November 12, 1957) is a former kicker who played professional American football in the National Football League (NFL) for the Pittsburgh Steelers in 1981 and 1987. He also played for the Philadelphia/Baltimore Stars of the United States Football League (USFL) from 1983 through 1985, helping the club win back-to-back league titles in 1984 and 1985.

== Early life ==
While born in Mount Pleasant, Pennsylvania, Trout lived much of his early life in Bolivia where his parents were missionaries. Here he conditioned his leg, playing soccer at the age of 12. Trout would go on to attend Southmoreland High School in Alverton, Pennsylvania. From 1974 until 2024, Trout held the record for the longest field goal in school history at 48 yards. After graduation, he would then attend the University of Pittsburgh where he was a placekicker for the Pittsburgh Panthers from 1977 until 1981.

== Professional career ==
Trout went undrafted in the 1981 NFL draft. That same year, he signed with his hometown team, the Pittsburgh Steelers. During the 1981 season, Trout appeared in all 16 regular season games as the team's backup kicker, attempting 17 field goals, making 12 of them. He was released by the Steelers after the 1981 season. In 1983 he would sign with the Philadelphia/Baltimore Stars of the USFL, where he was the team's starting kicker until the conclusion of the 1985 season. During his time with the Stars, he kicked for 116 field goal attempts, making 76. In 1987, the Steelers would re-sign Trout where he would appear in three games. He would only have two field goal attempts all season, missing both of them. Trout did, however, make all 10 of his extra point attempts. He was cut by the Steelers after the 1987 season.

== Post-retirement ==
After retiring from football, Trout worked as a missionary, building homes in Florida and then went into Youth Ministry where he was a Youth Pastor at St. Johns church in Turnersville, New Jersey. In 1994, he attended Piedmont College in North Carolina where he received an Airframe and Powerplant license to build and fly aircraft. He then used his degree to become a bush pilot, to bring supplies to the people. To do this Trout would have to fly in and out of Mexico, landing the small planes. The air strips were in mountainous regions and extremely small to land the planes. After leaving the mission, he returned to New Jersey and built houses in the area as a contractor. He now serves in Bolivia where he grew up working with mechanics on airplanes and inspecting.

== Career stats ==
Team	Year	XPM	XPA	XP%	FGM	FGA	FG%	PTS
Pittsburgh Steelers	1981	38	46	82.6	12	17	70.6	74
Philadelphia Stars	1983	37	40	92.5	28	42	66.7	121
Philadelphia Stars	1984	49	53	92.5	26	40	65.0	127
Baltimore Stars	1985	38	39	97.4	22	34	64.7	104
Pittsburgh Steelers	1987	10	10	100	0	2	0.0	10
Career		172	188	91.5	88	135	65.2	436
