= Tom Beasley =

American football player (born 1954)

No. 65, 67
- Position: Defensive lineman

Personal information
- Born: August 11, 1954 (age 72); Bluefield, West Virginia, U.S.
- Listed height: 6 ft 5 in (1.96 m)
- Listed weight: 253 lb (115 kg)

Career information
- High school: Northfork (WV)
- College: Virginia Tech
- NFL draft: 1977: 3rd round, 60th overall pick

Career history
- Pittsburgh Steelers (1978–1983); Washington Redskins (1984–1986)

Awards and highlights
- 2× Super Bowl champion (1978, 1979)

Career NFL statistics
- Games played: 105
- Fumble recoveries: 4
- Sacks: 11.5
- Stats at Pro Football Reference

Thomas Lynn Beasley (born August 11, 1954) is an American former professional football player who was a defensive lineman in the National Football League (NFL) for the Washington Redskins and Pittsburgh Steelers. Beasley won two Super Bowl rings when playing with the Steelers, in the 1978 and 1979 seasons. He played college football for the Virginia Tech Hokies. His accomplishments at Tech led to his induction into the Virginia Tech Sports Hall of Fame in 1988.

Beasley is a native of Elkhorn, West Virginia, and played for Northfork High School.

In his senior season for the Gobblers in 1976, Beasley was in on 78 tackles, 11 of them for loss. As a senior, he made the All-South Independent team and was honorable mention All-America as the Gobblers posted a 6–5 mark. After his senior season he was selected to play in the Blue-Gray game and the American Bowl, highlighting senior standouts.

Beasley was the 60th overall pick by the Steelers, going in the third round of the 1977 NFL draft. In 1979, he established what was then a Steeler's record with 11 solo tackles in a start against the Houston Oilers. He was named NFL Defensive Player of the week for his effort. He ended his career with 11.5 sacks, his best year coming in 1982 when he had 6.5 for the Steelers.

His son, Chad Beasley, also played for Virginia Tech and in the NFL.
