= John Stallworth =

American football player (born 1952)

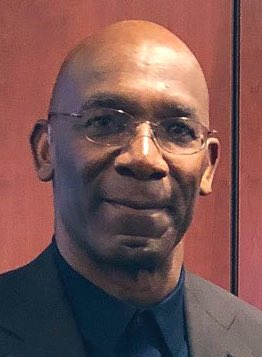
- Stallworth in 2019

No. 82
- Position: Wide receiver

Personal information
- Born: July 15, 1952 (age 74); Tuscaloosa, Alabama, U.S.
- Listed height: 6 ft 2 in (1.88 m)
- Listed weight: 191 lb (87 kg)

Career information
- High school: Tuscaloosa
- College: Alabama A&M (1970–1973)
- NFL draft: 1974: 4th round, 82nd overall pick

Career history
- Pittsburgh Steelers (1974–1987)

Awards and highlights
- 4× Super Bowl champion (IX, X, XIII, XIV); NFL Comeback Player of the Year (1984); First-team All-Pro (1979); Second-team All-Pro (1984); 3× Pro Bowl (1979, 1982, 1984); George Halas Award (1985); Pittsburgh Steelers All-Time Team; Pittsburgh Steelers Hall of Honor; Alabama A&M Bulldogs No. 22 retired

Career NFL statistics
- Receptions: 537
- Receiving yards: 8,723
- Receiving touchdowns: 63
- Stats at Pro Football Reference
- Pro Football Hall of Fame

Johnny Lee Stallworth (born July 15, 1952) is an American former professional football player who was a wide receiver for 14 seasons in the National Football League (NFL) for the Pittsburgh Steelers. He played college football for the Alabama A&M Bulldogs, and was the Steelers' fourth-round draft pick in 1974. Stallworth played in six AFC championships, and went to four Super Bowls, winning all four. His career statistics included 537 receptions for 8,723 yards and 63 touchdowns. Stallworth's reception total was a franchise record until being surpassed by Hines Ward in 2005. Stallworth played in three Pro Bowls and was the Steelers' two-time MVP. He was inducted into the Pro Football Hall of Fame in 2002.

== College career ==
A native of Tuscaloosa, Alabama, Stallworth was an All-Southern Intercollegiate Athletic Conference receiver for Alabama A&M in 1972 and 1973. Stallworth earned a Bachelor of Science degree in Business Administration and an MBA with a concentration in Finance from Alabama A&M University.

He was inducted into the Black College Football Hall of Fame in 2014.

== Professional career ==
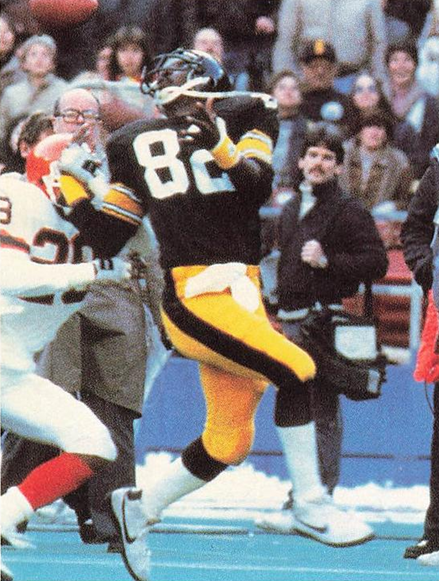
1986 card of Stallworth in action against Cleveland Browns

Stallworth was selected 82nd overall in the fourth round of the 1974 NFL draft, a class of which he was one of four Pittsburgh Steelers picks who would eventually be inducted into the Pro Football Hall of Fame. Scouts from various NFL teams observed him run the 40-yard dash on a wet track at Alabama A&M University and were disappointed by the results. Steelers assistant personnel director Bill Nunn was the only person to stay an additional day and watched Stallworth run a better time on a dry track. Nunn also had obtained the only college game film of Stallworth that existed through his relationships with HBCU coaches, and it was alleged that he withheld it from other NFL teams. After a rookie year as an understudy, Stallworth became a starter in his second season and held that job for the rest of his 165-game career. Stallworth battled a series of fibula, foot, ankle, knee and hamstring injuries that forced him to miss 44 regular-season games.

=== Super Bowls ===
In Super Bowl XIII, Stallworth caught a record-tying 75-yard touchdown pass from Terry Bradshaw that was crucial in the 35–31 win over the Dallas Cowboys. He suffered leg cramps later and played sparingly in the second half, finishing with three receptions for 115 yards and two touchdowns.

One year later at Super Bowl XIV with the Steelers trailing the Los Angeles Rams 19–17 early in the fourth quarter, Steelers' coach Chuck Noll called for "60-Prevent-Slot-Hook-And-Go," a play the Steelers failed in practice before the big game. With 12 minutes remaining, Bradshaw dropped back and threw it long to Stallworth, who caught it and beat Rod Perry to the end zone for a 73-yard touchdown that paved the way for the Steelers' 31–19 win and their fourth world championship. Sports Illustrated considered the catch notable enough to put Stallworth on the cover of a subsequent issue. Overall, Stallworth recorded three receptions for 121 yards in the game.

Stallworth holds the Super Bowl records for career average per catch (24.4 yards) and single-game average, 40.33 yards in Super Bowl XIV. He has 12 touchdown receptions and a string of 17 straight games with a reception in post-season play. Stallworth also scored on touchdown receptions in eight straight playoff games at one point (1978–1983), an NFL record.

=== Other highlights ===
Stallworth led the AFC with a career-high 1,395 yards gained on 80 receptions in 1984, when he was named the NFL Comeback Player of the Year by the PFWA. He helped the Steelers defeat eventual Super Bowl champion San Francisco for that team's only loss of the season, and led the Steelers in a playoff run that featured an upset win over the Denver Broncos in the AFC Divisional Playoffs at Denver's Mile High Stadium.

Stallworth was inducted into the Pro Football Hall of Fame in August 2002.

== NFL career statistics ==
Legend
	Won the Super Bowl
**Bold**	Career high

Year	Team	GP	Receiving				
Year	Team	GP	Rec	Yards	Avg	Lng	TD
1974	PIT	13	16	269	16.8	56	1
1975	PIT	11	20	423	21.2	59	4
1976	PIT	8	9	111	12.3	25	2
1977	PIT	14	44	784	17.8	49	7
1978	PIT	16	41	798	19.5	70	9
1979	PIT	16	70	1,183	16.9	65	8
1980	PIT	3	9	197	**21.9**	50	1
1981	PIT	16	63	1,098	17.4	55	5
1982	PIT	9	27	441	16.3	**74**	7
1983	PIT	4	8	100	12.5	20	0
1984	PIT	16	**80**	**1,395**	17.4	51	**11**
1985	PIT	16	75	937	12.5	41	5
1986	PIT	11	34	436	13.7	40	1
1987	PIT	12	41	521	12.7	45	2
Career		165	537	8,723	16.2	74	63

== Business career ==
In 1986, he founded Madison Research Corporation (MRC) alongside Samuel Hazelrig. MRC specializes in providing engineering and information technology services to government and commercial clients. Under Stallworth and Hazelrig's leadership, MRC grew to more than 650 employees and $69.5 million in revenues (FY03). MRC managed six regional offices: Huntsville, Alabama (headquarters); Warner Robins, Georgia; Orlando, Florida and Shalimar, Florida; Montgomery, Alabama; Houston, Texas; and Dayton, Ohio. In October 2006 the sale of MRC to Wireless Facilities Inc. was completed, and at that time it was announced that Stallworth would pursue other interests.

Stallworth was announced as becoming part-owner of his former team on March 23, 2009, as part of the Rooney family restructuring ownership of the team.
