= Art Rooney Jr. =

American football executive (born 1935)

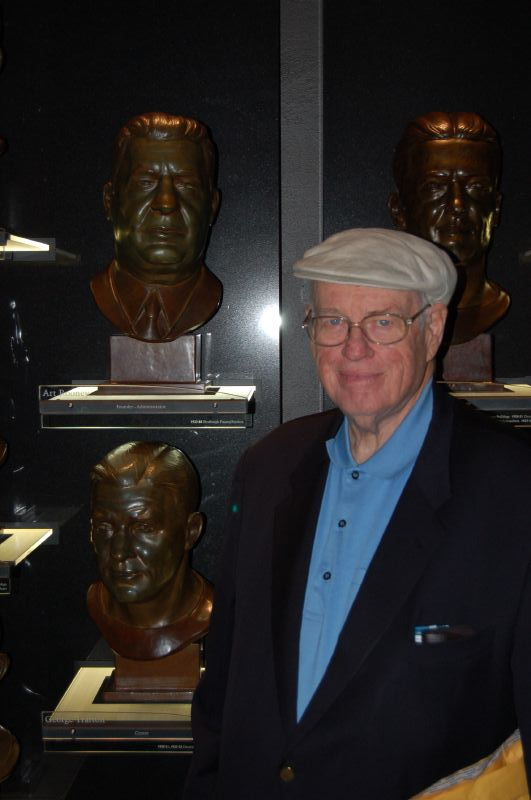
- Rooney at the Pro Football Hall of Fame in 2008

Pittsburgh Steelers
- Title: Vice president

Personal information
- Born: October 18, 1935 (age 91); Pittsburgh, Pennsylvania, U.S.

Career information
- Position: Tackle
- High school: North Catholic (PA)
- College: Saint Vincent (1953–1956)

Career history
- Pittsburgh Steelers (1961–present); Various roles (1961–1964); Personnel director (1965–1986); Vice president (1987–present)

Awards and highlights
- 6× Super Bowl champion (IX, X, XIII, XIV, XL, XLIII); Pittsburgh Steelers Hall of Honor (2018)

Arthur Joseph Rooney Jr. (born October 18, 1935) is an American professional football executive who is the vice president for the Pittsburgh Steelers of the National Football League (NFL). The son of the team's founder, Art Rooney, he has been employed by the team since the 1961 season.

Rooney served as the Steelers' personnel director from 1965 to 1986 and helped them have one of the best drafting runs in league history over a span from 1969 to 1974 while presiding over their scouting department, helping them select nine players who were later inducted into the Pro Football Hall of Fame and signing another as an undrafted free agent. This contributed to them winning four Super Bowls in six years, and Rooney has in total been a member of six league championship teams. He was inducted into the Pittsburgh Steelers Hall of Honor in 2018 and has been considered for induction to the Pro Football Hall of Fame on several occasions.

== Early life ==
Rooney was born in 1935 in Pittsburgh, Pennsylvania, the son of Pittsburgh Steelers founder Art Rooney. He has been associated with the team for all his life, starting as an assistant in training camp and ball boy when young. He attended North Catholic High School in Pittsburgh, gaining a spot on the varsity football team in 1951 as a tackle. He was a starter on the line in 1952, before graduating in 1953.

After mulling where to attend college, Rooney's father had him meet Al DeLuca, coach at Saint Vincent College in Latrobe, who had him join the school. He played football there from his freshman year to his senior year and graduated with a bachelor's degree in history in 1957. Following his graduation, he joined the United States Marine Corps Reserve as a private and also acted in several theater stage productions.

== Pittsburgh Steelers ==
Rooney began his employment with his father's team in 1961, starting as a ticket office employee and also spending time as the team's public relations director. In 1965, he was named the team's personnel director, which had him head the scouting department. Previously, the Steelers' NFL draft strategy under Buddy Parker was to trade away most of their picks for veteran players. Under Rooney, the strategy completely changed, with draft selections becoming the team's main way of roster building. Teaming up with head coach Chuck Noll in 1969, Rooney helped produce what Pro Football Hall of Fame voter Vito Stellino described as "the best drafting run in NFL history" over a span of six years. During this time, Pittsburgh selected nine players who would go on to be inducted into the Hall of Fame and signed an additional one (Donnie Shell) as an undrafted free agent. The picks of Hall of Famers Joe Greene in 1969, Mel Blount and Terry Bradshaw in 1970, Jack Ham in 1971, Franco Harris in 1972 and Lynn Swann, John Stallworth, Mike Webster and Jack Lambert in 1974 proved crucial in the success of the team's success in the decade, with them winning Super Bowls IX, X, XIII and XIV in a six-year span.

Despite early success, a dispute arose between Rooney, Noll, and Rooney's brother Dan in the 1980s over the control of the team's drafting. Dan Rooney wrote in his 2008 autobiography, "Art and I disagreed. He and the scouts always felt they should have more control over the draft. I was very firm and said we had to work together ... We tried to settle our differences, but couldn't." The issue resulted with Art Jr. being fired by Dan in January 1987. He later rejoined the team as their vice president, heading the team's real estate division. Rooney Jr., in his book, Ruanaidh, said "To a considerable extent, I felt responsible. I had been the one, after all, who promised to get so many good players into black and gold uniforms that coaches would not be able to mess things up. Our scouting department had not given our coaches the players I had said we'd provide." He noted, though, that it was still "devastating for me and my family," and described being "exiled" to work for the team's real estate department. "It was the end of a way of life for us. All of my friends were in football. Suddenly, I was out."

Rooney still remains the Steelers' vice president as of 2023 and also is on the team's board of directors. He became 16% owner of the team upon the death of his father in 1988, later selling a portion of his ownership to his brother Dan in 2008. The 2008 ownership restructuring showed continued resentment between the brothers, as Art and his other brothers thought that Dan was undervaluing the team. His standing with the Steelers organization improved following Dan's death in 2017, with his nephew Art Rooney II taking over primary ownership.

In his tenure as vice president, Rooney has won an additional two Super Bowls, giving him six Super Bowl rings. He was inducted into the Pittsburgh Steelers Hall of Honor in 2018. He has also been considered for induction to the Pro Football Hall of Fame on several occasions, including being a finalist for the classes of 2023 and 2024. Rooney, alongside Robert Kraft, are the only active NFL team presidents to be six-time Super Bowl champions.

== Personal life ==
Rooney is married and has four children. In 2008, he wrote a book with Roy McHugh, called Ruanaidh (the Gaelic spelling of Rooney), describing the history of his family.
