= Paul Uram =

Personal information
- Born: May 14, 1926; Lyndora, Pennsylvania, U.S.
- Died: October 20, 2017 (aged 91); Butler, Pennsylvania, U.S.

Career information
- High school: Butler Senior (Butler, Pennsylvania)
- College: Slippery Rock State

Career history
- Pittsburgh Steelers (1973–1981) Flexibility coach & kickers coach

Awards and highlights
- 4× Super Bowl champion (IX, X, XIII, XIV); Slippery Rock University Hall of Fame (1986); U.S. Gymnastics Hall of Fame (1974); Butler County Sports Hall of Fame (1969); Slippery Rock All-Time Football Team (1965); Western Pennsylvania Hall of Fame

Paul "Red" Uram (May 14, 1926 – October 20, 2017) was an American gymnastics and flexibility coach. He was a member of the U.S. Gymanstics Hall of Fame and he coached on four Super Bowl-winning teams with the Pittsburgh Steelers of the National Football League (NFL). He was also the author of two books on human movement.

== Early life ==
Uram grew up in Butler, Pennsylvania, where he attended Butler Senior High School. He participated in football and track and field. He went on to play quarterback at Slippery Rock State Teacher's College from which he graduated in 1949.

== Coaching career ==
Uram's coaching career began at Millvale High School in Millvale, Pennsylvania, where he spent six years in the early 1950s coaching football, gymnastics and track and field. His gymnastics teams won 120 straight dual meets during his tenure. He later coached gymnastics at his alma mater, Butler Senior High School, where his teams won 108 straight dual meets and three state championships.

He served as the flexibility and kicking coach for the Pittsburgh Steelers from 1973 through 1981, during which span the team won four Super Bowls. He also worked with the NFL's Baltimore Colts, the Los Angeles Lakers of the NBA, the NHL's Detroit Red Wings and the Pittsburgh Pirates of Major League Baseball.

He is the author of two books on the topic of human movement, flexibility and stretching.

== Bibliography ==
- Refining human movement, self-published: 1971.
- The Complete Stretching Book, Anderson World : 1980. ISBN 978-0-89037-158-9

== Honors ==
Uram was inducted into the U.S. Gymnastics Hall of Fame in 1974, one of only a few high school coaches to be so honored. He was named the quarterback of Slippery Rock University's All-Time football team in 1965 and was inducted into the school's Hall of Fame in 1986. He was elected to the Butler County (Pennsylvania) Sports Hall of Fame in 1969 and is also a member of the Western Pennsylvania Hall of Fame.

March 24, 2009 was designated as "Paul Uram Day" by the borough of Millvale, Pennsylvania.

Pau Uram died October 20, 2017, in Butler, Pennsylvania.
