= Sidney Thornton =

American football player (1954–2023)

- Thornton with the Pittsburgh Steelers

No. 38
- Position: Running back

Personal information
- Born: September 2, 1954; New Orleans, Louisiana, U.S.
- Died: January 29, 2023 (aged 68)
- Listed height: 5 ft 11 in (1.80 m)
- Listed weight: 230 lb (104 kg)

Career information
- High school: Capitol (LA)
- College: Northwestern State
- NFL draft: 1977: 2nd round, 48th overall pick

Career history
- Pittsburgh Steelers (1977–1982); Oklahoma Outlaws (1984)

Awards and highlights
- 2× Super Bowl champion (1979, 1980)

Career NFL statistics
- Rushing attempts: 356
- Rushing yards: 1,512
- Receptions: 46
- Receiving yards: 515
- Total touchdowns: 24
- Stats at Pro Football Reference

Sidney Thornton (September 2, 1954 – January 29, 2023) was an American professional football player who was selected by the Pittsburgh Steelers in the second round (48th overall) of the 1977 NFL draft. A 5'11", 230 lb (100 kg). running back from Northwestern State University in Louisiana, he played in 6 NFL seasons from 1977 to 1982 for the Steelers, winning two Super Bowl titles with the team.

Thornton returned to pro football in 1984, playing one season with the Oklahoma Outlaws and rushing for 288 yards on 101 carries (2.9 yard per carry average). He was second on the team in rushing, finishing behind Ernest Anderson. Anderson rushed for ten more yards during the season than Thornton, however, Thornton led Outlaws in rushing touchdowns, with four.

Thornton died on January 29, 2023, at the age of 68.
