= Steve Courson =

American football player (1955–2005)

No. 77, 72
- Position: Guard

Personal information
- Born: October 1, 1955; Philadelphia, Pennsylvania, U.S.
- Died: November 10, 2005 (aged 50); Farmington, Pennsylvania, U.S.
- Listed height: 6 ft 1 in (1.85 m)
- Listed weight: 274 lb (124 kg)

Career information
- High school: Gettysburg
- College: South Carolina
- NFL draft: 1977: 5th round, 125th overall pick

Career history
- Pittsburgh Steelers (1978–1983); Tampa Bay Buccaneers (1984–1985)

Awards and highlights
- 2× Super Bowl champion (XIII, XIV)

Career NFL statistics
- Games played: 103
- Games started: 73
- Fumble recoveries: 6
- Stats at Pro Football Reference

Stephen Paul Courson (October 1, 1955 – November 10, 2005) was an American professional football guard for the National Football League (NFL)'s Pittsburgh Steelers.

== Early life ==
Steve Courson grew up in Longmeadow, Massachusetts and went to Longmeadow High School . He played on the offense and defense lines and graduated in 1973 in Gettysburg, Pennsylvania. His #71 was retired, and he is the only football player in Gettysburg High School history to receive such an honor.

After graduating from Gettysburg, Courson went on to play on the offensive line at the University of South Carolina.

== Football and steroids ==
During his freshman year at the University of South Carolina, Courson later stated that:

"I got banged around by older, stronger kids. I knew at the time I had to do a lot of work. I knew I had to go on drugs. I wasn't going to be out there just to be out there. I had to be the best. I only did steroids the summer before my sophomore year. My body weight went from 225 to 260 in a month and a half. I didn't need them after that."

He played for the Steelers from 1978 to 1983 and retired in 1985 after two seasons with the Tampa Bay Buccaneers. In 1991, his book False Glory: The Steve Courson Story, about his life in football when he used steroids, was published. He was one of the first American football players to admit to using steroids and harshly criticized them, making nearly 100 speeches a year to high school and college athletes about their dangers. Courson bench pressed 605 pounds (274 kg) but came to feel ashamed and guilty that he really didn't lift the weight – it was the power that steroids gave him. Courson was one of the first players to confess he had been using steroids during his playing career. He suffered from a heart condition which was believed to have been caused by his steroid use.

After his career Courson was effectively blackballed by the NFL because of his outspoken stance on steroids. He had a spell as a high school football coach in the 1990s. Courson's wife Cathy died by suicide.

== Death ==
Courson lived near Pittsburgh for the rest of his life. In November 2005, he died in an accident at his home in Farmington, Pennsylvania. Courson had been cutting down a 44-foot (13 m) tree on his property, but a gust of wind changed the direction of its fall, and he moved into its path while attempting to prevent his dog from being struck. The dog, a black Labrador Retriever, was found alive guarding Courson's body when the tree was removed.

In the months before his death in 2005, Courson wrote a 5,000-word letter expressing disappointment that more players weren't open about their steroid use and saying the league's enormous popularity relies on a "myth" of its players as drug-free heroes. "I believe the NFL is a prisoner to their own public relations myth," Courson said in the letter, which was found on the computer of his western Pennsylvania home after his death. "The level of deception and exploitation that the NFL requires to do business still amazes me." Courson, who became one of professional sports' first steroids whistleblowers by detailing his use in a 1985 Sports Illustrated interview, wrote the letter to a former Pittsburgh Steelers teammate he played with on Super Bowl-winning teams in 1978 and 1979.

Courson is buried in Evergreen Cemetery, in Gettysburg, Pennsylvania.

== See also ==
- Doping in sport
