= Sam Nover =

American sportscaster (1941–2018)

- Born: Samuel A. Nover; March 5, 1941; Detroit, Michigan, U.S.
- Died: December 4, 2018 (aged 77); West Palm Beach, Florida, U.S.
- Education: University of Michigan, Ferris State University, Eastern Michigan University
- Occupation: Sportscaster
- Years active: 1964–2001

Samuel A. Nover (March 5, 1941 – December 4, 2018) was an American sportscaster. His run of 30 years of sportscasting at the same station was one of the longest in Pittsburgh broadcasting history.

== Broadcasting career ==
From 1964 to 1968, Nover worked at radio stations in Charlotte, and Jackson, Michigan. In 1968, he was hired as a sportscaster at WKBD-TV in Detroit, Michigan. He worked at WIIC-TV (later known as WPXI-TV) in Pittsburgh from 1970 until his retirement in 2001. He was the Sports Director and principal sports anchor, with the exception of two years he spent full-time at NBC Sports in New York.

Nover was also the voice of the Pittsburgh Maulers of the United States Football League in their one year of existence and was the voice of the Don King Radio Network for its short period of existence. Nover had the distinction and privilege to do the blow-by-blow of the Heavyweight title fight between Larry Holmes and Michael Spinks with Hall of Fame announcer Don Dunphy as his color commentator. Nover is best remembered for having the last sit-down interview with Roberto Clemente shortly before Clemente's death in 1972. The interview has been excerpted by almost every major television network.

Nover also did television play-by-play for the Pittsburgh Penguins in the 1970s.

=== NBC Sports ===
Nover left WIIC in 1980 and signed a contract with NBC Sports, who hired him to be the boxing commentator at the Moscow Olympics. However, the United States boycotted the games and Nover eventually returned to his old job at WPXI-TV in 1982.

He also worked many venues for NBC Sportsworld, including boxing and was partnered for many years with former Lightweight Champion, Ray "Boom Boom" Mancini and Alexis Arguello.

Nover also did National Football League play-by-play for NBC Sports from the late 1970s until the late 1980s. His color commentator partners included Bob Trumpy, Len Dawson, and Paul Maguire. He also did play-by-play on television for the Pittsburgh Steelers during the preseason from the late 1980s until the late 1990s.

== Personal life ==
Prior to his death, Nover lived in West Palm Beach, Florida, and maintained a residence in Pittsburgh. He has two daughters, Dana and Molly.
