= 1979 Pittsburgh Steelers season =

Sports season

- Owner: Art Rooney
- General manager: Dick Haley
- Head coach: Chuck Noll
- Home stadium: Three Rivers Stadium

Results
- Record: 12–4
- Division place: 1st AFC Central
- Playoffs: Won Divisional Playoffs (vs. Dolphins) 34–14; Won AFC Championship (vs. Oilers) 27–13; Won Super Bowl XIV (vs. Rams) 31–19
- All-Pros: 6: Jack Ham (1st team); Jack Lambert (1st team); Donnie Shell (1st team); John Stallworth (1st team); Mike Webster (1st team); Mel Blount (2nd team)
- Pro Bowlers: 10: CB Mel Blount; QB Terry Bradshaw; DT Joe Greene; DE L. C. Greenwood; LB Jack Ham; RB Franco Harris; LB Jack Lambert; S Donnie Shell; WR John Stallworth; C Mike Webster
- Team MVP: John Stallworth

The 1979 Pittsburgh Steelers season was the franchise's 47th season in the National Football League (NFL). The Steelers successfully defended their Super Bowl Championship from the previous year, despite not improving on their 14–2 record from last year with a 12–4 record. They went on to defeat the Los Angeles Rams in Super Bowl XIV. The Steelers started out to a 4–0 record. Adding to the previous season, the Steelers had won 12 in a row. They finished the regular season at 12–4. In six of those games the opponents were held to a touchdown or less. In the playoffs Pittsburgh defeated Miami, 34–14 and then for the second consecutive season beat Houston 27–13, in the AFC championship game. The Steelers ended the decade by defeating the Los Angeles Rams 31–19 in Super Bowl XIV. Despite them and the San Diego Chargers having 12–4 records, the Chargers were awarded the top seed in the AFC because of their victory over the Steelers.

With the win, and the Pittsburgh Pirates win in the 1979 World Series, Pittsburgh would be the last city to claim Super Bowl and World Series wins in the same year until 1986 when the New York Mets won the World Series in 7 games over the Boston Red Sox, and the New York Giants won Super Bowl XXI 39–20 over the Denver Broncos.

The 1979 Steelers are the only team to win a Super Bowl featuring players that had never played for another NFL team, featuring 40 original draft picks and six undrafted free agents. The 1979 squad would set a franchise record for total points and points-per-game, with both records later broken in 2014. They also remain the only team to win four Super Bowls in six years, as well as the only team with two streaks of consecutive Super Bowl wins.

On February 23, 2007, NFL Network aired America's Game: The Super Bowl Champions, the 1979 Pittsburgh Steelers, with team commentary from John Banaszak, L. C. Greenwood and John Stallworth, and narrated by Ed Harris.

== Offseason ==
=== NFL draft ===
1979 Pittsburgh Steelers draft
Round	Pick	Player	Position	College	Notes
1	28	Greg Hawthorne	Running back	Baylor	
2	56	Zack Valentine	Linebacker	East Carolina	
4	86	Russell Davis	Running back	Michigan	
4	110	Calvin Sweeney	Wide receiver	USC	
5	137	Dwaine Board	Defensive end	North Carolina A&T	
6	157	Bill Murrell	Tight end	Winston-Salem State	
6	161	Dwayne Woodruff	Cornerback	Louisville	
6	165	Matt Bahr	Kicker	Penn State	
7	192	Bruce Kimball	Offensive guard	UMass	
8	220	Tom Graves	Linebacker	Michigan State	
9	248	Rick Kirk	Defensive end	Denison	
10	275	Tod Thompson	Tight end	BYU	
11	303	Charlie Moore	Center	Wichita State	
12	322	Ed Smith	Linebacker	Vanderbilt	
12	330	Mike Almond	Wide receiver	Northwest Louisiana	
Made roster

=== Undrafted free agents ===
1979 undrafted free agents of note
Player	Position	College
Anthony Anderson	Running back	Temple
Ray Butler	Safety	Kansas State
Rich Dansdill	Guard	Missouri
Dave DiCiccio	Safety	Pittsburgh
Larry Douglas	Wide receiver	Southern
Derrick Glasper	Cornerback	Virginia
Frank Goroleski	Wide receiver	Cortland State
Dexter Green	Running back	Iowa State
Gene Johnson	Tight end	Michigan
Duane Jones	Running back	Mississippi Valley State
Carlos Lee	Wide receiver	Concord
Phil Noel	Tackle	Kansas State
Mark Olivari	Linebacker	Tulane
George Small	Guard	North Carolina A&T
Rick Snodgrass	Kicker	Slippery Rock
Johhny Stoutamire	Safety	Livingstone
Jerry Taylor	Wide receiver	Tulsa
Bernard Winters	Defensive end	Syracuse

== Personnel ==
=== Staff / Coaches ===
1979 Pittsburgh Steelers staff
Front office: Chairman of the board – Arthur J. Rooney; President – Daniel M. Rooney; Vice president – John R. McGinley; Vice president – Arthur J. Rooney, Jr.; Public relations director – Ed Kiely; Traveling secretary – James A. Boston; Publicity director – Joe Gordon; Controller – Dennis P. Thimons; Assistant controller – James S. Maund; Director of ticket sales – Geraldine Glenn; Director of player personnel – Dick Haley; Assistant director of player personnel – Bill Nunn; Director of professional scouting – V. Timothy Rooney; Talent scout – West Coast – Bob Schmitz; Pro talent scout – Tom Modrak; College talent scout – Joe Krupa; Head coaches: Head coach – Chuck Noll; Assistant head coach – George Perles; Offensive coaches: Offensive line – Rollie Dotsch; Offensive backfield – Dick Hoak; Receivers – Tom Moore	Defensive coaches: Defensive coordinator – Woody Widenhofer; Defensive backfield – Dick Walker; Strength and conditioning: Strength – Louis Riecke; Flexibility – Paul Uram; Physician, M.D. – Dr. David S. Huber; Physician, M.D. – Dr. Anthony P. Yates; Physician, orthopedic – Dr. Paul B. Steele, Jr.; Dentist – Dr. George P. Boucek; Trainer – Ralph Berlin; Assistant trainer – Robert Milie; Equipment manager – Anthony Parisi; Field manager – Jack Hart; Film director – Bob McCartney; Photographer – Harry Homa

=== Roster ===
1979 Pittsburgh Steelers roster
Quarterbacks (QB): 12 Terry Bradshaw; 15 Mike Kruczek; 18 Cliff Stoudt; Running backs (RB): 33 Anthony Anderson; 20 Rocky Bleier; 32 Franco Harris; 27 Greg Hawthorne; 39 Rick Moser; 38 Sidney Thornton; Wide receivers (WR): 83 Theo Bell; 86 Jim Smith; 82 John Stallworth; 88 Lynn Swann; Tight ends (TE): 89 Bennie Cunningham; 84 Randy Grossman	Offensive linemen (OL): 79 Larry Brown T; 77 Steve Courson G; 57 Sam Davis G; 63 Thom Dornbrook G/C; 55 Jon Kolb T; 72 Gerry Mullins G; 66 Ted Petersen T; 52 Mike Webster C; Defensive linemen (DL): 76 John Banaszak DE; 65 Tom Beasley DE; 67 Gary Dunn DT; 64 Steve Furness DT; 75 Joe Greene DT; 68 L. C. Greenwood DE; 78 Dwight White DE	Linebackers (LB): 56 Robin Cole OLB; 50 Tom Graves MLB; 59 Jack Ham OLB; 58 Jack Lambert MLB; 51 Loren Toews OLB; 54 Zack Valentine OLB; 53 Dennis Winston OLB; Defensive backs (DB): 30 Larry Anderson CB; 47 Mel Blount CB; 29 Ron Johnson CB; 31 Donnie Shell SS; 24 J. T. Thomas FS/CB; 49 Dwayne Woodruff CB; Special teams (ST): 9 Matt Bahr K; 5 Craig Colquitt P	Reserve: 69 Fred Anderson DE (IR); 45 Russell Davis RB (IR); 26 Larry Douglas WR (IR); 62 Willie Fry DE/DT (IR); -- Derrick Glasper CB (IR); 74 Ray Pinney T (IR); 85 Calvin Sweeney WR (PUP); 23 Mike Wagner S (IR); Rookies in italics 45 active, 8 reserve

== Preseason ==
=== Schedule ===
Week	Date	Opponent	Kickoff	TV	Result	Record	Venue	Attendance	NFL.com recap
1	August 4	at Buffalo Bills	6:00 p.m. EDT	WIIC	W 15–7	1–0	Rich Stadium	34,370	
2	August 11	New York Giants	6:00 p.m. EDT	WIIC	W 10–3	2–0	Three Rivers Stadium	46,624	
3	August 17	at New York Jets	8:00 p.m. EDT	WIIC	W 27–14	3–0	Giants Stadium	46,159	
4	August 25	at Dallas Cowboys	9:00 p.m. EDT	NBC	L 14–16	3–1	Texas Stadium	64.543	

Notes:

^{a} All times are EASTERN time.

== Regular season ==
=== Schedule ===
Week	Date	Opponent	Kickoff	TV	Result	Record	Venue	Attendance	Recap
1	September 3	at New England Patriots	9:00 p.m. EDT	ABC	**W** 16–13 (OT)	1–0	Schaefer Stadium	60,978	Recap
2	September 9	**Houston Oilers**	1:00 p.m. EDT	NBC	**W** 38–7	2–0	Three Rivers Stadium	49,792	Recap
3	September 16	at St. Louis Cardinals	4:00 p.m. EDT	NBC	**W** 24–21	3–0	Busch Memorial Stadium	50,416	Recap
4	September 23	Baltimore Colts	1:00 p.m. EDT	NBC	**W** 17–13	4–0	Three Rivers Stadium	49,483	Recap
5	September 30	at Philadelphia Eagles	1:00 p.m. EDT	NBC	**L** 14–17	4–1	Veterans Stadium	70,352	Recap
6	October 7	at **Cleveland Browns**	4:00 p.m. EDT	NBC	**W** 51–35	5–1	Cleveland Municipal Stadium	81,260	Recap
7	October 14	at **Cincinnati Bengals**	1:00 p.m. EDT	NBC	**L** 10–34	5–2	Riverfront Stadium	52,381	Recap
8	October 22	Denver Broncos	9:00 p.m. EDT	ABC	**W** 42–7	6–2	Three Rivers Stadium	49,699	Recap
9	October 28	Dallas Cowboys	1:00 p.m. EST	CBS	**W** 14–3	7–2	Three Rivers Stadium	50,199	Recap
10	November 4	Washington Redskins	1:00 p.m. EST	CBS	**W** 38–7	8–2	Three Rivers Stadium	49,462	Recap
11	November 11	at Kansas City Chiefs	1:00 p.m. EST	NBC	**W** 30–3	9–2	Arrowhead Stadium	70,132	Recap
12	November 18	at San Diego Chargers	4:00 p.m. EST	NBC	**L** 7–35	9–3	San Diego Stadium	52,426	Recap
13	November 25	**Cleveland Browns**	1:00 p.m. EST	NBC	**W** 33–30 (OT)	10–3	Three Rivers Stadium	48,773	Recap
14	December 2	**Cincinnati Bengals**	1:00 p.m. EST	NBC	**W** 37–17	11–3	Three Rivers Stadium	46,521	Recap
15	December 10	at **Houston Oilers**	9:00 p.m. EST	ABC	**L** 17–20	11–4	Astrodome	55,293	Recap
16	December 16	Buffalo Bills	1:00 p.m. EST	NBC	**W** 28–0	12–4	Three Rivers Stadium	48,002	Recap

Note: Intra-division opponents are in bold text.

Notes:

^{a} All times are EASTERN time. (UTC–4 and UTC–5 starting October 28)

=== Game summaries ===
==== Week 1: at New England Patriots ====
Quarter	1	2	3	4	OT	Total
**Steelers**	0	6	0	7	3	**16**
Patriots	7	6	0	0	0	**13**

at Schaefer Stadium, Foxborough, Massachusetts

- Date: Monday, September 3
- Game time: 9:00 pm EDT
- Game weather: 78 °F (26 °C), wind 13 mph (21 km/h)
- Game attendance: 60,978
- Referee: Jim Tunney
- TV announcers (ABC): Frank Gifford (play by play), Don Meredith & Howard Cosell (color commentators)
- Box Score

Game information

**First quarter**

- NE – Russ Francis 4-yard pass from Steve Grogan (John Smith kick) NE 7-0

**Second quarter**

- PIT – Sidney Thornton 2-yard run (kick failed) NE 7-6
- NE – John Smith 31-yard field goal NE 10-6
- NE – John Smith 32-yard field goal NE 13-6

**Fourth quarter**

- PIT – Sidney Thornton 21-yard pass from Terry Bradshaw (Matt Bahr kick) 13-13 tie

**Overtime**

- PIT – Matt Bahr 41-yard field goal PIT 16-13

**Passing**

- PIT: Terry Bradshaw 15/26, 221 yards, TD
- NE: Steve Grogan 11/33, 123 yards, TD, 2 INT

**Rushing**

- PIT: Franco Harris 26 att, 74 yards
- NE: Sam Cunningham 17 att, 62 yards

**Receiving**

- PIT: John Stallworth 5 rec, 95 yards
- NE: Russ Francis 5 rec, 53 yards, TD

==== Week 2: vs. Houston Oilers ====
Quarter	1	2	3	4	Total
Oilers	0	0	0	7	**7**
**Steelers**	7	3	14	14	**38**

at Three Rivers Stadium, Pittsburgh, Pennsylvania

- Date: Sunday, September 9
- Game time: 1:00 pm EDT
- Game weather: 63 °F (17 °C), (Partly Cloudy) wind 6 mph (9.7 km/h)
- Game attendance: 49,792
- Referee: Pat Haggerty
- TV announcers (NBC): Dick Enberg (play by play), Merlin Olsen (color commentator)
- Box Score

Game information

**First quarter**

- PIT – Sidney Thornton 1-yard run (Matt Bahr kick)

**Second quarter**

- PIT – Matt Bahr 45-yard field goal

**Third quarter**

- PIT – Sidney Thornton 16-yard pass from Terry Bradshaw (Matt Bahr kick)
- PIT – Greg Hawthorne 8-yard run (Matt Bahr kick)

**Fourth quarter**

- PIT – Jim Smith 18-yard pass from Terry Bradshaw (Matt Bahr kick)
- PIT – Dirt Winston 41-yard interception return (Matt Bahr kick)
- HOU – Guido Merkins 9-yard pass from Gifford Nielsen (Toni Fritsch kick)

**Passing**

- HOU: Gifford Nielsen 4/11, 41 yards, TD, 2 INT
- PIT: Terry Bradshaw 12/29, 198 yards, 2 TD, 2 INT

**Rushing**

- HOU: Earl Campbell 16 att, 38 yards
- PIT: Franco Harris 14 att, 42 yards

**Receiving**

- HOU: Billy Johnson 2 rec, 32 yards
- PIT: Lynn Swann 5 rec, 95 yards

==== Week 3: at St. Louis Cardinals ====
Quarter	1	2	3	4	Total
**Steelers**	7	0	0	17	**24**
Cardinals	9	6	6	0	**21**

at Busch Memorial Stadium, St. Louis, Missouri

- Date: Sunday, September 16
- Game time: 4:00 pm EDT
- Game weather: 63 °F (17 °C), wind 5 mph (8.0 km/h)
- Game attendance: 50,416
- Referee: Jerry Markbreit
- TV announcers (NBC): Dick Enberg (play by play), Merlin Olsen (color commentator)
- Box Score

Game information

**First quarter**

- STL – Ottis Anderson 12-yard run (kick failed)
- STL – Steve Little 22-yard field goal
- PIT – John Stallworth 18 pass from Terry Bradshaw (Matt Bahr kick)

**Second quarter**

- STL – Theotis Brown 1-yard run (kick failed)

**Third quarter**

- STL – Mike Wood 24-yard field goal
- STL – Mike Wood 27-yard field goal

**Fourth quarter**

- PIT – Rocky Bleier 4-yard run (Matt Bahr kick)
- PIT – Bennie Cunningham 5-yard pass from Terry Bradshaw (Matt Bahr kick)
- PIT – Matt Bahr 20-yard field goal

**Passing**

- PIT – Terry Bradshaw 14/31, 206 yards, 2 TD, 2 INT
- STL – Jim Hart 12/24, 132 yards

**Rushing**

- PIT – Rocky Bleier 13 att, 73 yards, TD
- STL – Theotis Brown 14 att, 69 yards, TD

**Receiving**

- PIT – John Stallworth 6 rec, 80 yards, TD
- STL – Mel Gray 1 rec, 48 yards

==== Week 4: vs. Baltimore Colts ====
Quarter	1	2	3	4	Total
Colts	10	0	3	0	**13**
**Steelers**	7	3	0	7	**17**

at Three Rivers Stadium, Pittsburgh, Pennsylvania

- Date: Sunday, September 23
- Game time: 1:00 pm EDT
- Game weather: 66 °F (19 °C), (Sunny) wind 10 mph (16 km/h)
- Game attendance: 49,483
- Referee: Gordon McCarter
- TV announcers (NBC): Sam Nover (play by play), Bob Trumpy (color commentator)
- Box Score

Game information

**First quarter**

- BAL – Steve Mike-Mayer 27-yard field goal
- PIT – John Stallworth 47-yard pass from Terry Bradshaw (Matt Bahr kick)
- BAL – Roger Carr 36-yard pass from Greg Landry (Steve Mike-Mayer kick)

**Second quarter**

- PIT – Matt Bahr 25-yard field goal

**Third quarter**

- BAL – Steve Mike-Mayer 24-yard field goal

**Fourth quarter**

- PIT – Bennie Cunningham 28-yard pass from Terry Bradshaw (Matt Bahr kick)

**Passing**

- BAL – Greg Landry 17/34, 195 yards, TD, 2 INT
- PIT – Terry Bradshaw 19/29, 249 yards, 2 TD, 2 INT

**Rushing**

- BAL – Joe Washington 21 att, 65 yards
- PIT – Sidney Thornton 13 att, 129 yards

**Receiving**

- BAL – Roger Carr 4 rec, 68 yards, TD
- PIT – John Stallworth 4 rec, 83 yards, TD

==== Week 5: at Philadelphia Eagles ====
Quarter	1	2	3	4	Total
Steelers	0	7	0	7	**14**
**Eagles**	0	7	10	0	**17**

at Veterans Stadium, Philadelphia

- Date: Sunday, September 30
- Game time: 1:00 pm EDT
- Game weather: 68 °F (20 °C), wind 12 mph (19 km/h)
- Game attendance: 70,352
- Referee: Cal Lepore
- TV announcers (NBC): Charlie Jones (play by play), Len Dawson (color commentator)
- Box Score

Game information

**Second quarter**

- PIT – Sidney Thornton 7-yard run (Matt Bahr kick)
- PHI – Leroy Harris 1-yard run (Tony Franklin kick)

**Third quarter**

- PHI – Tony Franklin 48-yard field goal
- PHI – Wilbert Montgomery 1-yard run (Tony Franklin kick)

**Fourth quarter**

- PIT – John Stallworth 37-yard pass from Terry Bradshaw (Matt Bahr kick)

**Passing**

- PIT – Terry Bradshaw 12/26, 176 yards, TD, 2 INT
- PHI – Ron Jaworski 11/20, 158 yards, 2 INT

**Rushing**

- PIT – Sidney Thornton 16 att, 88 yards, TD
- PHI – Wilbert Montgomery 28 att, 98 yards, TD

**Receiving**

- PIT – John Stallworth 5 rec, 102 yards, TD
- PHI – Keith Krepfle 4 rec, 95 yards

==== Week 6: at Cleveland Browns ====
Quarter	1	2	3	4	Total
**Steelers**	21	9	7	14	**51**
Browns	0	14	7	14	**35**

at Cleveland Municipal Stadium, Cleveland, Ohio

- Date: Sunday, October 7
- Game time: 4:00 pm EDT
- Game weather: 48 °F (9 °C), wind 17 mph (27 km/h)
- Game attendance: 81,260
- Referee: Jim Tunney
- TV announcers (NBC): Don Criqui (play by play), John Brodie (color commentator)
- Box Score

Game information

**First quarter**

- PIT – Bennie Cunningham 7-yard pass from Terry Bradshaw (Matt Bahr kick)
- PIT – Sidney Thornton 10-yard pass from Terry Bradshaw (Matt Bahr kick)
- PIT – Franco Harris 71-yard run (Matt Bahr kick)

**Second quarter**

- PIT – Jim Smith 14-yard pass from Terry Bradshaw (kick failed)
- CLE – Reggie Rucker 32-yard pass from Brian Sipe (Don Cockroft kick)
- CLE – Ozzie Newsome 18-yard pass from Brian Sipe (Don Cockroft kick)
- PIT – Matt Bahr 42-yard field goal

**Third quarter**

- PIT – Franco Harris 25-yard run (Matt Bahr kick)
- CLE – Calvin Hill 14-yard pass from Brian Sipe (Don Cockroft kick)

**Fourth quarter**

- PIT – Rocky Bleier 70-yard run (Matt Bahr kick)
- CLE – Dave Logan 30-yard pass from Brian Sipe (Don Cockroft kick)
- CLE – Dave Logan 13-yard pass from Brian Sipe (Don Cockroft kick)
- PIT – Sidney Thornton 1-yard run (Matt Bahr kick)

**Passing**

- PIT – Terry Bradshaw 12/21, 161 yards, 3 TD
- CLE – Brian Sipe 22/41, 351 yards, 5 TD, 3 INT

**Rushing**

- PIT – Franco Harris 19 att, 153 yards, 2 TD
- CLE – Mike Pruitt 15 att, 73 yards

**Receiving**

- PIT – John Stallworth 4 rec, 96 yards, TD
- CLE – Ozzie Newsome 6 rec, 97 yards, TD

==== Week 7: at Cincinnati Bengals ====
Quarter	1	2	3	4	Total
Steelers	3	0	0	7	**10**
**Bengals**	7	20	0	7	**34**

at Riverfront Stadium, Cincinnati

- Date: Sunday, October 14
- Game time: 1:00 pm EDT
- Game weather: 40 °F (4 °C), wind 7 mph (11 km/h)
- Game attendance: 52,381
- Referee: Ben Dreith
- TV announcers (NBC): Sam Nover (play by play), Bob Trumpy (color commentator)
- Box Score

Game information

**First quarter**

- PIT – Matt Bahr 46-yard field goal
- CIN – Dan Ross 7-yard pass from Ken Anderson (Chris Bahr kick)

**Second quarter**

- CIN – Pete Johnson 1-yard run (kick failed)
- CIN – Howard Kurnick 12-yard fumble return (Chris Bahr kick)
- CIN – Jim LeClair 27-yard fumble return (Chris Bahr kick)

**Fourth quarter**

- CIN – Rick Walker 14-yard pass from Ken Anderson (Chris Bahr kick)
- PIT – John Stallworth 33-yard pass from Terry Bradshaw (Matt Bahr kick)

**Passing**

- PIT – Terry Bradshaw 21/40, 275 yards, TD, 2 INT
- CIN – Ken Anderson 9/20, 120 yards, 2 TD, 2 INT

**Rushing**

- PIT – Franco Harris 9 att, 45 yards
- CIN – Charles Alexander 19 att, 91 yards

**Receiving**

- PIT – John Stallworth 6 rec, 126 yards, TD
- CIN – Archie Griffin 4 rec, 65 yards

==== Week 8: vs. Denver Broncos ====
Quarter	1	2	3	4	Total
Broncos	7	0	0	0	**7**
**Steelers**	7	21	0	14	**42**

at Three Rivers Stadium, Pittsburgh, Pennsylvania

- Date: Monday, October 22
- Game time: 9:00 pm EDT
- Game weather: 71 °F (22 °C), (Clear) wind 9 mph (14 km/h)
- Game attendance: 49,699
- Referee: Pat Haggerty
- TV announcers (ABC): Frank Gifford (play by play), Don Meredith & Howard Cosell (color commentators)
- Box Score

Game information

**First quarter**

- PIT – Lynn Swann 11-yard pass from Terry Bradshaw (Matt Bahr kick)
- DEN – Haven Moses 64-yard pass from Craig Morton (Jim Turner kick)

**Second quarter**

- PIT – Franco Harris 2-yard run (Matt Bahr kick)
- PIT – Franco Harris 4-yard run (Matt Bahr kick)
- PIT – Sidney Thornton 1-yard run (Matt Bahr kick)

**Fourth quarter**

- PIT – Sidney Thornton 17-yard pass from Terry Bradshaw (Matt Bahr kick)
- PIT – Anthony Anderson 10-yard run (Matt Bahr kick)

**Passing**

- DEN – Craig Morton 16/31, 261 yards, TD, INT
- PIT – Terry Bradshaw 18/24, 267 yards, 2 TD, INT

**Rushing**

- DEN – Jon Keyworth 4 att, 29 yards
- PIT – Franco Harris 17 att, 121 yards, 2 TD

**Receiving**

- DEN – Haven Moses 5 rec, 133 yards, TD
- PIT – Lynn Swann 2 rec, 76 yards, TD

==== Week 9: vs. Dallas Cowboys ====
Quarter	1	2	3	4	Total
Cowboys	0	3	0	0	**3**
**Steelers**	0	7	7	0	**14**

at Three Rivers Stadium, Pittsburgh, Pennsylvania

- Date: Sunday, October 28
- Game time: 1:00 pm EST
- Game weather: 59 °F (15 °C), (Partly Cloudy) wind 12 mph (19 km/h)
- Game attendance: 50,199
- Referee: Dick Jorgensen
- TV announcers (CBS): Pat Summerall (play by play), Tom Brookshier (color commentator)
- Box Score

Game information

**Second quarter**

- PIT – Franco Harris 1-yard run (Matt Bahr kick)
- DAL – Rafael Septién 32-yard field goal

**Third quarter**

- PIT – Franco Harris 48-yard run (Matt Bahr kick)

**Passing**

- DAL – Roger Staubach 11/25, 113 yards
- PIT – Terry Bradshaw 11/25, 126 yards

**Rushing**

- DAL – Tony Dorsett 19 att, 73 yards
- PIT – Franco Harris 18 att, 102 yards, 2 TD

**Receiving**

- DAL – Drew Pearson 5 rec, 89 yards
- PIT – John Stallworth 7 rec, 98 yards

==== Week 10: vs. Washington Redskins ====
Quarter	1	2	3	4	Total
Redskins	0	7	0	0	**7**
**Steelers**	7	17	7	7	**38**

at Three Rivers Stadium, Pittsburgh, Pennsylvania

- Date: Sunday, November 4
- Game time: 1:00 pm EST
- Game weather: 53 °F (12 °C), (Sunny) wind 7 mph (11 km/h)
- Game attendance: 49,462
- Referee: Gordon McCarter
- TV announcers (CBS): Curt Gowdy (play by play), Hank Stram (color commentator)
- Box Score

Game information

**First quarter**

- PIT – John Stallworth 11-yard pass from Terry Bradshaw (Matt Bahr kick)

**Second quarter**

- WAS – John Riggins 4-yard run (Mark Moseley kick)
- PIT – Matt Bahr 21-yard field goal
- PIT – Bennie Cunningham 16-yard pass from Terry Bradshaw (Matt Bahr kick)
- PIT – Randy Grossman 4-yard pass from Terry Bradshaw (Matt Bahr kick)

**Third quarter**

- PIT – John Stallworth 65-yard pass from Terry Bradshaw (Matt Bahr kick)

**Fourth quarter**

- PIT – Rick Moser 2-yard run (Matt Bahr kick)

**Passing**

- WAS – Joe Theismann 14/31, 147 yards, INT
- PIT – Terry Bradshaw 15/27, 311 yards, 4 TD, INT

**Rushing**

- WAS – John Riggins 13 att, 56 yards, TD
- PIT – Franco Harris 15 att, 62 yards

**Receiving**

- WAS – Danny Buggs 3 rec, 37 yards
- PIT – John Stallworth 6 rec, 126 yards, 2 TD

In that game. Franco Harris became the 5th man to rush for 8,000 career rushing yards, and it was also Chuck Noll's 95th win as a head coach, the same number that Vince Lombardi won during his career.

==== Week 11: at Kansas City Chiefs ====
Quarter	1	2	3	4	Total
**Steelers**	10	10	0	10	**30**
Chiefs	0	0	3	0	**3**

at Arrowhead Stadium, Kansas City, Missouri

- Date: Sunday, November 11
- Game time: 1:00 pm EST
- Game weather: 34 °F (1 °C), wind 15 mph (24 km/h)
- Game attendance: 70,132
- Referee: Fred Wyant
- TV announcers (NBC): Don Criqui (play by play), John Brodie (color commentator)
- Box Score

Game information

**First quarter**

- PIT – John Stallworth 26-yard pass from Terry Bradshaw (Matt Bahr kick)
- PIT – Matt Bahr 31-yard field goal

**Second quarter**

- PIT – Lynn Swann 16-yard pass from Terry Bradshaw (Matt Bahr kick)
- PIT – Matt Bahr 20-yard field goal

**Third quarter**

- KC – Jan Stenerud 42-yard field goal

**Fourth quarter**

- PIT – Matt Bahr 37-yard field goal
- PIT – Larry Brown 1-yard pass from Terry Bradshaw (Matt Bahr kick)

**Passing**

- PIT – Terry Bradshaw 17/29, 232 yards, 3 TD, 2 INT
- KC – Steve Fuller 9/20, 89 yards, INT

**Rushing**

- PIT – Franco Harris 20 att, 68 yards
- KC – Mike Williams 6 att, 19 yards

**Receiving**

- PIT – John Stallworth 4 rec, 88 yards, TD
- KC – J.T. Smith 3 rec, 47 yards

==== Week 12: at San Diego Chargers ====
Quarter	1	2	3	4	Total
Steelers	0	0	7	0	**7**
**Chargers**	7	14	7	7	**35**

at San Diego Stadium, San Diego, California

- Date: Sunday, November 18
- Game time: 4:00 pm EST
- Game weather: 63 °F (17 °C), wind 9 mph (14 km/h)
- Game attendance: 51,910
- Referee: Red Cashion
- TV announcers (NBC): Dick Enberg (play by play), Merlin Olsen (color commentator)
- Box Score

Game information

**First quarter**

- SD – John Jefferson 16-yard pass from Dan Fouts (Mike Wood kick)

**Second quarter**

- SD – Bob Klein 6-yard pass from Dan Fouts (Mike Wood kick)
- SD – Bo Matthews 2-yard run (Mike Wood kick)

**Third quarter**

- PIT – Rocky Bleier 2-yard run (Matt Bahr kick)
- SD – Woodrow Lowe 77-yard interception return (Mike Wood kick)

**Fourth quarter**

- SD – Hank Bauer 2-yard run (Mike Wood kick)

**Passing**

- PIT – Terry Bradshaw 18/36, 153 yards, 5 INT
- SD – Dan Fouts 11/24, 137 yards, 2 TD, 2 INT

**Rushing**

- PIT – Franco Harris 20 att, 44 yards
- SD – Mike Thomas 13 att, 53 yards

**Receiving**

- PIT – John Stallworth 4 rec, 55 yards
- SD – John Jefferson 5 rec, 106 yards, TD

==== Week 13: vs. Cleveland Browns ====
Quarter	1	2	3	4	OT	Total
Browns	10	10	7	3	0	**30**
**Steelers**	3	10	0	17	3	**33**

at Three Rivers Stadium, Pittsburgh, Pennsylvania

- Date: Sunday, November 25
- Game time: 1:00 pm EST
- Game weather: 62 °F (17 °C), (Cloudy) wind 6 mph (9.7 km/h)
- Game attendance: 48,773
- Referee: Ben Dreith
- TV announcers (NBC): Charlie Jones (play by play), Len Dawson (color commentator)
- Box Score

Game information

**First quarter**

- CLE – Ozzie Newsome 21-yard pass from Brian Sipe (Don Cockroft kick)
- CLE – Don Cockroft 20-yard field goal
- PIT – Matt Bahr 45-yard field goal

**Second quarter**

- CLE – Don Cockroft 32-yard field goal
- PIT – Matt Bahr 34-yard field goal
- CLE – Dave Logan 16-yard pass from Brian Sipe (Don Cockroft kick)
- PIT – Franco Harris 2-yard pass from Terry Bradshaw (Matt Bahr kick)

**Third quarter**

- CLE – Calvin Hill 3-yard pass from Brian Sipe (Don Cockroft kick)

**Fourth quarter**

- PIT – Franco Harris 1-yard run (Matt Bahr kick)
- CLE – Don Cockroft 40-yard field goal
- PIT – Franco Harris 1-yard run (Matt Bahr kick)
- PIT – Matt Bahr 21-yard field goal

**Overtime**

- PIT – Matt Bahr 37-yard field goal

**Passing**

- CLE – Brian Sipe 23/38, 333 yards, 3 TD, INT
- PIT – Terry Bradshaw 30/44, 364 yards, TD, INT

**Rushing**

- CLE – Brian Sipe 3 att, 30 yards
- PIT – Franco Harris 32 att, 151 yards, 2 TD

**Receiving**

- CLE – Dave Logan 7 rec, 135 yards, TD
- PIT – Franco Harris 9 rec, 81 yards, TD

==== Week 14: vs. Cincinnati Bengals ====
Quarter	1	2	3	4	Total
Bengals	0	10	7	0	**17**
**Steelers**	10	14	10	3	**37**

at Three Rivers Stadium, Pittsburgh, Pennsylvania

- Date: Sunday, December 2
- Game time: 1:00 pm EST
- Game weather: 33 °F (1 °C), (Cloudy) wind 12 mph (19 km/h)
- Game attendance: 46,251
- Referee: Jim Tunney
- TV announcers (NBC): Sam Nover (play by play), Bob Trumpy (color commentator)
- Box Score

Game information

**First quarter**

- PIT – Matt Bahr 43-yard field goal
- PIT – Lynn Swann 58-yard pass from Terry Bradshaw (Matt Bahr kick)

**Second quarter**

- PIT – Franco Harris 1-yard run (Matt Bahr kick)
- CIN – Chris Bahr 46-yard field goal
- PIT – Rocky Bleier 1-yard run (Matt Bahr kick)
- CIN – Isaac Curtis 29-yard pass from Ken Anderson (Chris Bahr kick)

**Third quarter**

- CIN – Isaac Curtis 32-yard pass from Ken Anderson (Chris Bahr kick)
- PIT – Lynn Swann 42-yard pass from Terry Bradshaw (Matt Bahr kick)
- PIT – Matt Bahr 23-yard field goal

**Fourth quarter**

- PIT – Matt Bahr 32-yard field goal

**Passing**

- CIN – Ken Anderson 20/36, 258 yards, 2 TD
- PIT – Terry Bradshaw 17/29, 339 yards, 2 TD, INT

**Rushing**

- CIN – Pete Johnson 18 att, 51 yards
- PIT – Franco Harris 20 att, 92 yards, TD

**Receiving**

- CIN – Isaac Curtis 5 rec, 119 yards, 2 TD
- PIT – Lynn Swann 5 rec, 192 yards, 2 TD

==== Week 15: at Houston Oilers ====
Quarter	1	2	3	4	Total
Steelers	0	0	3	14	**17**
**Oilers**	0	7	3	10	**20**

at Astrodome, Houston, Texas

- Date: Monday, December 10
- Game time: 9:00 pm EST
- Game weather: Dome
- Game attendance: 55,923
- Referee: Jerry Markbreit
- TV announcers (ABC): Frank Gifford (play by play), Fran Tarkenton & Howard Cosell (color commentators)
- Box Score

Game information

**Second quarter**

- HOU – Ken Burrough 25 pass from Dan Pastorini (Toni Fritsch kick)

**Third quarter**

- PIT – Matt Bahr 37-yard field goal
- HOU – Toni Fritsch 24-yard field goal

**Fourth quarter**

- HOU – Toni Fritsch 34-yard field goal
- PIT – Lynn Swann 9-yard run (Matt Bahr kick)
- HOU – Rob Carpenter 4-yard run (Toni Fritsch kick)
- PIT – John Stallworth 34-yard pass from Terry Bradshaw (Matt Bahr kick)

**Passing**

- PIT – Terry Bradshaw 14/29, 137 yards, TD, 2 INT
- HOU – Dan Pastorini 10/16, 170 yards, TD

**Rushing**

- PIT – Franco Harris 12 att, 59 yards
- HOU – Earl Campbell 33 att, 109 yards

**Receiving**

- PIT – Bennie Cunningham 2 rec, 67 yards
- HOU – Ken Burrough 3 rec, 48 yards, TD

==== Week 16: vs. Buffalo Bills ====
Quarter	1	2	3	4	Total
Bills	0	0	0	0	**0**
**Steelers**	7	7	7	7	**28**

at Three Rivers Stadium, Pittsburgh, Pennsylvania

- Date: Sunday, December 16
- Game time: 1:00 pm EST
- Game weather: 48 °F (9 °C), (Cloudy) wind 13 mph (21 km/h)
- Game attendance: 48,002
- Referee: Fred Silva
- TV announcers (NBC): Don Criqui (play by play), John Brodie (color commentator)
- Box Score

Game information

**First quarter**

- PIT – Lynn Swann 20-yard pass from Terry Bradshaw (Matt Bahr kick)

**Second quarter**

- PIT – Franco Harris 1-yard run (Matt Bahr kick)

**Third quarter**

- PIT – Sidney Thornton 8-yard run (Matt Bahr kick)

**Fourth quarter**

- PIT – Franco Harris 11-yard run (Matt Bahr kick)

**Passing**

- BUF – Joe Ferguson 11/31, 103 yards, 2 INT
- PIT – Terry Bradshaw 14/27, 209 yards, TD, 2 INT

**Rushing**

- BUF – Mike Collier 16 att, 49 yards
- PIT – Franco Harris 21 att, 100 yards, 2 TD

**Receiving**

- BUF – Jerry Butler 3 rec, 54 yards
- PIT – Lynn Swann 3 rec, 61 yards, TD

=== Standings ===
AFC Central
	W	L	T	PCT	DIV	CONF	PF	PA	STK
^{(2)} Pittsburgh Steelers	12	4	0	.750	4–2	9–3	416	262	W1
^{(4)} Houston Oilers	11	5	0	.688	4–2	9–3	362	331	L1
Cleveland Browns	9	7	0	.563	2–4	6–6	359	352	L2
Cincinnati Bengals	4	12	0	.250	2–4	2–10	337	421	W1

== Stats ==
Passing

Rushing

Receiving

Kicking

Punting

Kick Return

Punt Return

Defense & Fumbles

Scoring Summary

Team

Quarter-by-quarter

Quarter-by-quarter
	1	2	3	4	OT	T
Steelers	89	114	62	145	6	416
Opponents	57	104	53	48	0	262

== Postseason ==
=== Schedule ===
Round	Date	Opponent	Kickoff	TV	Result	Record	Game Site	Attendance	Recap
Wild Card	First Round Bye								
Divisional	December 30	Miami Dolphins (3)	12:30 p.m. EST	NBC	W 34–14	1–0	Three Rivers Stadium	50,214	Recap
AFC Championship	January 6	Houston Oilers (4)	1:00 p.m. EST	NBC	W 27–13	2–0	Three Rivers Stadium	50,475	Recap
Super Bowl XIV	January 20	Los Angeles Rams (N3)	6:00 p.m. EST	CBS	W 31–19	3–0	Rose Bowl	103,985	Recap

Notes:

^{a} All times are EASTERN time.

=== Game summaries ===
==== AFC Divisional Playoff: vs. Miami Dolphins ====
Quarter	1	2	3	4	Total
Dolphins	0	0	7	7	14
Steelers	20	0	7	7	34

at Three Rivers Stadium, Pittsburgh, Pennsylvania

- Date: Sunday, December 30
- Game time: 12:30 pm EST
- Game weather: 28 °F (−2 °C) (Fog)
- Game attendance: 50,214
- Referee: Cal Lepore
- TV announcers (NBC): Don Criqui (play by play), John Brodie (color commentator)
- Box Score

Game information

First quarter

- PIT – Sidney Thornton 1-yard run (Matt Bahr kick)
- PIT – John Stallworth 17-yard pass from Bradshaw (kick blocked)
- PIT – Lynn Swann 20-yard pass from Terry Bradshaw (Matt Bahr kick)

Third quarter

- MIA – Duriel Harris 7-yard pass from Bob Griese (Uwe von Schamann kick)
- PIT – Rocky Bleier 1-yard run (Matt Bahr kick)

Fourth quarter

- PIT – Franco Harris 5-yard run (Bahr kick)
- MIA – Larry Csonka 1-yard run (Uwe von Schamann kick)

Passing

- MIA – Don Strock 8/14, 125 yards, INT
- PIT – Terry Bradshaw 21/31, 230 yards, 2 TD

Rushing

- MIA – Larry Csonka 10 att, 20 yards, TD
- PIT – Franco Harris 21 att, 83 yards, TD

Receiving

- MIA – Nat Moore 5 rec, 93 yards
- PIT – John Stallworth 6 rec, 86 yards, TD

==== AFC Championship: vs. Houston Oilers ====
Quarter	1	2	3	4	Total
Oilers	7	3	0	3	13
Steelers	3	14	0	10	27

at Three Rivers Stadium, Pittsburgh, Pennsylvania

- Date: Sunday, January 6
- Game time: 1:00 pm EST
- Game weather: 27 °F (−3 °C), (Light Freezing Rain) wind 18 mph (29 km/h)
- Game attendance: 50,475
- Referee: Jim Tunney
- TV announcers (NBC): Dick Enberg (play by play), Merlin Olsen (color commentators)
- Box Score

Game information

First quarter

- HOU – Vernon Perry 75-yard interception return (Toni Fritsch kick)
- PIT – Matt Bahr 21-yard field goal

Second quarter

- HOU – Toni Fritsch 21-yard field goal
- PIT – Bennie Cunningham 16-yard pass from Terry Bradshaw (Matt Bahr kick)
- PIT – John Stallworth 20-yard pass from Terry Bradshaw (Matt Bahr kick)

Fourth quarter

- HOU – Toni Fritsch 23-yard field goal
- PIT – Matt Bahr 39-yard field goal
- PIT – Rocky Bleier 4-yard run (Matt Bahr kick)

Passing

- HOU – Dan Pastorini 19/28, 203 yards, INT
- PIT – Terry Bradshaw 18/30, 219 yards, 2 TD, INT

Rushing

- HOU – Earl Campbell 17 att, 15 yards
- PIT – Franco Harris 21 att, 85 yards

Receiving

- HOU – Tim Wilson 7 rec, 60 yards
- PIT – Lynn Swann 4 rec, 64 yards

==== Super Bowl XIV: vs. Los Angeles Rams ====
Quarter	1	2	3	4	Total
Rams	7	6	6	0	19
Steelers	3	7	7	14	31

at Rose Bowl Stadium, Pasadena, California

- Date: Sunday, January 20
- Game time: 6:15 pm EST
- Game weather: 67 °F (19 °C) (Sunny), wind 17 mph (27 km/h)
- Game attendance: 103,985
- Referee: Fred Silva
- TV announcers (CBS): Pat Summerall (play by play), Tom Brookshier (color commentator)
- Box Score

Game information

First quarter

- PIT – Matt Bahr 41-yard field goal
- LA – Cullen Bryant 1-yard run (Frank Corral kick)

Second quarter

- PIT – Franco Harris 1-yard run (Matt Bahr kick)
- LA – Frank Corral 31-yard field goal
- LA – Frank Corral 45-yard field goal

Third quarter

- PIT – Lynn Swann 47-yard pass from Terry Bradshaw (Matt Bahr kick)
- LA – Ron Smith 24-yard pass from Lawrence McCutcheon (kick failed)

Fourth quarter

- PIT – John Stallworth 73-yard pass from Terry Bradshaw (Matt Bahr kick)
- PIT – Franco Harris 1-yard run (Matt Bahr kick)

Passing

- LA – Vince Ferragamo 15/25, 212 yards, INT
- PIT – Terry Bradshaw 14/21, 309 yards, 2 TD, 3 INT

Rushing

- LA – Wendell Tyler 17 att, 60 yards
- PIT – Franco Harris 20 att, 46 yards, 2 TD

Receiving

- LA – Billy Waddy 3 rec, 75 yards
- PIT – John Stallworth 3 rec, 121 yards, TD

== Statistics ==
=== Passing ===
Player	Comp	Att	Yards	TD	INT
Terry Bradshaw	259	472	3,724	26	25

=== Rushing ===
Player	Att	Yards	TD
Franco Harris	267	1,186	11
Sidney Thornton	118	585	6
Rocky Bleier	92	434	4
Terry Bradshaw	21	83	
Lynn Swann	1	9	

=== Receiving ===
Player	Rec	Yards	TD
John Stallworth	70	1,183	8
Lynn Swann	41	808	5
Bennie Cunningham	36	512	4
Franco Harris	36	291	1
Rocky Bleier	31	277	
Sidney Thornton	16	231	4

== Honors and awards ==
- Terry Bradshaw, Super Bowl MVP
