= 1980 Pittsburgh Steelers season =

Sports season

- Owner: Art Rooney
- General manager: Dick Haley
- Head coach: Chuck Noll
- Home stadium: Three Rivers Stadium

Results
- Record: 9–7
- Division place: 3rd AFC Central
- Playoffs: Did not qualify
- All-Pros: 3: Jack Lambert (1st team); Donnie Shell (1st team); Mike Webster (1st team)
- Pro Bowlers: 5: LB Jack Ham; RB Franco Harris; LB Jack Lambert; S Donnie Shell; C Mike Webster
- Team MVP: Donnie Shell

The 1980 Pittsburgh Steelers season was the franchise's 48th season in the National Football League.

The Steelers struggled for the first time in many years. The aging defense was not as effective as it had been in the 1978 and '79 seasons, falling from 2nd to 15th in yards allowed. The Steelers also surrendered 313 points, ranked 15th in the league, compared to 262 points (5th in the league) the previous season. The Pittsburgh defense only garnered 18 quarterback sacks.

The offense was still plagued with 42 total turnovers, but ranking 6th in total offense, and scoring 352 points.

Despite the team's troubles, the Steelers could have again obtained home-field advantage throughout the playoffs had they not lost several close games, including games against Cincinnati and Cleveland in which they lost despite having large leads in the fourth quarter. Pittsburgh remained in the playoff hunt until a 28–13 loss to Buffalo in week 12, and then a 6–0 loss to Houston effectively eliminated Pittsburgh from the postseason.

To many, these two losses marked the end of the Steeler Dynasty. Several key players retired after the 1980 season and the team was never the same again. The 1980 season was the first in which the Steelers did not qualify for the playoffs since 1971.

== Offseason ==
=== NFL draft ===
1980 Pittsburgh Steelers draft
Round	Pick	Player	Position	College	Notes
1	28	Mark Malone	Quarterback	Arizona State	
2	35	Bob Kohrs	Linebacker	Arizona State	Played with Steelers from 1981–1985
2	56	John Goodman	Defensive end	Oklahoma	
3	83	Ray Sydnor	Tight end	Wisconsin	
4	110	Bill Hurley	Defensive back	Syracuse	
5	138	Craig Wolfley	Guard	Syracuse	
6	165	Tunch Ilkin *	Tackle	Indiana State	
7	193	Nate Johnson	Wide receiver	Hillsdale	
8	221	Ted Walton	Defensive back	UConn	
9	249	Ron McCall	Wide receiver	Arkansas–Pine Bluff	
10	250	Woodrow Wilson	Defensive back	NC State	
10	277	Ken Fritz	Guard	Ohio State	
11	305	Frank Pollard	Running back	Baylor	
12	306	Charles Vaclavik	Defensive back	Texas	
12	333	Tyrone McGriff	Guard	Florida A&M	
Made roster * Made at least one Pro Bowl during career

=== Undrafted free agents ===
1980 undrafted free agents of note
Player	Position	College
Bill Dudash	Defensive end	Kent State
James Ferranti	Wide receiver	Youngstown State
Gerry Gluscic	Linebacker	Indiana State
Gary Gomolak	Tight end	Virginia
Keevan Grimmett	Defensive tackle	Purdue
Randy Harrison	Safety	Notre Dame
Rick Jones	Guard	Catawba
Tracy King	Wide receiver	Wittenberg
Chuck Lazar	Defensive back	Allegheny
Mark Mattingly	Defensive end	Southwest Texas State
Ned Parrish	Linebacker	Lenoir–Rhyne
Bill Ring	Running back	BYU
Michael Schwartz	Defensive back	Iowa State
David Shea	Defensive back	Lafayette
Tim Singleton	Defensive end	South Carolina
Kevin Statzer	Defensive back	Youngstown State
Ricardo Volley	Running back	Ohio State
Norris Williams	Center	Arizona State

== Personnel ==
=== Staff / Coaches ===
1980 Pittsburgh Steelers staff
Front office: Chairman of the Board – Arthur J. Rooney; President – Daniel M. Rooney; Vice President – John R. McGinley; Vice President – Arthur J. Rooney, Jr.; Public Relations Director – Ed Kiely; Traveling Secretary – James A. Boston; Publicity Director – Joe Gordon; Assistant Publicity Director – John Evenson; Controller – Dennis P. Thimons; Assistant Controller – James S. Maund; Director of Ticket Sales – Geraldine Glenn; Director of Player Personnel – Dick Haley; Assistant Director of Player Personnel – William Nunn, Jr.; Pro Talent Scout – Tom Modrak; Talent Scout – West Coast – Bob Schmitz; College Talent Scout – Joe Krupa; Head coaches: Head Coach – Chuck Noll; Assistant Head Coach – George Perles; Offensive coaches: Offensive Line – Rollie Dotsch; Offensive Backfield – Dick Hoak; Receivers – Tom Moore	Defensive coaches: Defensive Coordinator – Woody Widenhofer; Defensive Backfield – Dick Walker; Strength and conditioning: Paul Uram *Mike Walker *Physician, M.D. – Dr. David S. Huber; Physician, M.D. – Dr. Anthony P. Yates; Physician, Orthopedic – Dr. Paul B. Steele, Jr.; Dentist – Dr. George P. Boucek; Ophthalmologist – Dr. Phillip Buzzelli; Trainer – Ralph Berlin; Assistant Trainer – Robert Osborne; Equipment Manager – Anthony Parisi; Field Manager – Bruce J. Lowry; Film Director – Bob McCartney; Photographer – Harry Homa

=== Roster ===
1980 Pittsburgh Steelers roster
Quarterbacks (QB): 12 Terry Bradshaw; 16 Mark Malone WR; 18 Cliff Stoudt; Running backs (RB): 20 Rocky Bleier; 45 Russell Davis; 32 Franco Harris; 27 Greg Hawthorne; 44 Frank Pollard; 38 Sidney Thornton; Wide receivers (WR): 83 Theo Bell; 88 Lynn Swann; 85 Calvin Sweeney; Tight ends (TE): 89 Bennie Cunningham; 84 Randy Grossman	Offensive linemen (OL): 79 Larry Brown T; 77 Steve Courson G; 62 Tunch Ilkin T; 61 Tyrone McGriff G; 66 Ted Petersen T; 74 Ray Pinney G; 52 Mike Webster C; 73 Craig Wolfley G; Defensive linemen (DL): 76 John Banaszak DE; 65 Tom Beasley DT; 67 Gary Dunn DT; 64 Steve Furness DT; 75 Joe Greene DT; 68 L. C. Greenwood DE; 78 Dwight White DE	Linebackers (LB): 56 Robin Cole OLB; 59 Jack Ham OLB; 58 Jack Lambert MLB; 51 Loren Toews OLB; 54 Zack Valentine OLB; 53 Dennis Winston MLB; Defensive backs (DB): 30 Larry Anderson CB; 47 Mel Blount CB; 29 Ron Johnson CB; 41 Tom Moriarty SS; 31 Donnie Shell SS; 24 J. T. Thomas FS; 23 Mike Wagner FS; 49 Dwayne Woodruff CB/S; Special teams (ST): 9 Matt Bahr K; 5 Craig Colquitt P	Reserve: 57 Sam Davis G (IR); 87 Jim Ferranti WR (IR); 95 John Goodman DE (IR); 22 Bill Hurley FS (IR); 55 Jon Kolb T (IR); 90 Bob Kohrs LB (IR); 86 Jim Smith WR (IR); 82 John Stallworth WR (IR); 36 Ted Walton CB (IR); Rookies in italics 45 active, 9 reserve

== Preseason ==
=== Schedule ===
Week	Date	Opponent	Result	Record	Venue
1	August 9	at New York Giants	W 13–0	1–0	Giants Stadium
2	August 15	at Atlanta Falcons	W 17–14	2–0	Atlanta–Fulton County Stadium
3	August 23	New York Jets	L 13–20	2–1	Three Rivers Stadium
4	August 30	at Dallas Cowboys	W 31–10	3–1	Texas Stadium

== Regular season ==
=== Schedule ===
Week	Date	Opponent	Result	Record	Venue
1	September 7	Houston Oilers	W 31–17	1–0	Three Rivers Stadium
2	Sun. Sep. 14	at Baltimore Colts	W 20–17	2–0	Memorial Stadium
3	September 21	at Cincinnati Bengals	L 28–30	2–1	Riverfront Stadium
4	September 28	Chicago Bears	W 38–3	3–1	Three Rivers Stadium
5	October 5	at Minnesota Vikings	W 23–17	4–1	Metropolitan Stadium
6	October 12	Cincinnati Bengals	L 16–17	4–2	Three Rivers Stadium
7	October 20	Oakland Raiders	L 34–45	4–3	Three Rivers Stadium
8	October 26	at Cleveland Browns	L 26–27	4–4	Cleveland Municipal Stadium
9	November 2	Green Bay Packers	W 22–20	5–4	Three Rivers Stadium
10	November 9	at Tampa Bay Buccaneers	W 24–21	6–4	Tampa Stadium
11	November 16	Cleveland Browns	W 16–13	7–4	Three Rivers Stadium
12	November 23	at Buffalo Bills	L 13–28	7–5	Rich Stadium
13	November 30	Miami Dolphins	W 23–10	8–5	Three Rivers Stadium
14	December 4	at Houston Oilers	L 0–6	8–6	Astrodome
15	December 14	Kansas City Chiefs	W 21–16	9–6	Three Rivers Stadium
16	December 22	at San Diego Chargers	L 17–26	9–7	San Diego Stadium

=== Game summaries ===
==== Week 1: vs. Houston Oilers ====
The Steelers sat on a 17-0 first quarter lead and then had to score twice in the final 13 minutes to fight off a Houston comeback as Terry Bradshaw accounted for three of the Steelers four touchdowns. Larry Anderson provided the early fireworks when he returned the opening kickoff for 63 yards. The Steelers went on to score three of the four possessions but realized only three points as a result of four interceptions by Ken Stabler passes the first six times Houston has the ball. The Oilers got the 17 points back in the third quarter. Trailing 17-3, they scored two touchdowns in a span of 97 seconds. Earl Campbell's first pass, a sidearm wobbler, got the first score and when Theo Bell fumbled the next kickoff, Houston tied the game six plays later. Four Bradshaw passes ate up 72 of the 80-yard drive to get the Steelers back on top. A broken play on which John Stallworth outfought two defenders for a high Bradshaw lob was the final score of the game. Franco Harris passes Jim Taylor to become the third leading rusher in NFL history with 8,609 yards. Mel Blount and Donnie Shell had two interceptions each and Mike Wagner got the fifth.

Houston Oilers at Pittsburgh Steelers

Team	1	2	3	4	Total
Oilers	0	0	17	0	17
• Steelers	17	0	0	14	31

- Date: Sunday, September 7
- Location: Three Rivers Stadium, Pittsburgh, Pennsylvania
- Game start: 1:00 p.m. EST
- Game attendance: 54,386
- Game weather: 70 °F (21 °C), wind 8 mph (13 km/h)
- Referee: Dick Jorgensen
- TV announcers (NBC): Dick Enberg and Merlin Olsen

Scoring summary
1	Steelers	Sidney Thornton 29-yard pass from Terry Bradshaw (Matt Bahr kick)	Steelers 7–0
1	Steelers	Franco Harris 1-yard run (Matt Bahr kick)	Steelers 14–0
1	Steelers	Matt Bahr 27-yard field goal	Steelers 17–0
3	Oilers	Toni Fritsch 31-yard field goal	Steelers 17–3
3	Oilers	Billy Johnson 57-yard pass from Earl Campbell (Toni Fritsch kick)	Steelers 17–10
3	Oilers	Earl Campbell 1-yard run (Toni Fritsch kick)	Tie 17–17
4	Steelers	Terry Bradshaw 1-yard run (Matt Bahr kick)	Steelers 24–17
4	Steelers	John Stallworth 50-yard pass from Terry Bradshaw (Matt Bahr kick)	Steelers 31–17

==== Week 2: at Baltimore Colts ====
Pittsburgh Steelers at Baltimore Colts

Team	1	2	3	4	Total
• Steelers	3	10	0	7	20
Colts	0	7	10	0	17

- Date: Sunday, September 14
- Location: Memorial Stadium, Baltimore, Maryland
- Game start: 2:00 p.m. EST
- Game attendance: 54,914
- Game weather: 77 °F (25 °C), wind 7 mph (11 km/h)
- Referee: Ben Dreith
- TV announcers: (NBC) Charlie Jones and Len Dawson

Scoring summary
1	Steelers	Matt Bahr 25-yard field goal	Steelers 3–0
2	Steelers	Matt Bahr 29-yard field goal	Steelers 6–0
2	Colts	Sanders Shiver 34-yard interception return (Steve Mike-Mayer kick)	Colts 7–6
2	Steelers	Franco Harris 10-yard pass from Terry Bradshaw (Matt Bahr kick)	Steelers 13–7
3	Colts	Ray Butler 15-yard pass from Bert Jones (Steve Mike-Mayer kick)	Colts 14–13
3	Colts	Steve Mike-Mayer 20-yard field goal	Colts 17–13
4	Steelers	Jim Smith 24-yard pass from Terry Bradshaw (Matt Bahr kick)	Steelers 20–17

==== Week 3: at Cincinnati Bengals ====
Pittsburgh Steelers at Cincinnati Bengals

Team	1	2	3	4	Total
Steelers	0	14	7	7	28
• Bengals	10	3	0	17	30

- Date: Sunday, September 21
- Location: Riverfront Stadium, Cincinnati, Ohio
- Game start: 1:00 p.m. EST
- Game attendance: 52,490
- Game weather: 76 °F (24 °C), wind 12 mph (19 km/h)
- Referee: Red Cashion
- TV announcers (NBC): Don Criqui and John Brodie

Scoring summary
1	Bengals	Ray Griffin 28-yard interception return (Ian Sunter kick)	Bengals 7–0
1	Bengals	Ian Sunter 27-yard field goal	Bengals 10–0
2	Steelers	Jim Smith 45-yard pass from Terry Bradshaw (Matt Bahr kick)	Bengals 10–7
2	Steelers	Lynn Swann 14-yard pass from Terry Bradshaw (Matt Bahr kick)	Steelers 14–10
2	Bengals	Ian Sunter 42-yard field goal	Steelers 14–13
3	Steelers	Lynn Swann 68-yard pass from Terry Bradshaw (Matt Bahr kick)	Steelers 21–13
4	Bengals	Isaac Curtis 18-yard pass from Jack Thompson (Ian Sunter kick)	Steelers 21–20
4	Steelers	Greg Hawthorne 4-yard run (Matt Bahr kick)	Steelers 28–20
4	Bengals	Don Bass 22-yard pass from Jack Thompson (Ian Sunter kick)	Steelers 28–27
4	Bengals	Ian Sunter 21-yard field goal	Bengals 30–28

==== Week 4: vs. Chicago Bears ====
Chicago Bears at Pittsburgh Steelers

Team	1	2	3	4	Total
Bears	3	0	0	0	3
• Steelers	7	17	7	7	38

- Date: Sunday, September 28
- Location: Three Rivers Stadium, Pittsburgh, Pennsylvania
- Game start: 1:00 p.m. EST
- Game attendance: 53,987
- Game weather: 58 °F (14 °C), wind 6 mph (9.7 km/h)
- Referee: Jerry Seeman
- TV announcers (CBS): Frank Glieber and Roger Staubach

Scoring summary
1	Bears	Bob Thomas 28-yard field goal	Bears 3–0
1	Steelers	Jim Smith 21-yard pass from Terry Bradshaw (Matt Bahr kick)	Steelers 7–3
2	Steelers	Matt Bahr 20-yard field goal	Steelers 10–3
2	Steelers	Jim Smith 29-yard pass from Terry Bradshaw (Matt Bahr kick)	Steelers 17–3
2	Steelers	Jim Smith 23-yard pass from Terry Bradshaw (Matt Bahr kick)	Steelers 24–3
3	Steelers	Bennie Cunningham 2-yard pass from Terry Bradshaw (Matt Bahr kick)	Steelers 31–3
4	Steelers	Franco Harris 9-yard pass from Cliff Stoudt (Matt Bahr kick)	Steelers 38–3

==== Week 5: at Minnesota Vikings ====
Pittsburgh Steelers at Minnesota Vikings

Team	1	2	3	4	Total
• Steelers	6	10	7	0	23
Vikings	3	0	0	14	17

- Date: Sunday, October 5
- Location: Metropolitan Stadium, Bloomington, Minnesota
- Game start: 1:00 p.m. EST
- Game attendance: 47,583
- Game weather: 45 °F (7 °C), wind 11 mph (18 km/h)
- Referee: Cal Lepore
- TV announcers (NBC): Dick Enberg and Merlin Olsen

Scoring summary
1	Steelers	Calvin Sweeney 21-yard pass from Terry Bradshaw (kick failed)	Steelers 6–0
1	Vikings	Rick Danmeier 35-yard field goal	Steelers 6–3
2	Steelers	Franco Harris 4-yard run (Matt Bahr kick)	Steelers 13–3
2	Steelers	Matt Bahr 28-yard field goal	Steelers 16–3
3	Steelers	Terry Bradshaw 2-yard run (Matt Bahr kick)	Steelers 23–3
4	Vikings	Sammy White 21-yard pass from Tommy Kramer (Rick Danmeier kick)	Steelers 23–10
4	Vikings	Tommy Kramer 4-yard run (Rick Danmeier kick)	Steelers 23–17

==== Week 6: vs. Cincinnati Bengals ====
Cincinnati Bengals at Pittsburgh Steelers

Team	1	2	3	4	Total
• Bengals	10	7	0	0	17
Steelers	0	0	16	0	16

- Date: Sunday, October 12
- Location: Three Rivers Stadium, Pittsburgh, Pennsylvania
- Game start: 1:00 p.m. EST
- Game attendance: 53,668
- Game weather: 44 °F (7 °C), wind 13 mph (21 km/h)
- Referee: Fred Silva
- TV announcers (NBC): Sam Nover and Bob Trumpy

Scoring summary
1	Bengals	Charles Alexander (Ian Sunter kick)	Bengals 7–0
1	Bengals	Ian Sunter 24-yard field goal	Bengals 10–0
2	Bengals	Pete Johnson 28-yard pass from Ken Anderson (Ian Sunter kick)	Bengals 17–0
3	Steelers	Russell Davis 1-yard run (kick blocked)	Bengals 17–6
3	Steelers	Jim Smith 13-yard pass from Terry Bradshaw (Matt Bahr kick)	Bengals 17–13
3	Steelers	Matt Bahr 35-yard field goal	Bengals 17–16

==== Week 7 : vs. Oakland Raiders ====
Oakland Raiders at Pittsburgh Steelers

Team	1	2	3	4	Total
• Raiders	7	21	7	10	45
Steelers	10	14	10	0	34

- Date: Monday, October 20
- Location: Three Rivers Stadium, Pittsburgh, Pennsylvania
- Game start: 9:00 p.m. EST
- Game attendance: 53,940
- Game weather: 42 °F (6 °C), wind 12 mph (19 km/h)
- Referee: Pat Haggerty
- TV announcers (ABC): Frank Gifford, Howard Cosell, and Don Meredith

Scoring summary
1	11:59	Steelers	Jim Smith 19-yard pass from Terry Bradshaw (Matt Bahr kick)	Steelers 7–0
1	9:27	Steelers	Matt Bahr 18-yard field goal	Steelers 10–0
1	7:22	Raiders	Kenny King 27-yard run (Chris Bahr kick)	Steelers 10–7
2		Steelers	Terry Hawthorne 1-yard run (Matt Bahr kick)	Steelers 17–7
2	5:22	Raiders	Mark van Eeghen 1-yard run (Chris Bahr kick)	Steelers 17–14
2	3:05	Raiders	Rod Martin 34-yard fumble return (Chris Bahr kick)	Raiders 21–17
2	1:22	Raiders	Morris Bradshaw 45-yard pass from Jim Plunkett (Chris Bahr kick)	Raiders 28–17
2	0:10	Steelers	Jim Smith 13-yard pass from Cliff Stoudt (Matt Bahr kick)	Raiders 28–24
3	12:36	Raiders	Cliff Branch 56-yard pass from Jim Plunkett (Chris Bahr kick)	Raiders 35–24
3		Steelers	Theo Bell 36-yard pass from Terry Bradshaw (Matt Bahr kick)	Raiders 35–31
3		Steelers	Matt Bahr 32-yard field goal	Raiders 35–34
4		Raiders	Cliff Branch 34-yard pass from Jim Plunkett (Chris Bahr kick)	OAK 42–34
4	0:58	Raiders	Chris Bahr 36-yard field goal	Raiders 45–34

==== Week 8: at Cleveland Browns ====
Pittsburgh Steelers at Cleveland Browns

Team	1	2	3	4	Total
Steelers	10	3	13	0	26
• Browns	0	7	7	13	27

- Date: Sunday, October 26
- Location: Cleveland Municipal Stadium, Cleveland, Ohio
- Game start: 1:00 p.m. EST
- Game attendance: 79,095
- Game weather: 37 °F (3 °C), wind 25 mph (40 km/h)
- Referee: Bob Frederic
- TV announcers (NBC): Don Criqui and John Brodie

Scoring summary
1	Steelers	Greg Hawthorne 1-yard run (Matt Bahr kick)	Steelers 7–0
1	Steelers	Matt Bahr 27-yard field goal	Steelers 10–0
2	Browns	Calvin Hill 5-yard pass from Brian Sipe (Don Cockroft kick)	Steelers 10–7
2	Steelers	Matt Bahr 22-yard field goal	Steelers 13–7
3	Steelers	Greg Hawthorne 2-yard run (Matt Bahr kick)	Steelers 20–7
3	Browns	Greg Pruitt 6-yard pass from Brian Sipe (Don Cockroft kick)	Steelers 20–14
3	Steelers	Sidney Thornton 2-yard run (kick failed)	Steelers 26–14
4	Browns	Greg Pruitt 7-yard pass from Brian Sipe (kick failed)	Steelers 26–20
4	Browns	Ozzie Newsome 18-yard pass from Brian Sipe (Don Cockroft kick)	Browns 27–26

==== Week 9: vs. Green Bay Packers ====
Green Bay Packers at Pittsburgh Steelers

Team	1	2	3	4	Total
Packers	7	7	0	6	20
• Steelers	2	7	6	7	22

- Date: Sunday, November 2
- Location: Three Rivers Stadium, Pittsburgh, Pennsylvania
- Game start: 1:00 p.m. EST
- Game attendance: 52,165
- Game weather: 40 °F (4 °C), wind 7 mph (11 km/h)
- Referee: Ben Dreith
- TV announcers (CBS): Pat Summerall and Tom Brookshier

Scoring summary
1	Steelers	Safety, ball snapped out of end zone	Steelers 2–0
1	Packers	Gerry Ellis 7-yard pass from Lynn Dickey (Thomas Birney kick)	Packers 7–2
2	Steelers	Lynn Swann 7-yard pass from Terry Bradshaw (Matt Bahr kick)	Steelers 9–7
2	Packers	Gerry Ellis 69-yard pass from Lynn Dickey (Thomas Birney kick)	Packers 14–9
3	Steelers	Matt Bahr 27-yard field goal	Packers 14–12
3	Steelers	Matt Bahr 18-yard field goal	Steelers 15–14
4	Steelers	Rocky Bleier 4-yard pass from Terry Bradshaw (Matt Bahr kick)	Steelers 22–14
4	Packers	Aundra Thompson 14-yard pass from Lynn Dickey (kick blocked)	Steelers 22–20

==== Week 10: at Tampa Bay Buccaneers ====
Pittsburgh Steelers at Tampa Bay Buccaneers

Team	1	2	3	4	Total
• Steelers	10	14	0	0	24
Buccaneers	7	7	7	0	21

- Date: Sunday, November 9
- Location: Tampa Stadium, Tampa, Florida
- Game start: 1:00 p.m. EST
- Game attendance: 71,636
- Game weather: 74 °F (23 °C), wind 7 mph (11 km/h)
- Referee: Fred Wyant
- TV announcers (NBC): Dick Enberg and Merlin Olsen

Scoring summary
1	Steelers	Matt Bahr 48-yard field goal	Steelers 3–0
1	Steelers	Dennis Winston recovered blocked punt in end zone (Matt Bahr kick)	Steelers 10–0
1	Buccaneers	Kevin House 26-yard pass from Doug Williams (Garo Yepremian kick)	Steelers 10–7
2	Steelers	Sidney Thornton 1-yard run (Matt Bahr kick)	Steelers 17–7
2	Buccaneers	Jimmie Giles 12-yard pass from Doug Williams (Garo Yepremian kick)	Steelers 17–14
2	Steelers	Lynn Swann 20-yard pass from Terry Bradshaw (Matt Bahr kick)	Steelers 24–14
3	Buccaneers	Ricky Bell 8-yard pass from Doug Williams (Garo Yepremian kick)	Steelers 24–21

==== Week 11: vs. Cleveland Browns ====
Cleveland Browns at Pittsburgh Steelers

Team	1	2	3	4	Total
Browns	0	13	0	0	13
• Steelers	0	7	0	9	16

- Date: Sunday, November 16
- Location: Three Rivers Stadium, Pittsburgh, Pennsylvania
- Game start: 1:00 p.m. EST
- Game attendance: 54,563
- Game weather: 36 °F (2 °C), wind 8 mph (13 km/h)
- Referee: Jerry Markbreit
- TV announcers (NBC): Dick Enberg and Merlin Olsen

Scoring summary
1	Steelers	Jim Smith 10-yard pass from Terry Bradshaw (Matt Bahr kick)	Steelers 7–0
1	Browns	Ozzie Newsome 4-yard pass from Brian Sipe (kick failed)	Steelers 7–6
1	Browns	Dave Logan 15-yard pass from Brian Sipe (Don Cockroft kick)	Browns 13–7
4	Steelers	Safety, Johnny Evans tackled by Loren Toews in end zone	Browns 13–9
4	Steelers	Lynn Swann 3-yard pass from Terry Bradshaw (Matt Bahr kick)	Steelers 16–13

==== Week 12: at Buffalo Bills ====
Pittsburgh Steelers at Buffalo Bills

Team	1	2	3	4	Total
Steelers	7	3	0	3	13
• Bills	7	7	7	7	28

- Date: Sunday, November 23
- Location: Rich Stadium, Orchard Park, New York
- Game start: 1:00 p.m. EST
- Game attendance: 79,659
- Game weather: 41 °F (5 °C), wind 10 mph (16 km/h)
- Referee: Dick Jorgensen
- TV announcers (NBC): Don Criqui and John Brodie

Scoring summary
1	Steelers	Franco Harris 2-yard run (Matt Bahr kick)	Steelers 7–0
1	Bills	Jerry Butler 29-yard pass from Joe Ferguson (Nick Mike-Mayer kick)	Tie 7–7
2	Bills	Jerry Butler 10-yard pass from Joe Ferguson (Nick Mike-Mayer kick)	Bills 14–7
2	Steelers	Matt Bahr 36-yard field goal	Bills 14–10
3	Bills	Curtis Brown 34-yard run (Nick Mike-Mayer kick)	Bills 21–10
4	Bills	Reuben Gant 2-yard pass from Joe Ferguson (Nick Mike-Mayer kick)	Bills 28–10
4	Steelers	Matt Bahr 42-yard field goal	Bills 28–13

==== Week 13: vs. Miami Dolphins ====
Miami Dolphins at Pittsburgh Steelers

Team	1	2	3	4	Total
Dolphins	0	3	0	7	10
• Steelers	0	13	3	7	23

- Date: Sunday, November 30
- Location: Three Rivers Stadium, Pittsburgh, Pennsylvania
- Game start: 1:00 p.m. EST
- Game attendance: 51,384
- Game weather: 36 °F (2 °C), wind 14 mph (23 km/h)
- Referee: Cal Lepore
- TV announcers (NBC): Don Criqui and John Brodie

Scoring summary
2	Steelers	Matt Bahr 32-yard field goal	Steelers 3–0
2	Steelers	Lynn Swann 30-yard pass from Terry Bradshaw (Matt Bahr kick)	Steelers 10–0
2	Dolphins	Uwe von Schamann 42-yard field goal	Steelers 10–3
2	Steelers	Matt Bahr 33-yard field goal	Steelers 13–3
3	Steelers	Matt Bahr 30-yard field goal	Steelers 16–3
4	Dolphins	Nat Moore 31-yard pass from David Woodley (Uwe von Schamann kick)	Steelers 16–10
4	Steelers	Franco Harris 9-yard run (Matt Bahr kick)	Steelers 23–10

==== Week 14 : at Houston Oilers ====
Pittsburgh Steelers at Houston Oilers

Team	1	2	3	4	Total
Steelers	0	0	0	0	0
• Oilers	0	0	3	3	6

- Date: Thursday, December 4
- Location: Houston Astrodome, Houston, Texas
- Game start: 8:30 p.m. EST
- Game attendance: 53,960
- Game weather: Indoors (dome)
- Referee: Ben Dreith
- TV announcers (ABC): Frank Gifford, Howard Cosell, and Don Meredith

Scoring summary
3	Oilers	Toni Fritsch 37-yard field goal	Oilers 3–0
4	Oilers	Toni Fritsch 33-yard field goal	Oilers 6–0

==== Week 15: vs. Kansas City Chiefs ====
Kansas City Chiefs at Pittsburgh Steelers

Team	1	2	3	4	Total
Chiefs	0	3	13	0	16
• Steelers	7	0	0	14	21

- Date: Sunday, December 14
- Location: Three Rivers Stadium, Pittsburgh, Pennsylvania
- Game start: 1:00 p.m. EST
- Game attendance: 50,013
- Game weather: 26 °F (−3 °C), wind 17 mph (27 km/h)
- Referee: Fred Silva
- TV announcers (NBC): Marv Albert and Mike Haffner

Scoring summary
1	Steelers	Lynn Swann 9-yard pass from Terry Bradshaw (Matt Bahr kick)	Steelers 7–0
2	Chiefs	Nick Lowery 36-yard field goal	Steelers 7–3
3	Chiefs	James Hadnot 3-yard run (Nick Lowery kick)	Chiefs 10–7
3	Chiefs	Nick Lowery 22-yard field goal	Chiefs 13–7
3	Chiefs	Nick Lowery 50-yard field goal	Chiefs 16–7
4	Steelers	Theo Bell 13-yard pass from Terry Bradshaw (Matt Bahr kick)	Chiefs 16–14
4	Steelers	Rocky Bleier 11-yard run (Matt Bahr kick)	Steelers 21–16

==== Week 16: at San Diego Chargers ====
Pittsburgh Steelers at San Diego Chargers

Team	1	2	3	4	Total
Steelers	0	3	7	7	17
• Chargers	3	6	10	7	26

- Date: Monday, December 22
- Location: San Diego Stadium, San Diego, California
- Game start: 9:00 p.m. EST
- Game attendance: 51,785
- Game weather: 57 °F (14 °C), wind 7 mph (11 km/h)
- Referee: Jim Tunney
- TV announcers (ABC): Frank Gifford, Howard Cosell, and Don Meredith

Scoring summary
1	Chargers	Rolf Benirschke 33-yard field goal	Chargers 3–0
2	Steelers	Matt Bahr 32-yard field goal	Tie 3–3
2	Chargers	Rolf Benirschke 26-yard field goal	Chargers 6–3
2	Chargers	Rolf Benirschke 26-yard field goal	Chargers 9–3
3	Chargers	Dan Fouts 1-yard run (Rolf Benirschke kick)	Chargers 16–3
3	Steelers	Sidney Thornton 2-yard run (Matt Bahr kick)	Chargers 16–10
3	Chargers	Rolf Benirschke 33-yard field goal	Chargers 19–10
4	Chargers	Chuck Muncie 10-yard run (Rolf Benirschke kick)	Chargers 26–10
4	Steelers	Bennie Cunningham 16-yard pass from Terry Bradshaw (Matt Bahr kick)	Chargers 26–17

=== Standings ===
AFC Central
	W	L	T	PCT	DIV	CONF	PF	PA	STK
Cleveland Browns^{(2)}	11	5	0	.688	4–2	8–4	357	310	W1
Houston Oilers^{(5)}	11	5	0	.688	4–2	7–5	295	251	W3
Pittsburgh Steelers	9	7	0	.563	2–4	5–7	352	313	L1
Cincinnati Bengals	6	10	0	.375	2–4	4–8	244	312	L1
