= Tom Graves (American football) =

American football player (born 1955)

No. 50
- Position: Linebacker

Personal information
- Born: December 18, 1955 (age 70); Norfolk, Virginia, U.S.
- Listed height: 6 ft 3 in (1.91 m)
- Listed weight: 228 lb (103 kg)

Career information
- High school: Lake Taylor (Norfolk)
- College: Michigan State
- NFL draft: 1979: 8th round, 220th overall pick

Career history
- Pittsburgh Steelers (1979)

Awards and highlights
- Super Bowl champion (XIV); Second-team All-Big Ten (1974)

Career NFL statistics
- Games played: 11
- Stats at Pro Football Reference

Thomas Edward Graves Jr. (born December 18, 1955) is an American former professional football player who was a linebacker for one season with the Pittsburgh Steelers of the National Football League (NFL). He played college football for the Michigan State Spartans. As an NFL rookie, he won a Super Bowl ring with the Steelers in Super Bowl XIV.
