= Bennie Cunningham =

American football player (1954–2018)

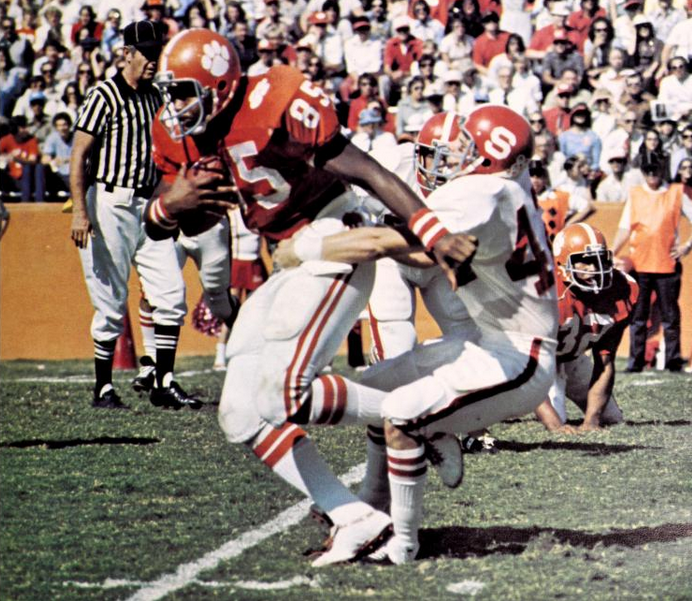
- Cunningham with Clemson in 1975

No. 89
- Position: Tight end

Personal information
- Born: December 23, 1954; Laurens, South Carolina, U.S.
- Died: April 23, 2018 (aged 63); Cleveland, Ohio, U.S.
- Listed height: 6 ft 6 in (1.98 m)
- Listed weight: 254 lb (115 kg)

Career information
- High school: Seneca (Seneca, South Carolina)
- College: Clemson
- NFL draft: 1976: 1st round, 28th overall pick

Career history
- Pittsburgh Steelers (1976–1985)

Awards and highlights
- 2× Super Bowl champion (XIII, XIV); Pittsburgh Steelers All-Time Team; Consensus All-American (1974); First-team All-American (1975); 2× First-team All-ACC (1974, 1975)

Career NFL statistics
- Receptions: 202
- Receiving yards: 2,879
- Receiving touchdowns: 20
- Stats at Pro Football Reference

Bennie Lee Cunningham Jr. (December 23, 1954 – April 23, 2018) was an American professional football player who was a tight end for the Pittsburgh Steelers of the National Football League (NFL). He was born to Bennie Lee Cunningham Sr., and Carol Cunningham. He was selected 28th overall in the first round out of Clemson University in the 1976 NFL draft by the Steelers. During his career, he played in 118 games and caught 202 receptions for 2,879 yards and 20 touchdowns.

Cunningham's most famous play in the NFL was a game-winning touchdown in a Pittsburgh home game versus divisional rival Cleveland on September 24, 1978. It came on a flea-flicker play, culminating in a pass from Terry Bradshaw to Cunningham, who caught the ball in the back right corner of the end zone. It gave the Steelers a dramatic 15–9 victory over the Browns in sudden-death overtime.

On April 23, 2018, Cunningham died at age 63 at the Cleveland Clinic in Ohio, where he had been fighting cancer for about three months.

== NFL career statistics ==
Legend
	Won the Super Bowl
**Bold**	Career high

=== Regular season ===
Year	Team	Games		Receiving				
Year	Team	GP	GS	Rec	Yds	Avg	Lng	TD
1976	PIT	12	0	5	49	9.8	20	1
1977	PIT	12	11	20	347	17.4	43	2
1978	PIT	6	6	16	321	**20.1**	**48**	2
1979	PIT	15	7	36	512	14.2	41	**4**
1980	PIT	15	1	18	232	12.9	35	2
1981	PIT	15	15	**41**	**574**	14.0	30	3
1982	PIT	9	9	21	277	13.2	31	2
1983	PIT	**16**	**16**	35	442	12.6	29	3
1984	PIT	7	4	4	64	16.0	29	1
1985	PIT	11	11	6	61	10.2	17	0
		118	80	202	2,879	14.3	48	20

=== Playoffs ===
Year	Team	Games		Receiving				
Year	Team	GP	GS	Rec	Yds	Avg	Lng	TD
1976	PIT	2	1	4	36	9.0	**29**	0
1977	PIT	1	0	3	42	14.0	19	0
1979	PIT	**3**	**3**	4	35	8.8	16	**1**
1982	PIT	1	1	**5**	**55**	11.0	16	**1**
1983	PIT	1	1	2	32	16.0	18	0
1984	PIT	2	1	1	19	**19.0**	19	0
		10	7	19	219	11.5	29	2
