= Matt Bahr =

American football player (born 1956)

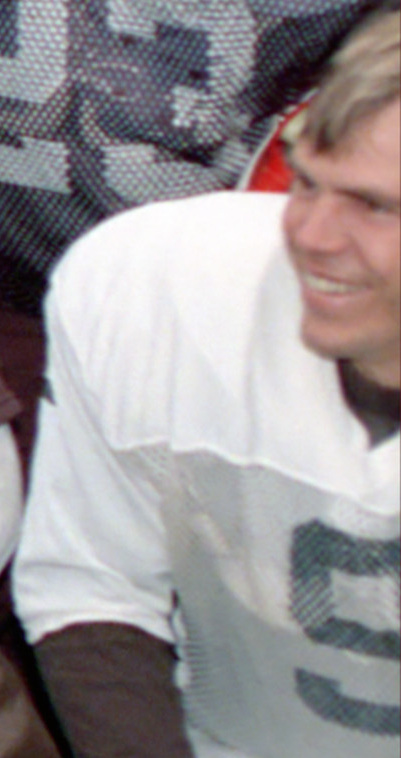
- Bahr with the Cleveland Browns in 1988

Personal information
- Born: Matthew David Bahr; July 6, 1956 (age 70) Philadelphia, Pennsylvania, U.S.
- Height: 5 ft 10 in (178 cm)
- Weight: 175 lb (79 kg; 12 st 7 lb)
Association football career
- Position: Defender
College career
Years	Team	Apps	(Gls)
1974–1977	Penn State Nittany Lions		
Senior career*
Years	Team	Apps	(Gls)
1978	Caribous of Colorado	24	(0)
1978	Tulsa Roughnecks	2	(0)
1979	Pennsylvania Stoners	0	(0)
Total		26	(0)
- * Club domestic league appearances and goals

Sport
- Football career

No. 9, 10, 11, 3
- Position: Placekicker

Career information
- High school: Neshaminy (Langhorne, Pennsylvania)
- College: Penn State
- NFL draft: 1979: 6th round, 165th overall pick

Career history
- Pittsburgh Steelers (1979–1980); San Francisco 49ers (1981); Cleveland Browns (1981–1989); New York Giants (1990–1992); Philadelphia Eagles (1993); New England Patriots (1993–1995)

Awards and highlights
- 2× Super Bowl champion (XIV, XXV); First-team All-American (1978); First-team All-East (1978)

Career NFL statistics
- Points scored: 1,422
- Field goal attempts: 415
- Field goals / percent: 300 / 72.3%
- PAT attempts: 534
- PAT kicks / percent: 522 / 97.8%
- Stats at Pro Football Reference

Matthew David Bahr (born July 6, 1956) is an American former professional football placekicker in the National Football League (NFL), and professional soccer player in the North American Soccer League (NASL). He attended Neshaminy High School in Langhorne, Pennsylvania, where he excelled in both football and soccer. He is the son of National Soccer Hall of Fame inductee Walter Bahr, and is the brother of NFL kicker Chris Bahr; he and Chris are two of six players to have played in both professional soccer and the NFL.

== Soccer career ==
In 1978, he signed with the Caribous of Colorado of the North American Soccer League, for whom he made 24 appearances and made three assists. The Caribous traded him to the Tulsa Roughnecks during the season, and he made two appearances. On March 27, 1979, he signed with the Pennsylvania Stoners of the second division American Soccer League.

== Professional football career ==
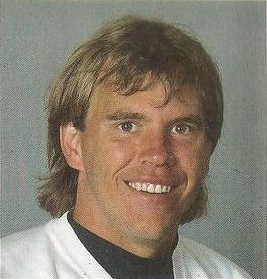
Bahr in 1985

In 1979, he was selected by the Pittsburgh Steelers in the sixth round of the 1979 NFL draft, from Penn State, where he was a consensus All-America selection in his senior year. His brother Chris Bahr followed a similar career path. Over his career, which spanned from 1979 to 1995, he played for the Pittsburgh Steelers, the San Francisco 49ers, the Cleveland Browns, the New York Giants, the Philadelphia Eagles and the New England Patriots. As a rookie, he won a Super Bowl ring with the Steelers in Super Bowl XIV. In 1981, Bahr signed with the 49ers, but was traded to the Cleveland Browns midway through the season, thus missing out on a second Super Bowl ring (the 49ers went on the win the Super Bowl that year). After discovering he had been traded, Bahr left a note on his San Francisco locker stating, "See you in the Super Bowl." While this did not happen (the Browns went 5–11 in 1981), Bahr did get some retribution against his former team when he kicked a game winning field goal to give the Browns a 15–12 victory over San Francisco in week 11.

His longest tenure was with the Browns where he played for nine years and was cut during the 1990 preseason. In late September of that season, he was picked up by the New York Giants after a repetitious injury to Raúl Allegre. In the 1990 NFC Championship Game on January 20, 1991, Bahr had a tremendous performance for the Giants, as he set an NFC Championship Game record with five field goals (which included a 42-yarder as time expired) and scored all the points for the Giants to help lift them to victory over San Francisco 15–13 to reach the Super Bowl. One week later in Super Bowl XXV, Bahr was successful in both of his extra points and field goals, which included the go-ahead field goal with 7:20 remaining as the Giants beat the Buffalo Bills 20–19.

Bahr played the final seasons of his career with the New England Patriots. In 1996, rookie kicker Adam Vinatieri beat him out for the starting kicker spot on the team, and he decided to retire after being cut by Patriots during the preseason.

Bahr held the record for longest span for a player between Super Bowl victories at 11 years, until Ray Lewis of the Baltimore Ravens went 12 years from Super Bowl XXXV in 2001 to Super Bowl XLVII in 2013.

Bahr finished his 17 seasons with 300 of 415 field goals and 522 of 534 extra points. Overall, he scored a total of 1,422 points.

At the time of his retirement, Bahr was the last active NFL player that played for the Steelers in at least one of their four Super Bowl wins in the 1970s. Coincidentally, his last year in the NFL saw the Steelers return to the Super Bowl that season in Super Bowl XXX, their first Super Bowl appearance since his rookie season.

== Career regular season statistics ==
Career high/best bolded

Regular season statistics
Season	Team (record)	G	FGM	FGA	%	<20	20-29	30-39	40-49	50+	LNG	BLK	XPM	XPA	%	PTS
1979	PIT (12–4)	**16**	18	30	60.0	0–0	5–5	6–11	7–13	0–1	46	0	**50**	**52**	96.2	104
1980	PIT (9–7)	**16**	19	28	67.9	2–2	8–9	7–10	2–6	0–1	48	0	39	42	92.9	96
1981	SF (13–3)	4	2	6	33.3	0–0	0–2	0–1	2–3	0–0	47	0	12	12	**100.0**	18
1981	CLE (5–11)	11	13	20	65.0	3–3	5–5	5–9	0–2	0–1	39	0	22	22	**100.0**	61
1982	CLE (4–5)	9	7	15	46.7	1–1	3–4	1–3	2–7	0–0	45	0	17	17	**100.0**	38
1983	CLE (9–7)	**16**	21	24	**87.5**	1–1	9–9	5–6	6–7	0–1	47	0	38	40	95.0	101
1984	CLE (5–11)	**16**	24	32	75.0	3–3	12–12	2–7	6–9	1–1	50	0	25	25	**100.0**	97
1985	CLE (8–8)	**16**	14	18	77.8	1–1	2–2	8–9	3–5	0–1	45	0	35	35	**100.0**	77
1986	CLE (12–4)	12	20	26	76.9	**4–4**	7–9	7–8	1–2	1–3	52	0	30	30	**100.0**	90
1987	CLE (10–5)	3	4	5	80.0	0–0	2–2	2–3	0–0	0–0	31	0	9	10	90.0	21
1988	CLE (10–6)	**16**	24	29	82.8	1–1	10–12	8–10	5–6	0–0	47	0	32	33	97.0	104
1989	CLE (9–6–1)	**16**	16	24	66.7	0–0	5–5	6–8	4–9	1–2	50	0	40	40	**100.0**	88
1990	NYG (13–3)	13	17	23	73.9	2–2	7–7	3–3	5–9	0–2	49	0	29	30	96.7	80
1991	NYG (8–8)	13	22	29	75.9	0–0	6–6	6–8	**9–12**	1–3	54	**1**	24	25	96.0	90
1992	NYG (6–10)	12	16	21	76.2	2–2	1–1	**10–11**	3–5	0–2	47	0	29	29	**100.0**	77
1993	PHI (8–8)	11	8	13	61.5	0–0	4–6	2–2	2–5	0–0	48	0	18	19	94.7	42
1993	NE (5–11)	3	5	5	100.0	1–1	1–1	3–3	0–0	0–0	37	0	10	10	**100.0**	25
1994	NE (10–6)	**16**	**27**	**34**	79.4	0–0	**14–14**	9–12	4–8	0–0	48	0	36	36	**100.0**	**117**
1995	NE (6–10)	**16**	23	33	69.7	1–2	12–12	3–7	5–7	**2–5**	**55**	**1**	27	27	**100.0**	96
Career (17 seasons)		235	300	415	72.3	22–23	113–123	93–131	66–115	6–23	55	2	522	534	97.8	1422

== Personal life ==
He appeared in the 1980 television movie, Fighting Back: The Rocky Bleier Story.

He is now an electrical engineer in Pittsburgh, Pennsylvania.
