= Mike Wagner =

American football player (1949–2026)

No. 23
- Position: Safety

Personal information
- Born: June 22, 1949; Waukegan, Illinois, U.S.
- Died: February 18, 2026 (aged 76); Cranberry, Pennsylvania, U.S.
- Listed height: 6 ft 1 in (1.85 m)
- Listed weight: 210 lb (95 kg)

Career information
- High school: Carmel (Mundelein, Illinois)
- College: Western Illinois
- NFL draft: 1971: 11th round, 268th overall pick

Career history
- Pittsburgh Steelers (1971–1980)

Awards and highlights
- 4× Super Bowl champion (IX, X, XIII, XIV); First-team All-Pro (1973); Second-team All-Pro (1976); 2× Pro Bowl (1975, 1976); NFL interceptions co-leader (1973); Pittsburgh Steelers 50th Anniversary Team; Pittsburgh Steelers Hall of Honor

Career NFL statistics
- Interceptions: 36
- Fumble recoveries: 12
- Forced fumbles: 5
- Stats at Pro Football Reference

Michael Robert Wagner (June 22, 1949 – February 18, 2026) was an American professional football player who was a safety for 10 seasons with the Pittsburgh Steelers of the National Football League (NFL). He played college football for the Western Illinois Leathernecks. He won four Super Bowls with the Steelers as a member of their famed Steel Curtain defense. Alongside Jack Ham, Wagner holds the franchise record for most playoff interceptions with five.

== Playing career ==
Born in Waukegan, Illinois, Wagner graduated in 1967 from Carmel High School in Mundelein. He played college football at Western Illinois University in Macomb, earning NAIA All-American status in 1969. He was added to the Western Illinois Athletics Hall of Fame in 1976.

Wagner was selected by the Pittsburgh Steelers in the 11th round of the 1971 NFL draft, the 268th overall selection. First looked at as a wide receiver on offense, he was soon switched to defense as a safety. Wagner tied for the NFL lead with eight interceptions in 1973, appeared in the 1975 and 1976 Pro Bowls and recorded 36 career interceptions and 12 fumble recoveries. He won four Super Bowls, recording interceptions in Super Bowl IX and Super Bowl X. After ten seasons with the Steelers, he retired in January 1981.

== After retirement ==
Wagner was a defensive backs coach at Pine-Richland High School in Gibsonia, Pennsylvania. He was interviewed for the NFL Films documentary series America's Game: The Super Bowl Champions on the 1975 Pittsburgh Steelers.

For a short time, Wagner also served as an assistant coach on the Pine-Richland High School (Gibsonia, PA) coaching staff, mainly working with the defensive backs and special teams.

Wagner was the guest speaker at the 3rd annual Steel City Mafia Banquet in Latrobe, Pennsylvania, on August 15, 2009.

After pro football, Wagner applied his bachelor's degree in accounting and worked in the financial industry. He earned an M.B.A. from the University of Pittsburgh and, as of 2012, was a bank vice president in Pittsburgh.

Wagner died from pancreatic cancer in Cranberry, Pennsylvania, on February 18, 2026, at the age of 76.
