= Greg Hawthorne =

American football player (1956–2026)

No. 27, 40, 83
- Positions: Running back, tight end, wide receiver

Personal information
- Born: September 5, 1956; Fort Worth, Texas, U.S.
- Died: July 8, 2026 (aged 69)
- Listed height: 6 ft 2 in (1.88 m)
- Listed weight: 228 lb (103 kg)

Career information
- High school: Polytechnic (Fort Worth)
- College: Baylor
- NFL draft: 1979: 1st round, 28th overall pick

Career history
- Pittsburgh Steelers (1979–1983); New England Patriots (1984–1986); Indianapolis Colts (1987)

Awards and highlights
- Super Bowl champion (XIV)

Career NFL statistics
- Receiving yards: 1,112
- Receptions: 92
- Receiving touchdowns: 4
- Rushing yards: 527
- Rush attempts: 137
- Rushing touchdowns: 7
- Stats at Pro Football Reference

Greg Hawthorne (September 5, 1956 – July 8, 2026) was an American professional football player in the National Football League (NFL). He played college football for the Baylor Bears and was selected in the first round of the 1979 NFL draft with the 28th overall pick. Hawthorne played nine seasons, beginning with the Pittsburgh Steelers. As a rookie, he won a Super Bowl ring with the Steelers in Super Bowl XIV over the Los Angeles Rams. He also played for the New England Patriots (including playing in Super Bowl XX), and for the Indianapolis Colts. In the 1985 AFC Championship Game, as a member of the Patriots, Hawthorne recovered a fumble by Miami that was pivotal in the Patriots upset victory.

As a running back, tight end, and wide receiver, he accumulated 527 rushing yards and 92 receptions in his career. He last appeared in three games for the Colts in the 1987 season as a replacement player during that year's NFL player's strike.

Hawthorne died on July 8, 2026, at the age of 69.
