= Super Bowl XIV =

1980 Edition of the Super Bowl

Los Angeles Rams (3) (NFC) (9–7)	Pittsburgh Steelers (2) (AFC) (12–4)
19	31
Head coach: Ray Malavasi	Head coach: Chuck Noll
	1	2	3	4	Total
LA	7	6	6	0	19
PIT	3	7	7	14	31
- Date: January 20, 1980
- Kickoff time: 3:15 p.m. PST (UTC-8)
- Stadium: Rose Bowl; Pasadena, California
- MVP: Terry Bradshaw, quarterback
- Favorite: Steelers by 10.5
- Referee: Fred Silva
- Attendance: 103,985

Ceremonies
- National anthem: Cheryl Ladd
- Coin toss: Fred Silva with Art Rooney
- Halftime show: Up with People presents "A Salute to the Big Band Era"

TV in the United States
- Network: CBS
- Announcers: Pat Summerall and Tom Brookshier
- Nielsen ratings: 46.3 (est. 76.2 million viewers)
- Market share: 67
- Cost of 30-second commercial: $222,000

Radio in the United States
- Network: CBS Radio
- Announcers: Jack Buck and Hank Stram

Super Bowl XIV was an American football game between the National Football Conference (NFC) champion Los Angeles Rams and the American Football Conference (AFC) champion Pittsburgh Steelers to decide the National Football League (NFL) champion for the 1979 season. The Steelers defeated the Rams by the score of 31–19, becoming the first team to win four Super Bowls. The game was played on January 20, 1980, at the Rose Bowl in Pasadena, California, and was attended by a Super Bowl record 103,985 spectators. It was also the first Super Bowl where the game was played in the home market of one of the participants, as Pasadena is 10 miles (16 km) northeast of Downtown Los Angeles (the Los Angeles Memorial Coliseum, the Rams' home at the time, is 15 miles (24 km) from the Rose Bowl).

The Rams became the first team to reach the Super Bowl after posting nine wins or fewer during the regular season since the NFL season expanded to 16 games in 1978. Their 9–7 regular season record was followed by postseason wins over the Dallas Cowboys and the Tampa Bay Buccaneers. The Steelers were the defending Super Bowl XIII champions, and finished the 1979 regular season with a 12–4 record, and posted playoff victories over the Miami Dolphins and the Houston Oilers.

Despite the final score, Super Bowl XIV was a seesaw battle for the majority of the contest. The lead changed seven times, which remains a Super Bowl record as of 2023. It was the third Super Bowl where the winning team was behind at halftime (Super Bowl V and Super Bowl X were the others; the Colts trailed the Cowboys 13–6 at the half in V en route to win 16–13, while the Steelers trailed the Cowboys 10–7 in X and won 21–17) and the first where they were behind by the fourth quarter. Los Angeles took the lead three times while Pittsburgh took it four times, including the game clincher. The Rams led 13–10 at halftime before Steelers quarterback Terry Bradshaw connected with wide receiver Lynn Swann on a 47-yard touchdown pass. Los Angeles regained the lead on a halfback option play with running back Lawrence McCutcheon's 24-yard touchdown pass to Ron Smith. But Pittsburgh controlled the fourth quarter, scoring 14 unanswered points with Bradshaw's 73-yard touchdown pass to wide receiver John Stallworth, and running back Franco Harris' 1-yard touchdown run. Despite throwing three interceptions, Bradshaw was named Super Bowl MVP by completing 14 of 21 passes for 309 yards and two touchdowns.

== Background ==
=== Host selection process ===
The NFL awarded Super Bowl XIV to Pasadena on June 14, 1977, at the owners' meetings held in New York City. For the first time since 1973, multiple Super Bowl host sites were selected at the same meeting. A total of eight cities submitted bids: Miami, Pasadena, (Rose Bowl), Los Angeles (Coliseum), Houston, New Orleans, Dallas (Cotton Bowl), Seattle (Kingdome), and Detroit (Pontiac Silverdome). Seattle and Detroit were attempting to become the first cold-weather city to host a Super Bowl, albeit inside a domed stadium. Though neither were selected, Detroit was invited to bid for a future game at the next meeting.

The selection of Pasadena came just six months after the Rose Bowl hosted its first Super Bowl (XI). Observers noted that the owners stuck with familiar venues this time around, choosing Miami for XIII and Pasadena for XIV. Early favorite Houston (Rice Stadium) reportedly fell out of favor with owners when it was revealed that birds were found in the showers of the Vikings training facility during Super Bowl VIII. Likewise New Orleans was passed over since the Superdome was already set to host Super Bowl XII.

=== Los Angeles Rams ===
Team owner Carroll Rosenbloom drowned during an off-season accident, resulting in a power struggle between his second wife, Georgia Frontiere, and his son, Steve Rosenbloom. Frontiere eventually gained control of the team and fired her stepson after the pre-season (who was hired by the New Orleans Saints to become their general manager). Prior to Carroll Rosenbloom's death, the Rams had already announced their intentions to leave the Los Angeles Memorial Coliseum and move to Anaheim Stadium in Orange County for the 1980 season.

The Rams barely outscored their opponents, 323–309, and finished the regular season with a 9–7 record, the worst ever by a team who advanced to the Super Bowl (that record was later tied by the Arizona Cardinals in Super Bowl XLIII and the New York Giants in Super Bowl XLVI). The team was plagued with injuries during the regular season, including the loss of their starting quarterback Pat Haden. His replacement, Vince Ferragamo, completed less than 50 percent of his passes and threw twice as many interceptions (10) as touchdowns (5). But he still led the Rams to victory in 6 of their last 7 games.

The Rams gained 6,060 total yards of offense during the regular season, ranking second in the league. The team's main offensive weapon was halfback Wendell Tyler, who despite not becoming the starter until week 5, rushed for a team leading 1,109 yards, caught 32 passes for 308 yards, and scored 10 touchdowns. Tyler's rushing yards came off just 218 rushing attempts, giving him a league-leading 5.1 yards per carry average. Fullback Cullen Bryant provided Tyler with excellent blocking while also gaining 846 total yards and scoring 5 touchdowns. Wide receiver Preston Dennard was the team's main deep threat, catching 43 passes for 766 yards and 4 touchdowns. The offensive line, led by tackles Doug France and Jackie Slater, guard Dennis Harrah, and Pro Bowl center Rich Saul, paved the Rams' running attack to 4th in the NFC during the season despite injuries. They also gave up only 29 sacks.

But the Rams' main strength was their defense, which featured defensive end Jack Youngblood, who made the Pro Bowl for the 7th year in a row and was playing with a broken leg, and lightning-quick Fred Dryer on the opposite end. Behind them, the Rams had two outstanding linebackers: Jack "Hacksaw" Reynolds, and Jim Youngblood (no relation to Jack), who had recorded 5 interceptions and returned 2 of them for touchdowns. The Rams also had a solid secondary, led by free safety Nolan Cromwell, who also grabbed 5 interceptions. On November 4, 1979, the Rams' defense established a still-current NFL record by holding the Seattle Seahawks' offense to a total of minus 7 yards for the game; the Seahawks finished the 1979 season 4th in the league in points scored.

=== Pittsburgh Steelers ===
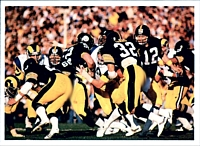
Bradshaw (12) handing F. Harris (32) the ball in Super Bowl XIV

The Steelers won the AFC Central with a 12–4 regular season record (including 8–0 at home), and advanced to their second consecutive Super Bowl and their fourth appearance in the last six seasons. Pittsburgh appeared to be even better than what they were in their three previous Super Bowl victories. They led the league with 6,258 yards in total offense, an average of 391 yards per game and just 31 yards short of an NFL record. The team also led the league in scoring with 416 points.

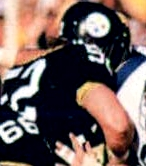
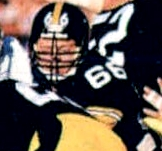
The Steelers owned one of the league's best offensive lines in 1979, led by Mike Webster (left) and included others such as Ted Petersen (right).

Pittsburgh quarterback Terry Bradshaw had another fine season as the leader of the Steelers offense, throwing for 3,724 yards and 26 touchdowns during the regular season (but he did throw 25 interceptions). Wide receiver John Stallworth was his top target with 70 receptions for 1,183 yards and 8 touchdowns, while wide receiver Lynn Swann caught 41 passes for 808 yards, an average of 19.7 yards per catch. Steelers starting tight end Bennie Cunningham, who missed most of the previous season due to injuries, was also a big contributor with 36 receptions for 512 yards. Fullback Franco Harris was the Steelers' leading rusher for the 8th consecutive season with 1,186 yards and 11 touchdowns. He also recorded his 7th consecutive season with more than 1,000 yards, tying an NFL record set by Jim Brown. Harris also had his best year as a receiver out of the backfield, recording career-highs of 36 receptions for 291 yards and another touchdown. Halfback Rocky Bleier also had another superb season, providing Harris with excellent blocking while also contributing 711 combined rushing and receiving yards. And running back Sidney Thornton also emerged as a big threat with 816 total yards and averaging 5 yards per carry. Pittsburgh also had a solid offensive line, led by center Mike Webster. The Steelers' offense did lead the NFL with a staggering 52 turnovers in the regular season, a trend that would continue in Super Bowl XIV.

The Steelers' "Steel Curtain" defense finished the regular season as the top rated defense in the AFC, limiting opponents to only 4,621 offensive yards. Up front, linemen Joe Greene and L. C. Greenwood terrorized opposing quarterbacks and rushers. And linebackers Jack Lambert and Jack Ham excelled at run stopping and pass coverage, combining for 8 interceptions. The Steelers also had a fine secondary, led by defensive backs Mel Blount, who recorded 3 interceptions, and Donnie Shell, who had 5.

=== Playoffs ===
In the playoffs, the Rams avenged the previous year's NFC Championship Game shutout loss to the Dallas Cowboys by beating them 21–19. Later, they beat the Tampa Bay Buccaneers in the NFC Championship Game, 9–0, scoring only three field goals.

Meanwhile, the Steelers went on to defeat the Miami Dolphins, 34–14, and the Houston Oilers, 27–13, in the playoffs. During those two playoff games, the Pittsburgh defense limited running backs Larry Csonka and Earl Campbell, respectively, to a combined total of only 35 rushing yards. Campbell was the league's rushing leader during the regular season with 1,697 yards, but could only gain 15 yards against the Steelers in the AFC Championship Game.

=== Super Bowl pregame news and notes ===
Pittsburgh was heavily favored to win Super Bowl XIV and become the first team to win 4 Super Bowls. Most people did not think that the Rams even belonged on the same field with the Steelers. In fact, Sports Illustrated had called the NFC Championship Game "a game for losers, played by losers". One sports writer sarcastically suggested that Bradshaw throw left-handed and the Rams should be allowed to play with 12 men on the field to make the Super Bowl more competitive.

However, the Steelers were not taking their opponents lightly. In their previous meetings, the Rams held a 12–1–2 all-time record over the Steelers, including wins in 1971, 1975, and 1978. The wins in 1975 (by a score of 10–3) and 1978 (by a score of 10–7) were over Steeler teams that eventually won the Super Bowl those seasons. Also, the Steelers had shown clear signs of weakness when playing away from their home stadium during the season. Their first loss of the year was on the road in a 4-turnover performance against the Philadelphia Eagles. Two weeks later at 5–1, Pittsburgh was blown out 34–10 in Cincinnati against an 0–6 Bengals team. In week 12, the team lost 8 turnovers (which included Bradshaw's 5 interceptions) in a 35–7 loss on the road against the San Diego Chargers.

Bradshaw became the second quarterback to start four Super Bowls, joining his counterpart from Super Bowls X and XIII Roger Staubach. Joe Montana became the third to start four Super Bowls, but all were passed by John Elway and Tom Brady, and also matched by Jim Kelly, Peyton Manning, and Patrick Mahomes.

The Rams became the first NFC West team to reach the Super Bowl. The NFC West was the last of the six post-merger divisions to reach the Super Bowl.

Super Bowl XIV holds the record for attendance with 103,985 spectators.

== Broadcasting ==
CBS televised the game in the United States with play-by-play announcer Pat Summerall and color commentator Tom Brookshier. Brent Musburger hosted CBS's pregame coverage with the NFL Today crew of Irv Cross (who joined Musburger in the Pittsburgh Steelers locker room), Jayne Kennedy (the only Super Bowl she would be part of covering for CBS), Jimmy "The Greek" Snyder and Jack Whitaker. One of the guest analysts for the network's pregame show was former Oakland Raiders coach John Madden; he impressed CBS executives so much that he eventually replaced Brookshier (who was promoted to play by play) as lead game analyst in 1981. George Allen also served as a second guest analyst. Filing remote reports from bars in the respect team's home markets were Paul Hornung in The Ginger Man in Beverly Hills (briefly joined by Jayne Kennedy's NFL Today predecessor Phyllis George and her then-husband, newly inaugurated Kentucky Governor John Y. Brown Jr. along with Houston Oilers quarterback Dan Pastorini) and Tim Ryan at the LeMont Restaurant in Pittsburgh (which included a brief shot of the newly redesigned Pittsburgh Penguins logo and uniform). Dick Stockton handled the Los Angeles Rams locker room interviews.

The national CBS Radio coverage featured Jack Buck and Hank Stram, with Musburger also working its pregame coverage. On local radio, Bob Starr and Al Wisk called the game for the Rams over KMPC in Los Angeles, while WTAE-AM in Pittsburgh featured the Steelers' play-by-play team of Jack Fleming and Myron Cope. The KMPC broadcast, thanks to an agreement with the Iranian militants, Iran's Ministry of National Guidance and KMPC reporter Alex Paen, would be recorded and played for the Americans held hostage in Iran.

The famous Coca-Cola commercial (titled "Hey Kid, Catch!") in which "Mean" Joe Greene gives a boy his game jersey aired during CBS' telecast of the game. However, it is technically not viewed as a Super Bowl ad since it actually debuted on October 1, 1979, not during the day of the game.

60 Minutes was CBS's Super Bowl lead-out program.

== Entertainment ==
The Los Angeles Unified School District All-City Band played during the pregame ceremonies. Later, actress and singer Cheryl Ladd performed the national anthem. The coin toss ceremony featured longtime Steelers owner Art Rooney.

The performance event group Up with People performed during the halftime show titled "A Salute to the Big Band Era".

This was the first of 9 consecutive Super Bowls to feature the football-style logo at the 35-yard line.

== Game summary ==
Despite being the underdogs, the Rams managed to hang onto a 13–10 lead at halftime, and a 19–17 lead at the beginning of the fourth quarter. But the Steelers held the Rams scoreless in the fourth quarter and scored two unanswered touchdowns for the win. Despite the game's uneven matchup and the final score, this game is regarded by some as one of the most competitive games in Super Bowl history. Overall, the lead changed seven times between both teams, a Super Bowl record (Pittsburgh took the lead 4 times, while Los Angeles took it 3 times).

=== First quarter ===
The Rams won the coin toss and took the opening kickoff, but the Steel Curtain defense forced a three-and-out. Then on the Steelers' seventh play of their first possession, quarterback Terry Bradshaw completed a 32-yard pass to running back Franco Harris to reach the Los Angeles 26-yard line. But a deep third down pass intended for wide receiver Lynn Swann fell incomplete, forcing Pittsburgh to settle for a 41-yard field goal by kicker Matt Bahr, giving them an early 3–0 lead.

Bahr's ensuing kickoff was very short, giving Los Angeles great field position at their own 41-yard line. On the first play of the drive, running back Wendell Tyler caught a 6-yard pass from quarterback Vince Ferragamo. Then on the next play, Tyler took a handoff, ran left, broke several tackles, and ran 39 yards to the Steelers 14 before he was finally taken down by safety Donnie Shell. This was the longest run against the Steelers all season. Shell saved the touchdown by making the tackle after previously being knocked to the turf 5 yards past the line of scrimmage. Six plays later, however, running back Cullen Bryant scored on a 1-yard touchdown run to give the Rams their first lead of the game, 7–3. The score was the first time the Steelers allowed a rushing touchdown during a Super Bowl in franchise history.

But the lead did not last long. Pittsburgh cornerback/kick returner Larry Anderson returned the ensuing kickoff 45 yards to his own 47, and then the Steelers marched 53 yards in 9 plays using every offensive weapon in their arsenal. First, Harris ran for 12 yards, running back Rocky Bleier ran for 1, then tight end Bennie Cunningham caught a pass for 8. Bleier ran again for 2, followed by Bradshaw's 12-yard completion to Swann to end the first quarter.

=== Second quarter ===
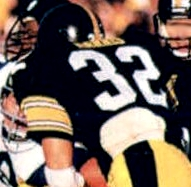
Harris scored two touchdowns and led the team in rushing with 46 yards during the game.

The second period opened with Bradshaw's 13-yard completion to Cunningham to reach the Los Angeles 5-yard line, and then Harris ran through the middle to the 4. Wide receiver John Stallworth was then stopped at the 1-yard line, but then Harris ran to the right untouched and scored a touchdown on the next play, putting the Steelers back in front with a 10–7 lead. Harris' touchdown run, his third in Super Bowl play, broke the previous record of two set by Elijah Pitts in Super Bowl I and by the Butch and Sundance Duo of Jim Kiick and Larry Csonka in Super Bowls VII and VIII (Kiick rushed for a touchdown in both games while Csonka scored twice in VIII en route to winning that game's MVP award).

However, like the Rams' previous lead, the Steelers' lead also turned out to be short-lived. Aided by Ferragamo's 12-yard pass to running back Lawrence McCutcheon and a 20-yard pass interference penalty against Shell, Los Angeles advanced 67 yards in 10 plays to score a 31-yard field goal by kicker Frank Corral to tie the game at 10. Anderson gave the Steelers great field position after returning the ensuing kickoff 38 yards to the Pittsburgh 46-yard line, but the Steelers could not move the ball and had to punt. The Rams were also forced to punt on their next possession after only gaining 6 yards. On third down, Ferragamo completed a pass to tight end Terry Nelson, who then appeared to fumble the ball while getting tackled by Shell, but the officials ruled Nelson down before the ball came out of his hands. On the first play of the Steelers' next drive, Los Angeles safety Dave Elmendorf intercepted a pass from Bradshaw and returned it 10 yards to the Pittsburgh 39.

On the first two plays after the turnover, Ferragamo was sacked for a 10-yard loss by linebacker Robin Cole and threw an incomplete pass. But he managed to overcome the situation with a 12-yard completion to Bryant on third down and a 10-yard completion to wide receiver Billy Waddy on 4th-and-8. Ferragamo's next pass was a 14-yard completion to Nelson for a first down at the 13, but after throwing two incompletions, Pittsburgh defensive end John Banaszak sacked Ferragamo on third down for a 12-yard loss. However, Corral kicked a 45-yard field goal to give the Rams a 13–10 halftime lead.

=== Third quarter ===
The heavily favored Steelers trailed at the end of the half. "How can you mess up this way?" Steelers assistant coach Woody Widenhofer asked his team at halftime. "Didn't we go over these things a dozen times? You guys are standing out there like statues."

Anderson once again gave the Steelers great starting field position, returning the opening kickoff of the second half 37 yards to the Pittsburgh 39-yard line. The Steelers lulled the Rams defense by running the ball on three consecutive plays of the drive, and then Bradshaw burned them with a 47-yard touchdown completion to Swann, who made a leaping catch at the Los Angeles 2 and tumbled into the end zone to give Pittsburgh a 17–13 lead.

Again, the Steelers' lead did not last long. After the first two plays of the Rams' ensuing drive, Ferragamo completed a 51-yard pass to Waddy. Then on the next play, Ferragamo handed the ball off to McCutcheon, who started to run to the right. The Steelers' defense came up to tackle him behind the line of scrimmage, only to watch him throw a 24-yard touchdown pass to wide receiver Ron Smith. Corral missed the extra point attempt wide left, but the Rams had retaken the lead, 19–17.

The Steelers had some success advancing into Rams territory on their next two possessions, only to see the Rams intercept the ball both times. On Pittsburgh's next drive, Bradshaw completed a 14-yard pass to Harris, but then threw a deep pass that was intercepted at the Los Angeles 27 by safety Eddie Brown, who then lateraled to cornerback Pat Thomas to gain an additional 7 yards and give the Rams a first down at their own 38. Then after forcing Los Angeles to punt, the Steelers drove all the way to the Rams 16-yard line on a 19-yard reception by Harris and a 23-yard reception by wide receiver Sidney Thornton, but then after two running plays ended with no gain, Elmendorf deflected a pass intended for Stallworth that was intercepted by cornerback Rod Perry, giving the ball back to the Rams at their own 4-yard line. On the first play of the drive, Los Angeles managed to escape a game-tying safety with a 12-yard run by Tyler to end the third quarter with the Rams still in the lead, 19–17, seemingly in control of the game. To make matters worse for the Steelers, prior to Brown's interception, Pittsburgh lost Swann to injury, when he was knocked out of the game by Thomas.

=== Fourth quarter ===
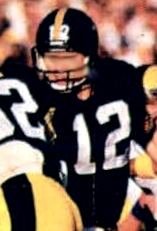
Bradshaw, who passed for 309 yards and two touchdowns, was named Super Bowl MVP.

After being forced to punt to start the final period, with 12:59 left in the game, Rams punter Ken Clark's 59-yard punt planted Pittsburgh back to their own 25-yard line. Then faced with 3rd-and-8, Steelers head coach Chuck Noll called for "60 prevent slot hook and go", a play that the team had practiced all week and couldn't complete it. Before Bradshaw went back on the field, Noll told him to "go deep and get the big play, because they're going to take away high percentage passing". Bradshaw took the snap, dropped back, and then threw a pass to Stallworth, who was running a streak pattern down the middle of the field. Stallworth caught the ball barely beyond the outstretched hand of Perry and took it all the way to the end zone for a 73-yard touchdown to make the score 24–19 in favor of the Steelers. When being interviewed for the documentary series America's Game, Stallworth said that Bradshaw had overthrown him and departed his planned route and simply ran towards the goal line. The NFL Films highlight film notes that Brown was supposed to help Perry in covering Stallworth, but for some reason, Brown ignored the Steeler receiver. On the ensuing kickoff, the Rams tried a reverse, with running back Eddie Hill handing the ball off to fullback Jim Jodat, which resulted in poor field position for the Rams at their own 14.

After an exchange of punts, the Rams were given one more chance for a spirited game-winning drive. Ferragamo smartly moved the Rams down the field, completing 3 out of 4 passes around runs by Tyler, including a 24-yard pass to wide receiver Preston Dennard. His 14-yard completion to Waddy on 3rd-and-13 moved the Rams to the Pittsburgh 32-yard line with just under 6 minutes remaining. However, on the following play, Ferragamo made his first and only mistake of the game; despite the fact that Waddy had broken free down the right side of the field, Ferragamo had zeroed in on Ron Smith down the middle of the field but did not notice Steelers linebacker Jack Lambert playing behind Smith. As Ferragamo released the ball, Lambert jumped in front of Smith and intercepted the pass with 5:24 remaining.

When faced with 3rd-and-7 on Pittsburgh's ensuing drive, Bradshaw once again made a crucial long pass completion to Stallworth, this time a 44-yard completion to the Los Angeles 22-yard line, barely beyond the outstretched hand of Perry. Stallworth's clutch catch, his third and final reception of the game, came off the same play that he scored the touchdown on and just like before Bradshaw misjudged Stallworth and instead underthrew him. During the same America's Game interview, Stallworth said if Bradshaw threw it out a little more, they could have scored again. Two plays later, a pass interference penalty on Thomas in the end zone gave the Steelers a first down at the 1-yard line. The Rams managed to keep Bleier and Harris out of the end zone for the first two plays, but Harris then scored on a third-down, 1-yard touchdown run to give the Steelers a 31–19 lead and cement their fourth Super Bowl title. The Rams responded by driving to Pittsburgh's 37-yard line, but ended up turning over the ball on downs with 39 seconds remaining, and the Steelers ran out the clock to end the game.

=== Aftermath ===
The city of Pittsburgh celebrated its third major pro championship in 13 months. The Steelers had also won the previous year's Super Bowl, and the city's Major League Baseball team, the Pirates, had won the World Series three months before this Super Bowl game. Ten days after the Steelers' Super Bowl victory, the city's National Hockey League team, the Pittsburgh Penguins, changed its uniform colors to match the black and gold scheme of the Pirates and Steelers, as well as that of the Pittsburgh city flag.

This was the third time in Super Bowl history that a team overcame a deficit entering the fourth quarter to win the game. The Baltimore Colts entered the final quarter down 13–6 against Dallas in Super Bowl V and won the game 16–13. The Pittsburgh Steelers started the final period against Dallas in Super Bowl X down 10–7 and eventually won the game 21–17. The lead had changed hands seven times, a Super Bowl record to this day. Pittsburgh took the lead four times, while Los Angeles took it three times. Franco Harris, Lynn Swann, and John Stallworth became the fourth, fifth and sixth players to score touchdowns in back-to-back Super Bowls, respectively. They had to celebrate when Swann returned from the hospital after being injured.

Ferragamo finished the game with 15 out of 25 completions for 212 yards, with 1 interception. Tyler was the top rusher of the game with 60 yards, and caught 2 passes for 20 yards. Waddy was the Rams leading receiver with 3 catches for 75 yards. Harris led the Steelers in rushing with 44 yards and 2 touchdowns, while also catching 3 passes for 66 yards. Stallworth was the top receiver of the game with 3 receptions for 121 yards and a touchdown, an average of 40.3 yards per catch. Swann had 5 catches for 79 yards and a touchdown. Larry Anderson set a Super Bowl record with 162 yards from his 5 kickoff returns.

The Rams would remain competitive in the 1980s but wouldn't reach another Super Bowl until their victory in Super Bowl XXXIV in January 2000, after the team had moved to St. Louis before the 1995 season. The closest the Los Angeles Rams would get to getting back to another Super Bowl in the 1980s, was in 1985, when they advanced to the NFC title game before falling to the eventual Super Bowl champion Chicago Bears, and in 1989; reaching the NFC Championship before losing to division rival and defending Super Bowl champion San Francisco. Following the loss in the 1989 NFC championship game, the Rams suffered through nine consecutive losing seasons and had the NFL's worst record of the 1990s until the 1999 championship season. They would make 2 Super Bowl appearances with the first being 2 years following their return to Los Angeles in 2016 in Super Bowl LIII, but fell to the New England Patriots by a score of 13–3, and their second being in Super Bowl LVI (which was also played in the Los Angeles area, albeit at their actual home stadium SoFi Stadium) where they defeated the Cincinnati Bengals by a score of 23–20.

Wendell Tyler eventually won a Super Bowl as a featured back for the San Francisco 49ers in 1984. 1984 was also Jack Youngblood's 14th and final season in the NFL. The last link of the 1979 team was Jackie Slater, who remained on the team until 1995, the club's first season in St. Louis. He set an NFL record by playing 20 seasons with one team, yet Super Bowl XIV remained his lone trip to the Big Game. Slater was the last Ram to have been a teammate of legendary defensive tackle Merlin Olsen, who anchored the Rams' Fearsome Foursome for 15 seasons (1962–76).

Pittsburgh would go 9–7 the following season and miss the playoffs. They would go 8–8 in 1981 before making the playoffs the next three seasons. Many of the links that powered the Steelers to their Super Bowl wins began to retire shortly after Super Bowl XIV, starting with Rocky Bleier in 1980 and Joe Greene in 1981. Ham spent all of 1982 on injured reserve before retiring. Bradshaw sat out all but one half of the 1983 season before retiring due to recurring elbow injuries, and Blount retired after that season as well. The Steelers were also haunted by their decision to pass on Dan Marino, the standout quarterback for the University of Pittsburgh, in the 1983 NFL draft. The Steelers' first-round selection of 1983, Texas Tech defensive tackle Gabriel Rivera, was paralyzed in an automobile accident after seven weeks of his rookie season. Terry Bradshaw would miss the first 14 games of the 1983 season due to an elbow injury. His final game was against the New York Jets which he started and led two touchdown drives before being forced out due to another elbow injury following a 10-yard TD pass to Calvin Sweeney.

Lambert was slowed throughout 1984 by a painful turf toe, retiring after that campaign. Stallworth, Webster, and Shell would play well into the 1980s and helped lead Pittsburgh to the 1984 AFC Championship game, where they lost to Marino's Miami Dolphins. But they would not reach a Super Bowl until the 1995 season, losing to the Dallas Cowboys 27–17 in Super Bowl XXX. Kicker Matt Bahr would win another Super Bowl with the New York Giants during the 1990 season. He kicked the game-winning field goal in Super Bowl XXV, and a week earlier booted the game-winning field goal against the San Francisco 49ers in the NFC Championship Game, thus denying the 49ers a chance at three straight Super Bowl victories and surpassing the Steelers' total of four Super Bowl titles. Chuck Noll, the last link to Pittsburgh's dynasty, retired from coaching following the 1991 season. Only Bill Belichick matched (and later surpassed) Noll's four Vince Lombardi Trophies as a head coach. The Steelers' record of four Super Bowls in six seasons has yet to be matched.

=== Box score ===
Super Bowl XIV: Pittsburgh Steelers 31, Los Angeles Rams 19

Quarter	1	2	3	4	Total
Rams (NFC)	7	6	6	0	19
Steelers (AFC)	3	7	7	14	31

at Rose Bowl, Pasadena, California

- Date: January 20, 1980
- Game time: 3:15 p.m. PST
- Game weather: 67 °F (19 °C), sunny

Scoring summary

Quarter	Time	Drive			Team	Scoring information	Score	
Quarter	Time	Plays	Yards	TOP	Team	Scoring information	LA	PIT
1	7:31	11	55	5:05	PIT	41-yard field goal by Matt Bahr	0	3
1	2:44	8	59	4:41	LA	Cullen Bryant 1-yard touchdown run, Frank Corral kick good	7	3
2	12:52	9	53	4:40	PIT	Franco Harris 1-yard touchdown run, Bahr kick good	7	10
2	7:21	11	67	5:23	LA	31-yard field goal by Corral	10	10
2	0:14	9	12	2:49	LA	45-yard field goal by Corral	13	10
3	12:12	5	61	2:48	PIT	Lynn Swann 47-yard touchdown reception from Terry Bradshaw, Bahr kick good	13	17
3	10:15	4	77	1:49	LA	Ron Smith 24-yard touchdown reception from Lawrence McCutcheon, Corral kick no good (wide left)	19	17
4	12:04	3	75	0:55	PIT	John Stallworth 73-yard touchdown reception from Bradshaw, Bahr kick good	19	24
4	1:49	7	70	3:35	PIT	Harris 1-yard touchdown run, Bahr kick good	19	31
"TOP" = time of possession. For other American football terms, see Glossary of American football.							19	31

== Final statistics ==
Sources: NFL.com Super Bowl XIV, Super Bowl XIV Play Finder Pit, Super Bowl XIV Play Finder LA

=== Statistical comparison ===
	Los Angeles Rams	Pittsburgh Steelers
First downs	16	19
First downs rushing	6	8
First downs passing	9	10
First downs penalty	1	1
Third down efficiency	6/16	9/14
Fourth down efficiency	1/2	0/0
Net yards rushing	107	84
Rushing attempts	29	37
Yards per rush	3.7	2.3
Passing – Completions/attempts	16/26	14/21
Times sacked-total yards	4–42	0–0
Interceptions thrown	1	3
Net yards passing	194	309
Total net yards	301	393
Punt returns-total yards	1–4	4–31
Kickoff returns-total yards	6–79	5–162
Interceptions-total return yards	3–21	1–16
Punts-average yardage	5–44.0	2–42.5
Fumbles-lost	0–0	0–0
Penalties-total yards	2–26	6–65
Time of possession	29:30	30:30
Turnovers	1	3

=== Individual statistics ===
Rams passing
	C/ATT^{1}	Yds	TD	INT	Rating
Vince Ferragamo	15/25	212	0	1	70.8
Lawrence McCutcheon	1/1	24	1	0	158.3
Rams rushing
	Car^{2}	Yds	TD	LG^{3}	Yds/Car
Wendell Tyler	17	60	0	39	3.53
Cullen Bryant	6	30	1	14	5.00
Lawrence McCutcheon	5	10	0	6	2.00
Vince Ferragamo	1	7	0	7	7.00
Rams receiving
	Rec^{4}	Yds	TD	LG^{3}	Target^{5}
Billy Waddy	3	75	0	50	5
Cullen Bryant	3	21	0	12	4
Wendell Tyler	3	20	0	11	3
Preston Dennard	2	32	0	24	5
Terry Nelson	2	20	0	14	3
Drew Hill	1	28	0	28	2
Ron Smith	1	24	1	24	3
Lawrence McCutcheon	1	16	0	16	1

Steelers passing
	C/ATT^{1}	Yds	TD	INT	Rating
Terry Bradshaw	14/21	309	2	3	101.9
Steelers rushing
	Car^{2}	Yds	TD	LG^{3}	Yds/Car
Franco Harris	20	46	2	12	2.30
Rocky Bleier	10	25	0	9	2.50
Terry Bradshaw	3	9	0	6	3.00
Sidney Thornton	4	4	0	5	1.00
Steelers receiving
	Rec^{4}	Yds	TD	LG^{3}	Target^{5}
Lynn Swann	5	79	1	47	6
John Stallworth	3	121	1	73	4
Franco Harris	3	66	0	32	3
Bennie Cunningham	2	21	0	13	3
Sidney Thornton	1	22	0	22	3
Jim Smith	0	0	0	0	1

^{1}Completions/attempts ^{2}Carries ^{3}Long gain ^{4}Receptions ^{5}Times targeted

=== Records set ===
The following records were set in Super Bowl XIV, according to the official NFL.com box score and the Pro-Football-Reference.com game summary.
Some records have to meet NFL minimum number of attempts to be recognized. The minimums are shown (in parentheses).

Player records set
Most points scored, career	24	Franco Harris (Pittsburgh)
Most touchdowns, career	4	Franco Harris (Pittsburgh)
Passing records
Highest passer rating, career, (40 attempts)	112.8	Terry Bradshaw (Pittsburgh)
Most passing yards, career	932	Terry Bradshaw (Pittsburgh)
Highest average gain, game (20 attempts)	14.71 yards (309–21)	Terry Bradshaw (Pittsburgh)
Highest average gain, career (40 attempts)	11.10 yards (932–84)	Terry Bradshaw (Pittsburgh)
Most touchdown passes, career	9	Terry Bradshaw (Pittsburgh)
Lowest percentage, passes had intercepted, career, (40 attempts)	See ^{Note*}	
Rushing records
Most yards, career	354	Franco Harris (Pittsburgh)
Most attempts, career	101	Franco Harris (Pittsburgh)
Most touchdowns, career	4	Franco Harris (Pittsburgh)
Receiving records
Most yards, career	364	Lynn Swann (Pittsburgh)
Most receptions, career	16	Lynn Swann (Pittsburgh)
Highest average gain, game (3 receptions)	40.33 yards (3–121)	John Stallworth (Pittsburgh)
Highest average gain, career (8 receptions)	24.4 yards (11–268)	John Stallworth (Pittsburgh)
Most touchdowns, career	3	John Stallworth; Lynn Swann (Pittsburgh)
Combined yardage records ^{†}
Most attempts, career	108	Franco Harris (Pittsburgh)
Most yards gained, career	468	Franco Harris (Pittsburgh)
Special Teams
Most kickoff returns, game	5	Larry Anderson (Pittsburgh)
Most kickoff returns, career	8	Larry Anderson (Pittsburgh)
Most kickoff return yards, game	162 yards	Larry Anderson (Pittsburgh)
Most kickoff return yards, career	205 yards	Larry Anderson (Pittsburgh)
Highest kickoff return average, game (3 returns)	32.4 yards (5–162)	Larry Anderson (Pittsburgh)
Highest kickoff return average, career (4 returns)	25.6 yards (8–205)	Larry Anderson (Pittsburgh)
Records tied
Most touchdowns, game	2	Franco Harris
Most rushing touchdowns, game	2	Franco Harris
Most punt returns, career	6	Theo Bell (Pittsburgh)
Most 40-plus yard field goals, game	1	Matt Bahr (Pittsburgh); Frank Corral (Los Angeles)

^Note * Terry Bradshaw threw 3 interceptions in this game, increasing his career interception percentage in Super Bowls to 4.8%. This meant that Bart Starr once again held the record for "Lowest percentage, passes had intercepted, career, (40 attempts)" with 2.1% (1–47). Jim Plunkett would surpass this record in Super Bowl XVIII with 0.0% (0–46).

- † This category includes rushing, receiving, interception returns, punt returns, kickoff returns, and fumble returns.

Team records set
Most Super Bowl championship victories	4	Steelers
Passing
Most yards passing (net)	309	Steelers
Highest average yards gained per pass attempt	14.7 (309–21)	Steelers
Kickoff returns
Highest average gain, game (3 returns)	32.4 (162–5)	Steelers
Punting
Fewest punts, game	2	Steelers
Records tied
Most consecutive Super Bowl victories	2	Steelers
Most points scored, second half	21	Steelers
Most points, fourth quarter	14	Steelers
Fewest times sacked	0	Steelers

Turnovers are defined as the number of times losing the ball on interceptions and fumbles.

Records set, both team totals
	Total	Steelers	Rams
Passing, Both Teams
Most passing yards (net)	503	309	194
Fumbles, Both Teams
Fewest fumbles	0	0	0
Kickoff returns, Both Teams
Most kickoff returns	11	5	6
Most yards gained	241	162	79
Records tied, both team totals
Fewest fumbles lost	0	0	0
Fewest punts, game	7	2	5

== Starting lineups ==
Hall of Fame ‡

Los Angeles	Position	Pittsburgh
Offense
Billy Waddy	WR	John Stallworth‡
Doug France	LT	Jon Kolb
Kent Hill	LG	Sam Davis
Rich Saul	C	Mike Webster‡
Dennis Harrah	RG	Gerry Mullins
Jackie Slater‡	RT	Larry Brown
Terry Nelson	TE	Bennie Cunningham
Preston Dennard	WR	Lynn Swann‡
Vince Ferragamo	QB	Terry Bradshaw‡
Cullen Bryant	FB	Franco Harris‡
Wendell Tyler	HB	Rocky Bleier
Defense
Jack Youngblood‡	LE	L. C. Greenwood
Mike Fanning	LT	Joe Greene‡
Larry Brooks	RT	Gary Dunn
Fred Dryer	RE	John Banaszak
Jim Youngblood	LLB	Dennis Winston
Jack Reynolds	MLB	Jack Lambert‡
Bob Brudzinski	RLB	Robin Cole
Pat Thomas	LCB	Ron Johnson
Rod Perry	RCB	Mel Blount‡
Dave Elmendorf	SS	Donnie Shell‡
Nolan Cromwell	FS	J. T. Thomas

== Officials ==
- Referee: Fred Silva #7 first Super Bowl on field (alternate for IX)
- Umpire: Al Conway #7 second Super Bowl (IX)
- Head linesman: Burl Toler #18 first Super Bowl
- Line judge: Bob Beeks #16 first Super Bowl
- Back judge: Stan Javie #6 fourth Super Bowl (II, VIII, X)
- Side judge: Ben Tompkins #4 first Super Bowl
- Field judge: Charley Musser #19 second Super Bowl (IV)
- Alternate referee: Jerry Seeman #17 worked Super Bowls XXIII and XXV on field
- Alternate official: Norm Kragseth #16 (line judge) only Super Bowl assignment

NOTE: Officials were numbered separately by position from 1979 to 1981. In 1982, the league reverted to the pre-1979 practice of assigning each official a different number.

This was the first Super Bowl officiating crew with two African-Americans (Toler and Beeks).

Stan Javie became the second man to officiate four Super Bowls, joining Jack Fette, whose fourth assignment was Super Bowl XIII.
