= Fred Silva =

American football official (1927–2004)

- Born: October 18, 1927; Oakland, California, U.S.
- Died: December 3, 2004 (aged 77); Palo Alto, California, U.S.
- Education: San José State University
- Occupation: NFL official (1968–1988)

Fred Silva (October 18, 1927 – December 3, 2004) was an American football official in the National Football League (NFL) for 21 seasons from 1968 to 1988. Silva was widely known for his coolness under fire on the football field and clapping his hand together when signaling a first down. The pinnacle of Silva's officiating career in the NFL was being assigned to Super Bowl XIV in 1980. On the field, Silva wore three different uniform numbers. In the 1968 and 1969, seasons, Silva wore uniform number 49, but changed to number 81 in 1970, which he wore until 1978. Finally, from 1979 until the end of his career in 1988, he wore the number 7.

== Biography ==
Silva graduated in 1945 from Castlemont High School in Oakland where he played quarterback on the school's football team and earned all-state honors.

After completing high school, Silva joined the United States Marine Corps and was honorably discharged a year later in 1946. Following his service in the military, Silva attended San Jose State University, graduating with a bachelor's degree in education in March 1950. At San Jose State, Silva played football and was a running back and linebacker.

Silva became first athletic director at San Jose City College and he coached football, basketball, baseball, and track teams during his tenure at the school. He led the football team to four championships during the 1950s and coached notable players that eventually played in the NFL such as Oakland Raiders quarterback Chon Gallegos and Chicago Bears offensive lineman Jim Cadile.

Following his coaching career, Silva began a career in officiating. Silva worked football, basketball, and baseball games as an official. He spent several years officiating at the collegiate level in the Pac-8 (now known as the Pac-12). In the Pac-8, Silva officiated basketball games involving Lew Alcindor (better known as Kareem Abdul-Jabbar), who played for the University of California, Los Angeles (UCLA) Bruins from 1965 to 1969.

Silva joined the NFL in 1967 as a line judge on legendary referee Tommy Bell's officiating crew and was promoted to referee in 1969. The highlight of Silva's career was being selected as referee for Super Bowl XIV between the Los Angeles Rams and Pittsburgh Steelers in 1980. He would retire following the 1988 NFL season.

Silva and Jack Fette, another NFL official, sued the league for age discrimination in 1992. They accused the NFL of grading officials over age 60 more strictly than their younger colleagues. He and Fette split a cash settlement with the league. In an ironic situation, Fette finished his career in the NFL with a Super Bowl assignment, his fifth, during the 1987 NFL season after grading out with a perfect season. Fette stayed on for the next four seasons as an instant replay official.

Silva died on December 3, 2004, at the age of 77 in Palo Alto, California. His death was attributed to congestive heart failure.

A lifelong friend of Silva said, "Fred had a great sense of humor and a razor-sharp wit, which occasionally served him well in tense situations during NFL games. He was also a mentor to many younger people interested in athletics as a career choice."

== Memorable games ==
Silva was the referee for the 1981 AFC Championship Game between the San Diego Chargers and Cincinnati Bengals at Cincinnati's Riverfront Stadium. The game was played under the coldest wind chill temperature in NFL history. Air temperature was -9 °F (-23 °C), but the wind chill was -59 °F (-51 °C). The game would later become known in NFL lore as the "Freezer Bowl".
