= Robin Cole =

American football player (born 1955)

No. 56, 90
- Positions: Linebacker, defensive end

Personal information
- Born: September 11, 1955 (age 71); Los Angeles, California, U.S.
- Listed height: 6 ft 2 in (1.88 m)
- Listed weight: 220 lb (100 kg)

Career information
- High school: Compton (Compton, California)
- College: New Mexico
- NFL draft: 1977: 1st round, 21st overall pick

Career history
- Pittsburgh Steelers (1977–1987); New York Jets (1988)

Awards and highlights
- 2× Super Bowl champion (XIII, XIV); All-Pro (1984); Pro Bowl (1984); Second-team All-American (1976); WAC Lineman of the Year (1976); New Mexico Sports Hall of Fame; Member of the 20-Year All-WAC Team; Albuquerque Press Hall of Fame

Career NFL statistics
- Sacks: 19.5
- Interceptions: 5
- Interception yards: 79
- Stats at Pro Football Reference

Robin Cole (born September 11, 1955) is an American former professional football player who was a linebacker in the National Football League (NFL), primarily with the Pittsburgh Steelers and later with the New York Jets. He played college football for the New Mexico Lobos.

== Early life and college ==
Cole was the seventh of ten children born to Obediah and Georgia Mae Cole. He attended high school at Compton High School, graduating in 1973. His cousin, Willie Davis, was a Hall of Fame defensive end for the Green Bay Packers who won five NFL titles and the first two Super Bowls.

He furthered his education at the University of New Mexico where he became an All American and the first person to be a first round draft pick out of the university.

== Professional career ==
He was selected by the Pittsburgh Steelers in the first round with the 21st overall pick in the first round of the 1977 NFL draft. At Pittsburgh, he was a part of the Steel Curtain defense, replacing Andy Russell as right outside linebacker. He played linebacker and defensive end for eleven seasons for the Pittsburgh Steelers.

Cole played in two Super Bowls – Super Bowl XIII and Super Bowl XIV. Mr. Cole was in the starting lineup in Super Bowl XIV in January 1980 and was elected to the Pro Bowl in 1984. He was runner up for MVP in Super Bowl XIV, finishing behind Terry Bradshaw.

He played one season, 1988, with the New York Jets.

== Post-football career ==
Since leaving the NFL after the 1988 season, Cole has served as a public speaker to corporate groups, business sales teams, sports teams, churches, schools and prisons. He has been a keynote speaker and emcee for many events, drawing on a message of inspiration and motivation as a cancer survivor.

Cole is an entrepreneur and trained at the Ford Motor Institute to be a dealer. He and his brother Erick also operated a cheesecake company, Unforgettable Sweets, in Canton Township, Pennsylvania, which opened in 2005.

In addition, he has served on several charitable boards, including the American Heart Association, The March of Dimes, Big Brothers/Big Sisters and others. He is a lifetime member of the NAACP.

Cole was diagnosed with prostate cancer in 2004, a disease that afflicted him and his two brothers, and eventually led to the death of father Obediah at age 50, and Obediah's twin brother – Robin's uncle – Ahab. As a result of the diagnosis (which Cole survived), he became the co-founder and president of the Obediah Cole Foundation, which has also been cited as the Robin Cole Foundation for Prostate Cancer.
