= Calvin Sweeney =

American football player (born 1955)

No. 85
- Position: Wide receiver

Personal information
- Born: January 12, 1955 (age 71); Riverside, California, U.S.
- Listed height: 6 ft 2 in (1.88 m)
- Listed weight: 190 lb (86 kg)

Career information
- College: USC
- NFL draft: 1979: 4th round, 110th overall pick

Career history
- Pittsburgh Steelers (1979–1987)

Awards and highlights
- Super Bowl champion (XIV); National champion (1978)

Career NFL statistics
- Receptions: 113
- Receiving yards: 1,775
- Receiving touchdowns: 7
- Stats at Pro Football Reference

Calvin Eugene Sweeney (born January 12, 1955) is an American former professional football player who was a wide receiver in the National Football League (NFL) for the Pittsburgh Steelers. He won Super Bowl XIV as a member of the Steelers. He played football at Perris High in Perris, California, before playing college football for the USC Trojans. He is noted for having caught the last pass thrown by Steelers Hall of Fame quarterback Terry Bradshaw for a touchdown on December 10, 1983.
