= Donnie Shell =

American football player (born 1952)

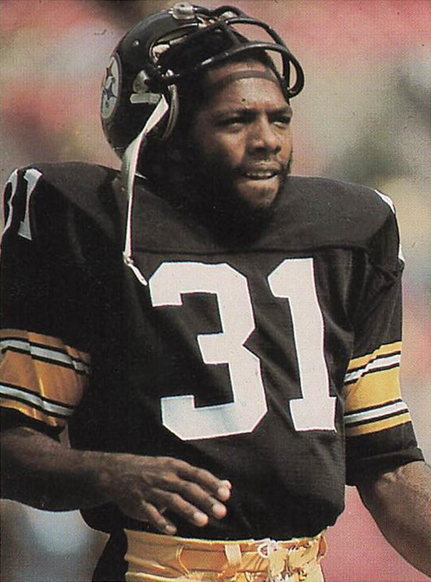
- Shell on a 1982 card

No. 31
- Position: Safety

Personal information
- Born: August 26, 1952 (age 74); Whitmire, South Carolina, U.S.
- Listed height: 5 ft 11 in (1.80 m)
- Listed weight: 190 lb (86 kg)

Career information
- High school: Whitmire
- College: South Carolina State
- NFL draft: 1974: undrafted

Career history
- Pittsburgh Steelers (1974–1987)

Awards and highlights
- 4× Super Bowl champion (IX, X, XIII, XIV); 3× First-team All-Pro (1979, 1980, 1982); 2× Second-team All-Pro (1978, 1981); 5× Pro Bowl (1978–1982); Pittsburgh Steelers All-Time Team; Pittsburgh Steelers Hall of Honor

Career NFL statistics
- Interceptions: 51
- Interception yards: 490
- Fumble recoveries: 19
- Defensive touchdowns: 4
- Stats at Pro Football Reference
- Pro Football Hall of Fame
- College Football Hall of Fame

Donnie Shell (born August 26, 1952) is an American former professional football player who was a safety for the Pittsburgh Steelers of the National Football League (NFL) between 1974 and 1987. Shell was a member of the Steelers famed Steel Curtain defense in the 1970s.

Shell retired as the NFL strong safety career leader in interceptions with 51. He started 11 consecutive seasons for the Steelers and was selected to the Steelers All-Time Team, College Football Hall of Fame, Pro Football Hall of Fame, and NFL Silver Anniversary Super Bowl Team.

== Early life and college ==
Shell grew up in the town of Whitmire, South Carolina. He played on the Whitmire High School football team, where in his senior season as a linebacker, his team did not allow a single touchdown by opponents. Shell played college football for Willie Jeffries at South Carolina State University, where he was teammates with future New York Giants and Hall of Fame linebacker Harry Carson and earned All-American and all conference honors. He was inducted into the College Football Hall of Fame in 1998. Shell was signed undrafted by the Steelers, where he played his entire career, winning four Super Bowls with the Steeler teams of the 1970s.

Shell is a member of Groove Phi Groove.

== Professional career ==
Shell was a five-time Pro Bowler between 1978 and 1982, a five-time All-Pro selection, and was the Steelers team MVP in 1980. He saved several possible touchdowns in Super Bowl XIII and Super Bowl XIV. He had been in the top 15 in balloting for the Pro Football Hall of Fame once before, in 2002 but with no success. The Professional Football Researchers Association named Shell to the PFRA Hall of Very Good Class of 2013.

In 2019, despite not being in the Pro Football Hall of Fame, he was chosen as a finalist for the NFL's 100th Anniversary All-Time Team.

Shell was the Carolina Panthers director of player development from 1994 to 2009.

He played in 201 games for the Steelers, fifth most in franchise history behind Ben Roethlisberger (249), Mike Webster (220), Hines Ward (217), and Cameron Heyward (211).

On January 15, 2020, Shell was announced as a member of the Pro Football Hall of Fame's Centennial Class of 2020. He was inducted by Tony Dungy, one of Shell's teammates on the Steelers and later a Hall of Fame coach.

== Post-retirement ==
Shell previously served as Director of Spiritual Life at Johnson C. Smith University in Charlotte, North Carolina. He currently lives in Rock Hill, South Carolina, and has three children and three grandchildren.
