= Ron Johnson (cornerback) =

American football player (1956–2018)

No. 29
- Position: Cornerback

Personal information
- Born: June 8, 1956; Detroit, Michigan, U.S.
- Died: July 10, 2018 (aged 62)
- Listed height: 5 ft 10 in (1.78 m)
- Listed weight: 200 lb (91 kg)

Career information
- High school: Northwestern (MI)
- College: Eastern Michigan
- NFL draft: 1978: 1st round, 22nd overall pick

Career history
- Pittsburgh Steelers (1978–1984)

Awards and highlights
- 2× Super Bowl champion (XIII, XIV); PFWA All-Rookie Team (1978); Third-team All-American (1977); 2× First-team All-MAC (1976, 1977)

Career NFL statistics
- Interceptions: 13
- Fumble recoveries: 3
- Touchdowns: 1
- Stats at Pro Football Reference

Ronald Johnson (June 8, 1956 – July 10, 2018) was an American professional football player who was a cornerback for seven seasons with the Pittsburgh Steelers of the National Football League (NFL).

== Biography ==
Johnson was a 1974 graduate of Detroit's Northwestern High School; he played collegiate football for Eastern Michigan University. Ron Johnson was selected by the Steelers in the first-round of the 1978 NFL draft.

He is one of at least 345 NFL players to be diagnosed after death with chronic traumatic encephalopathy (CTE), which is caused by repeated hits to the head.
