= Larry Anderson (American football) =

American football player (born 1956)

No. 30
- Positions: Cornerback; Return specialist

Personal information
- Born: September 25, 1956 (age 70); West Monroe, Louisiana, U.S.
- Listed height: 5 ft 11 in (1.80 m)
- Listed weight: 183 lb (83 kg)

Career information
- High school: Neville (Monroe, Louisiana)
- College: Louisiana Tech
- NFL draft: 1978: 4th round, 101st overall pick

Career history
- Pittsburgh Steelers (1978–1981); Baltimore/Indianapolis Colts (1982–1984)

Awards and highlights
- 2× Super Bowl champion (XIII, XIV); Third-team All-American (1977)

Career NFL statistics
- Games played: 82
- Starts: 13
- Interceptions: 2
- Punt returns: 20
- Punt return yards: 582
- Kick returns: 189
- Kick return yards: 4,217
- Stats at Pro Football Reference

Lawrence Andrew Anderson (born September 25, 1956) is an American former professional football player who was a cornerback and kick returner for seven seasons with the Pittsburgh Steelers and Baltimore/Indianapolis Colts of the National Football League (NFL). He played college football for the Louisiana Tech Bulldogs.

== Biography ==
Larry Anderson started his football career at Neville High School in Monroe, Louisiana, where he played running back and defensive back, while also returning kicks and punts, and was a member of the school's 1972 state championship team. He went on play college football at Louisiana Tech University. Joining the team as a walk on, he did not play in any games until his senior season in 1977. That year, Anderson was the nation's second-leading punt returner, with 44 punt returns for 441 yards and two touchdowns. He also returned 14 kickoffs for 435 yards (an average of 31.5 yards per return) and two scores, and intercepted five passes on defense. Anderson was selected to the College Football All-America Team and went on to be selected by the Steelers in the fourth round of the 1978 NFL draft.

Anderson played for the Steelers until 1981, primarily as a kickoff returner. In his rookie season, he was second in the NFL in kick return yardage, returning 37 kickoffs for 930 yards and a touchdown, assisting the team to a championship win in Super Bowl XIII. In the following season, the Steelers made it to Super Bowl XIV, where Anderson set a Super Bowl record with 5 kickoff returns for 162 yards in a 31–19 victory. In 1981, Anderson joined the Colts and spent three seasons with them before retiring. He finished his career with 75 punt returns for 587 yards, 189 kickoff returns for 4,217 yards and a touchdown, 2 interceptions, and 4 fumble recoveries, one of which he returned 41 yards for a touchdown.

Anderson was inducted into the Louisiana Tech University Athletic Hall of Fame in 1988.
