= Ted Petersen =

American football player (born 1955)

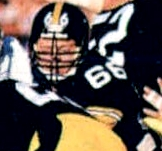
- Peterson with the Pittsburgh Steelers in 1980

No. 66, 71
- Position: Guard

Personal information
- Born: February 7, 1955 (age 71); Kankakee, Illinois, U.S.
- Listed height: 6 ft 5 in (1.96 m)
- Listed weight: 244 lb (111 kg)

Career information
- High school: Momence (Momence, Illinois)
- College: Eastern Illinois
- NFL draft: 1977: 4th round, 93rd overall pick

Career history
- Pittsburgh Steelers (1977–1983); Cleveland Browns (1984); Indianapolis Colts (1984); Pittsburgh Steelers (1987)

Awards and highlights
- 2× Super Bowl champion (XIII, XIV)

Career NFL statistics
- Games played: 94
- Games started: 34
- Fumble recoveries: 4
- Stats at Pro Football Reference

Ted Petersen (born February 7, 1955) is an American former professional football player who was an offensive lineman for nine seasons in the National Football League (NFL). He played college football for the Eastern Illinois Panthers. He played in the NFL for the Pittsburgh Steelers, Cleveland Browns, and Indianapolis Colts. Petersen is the former athletic director at Kankakee Community College in Kankakee, Illinois.
