= 1977 Pittsburgh Steelers season =

Pittsburgh Steelers 45th US football season

- Owner: Art Rooney
- Head coach: Chuck Noll
- Home stadium: Three Rivers Stadium

Results
- Record: 9–5
- Division place: 1st in AFC Central
- Playoffs: Lost Divisional Playoffs (at Broncos) 21–34
- All-Pros: 4: Joe Greene (1st team); Jack Ham (1st team); Franco Harris (1st team); Lynn Swann (2nd team)
- Pro Bowlers: 4: RB Franco Harris; LB Jack Ham; LB Jack Lambert; WR Lynn Swann
- Team MVP: Terry Bradshaw

The 1977 Pittsburgh Steelers season was the franchise's 45th in the National Football League (NFL). The 1977 Pittsburgh Steelers failed to improve on their 10–4 record from 1976 and finished with a 9–5 record; however, they appeared in the playoffs for their 6th straight season and won the AFC Central again. They had a hard time for most of the season as their record hovered around .500. Even the Steel Curtain seemed to have a little wear and tear allowing 243 points on the season, more than 100 more than the previous season. The sloppy plays would catch up with them in the Divisional Playoffs when they were knocked off by the Broncos 34–21 in Denver.

The 1977 season is remembered as one of the most turbulent in franchise history, as numerous players were involved with off-the-field issues. Defensive tackle Ernie Holmes was arrested for cocaine possession, and despite being found not guilty, lawsuits followed. Head coach Chuck Noll was also subject to a defamation lawsuit, as Oakland Raiders safety George Atkinson sued Noll and the Steelers for a disparaging comment in which Noll called Atkinson part of the "criminal element" in football. Though Atkinson lost the lawsuit, Noll was forced to bring Steelers cornerback Mel Blount into the suit, which upset Blount as he was one of many Steelers players engaged in a contract holdout, with others including linebacker Jack Lambert and safety Glen Edwards. Disputes between these players and Steelers owner Art Rooney were often publicized, and the overall drama played a significant part in the regression of the Steel Curtain defense. This was also the first season that the Steelers wore black face masks on their helmets.

== Offseason ==
=== NFL draft ===
1977 Pittsburgh Steelers draft
Round	Pick	Player	Position	College	Notes
1	21	Robin Cole *	Linebacker	New Mexico	
2	48	Sidney Thornton	Running back	Northwestern State	
3	60	Tom Beasley	Defensive lineman	Virginia Tech	
3	75	Jim Smith	Wide receiver	Michigan	
4	93	Ted Petersen	Guard	Eastern Illinois	
4	99	Laverne Smith	Running back	Kansas	
4	106	Dan Audick	Guard	Hawaii	
5	121	Cliff Stoudt	Quarterback	Youngstown State	
5	125	Steve Courson	Guard	South Carolina	
5	132	Dennis Winston	Linebacker	Arkansas	
Made roster * Made at least one Pro Bowl during career

=== Undrafted free agents ===
1977 undrafted free agents of note
Player	Position	College
Tony Dungy	Safety	Minnesota

== Personnel ==
=== Staff ===
1977 Pittsburgh Steelers staff
Front office: Chairman of the board – Arthur J. Rooney; President – Daniel M. Rooney; Vice president – John R. McGinley; Vice president – Arthur J. Rooney, Jr.; Public relations director – Ed Kiely; Traveling secretary – James A. Boston; Publicity director – Joe Gordon; Controller – Dennis P. Thimons; Ticket manager – Joseph H. Carr; Ticket office coordinator – Geraldine Glenn; Director of player personnel – Dick Haley; Assistant director of player personnel – Bill Nunn; Director of professional scouting – V. Timothy Rooney; Head coaches: Head coach – Chuck Noll; Offensive coaches: Offensive backfield – Dick Hoak; Receivers – Tom Moore; Offensive line – Dan Radakovich	Defensive coaches: Defensive coordinator – Bud Carson; Defensive line – George Perles; Linebackers – Woody Widenhofer; Strength and conditioning: Strength – Louis Riecke; Flexibility – Paul Uram; Team physician – David S. Huber; Team physician, orthopedic – Paul B. Steele, Jr.; Team dentist – George P. Boucek; Trainer – Ralph Berlin; Assistant trainer – Robert Milie; Equipment manager – Anthony Parisi; Field manager – Jack Hart; Film director – Bob McCartney; Photographer – Harry Homa

=== Roster ===
1977 Pittsburgh Steelers roster
Quarterbacks (QB): 12 Terry Bradshaw; 16 Neil Graff; 18 Cliff Stoudt; Running backs (RB): 20 Rocky Bleier; 35 Jack Deloplaine; 32 Franco Harris; 46 Reggie Harrison; 28 Alvin Maxson; 38 Sidney Thornton; Wide receivers (WR): 43 Frank Lewis; 85 Ernie Pough; 86 Jim Smith; 82 John Stallworth; 88 Lynn Swann; Tight ends (TE): 89 Bennie Cunningham; 84 Randy Grossman	Offensive linemen (OL): 79 Larry Brown T; 50 Jim Clack G; 57 Sam Davis G; 55 Jon Kolb T; 72 Gerry Mullins G; 66 Ted Petersen C; 74 Ray Pinney T; 52 Mike Webster C; Defensive linemen (DL): 64 Steve Furness DT/DE; 75 Joe Greene DT; 68 L. C. Greenwood DE; 63 Ernie Holmes DT; 78 Dwight White DE	Linebackers (LB): 56 Robin Cole MLB; 60 Brad Cousino OLB; 59 Jack Ham OLB; 54 Dave LaCrosse OLB; 58 Jack Lambert MLB; 51 Loren Toews OLB; 53 Dennis Winston MLB; Defensive backs (DB): 45 Jimmy Allen CB/S; 47 Mel Blount CB; 21 Tony Dungy SS; 27 Glen Edwards FS; 29 Brent Sexton CB; 31 Donnie Shell SS; 24 J. T. Thomas CB; Special teams (ST): 17 Rick Engles P; 10 Roy Gerela K	Reserve: 76 John Banaszak DE (IR); 65 Tom Beasley DT (IR); 83 Theo Bell WR (IR); 77 Steve Courson G (IR); 67 Gary Dunn DT (IR); 36 Wentford Gaines CB (IR); 15 Mike Kruczek QB (IR); 37 Laverne Smith RB (IR); -- Jimmy Stephens TE (IR); 39 Bobby Walden P (IR); 23 Mike Wagner S (IR); Rookies in italics

The Pittsburgh Steelers began the 1977 season looking to improve upon their 10–4 record in 1976; when they lost to the eventual Super Bowl champion Oakland Raiders.

While the Steelers once again won the AFC Central crown, they finished with one fewer win; going 9–5 and losing to the Denver Broncos in the AFC Divisional playoff game at Denver.

== Regular season ==
=== Schedule ===
Week	Date	Opponent	Kickoff (ET)	TV	Result	Record	Game Site
1	Mon. Sep. 19	San Francisco 49ers	9:00 p.m.	ABC	W 27–0	1–0	Three Rivers Stadium
2	Sun. Sep. 25	Oakland Raiders	4:00 p.m.	NBC	L 7–16	1–1	Three Rivers Stadium
3	Sun. Oct. 2	at Cleveland Browns	1:00 p.m.	NBC	W 28–14	2–1	Cleveland Municipal Stadium
4	Sun. Oct. 9	at Houston Oilers	2:00 p.m.	NBC	L 10–27	2–2	Astrodome
5	Mon. Oct. 17	Cincinnati Bengals	9:00 p.m.	ABC	W 20–14	3–2	Three Rivers Stadium
6	Sun. Oct. 23	Houston Oilers	1:00 p.m.	NBC	W 27–10	4–2	Three Rivers Stadium
7	Sun. Oct. 30	at Baltimore Colts	4:00 p.m.	NBC	L 21–31	4–3	Memorial Stadium
8	Sun. Nov. 6	at Denver Broncos	4:00 p.m.	NBC	L 7–21	4–4	Mile High Stadium
9	Sun. Nov. 13	Cleveland Browns	1:00 p.m.	NBC	W 35–31	5–4	Three Rivers Stadium
10	Sun. Nov. 20	Dallas Cowboys	4:00 p.m.	CBS	W 28–13	6–4	Three Rivers Stadium
11	Sun. Nov. 27	at New York Jets	1:00 p.m.	NBC	W 23–20	7–4	Shea Stadium
12	Sun. Dec. 4	Seattle Seahawks	1:00 p.m.	NBC	W 30–20	8–4	Three Rivers Stadium
13	Sat. Dec. 10	at Cincinnati Bengals	1:00 p.m.	NBC	L 10–17	8–5	Riverfront Stadium
14	Sun. Dec. 18	at San Diego Chargers	4:00 p.m.	NBC	W 10–9	9–5	San Diego Stadium

=== Game summaries ===
==== Week 1 (Monday September 19, 1977): vs. San Francisco 49ers ====
	1	2	3	4	Total
49ers	0	0	0	0	0
Steelers	0	10	3	14	27

at Three Rivers Stadium, Pittsburgh, Pennsylvania

- Game time: 9:00 pm EDT
- Game weather: 69 °F (21 °C), wind 9 mph (14 km/h)
- Game attendance: 48,046
- Referee: Bernie Ulman
- TV announcers: (ABC) Frank Gifford (play by play), Don Meredith & Howard Cosell (color commentators)

Scoring drives:

- Pittsburgh – Harris 14 run (Gerela kick)
- Pittsburgh – FG Gerela 49
- Pittsburgh – FG Gerela 47
- Pittsburgh – Harris 7 run (Gerela kick)
- Pittsburgh – Stallworth 15 pass from Bradshaw (Gerela kick)

==== Week 2 (Sunday September 25, 1977): vs. Oakland Raiders ====
	1	2	3	4	Total
Raiders	0	9	0	7	16
Steelers	0	0	0	7	7

at Three Rivers Stadium, Pittsburgh, Pennsylvania

- Game time: 4:00 pm EDT
- Game weather: 67 °F (19 °C), wind 9 mph (14 km/h)
- Game attendance: 50,398
- Referee: Pat Haggerty
- TV announcers: (NBC) Curt Gowdy (play by play), John Brodie (color commentator)

Scoring drives:

- Oakland – FG Mann 21
- Oakland – FG Mann 40
- Oakland – FG Mann 41
- Oakland – van Eeghen 8 run (Mann kick)
- Pittsburgh – Cunningham 43 pass from Bradshaw (Gerela kick)

==== Week 3 at Browns ====
Week Three: Pittsburgh Steelers (1–1) at Cleveland Browns (2–0)

Quarter	1	2	3	4	Total
Steelers	7	7	7	7	28
Browns	7	7	0	0	14

at Cleveland Municipal Stadium, Cleveland, Ohio

- Date: October 2
- Game time: 1:00 p.m.
- Game weather: 55 °F (13 °C)
- Game attendance: 80,588
- Referee: Fred Silva
- TV announcers (NBC): Curt Gowdy and Merlin Olsen
- Box Score

Game information

First quarter

- PIT – Lynn Swann 5-yard pass from Terry Bradshaw (Roy Gerela kick). Steelers 7–0. Drive:
- CLE – Dave Logan 22-yard pass from Brian Sipe (Don Cockroft kick). Tie 7–7. Drive:

Second quarter

- CLE – Cleo Miller 1-yard run (Don Cockroft kick). Browns 14–7. Drive:
- PIT – Frank Lewis 65-yard pass from Terry Bradshaw (Roy Gerela kick). Tie 14–14. Drive:

Third quarter

- PIT – Lynn Swann 14-yard pass from Terry Bradshaw (Roy Gerela kick). Steelers 21–14. Drive:

Fourth quarter

- PIT – Terry Bradshaw 1-yard run (Roy Gerela kick). Steelers 28–14. Drive:

Top passers

- PIT – Terry Bradshaw – 10/17, 143 yards, 3 TD, 2 INT
- CLE – Brian Sipe – 9/20, 81 yards, TD, INT

Top rushers

- PIT – Franco Harris – 22 rushes, 72 yards
- CLE – Cleo Miller – 11 rushes, 49 yards, TD

Top receivers

- PIT – Lynn Swann – 7 receptions, 71 yards, 2 TD
- CLE – Oscar Roan – 3 receptions, 43 yards

==== Week 4 (Sunday October 9, 1977): at Houston Oilers ====
	1	2	3	4	Total
Steelers	3	7	0	0	10
Oilers	7	0	10	10	27

at Astrodome, Houston, Texas

- Game time: 2:00 pm EDT
- Game attendance: 49,226
- Referee: Dick Jorgensen
- TV announcers: (NBC) Jack Buck (play by play), Jimmy Johnson (color commentator)

Scoring drives:

- Houston – Burrough 44 pass from Coleman (Fritsch kick)
- Pittsburgh – FG Gerela 27
- Pittsburgh – Bleier 1 run (Gerela kick)
- Houston – FG Fritsch 27
- Houston – Johnson 51 pass from Pastorini (Fritsch kick)
- Houston – Stemrick 5 fumble recovery return (Fritsch kick)
- Houston – FG Fritsch 18

==== Week 5 (Monday October 17, 1977): vs. Cincinnati Bengals ====
	1	2	3	4	Total
Bengals	0	7	0	7	14
Steelers	0	13	0	7	20

at Three Rivers Stadium, Pittsburgh, Pennsylvania

- Game time: 9:00 pm EDT
- Game weather: 39 °F (4 °C), wind 18 mph (29 km/h)
- Game attendance: 47,950
- Referee: Ben Dreith
- TV announcers: (ABC) Frank Gifford (play by play) and Don Meredith (color commentator)

Scoring drives:

- Pittsburgh – Bleier 1 run (Gerela kick)
- Pittsburgh – Bleier 2 run (kick failed)
- Cincinnati – Bujnoch 4 run (Bahr kick)
- Pittsburgh – Thornton 1 run (Gerela kick)
- Cincinnati – Williams recovered blocked punt in end zone (Bahr kick)

==== Week 6 (Sunday October 23, 1977): vs. Houston Oilers ====
	1	2	3	4	Total
Oilers	0	7	0	3	10
Steelers	0	7	6	14	27

at Three Rivers Stadium, Pittsburgh, Pennsylvania

- Game time: 1:00 pm EDT
- Game weather: 50 °F (10 °C), wind 12 mph (19 km/h)
- Game attendance: 48,517
- Referee: Bernie Ulman
- TV announcers: (NBC) Stu Nahan (play by play), Andy Russell (color commentator)

Scoring drives:

- Houston – Barber 5 pass from Pastorini (Fritsch kick)
- Pittsburgh – Harris 1 run (Gerela kick)
- Pittsburgh – Stallworth 49 pass from Bradshaw (kick failed)
- Houston – FG Fritsch 46
- Pittsburgh – Cunningham 2 pass from Bradshaw (Gerela kick)
- Pittsburgh – Harris 1 run (Gerela kick)

==== Week 7 (Sunday October 30, 1977): at Baltimore Colts ====
	1	2	3	4	Total
Steelers	0	0	7	14	21
Colts	3	14	7	7	31

at Memorial Stadium, Baltimore, Maryland

- Game time: 4:00 pm EST
- Game weather: 53 °F (12 °C), wind 8 mph (13 km/h)
- Game attendance: 60,225
- Referee: Red Cashion
- TV announcers: (NBC) Marv Albert (play by play), Len Dawson (color commentator)

Scoring drives:

- Baltimore – FG Linhart 24
- Baltimore – Leaks 26 pass from Jones (Linhart kick)
- Baltimore – Mitchell 13 pass from Jones (Linhart kick)
- Baltimore – Lee 25 run (Linhart kick)
- Pittsburgh – Swann 32 pass from Bradshaw (Gerela kick)
- Baltimore – Jones 6 run (Linhart kick)
- Pittsburgh – Harris 11 run (Gerela kick)
- Pittsburgh – Harris 3 run (Gerela kick)

==== Week 8 (Sunday November 6, 1977): at Denver Broncos ====
	1	2	3	4	Total
Steelers	0	0	7	0	7
Broncos	14	7	0	0	21

at Mile High Stadium, Denver, Colorado

- Game time: 4:00 pm EST
- Game weather: 52 °F (11 °C), wind 7 mph (11 km/h)
- Game attendance: 74,967
- Referee: Fred Wyant
- TV announcers: (NBC) Jim Simpson (play by play), Merlin Olsen (color commentator)

Scoring drives:

- Denver – Lytle 1 run (Turner kick)
- Denver – Upchurch 87 punt return (Turner kick)
- Denver – Moses 20 pass from Morton (Turner kick)
- Pittsburgh – Stallworth 4 pass from Bradshaw (Gerela kick)

==== Week 9 (Sunday November 13, 1977): vs. Cleveland Browns ====
	1	2	3	4	Total
Browns	3	0	7	21	31
Steelers	7	21	0	7	35

at Three Rivers Stadium, Pittsburgh, Pennsylvania

- Game time: 1:00 pm EST
- Game weather: 30 °F (−1 °C), wind 13 mph (21 km/h)
- Game attendance: 47,055
- Referee: Pat Haggerty
- TV announcers: (NBC) Jim Simpson (play by play), Merlin Olsen (color commentator)

Scoring drives:

- Cleveland – FG Cockroft 44
- Pittsburgh – Swann 39 pass from Bradshaw (Gerela kick)
- Pittsburgh – Bleier 2 run (Gerela kick)
- Pittsburgh – Stallworth 38 pass from Bradshaw (Gerela kick)
- Pittsburgh – Harris 16 run (Gerela kick)
- Cleveland – Miller 5 run (Cockroft kick)
- Pittsburgh – Stallworth 9 pass from Bradshaw (Gerela kick)
- Cleveland – Poole 5 pass from Mays (Cockroft kick)
- Cleveland – Poole 13 pass from Mays (Cockroft kick)
- Cleveland – Poole 3 pass from Mays (Cockroft kick)

==== Week 10 (Sunday November 20, 1977): vs. Dallas Cowboys ====
	1	2	3	4	Total
Cowboys	6	7	0	0	13
Steelers	0	14	14	0	28

at Three Rivers Stadium, Pittsburgh, Pennsylvania

- Game time: 4:00 pm EST
- Game weather: 48 °F (9 °C), wind 9 mph (14 km/h)
- Game attendance: 49,761
- Referee: Bob Frederic
- TV announcers: (CBS) Pat Summerall (play by play), Tom Brookshier (color commentator)

Scoring drives:

- Dallas – Dorsett 13 run (kick blocked)
- Pittsburgh – Harris 61 run (Gerela kick)
- Dallas – Saldi 23 pass from Staubach (Herrera kick)
- Pittsburgh – Swann 9 pass from Bradshaw (Gerela kick)
- Pittsburgh – Stallworth 28 pass from Bradshaw (Gerela kick)
- Pittsburgh – Harris 2 run (Gerela kick)

==== Week 11 at Jets ====
Week Eleven: Pittsburgh Steelers (6–4) at New York Jets (2–8)

Quarter	1	2	3	4	Total
Steelers	6	14	0	3	23
Jets	6	7	0	7	20

at Shea Stadium, Flushing, New York

- Date: November 27
- Game time: 1:00 p.m.
- Game weather: 31 °F (−1 °C)
- Game attendance: 47,385
- Referee: Jerry Markbreit
- TV announcers (NBC): Jim Simpson and Merlin Olsen
- Box Score

Game information

First quarter

- NYJ – Pat Leahy 33-yard field goal. Jets 3–0. Drive:
- PIT – John Stallworth 37-yard pass from Terry Bradshaw (kick blocked). Steelers 6–3. Drive:
- NYJ – Pat Leahy 47-yard field goal. Tie 6–6. Drive:

Second quarter

- PIT – Lynn Swann 5-yard pass from Terry Bradshaw (Roy Gerela kick). Steelers 13–6. Drive:
- NYJ – Scott Dierking 5-yard pass from Matt Robinson (Pat Leahy kick). Tie 13–13. Drive:
- PIT – Franco Harris 1-yard run (Roy Gerela kick). Steelers 20–13. Drive:

Third quarter

- No scoring

Fourth quarter

- PIT – Roy Gerela 37-yard field goal. Steelers 23–13. Drive:
- NYJ – Bruce Harper 4-yard pass from Richard Todd (Pat Leahy kick). Steelers 23–20. Drive:

Top passers

- PIT – Terry Bradshaw – 10/28, 143 yards, 2 TD, INT
- NYJ – Matt Robinson – 7/19, 80 yards, TD, 3 INT

Top rushers

- PIT – Franco Harris – 21 rushes, 83 yards, TD
- NYJ – Scott Dierking – 23 rushes, 107 yards

Top receivers

- PIT – Lynn Swann – 4 receptions, 54 yards, TD
- NYJ – Scott Dierking – 3 receptions, 26 yards, TD

==== Week 12 (Sunday December 4, 1977): vs. Seattle Seahawks ====
	1	2	3	4	Total
Seahawks	0	3	10	7	20
Steelers	7	6	0	17	30

at Three Rivers Stadium, Pittsburgh, Pennsylvania

- Game time: 1:00 pm EST
- Game weather: 33 °F (1 °C), wind 7 mph (11 km/h)
- Game attendance: 45,429
- Referee: Cal Lepore
- TV announcers: (NBC) Sam Nover (play by play), Mike Haffner (color commentator)

Scoring drives:

- Pittsburgh – Bradshaw 5 run (Gerela kick)
- Seattle – FG Leypoldt 20
- Pittsburgh – FG Gerela 22
- Pittsburgh – FG Gerela 28
- Seattle – McCullum 65 pass from Zorn (Leypoldt kick)
- Pittsburgh – FG Gerela 43
- Pittsburgh – Swann 22 pass from Bradshaw (Gerela kick)
- Pittsburgh – Bradshaw 3 run (Gerela kick)
- Seattle – Largent 30 pass from Zorn (Leypoldt kick)

==== Week 13 (Saturday December 10, 1977): at Cincinnati Bengals ====
	1	2	3	4	Total
Steelers	0	10	0	0	10
Bengals	7	0	10	0	17

at Riverfront Stadium, Cincinnati

- Game time: 1:00 pm EST
- Game weather: 0 °F (−18 °C), wind 12 mph (19 km/h)
- Game attendance: 36,133
- Referee: Jim Tunney
- TV announcers: (NBC) Curt Gowdy (play by play), John Brodie (color commentator)

Scoring drives:

- Cincinnati – Parrish 47 interception return (Bahr kick)
- Pittsburgh – Harris 5 run (Gerela kick)
- Pittsburgh – FG Gerela 32
- Cincinnati – FG Bahr 24
- Cincinnati – McInally 43 pass from Anderson (Bahr kick)

==== Week 14 (Sunday December 18, 1977): at San Diego Chargers ====
	1	2	3	4	Total
Steelers	0	0	10	0	10
Chargers	6	3	0	0	9

at San Diego Stadium, San Diego, California

- Game time: 4:00 pm EST
- Game weather: 63 °F (17 °C), wind 12 mph (19 km/h)
- Game attendance: 50,727
- Referee: Ben Dreith
- TV announcers: (NBC) Charlie Jones (play by play), Andy Russell (color commentator)

Scoring drives:

- San Diego – C. Williams 2 run (kick failed)
- San Diego – FG Benirschke 38
- Pittsburgh – Thornton 1 run (Gerela kick)
- Pittsburgh – FG Gerela 27

=== Standings ===
AFC Central
	W	L	T	PCT	DIV	CONF	PF	PA	STK
Pittsburgh Steelers^{(3)}	9	5	0	.643	4–2	7–5	276	243	W1
Houston Oilers	8	6	0	.571	3–3	6–6	299	230	W2
Cincinnati Bengals	8	6	0	.571	3–3	6–5	238	235	L1
Cleveland Browns	6	8	0	.429	2–4	5–7	269	267	L4

== Postseason ==
=== Game summary ===
==== AFC Divisional Playoff (Saturday December 24, 1977): at Denver Broncos ====
	1	2	3	4	Total
Steelers	0	14	0	7	21
Broncos	7	7	7	13	34

at Mile High Stadium, Denver, Colorado

- Game time: 4:00 pm EST
- Game weather: 44 °F (7 °C), wind 17 mph (27 km/h)
- Game attendance: 75,059
- Referee: Gene Barth
- TV announcers: (NBC) Jim Simpson (play by play), Merlin Olsen (color commentator)
- Denver – Lytle 7 run (Turner kick)
- Pittsburgh – Bradshaw 1 run (Gerela kick)
- Denver – Armstrong 10 run (Turner kick)
- Pittsburgh – Harris 1 run (Gerela kick)
- Denver – Odoms 30 pass from Morton (Turner kick)
- Pittsburgh – Brown 1 pass from Bradshaw (Gerela kick)
- Denver – FG Turner 44
- Denver – FG Turner 25
- Denver – Dolbin 34 pass from Morton (Turner kick)

== See also ==
- List of NFL teams affected by internal conflict
