= 1976 Pittsburgh Steelers season =

Pittsburgh Steelers 44th US football season

- Owner: Art Rooney
- Head coach: Chuck Noll
- Home stadium: Three Rivers Stadium

Results
- Record: 10–4
- Division place: 1st in AFC Central
- Playoffs: Won Divisional Playoffs (at Colts) 40–14; Lost AFC Championship (at Raiders) 7–24
- All-Pros: 5: Jack Ham (1st team); Jack Lambert (1st team); Glen Edwards (2nd team); Joe Greene (2nd team); Mike Wagner (2nd team)
- Pro Bowlers: 12: CB Mel Blount; QB Terry Bradshaw; S Glen Edwards; DT Joe Greene; DE L. C. Greenwood; LB Jack Ham; RB Franco Harris; LB Jack Lambert; LB Andy Russell; WR Lynn Swann; S Mike Wagner; CB J.T. Thomas
- Team MVP: Jack Lambert

The 1976 Pittsburgh Steelers season was the team's 44th in the National Football League. The team attempted to win their third consecutive Super Bowl championship but ultimately lost to their bitter rivals, the Oakland Raiders 24–7 in the AFC Championship Game. Despite failing to reach the Super Bowl, the 1976 Steelers are fondly remembered as one of the franchise's most dominant teams, thanks to a record-setting defense and running game. The Steelers' strong defense finished the season with just 9.9 points allowed per game, the fewest in the NFL, and a franchise record that still stands.

== Offseason ==
=== 1976 expansion draft ===
Pittsburgh Steelers selected during the expansion draft
| Round | Overall | Name | Position | Expansion team |
|---|---|---|---|---|
| 0 | 0 | Ed Bradley | Linebacker | Seattle Seahawks |
| 0 | 0 | Dave Brown | Cornerback | Seattle Seahawks |
| 0 | 0 | Dave Reavis | Offensive tackle | Tampa Bay Buccaneers |

=== NFL draft ===
1976 Pittsburgh Steelers draft
| Round | Pick | Player | Position | College | Notes |
| 1 | 28 | Bennie Cunningham | Tight end | Clemson | |
| 2 | 37 | Ray Pinney | Guard | Washington | |
| 2 | 47 | Mike Kruczek | Quarterback | Boston College | |
| 2 | 56 | James Files | Center | McNeese State | |
| 3 | 70 | Ron Coder | Defensive tackle | Penn State | |
| 3 | 88 | Ernie Pough | Wide receiver | Texas Southern | |
| 4 | 112 | Wonder Monds | Safety | Nebraska | |
| 4 | 120 | Theo Bell | Wide receiver | Arizona | |
| 5 | 152 | Rodney Norton | Linebacker | Rice | |
| 5 | 159 | Gary Dunn | Defensive tackle | Miami (FL) | 1984 second-team All-Pro |
| 6 | 182 | Jack Deloplaine | Running back | Salem | |
| 7 | 209 | Barry Burton | Tight end | Vanderbilt | |
| 8 | 237 | Ed McAleney | Defensive tackle | UMass | |
| 9 | 265 | Wentford Gaines | Cornerback | Cincinnati | |
| 10 | 291 | Gary Campbell | Linebacker | Colorado | |
| 11 | 319 | Rolland Fuchs | Running back | Arkansas | |
| 12 | 347 | Bill Carroll | Wide receiver | East Texas State | |
| 13 | 375 | Larry Kain | Tight end | Ohio State | |
| 14 | 403 | Wayne Field | Defensive back | Florida | |
| 15 | 431 | Mel Davis | Defensive end | North Texas State | |
| 16 | 459 | Randy Butts | Running back | Kearney State | |
| 17 | 487 | Kelvin Kirk | Wide receiver | Dayton | Mr. Irrelevant |
Made roster

== Season summary ==
The Steelers started the season looking to become the first team in the Super Bowl era to win three-straight league championships (and first since the 1929–1931 and 1965–1967 Green Bay Packers). However, many thought that would be in doubt after the team started 1–4 and saw quarterback Terry Bradshaw injured in the week 5 loss to the Cleveland Browns after a vicious sack by Joe "Turkey" Jones that has since become immortalized in NFL Films as part of the Browns-Steelers rivalry.

Despite the setbacks, behind the strength of the Steel Curtain defense and the dual threat of Franco Harris and Rocky Bleier at running back, the Steelers ended the season on a nine-game winning streak to finish 10-4 and win the AFC Central. Harris rushed for 1,128 yards and 14 touchdowns, while Bleier had the best season of his career with 1,036 rushing yards and five touchdowns. With both running backs rushing for over 1,000 yards, the Steelers became the second team in NFL history to have a 1,000 yard rushing duo (the first being the undefeated 1972 Miami Dolphins, the 1976 Steelers and the 1972 Dolphins are the only teams to accomplish this in a 14-game schedule).

Meanwhile, led by linebacker Jack Lambert, the 1976 Defensive Player of the Year, the Steel Curtain had its most dominant season. The defense posted five shutouts, the most in a single season in the Super Bowl era; all five shutouts came during the team's nine-game winning streak. This included three consecutive shutouts (from Weeks 7-9), a 15-quarter shutout streak, and five consecutive games where the team did not allow a touchdown (Weeks 6-10). During the winning streak, the team did not allow a touchdown in eight games. During Weeks 6-10, the Steelers scored 112 consecutive points. Overall, the defense allowed just 138 points (including only 28 during the winning streak), forced 46 turnovers, and sent eight starting defensive players to the Pro Bowl, including the entire starting secondary.

Rookie quarterback Mike Kruczek wound up going 6–0 starting in place of Bradshaw, largely due to the strength of the ground game and defense. This would also stand as an NFL record for best start for a rookie quarterback until 2004—when the Steelers' own Ben Roethlisberger more than doubled that record and went 13–0 as a starter his rookie season.

However, injuries to both Bleier and Harris in the AFC Divisional Playoff game against the Baltimore Colts sidelined them both for the following week's AFC Championship game against the Oakland Raiders. Without both of their 1,000-yard rushers, the Steelers lost to the Raiders by a score of 24–7. Even with Pittsburgh coming up short, many Steelers fans—including the Rooney family themselves—consider the 1976 Steelers the best team in franchise history, even better than all six world championship teams. Jack Lambert, who won 4 Super Bowls with the Steelers between 1974 and 1979, claimed that the 1976 Steelers team was the best team that he ever played for, and subsequently, the loss to the Raiders in the AFC Championship game was the most painful loss of his career. Lambert is convinced that they would have beaten the Raiders and gone on to win that season's Super Bowl had Harris and Bleier both been healthy and available for said AFC Championship game. Despite their opinions, the 1976 Steelers were not on the 100 greatest teams of all time presented by the NFL on its 100th anniversary.

In 2007, ESPN.com named the 1976 Steelers the greatest defense in NFL history, noting, "the 1976 unit was the best (slightly better than the '75 squad). Here's why: 28. That's how many points the Steel Curtain surrendered in the last nine games of the season. That's a total. As a result, Pittsburgh, which started the season 1–4, made it all the way to the AFC Championship Game. Only one of the seven teams the Steelers played during the streak finished the season with a winning record (Cincinnati) and none made the playoffs. However the defensive dominance did extend to the Divisional playoff with a resounding 40–14 defeat of the AFC East Champion Baltimore Colts. The Steelers' defense had Hall of Famers Mean Joe Greene, Jack Lambert, Jack Ham and Mel Blount. And eight Steelers defensive players made the 1976 Pro Bowl team: cornerback J.T. Thomas, defensive end L. C. Greenwood, Greene, Ham, Lambert, defensive back Glen Edwards, safety Mike Wagner, and Blount."

== Personnel ==
=== Staff / Coaches ===
1976 Pittsburgh Steelers staff
| Front office: Chairman of the board — Arthur J. Rooney; President — Daniel M. Rooney; Vice president — John R. McGinley; Vice president — Arthur J. Rooney, Jr.; Public relations director — Ed Kiely; Traveling secretary — James A. Boston; Publicity director — Joe Gordon; Controller — Dennis P. Thimons; Ticket manager — Joseph H. Carr; Director of player personnel — Dick Haley; Assistant director of player personnel — Bill Nunn; Director of professional scouting — V. Timothy Rooney; Head coaches: Head coach — Chuck Noll; Offensive coaches: Offensive backfield — Dick Hoak; Offensive line — Dan Radakovich; Offensive assistant — John Spezzaferro; Receivers — Lionel Taylor | Defensive coaches: Defensive coordinator — Bud Carson; Defensive line — George Perles; Linebackers — Woody Widenhofer; Strength and conditioning: Strength — Louis Riecke; Flexibility — Paul Uram; Team Physician, M.D. — Dr. David S. Huber; Team physician, orthopedic — Dr. Paul B. Steele, Jr.; Team dentist — Dr. George P. Boucek; Trainer — Ralph Berlin; Assistant trainer — Robert Milie; Equipment manager — Anthony Parisi; Field manager — Jack Hart; Film director — Bob McCartney; Photographer — Harry Homa |

=== Roster ===
1976 Pittsburgh Steelers roster
| Quarterbacks (QB): 12 Terry Bradshaw; 16 Neil Graff; 15 Mike Kruczek; Running backs (RB): 20 Rocky Bleier; 35 Jack Deloplaine; 33 John Fuqua; 32 Franco Harris; 46 Reggie Harrison; Wide receivers (WR): 83 Theo Bell; 43 Frank Lewis; 22 Ernie Pough; 82 John Stallworth; 88 Lynn Swann; Tight ends (TE): 87 Larry Brown; 89 Bennie Cunningham; 84 Randy Grossman | Offensive linemen (OL): 50 Jim Clack G; 57 Sam Davis G; 55 Jon Kolb T; 56 Ray Mansfield C; 72 Gerry Mullins T; 74 Ray Pinney T; 52 Mike Webster C/G; Defensive linemen (DL): 76 John Banaszak DE; 64 Steve Furness DE; 75 Joe Greene DT; 68 L. C. Greenwood DE; 63 Ernie Holmes DT; 78 Dwight White DE | Linebackers (LB): 53 Greg Blankenship OLB; 59 Jack Ham OLB; 54 Marv Kellum MLB; 58 Jack Lambert MLB; 34 Andy Russell OLB; 51 Loren Toews OLB; Defensive backs (DB): 45 Jimmy Allen CB; 47 Mel Blount CB; 27 Glen Edwards FS; 31 Donnie Shell SS; 24 J. T. Thomas CB; 23 Mike Wagner SS; Special teams (ST): 10 Roy Gerela K; 39 Bobby Walden P | Reserve: 44 Mike Collier RB (IR); 67 Gary Dunn DT (IR); 73 Jim Files G (IR); 36 Wentford Gaines CB (IR); 86 Reggie Garrett WR (IR); 71 Gordon Gravelle T (IR); 11 Allen Hooker S (IR); 29 Brent Sexton CB (IR); Rookies in italics 43 active, 8 reserve |

== Regular season ==
=== Schedule ===
| Week | Date | Opponent | Result | Record | Venue |
|---|---|---|---|---|---|
| 1 | September 12 | at Oakland Raiders | **L** 28–31 | 0–1 | Oakland–Alameda County Coliseum |
| 2 | September 19 | **Cleveland Browns** | **W** 31–14 | 1–1 | Three Rivers Stadium |
| 3 | September 26 | New England Patriots | **L** 27–30 | 1–2 | Three Rivers Stadium |
| 4 | October 4 | at Minnesota Vikings | **L** 6–17 | 1–3 | Metropolitan Stadium |
| 5 | October 10 | at **Cleveland Browns** | **L** 16–18 | 1–4 | Cleveland Stadium |
| 6 | October 17 | **Cincinnati Bengals** | **W** 23–6 | 2–4 | Three Rivers Stadium |
| 7 | October 24 | at New York Giants | **W** 27–0 | 3–4 | Giants Stadium |
| 8 | October 31 | San Diego Chargers | **W** 23–0 | 4–4 | Three Rivers Stadium |
| 9 | November 7 | at Kansas City Chiefs | **W** 45–0 | 5–4 | Arrowhead Stadium |
| 10 | November 14 | Miami Dolphins | **W** 14–3 | 6–4 | Three Rivers Stadium |
| 11 | November 21 | **Houston Oilers** | **W** 32–16 | 7–4 | Three Rivers Stadium |
| 12 | November 28 | at **Cincinnati Bengals** | **W** 7–3 | 8–4 | Riverfront Stadium |
| 13 | December 5 | Tampa Bay Buccaneers | **W** 42–0 | 9–4 | Three Rivers Stadium |
| 14 | December 11 | at **Houston Oilers** | **W** 21–0 | 10–4 | Houston Astrodome |
Note: Intra-division opponents are in **bold** text.

=== Game summaries ===
==== Week 1: at Oakland Raiders ====
Week One: Pittsburgh Steelers (0–0) at Oakland Raiders (0–0)

| Quarter | 1 | 2 | 3 | 4 | Total |
|---|---|---|---|---|---|
| Steelers | 0 | 7 | 7 | 14 | **28** |
| **Raiders** | 7 | 0 | 0 | 24 | **31** |

at Oakland–Alameda County Coliseum, Oakland, California

- Date: September 12, 1976
- Game time: 4:00 pm EDT
- Game weather: 62 °F or 16.7 °C, wind 8 miles per hour (13 km/h; 7.0 kn)
- Game attendance: 51,371
- Referee: Jim Tunney
- TV announcers (NBC): Curt Gowdy & Don Meredith

Game information
**First quarter**
- No Scoring Plays

**Second quarter**

- OAK — Casper 30-yard pass from Stabler (Steinfort kick). Raiders 7–0
- PIT — Bleier 2-yard-yard run (Gerela kick). 7–7

**Third quarter**

- PIT — Stallworth 47-yard lateral from Harris after 25-yard run (Gerela kick). Steelers 14–7

**Fourth quarter**

- PIT — Bell 11-yard pass from Bradshaw (Gerela kick). Steelers 21–7
- OAK — Biletnikoff 21-yard pass from Stabler (Steinfort kick). Steelers 21–14
- PIT — Harris 3-yard-yard run (Gerela kick). Steelers 28–14
- OAK — Casper 10-yard pass from Stabler (Steinfort kick). Steelers 28–21
- OAK — Stabler 2-yard-yard run (Steinfort kick). 28–28
- OAK — Steinfort 21-yard field goal. Raiders 31–28

**Additional Notes**

- The game was cited by the Sacramento Bee as one of the "great games of the past" and was described as a shootout.

==== Week 2: vs. Cleveland Browns ====
Week Two: Cleveland Browns (1–0) at Pittsburgh Steelers (0–1)

| Quarter | 1 | 2 | 3 | 4 | Total |
|---|---|---|---|---|---|
| Browns | 0 | 14 | 0 | 0 | **14** |
| **Steelers** | 0 | 0 | 17 | 14 | **31** |

at Three Rivers Stadium, Pittsburgh, Pennsylvania

- Date: Sunday, September 19, 1976
- Game time: 1:00 pm EDT
- Game weather: 63 °F or 17.2 °C, wind 9 miles per hour (14 km/h; 7.8 kn)
- Game attendance: 49,169
- Referee: Tommy Bell
- TV announcers (NBC): Jack Buck & Paul Maguire

Game information
**First quarter**
- No scoring plays

**Second quarter**

- CLE — Rucker 14-yard pass from Sipe (Cockroft kick). Browns 7–0
- CLE — Roan 17-yard pass from Sipe (Cockroft kick). Browns 14–0

**Third quarter**

- PIT — Stallworth 14-yard pass from Bradshaw (Gerela kick). Browns 14–7
- PIT — Gerela 47-yard field goal. Browns 14–10
- PIT — Harris 2-yard run (Gerela kick). Steelers 17–14
- PIT — Stallworth 5-yard pass from Bradshaw (Gerela kick). Steelers 24–14
- PIT — Bradshaw 7-yard run (Gerela kick). Steelers 31–14

==== Week 3: vs. New England Patriots ====
Week Three: New England Patriots (1–1) at Pittsburgh Steelers (1–1)

| Quarter | 1 | 2 | 3 | 4 | Total |
|---|---|---|---|---|---|
| **Patriots** | 6 | 3 | 14 | 7 | **30** |
| Steelers | 7 | 6 | 7 | 7 | **27** |

at Three Rivers Stadium, Pittsburgh, Pennsylvania

- Date: Sunday, September 26, 1976
- Game time: 1:00 pm EDT
- Game weather: 56 °F or 13.3 °C, wind 8 miles per hour (13 km/h; 7.0 kn)
- Game attendance: 47,379
- Referee: Dick Jorgensen
- TV: NBC

Game information
**First quarter**
- PIT — Harris 3-yard run (Gerela kick). Steelers 7–0
- NWE — Smith 42-yard field goal. Steelers 7–3
- NWE — Smith 40-yard field goal. Steelers 7–6

**Second quarter**

- PIT — Gerela 32-yard field goal. Steelers 10–6
- NWE — Smith 26-yard field goal. Steelers 10–9
- PIT — Gerela 41-yard field goal. Steelers 13–9

**Third quarter**

- PIT — Harris 2-yard run (Gerela kick). Steelers 20–9
- NWE — Francis 38-yard pass from Grogan (Smith kick). Steelers 20–16
- NWE — Stingley 58-yard pass from Grogan (Smith kick). Patriots 23–20

**Fourth quarter**

- NWE — Grogan 6-yard run (Smith kick). Patriots 30–20
- PIT — Grossman 11-yard pass from Bradshaw (Gerela kick). Patriots 30–27

==== Week 4: at Minnesota Vikings ====
Week Four: Pittsburgh Steelers (1–2) at Minnesota Vikings (2–0–1)

| Quarter | 1 | 2 | 3 | 4 | Total |
|---|---|---|---|---|---|
| Steelers | 6 | 0 | 0 | 0 | **6** |
| **Vikings** | 0 | 7 | 0 | 10 | **17** |

at Metropolitan Stadium, Bloomington, Minnesota

- Date: Monday, October 4, 1976
- Game time: 9:00 pm EDT
- Game weather: 65 °F or 18.3 °C, wind 13 miles per hour (21 km/h; 11 kn)
- Game attendance: 47,809
- Referee: Pat Haggerty
- TV announcers (ABC): Frank Gifford (play by play)
  Alex Karras and Howard Cosell (color commentators)

Game information
**First quarter**
- PIT — Cunningham 1-yard pass from Bradshaw (kick blocked). Steelers 6–0

**Second quarter**

- MIN — Foreman 8-yard run (Cox kick). Vikings 7–6

**Fourth quarter**

- MIN — Foreman 4-yard run (Cox kick). Vikings 14–6
- MIN — Cox 43-yard field goal. Vikings 17–6

==== Week 5: at Cleveland Browns ====
Week Five: Pittsburgh Steelers (1–3) at Cleveland Browns (1–3)

| Quarter | 1 | 2 | 3 | 4 | Total |
|---|---|---|---|---|---|
| Steelers | 7 | 3 | 0 | 6 | **16** |
| **Browns** | 3 | 3 | 9 | 3 | **18** |

at Cleveland Municipal Stadium, Cleveland, Ohio

- Date: Sunday, October 10, 1976
- Game time: 1:00 p.m. EST
- Game weather: 48 °F or 8.9 °C, wind 13 miles per hour (21 km/h; 11 kn)
- Game attendance: 76,411
- Referee: Bernie Ulman
- TV: NBC
- Pro-Football-Reference.com

Game information

**First quarter**

- CLE — Don Cockroft 43-yard field goal. Browns 3–0
- PIT — Franco Harris 1-yard-yard run (Roy Gerela kick). Steelers 7–3

**Second quarter**

- CLE — Don Cockroft 28-yard field goal .Steelers 7–6
- PIT — Roy Gerela 30-yard field goal. Steelers 10–6

**Third quarter**

- CLE — Cleo Miller 1-yard-yard run (kick failed) .Browns 12–10
- CLE — Don Cockroft 50-yard field goal. Browns 15–10

**Fourth quarter**

- CLE — Don Cockroft 40-yard field goal. Browns 18–10
- PIT — Mike Kruczek 22-yard-yard run (kick blocked). Browns 18–16

Top-yard passers

- PIT — Terry Bradshaw — 10/18, 75 yards, INT
- CLE — Brian Sipe — 4/14, 80 yards

Top rushers

- PIT — Franco Harris — 13 rushes, 39 yards, TD
- CLE — Greg Pruitt — 22 rushes, 76 yards

Top receivers

- PIT — Lynn Swann — 3 receptions, 74 yards
- CLE — Reggie Rucker — 3 receptions, 77 yards

Terry Bradshaw was injured on a sack by Turkey Jones and missed six weeks.

==== Week 6: vs. Cincinnati Bengals ====
Week Six: Cincinnati Bengals (4–1) at Pittsburgh Steelers (1–4)

| Quarter | 1 | 2 | 3 | 4 | Total |
|---|---|---|---|---|---|
| Bengals | 3 | 0 | 3 | 0 | **6** |
| **Steelers** | 0 | 13 | 0 | 10 | **23** |

at Three Rivers Stadium, Pittsburgh, Pennsylvania

- Date: Sunday, October 17, 1976
- Game time: 1:00 pm EDT
- Game weather: 41 °F or 5 °C, wind 9 miles per hour (14 km/h; 7.8 kn)
- Game attendance: 48,311
- Referee: Cal Lepore
- TV announcers (NBC): Curt Gowdy and John Brodie

Game information
**First quarter**
- CIN — Bahr 22-yard field goal. 0–3

**Second quarter**

- PIT — Gerela 42-yard field goal. 3–3
- PIT — Harris 1-yard run (Gerela kick). 10–3
- PIT — Gerela 40-yard field goal. 13–3

**Third quarter**

- CIN — Bahr 19-yard field goal. 13–6

**Fourth quarter**

- PIT — Harris 1-yard run (Gerela kick). 20–6
- PIT — Gerela 30-yard field goal. 23–6

==== Week 7: at New York Giants ====
Week Seven: Pittsburgh Steelers (2–4) at New York Giants (0–6)

| Quarter | 1 | 2 | 3 | 4 | Total |
|---|---|---|---|---|---|
| **Steelers** | 0 | 10 | 0 | 17 | **27** |
| Giants | 0 | 0 | 0 | 0 | **0** |

at Giants Stadium, East Rutherford, New Jersey

- Date: Sunday, October 24, 1976
- Game time: 1:00 pm EDT
- Game weather: 51 °F or 10.6 °C, wind 10 miles per hour (16 km/h; 8.7 kn)
- Game attendance: 69,783
- Referee: Gordon McCarter
- TV: NBC

Game information
**First quarter**
- No scoring plays

**Second quarter**

- PIT — Harris 1-yard run (Gerela kick). Steelers 7–0
- PIT — Gerela 21-yard field goal. Steelers 10–0

**Third quarter**

- No scoring plays

**Fourth quarter**

- PIT — Harris 1-yard run (Gerela kick). Steelers 17–0
- PIT — Gerela 28-yard field goal. Steelers 20–0
- PIT — Lewis 16-yard run (Gerela kick). Steelers 27–0

This was the first of five shoutout victories, and the second of a sequence of nine games conceding just two touchdowns.

==== Week 8: vs. San Diego Chargers ====
Week Eight: San Diego Chargers (4–3) at Pittsburgh Steelers (3–4)

| Quarter | 1 | 2 | 3 | 4 | Total |
|---|---|---|---|---|---|
| Chargers | 0 | 0 | 0 | 0 | **0** |
| **Steelers** | 0 | 3 | 0 | 20 | **23** |

at Three Rivers Stadium, Pittsburgh, Pennsylvania

- Date: Sunday, October 31, 1976
- Game time: 1:00 pm EST
- Game weather: 44 °F or 6.7 °C, wind 14 miles per hour (23 km/h; 12 kn)
- Game attendance: 45,484
- Referee: Tommy Bell
- TV announcers (NBC): Jim Simpson and Len Dawson

Game information
**First quarter**
- No scoring plays

**Second quarter**

- PIT — Gerela 36-yard field goal. Steelers 3–0

**Third quarter**

- No scoring plays

**Fourth quarter**

- PIT — Bradshaw 1-yard run (Gerela kick). Steelers 10–0
- PIT — Pough 11-yard pass from Bradshaw (Gerela kick). Steelers 17–0
- PIT — Fuqua 3-yard run (kick failed). Steelers 23–0

==== Week 9: at Kansas City Chiefs ====
Week Nine: Pittsburgh Steelers (4–4) at Kansas City Chiefs (3–5)

| Quarter | 1 | 2 | 3 | 4 | Total |
|---|---|---|---|---|---|
| **Steelers** | 7 | 3 | 21 | 14 | **45** |
| Chiefs | 0 | 0 | 0 | 0 | **0** |

at Arrowhead Stadium, Kansas City, Missouri

- Date: Sunday, November 7, 1976
- Game time: 2:00 pm EST
- Game weather: 41 °F or 5 °C, wind 14 miles per hour (23 km/h; 12 kn)
- Game attendance: 71,516
- Referee: Fred Silva
- TV announcers (NBC): Ross Porter and Lionel Aldridge

Game information
**First quarter**
- PIT — Harrison 4-yard run (Gerela kick). Steelers 7–0

**Second quarter**

- PIT — Gerela 28-yard field goal. Steelers 10–0

**Third quarter**

- PIT — Harris 25-yard run (Gerela kick). Steelers 17–0
- PIT — Harris 5-yard run (Gerela kick). Steelers 24–0
- PIT — Lewis 19-yard pass from Bradshaw (Gerela kick). Steelers 31–0

**Fourth quarter**

- PIT — Deloplaine 15-yard run (Gerela kick). Steelers 38–0
- PIT — Deloplaine 7-yard run (Gerela kick). Steelers 45–0

==== Week 10: vs. Miami Dolphins ====
Week Ten: Miami Dolphins (5–4) at Pittsburgh Steelers (5–4)

| Quarter | 1 | 2 | 3 | 4 | Total |
|---|---|---|---|---|---|
| Dolphins | 0 | 0 | 3 | 0 | **3** |
| **Steelers** | 0 | 7 | 0 | 7 | **14** |

at Three Rivers Stadium, Pittsburgh, Pennsylvania

- Date: Sunday, November 14, 1976
- Game time: 4:00 pm EST
- Game weather: 29 °F or −1.7 °C, wind 10 miles per hour (16 km/h; 8.7 kn)
- Game attendance: 48,945
- Referee: Bob Frederic
- TV announcers (NBC): Curt Gowdy and Don Meredith

Game information
First quarter
- No scoring plays

**Second quarter**

- PIT — Harris 21-yard run (Gerela kick). Steelers 7–0

**Third quarter**

- MIA — Yepremian 45-yard field goal. Steelers 7–3

**Fourth quarter**

- PIT — Harrison 1-yard run (Gerela kick). Steelers 14–3

==== Week 11: vs. Houston Oilers ====
Week Eleven: Houston Oilers (4–6) at Pittsburgh Steelers (6–4)

| Quarter | 1 | 2 | 3 | 4 | Total |
|---|---|---|---|---|---|
| Oilers | 0 | 10 | 0 | 6 | **16** |
| **Steelers** | 10 | 5 | 10 | 7 | **32** |

at Three Rivers Stadium, Pittsburgh, Pennsylvania

- Date: Sunday, November 21, 1976
- Game time: 1:00 pm EST
- Game weather: 32 °F or 0 °C, wind 11 miles per hour (18 km/h; 9.6 kn)
- Game attendance: 47,947
- Referee: Ben Dreith
- TV announcers (NBC): Curt Gowdy and John Brodie

Game information
**First quarter**
- PIT — Bleier 10-yard run (Gerela kick). Steelers 7–0
- PIT — Gerela 37-yard field goal. Steelers 10–0

**Second quarter**

- PIT — Safety, Toews blocked punt out of end zone. Steelers 12–0
- HOU — Burrough 69-yard pass from Hadl (Butler kick). Steelers 12–7
- PIT — Gerela 35-yard field goal. Steelers 15–7
- HOU — Butler 43-yard field goal. Steelers 15–10

**Third quarter**

- PIT — Harrison 1-yard run (Gerela kick). Steelers 22–10
- PIT — Gerela 18-yard field goal. Steelers 25–10

**Fourth quarter**

- PIT — Harrison 1-yard run (Gerela kick). Steelers 32–10
- HOU — Sawyer 2-yard pass from Hadl (kick failed). Steelers 32–16

==== Week 12: at Cincinnati Bengals ====
Week Twelve: Pittsburgh Steelers (7–4) at Cincinnati Bengals (9–2)

| Quarter | 1 | 2 | 3 | 4 | Total |
|---|---|---|---|---|---|
| **Steelers** | 0 | 0 | 7 | 0 | **7** |
| Bengals | 3 | 0 | 0 | 0 | **3** |

at Riverfront Stadium, Cincinnati

- Date: Sunday, November 28, 1976
- Game time: 4:00 pm EST
- Game weather: 32 °F or 0 °C, wind 12 miles per hour (19 km/h; 10 kn)
- Game attendance: 55,142
- Referee: Jim Tunney
- TV announcers (NBC): Curt Gowdy and Don Meredith

Game information
**First quarter**
- CIN — Bahr 40-yard field goal. Bengals 3–0

**Second quarter**

- No scoring plays

**Third quarter**

- PIT — Harris 4-yard run (Gerela kick). Steelers 7–3

**Fourth quarter**

- No scoring plays

==== Week 13: vs. Tampa Bay Buccaneers ====
Week Thirteen: Tampa Bay Buccaneers at Pittsburgh Steelers

| Quarter | 1 | 2 | 3 | 4 | Total |
|---|---|---|---|---|---|
| Buccaneers | 0 | 0 | 0 | 0 | **0** |
| **Steelers** | 7 | 21 | 14 | 0 | **42** |

at Three Rivers Stadium, Pittsburgh, Pennsylvania

- Date: Sunday, December 5, 1976
- Game time: 1:00 p.m. EST
- Game weather: 23 °F or −5 °C, wind 5 miles per hour (8.0 km/h; 4.3 kn)
- Game attendance: 43,385
- Referee: Cal Lepore
- TV: NBC
- Box score

Game information

**First quarter**

- PIT – Rocky Bleier 7-yard run (Roy Gerela kick). Steelers 7–0

**Second quarter**

- PIT – Rocky Bleier 1-yard run (Roy Gerela kick). Steelers 14–0
- PIT – Mike Kruczek 1-yard run (Roy Gerela kick). Steelers 21–0
- PIT – Rocky Bleier 3-yard run (Roy Gerela kick). Steelers 28–0

**Third quarter**

- PIT – Lynn Swann 35-yard pass from Terry Bradshaw (Roy Gerela kick). Steelers 35–0
- PIT – Lynn Swann 23-yard pass from Terry Bradshaw (Roy Gerela kick). Steelers 42–0

**Fourth quarter**

- No scoring plays

Top passers

- PIT – Mike Kruczek – 6/7, 84 yards
- TAM – Steve Spurrier – 4/10, 58 yards, INT

Top rushers

- PIT – Rocky Bleier – 29 rushes, 118 yards, 3 TD
- TAM – Jimmy DuBose – 5 rushes, 32 yards

Top receivers

- PIT – Lynn Swann – 5 receptions, 92 yards, 2 TD
- TAM – Jack Novak – 2 receptions, 30 yards

==== Week 14: at Houston Oilers ====
Week Fourteen: Pittsburgh Steelers (9–4) at Houston Oilers (5–8)

| Quarter | 1 | 2 | 3 | 4 | Total |
|---|---|---|---|---|---|
| **Steelers** | 0 | 7 | 7 | 7 | **21** |
| Oilers | 0 | 0 | 0 | 0 | **0** |

at Astrodome, Houston, Texas

- Date: Saturday, December 11, 1976
- Game time: 4:00 pm EST
- Game weather: Played indoors (domed stadium)
- Game attendance: 44,743
- Referee: Fred Silva
- TV announcers (NBC): Curt Gowdy and John Brodie

Game information
**First quarter**
- No scoring plays

**Second quarter**

- PIT — Swann 21-yard pass from Bradshaw (Gerela kick). Steelers 7–0

**Third quarter**

- PIT — Harris 11-yard run (Gerela kick). Steelers 14–0

**Fourth quarter**

- PIT — Bradshaw 1-yard run (Gerela kick). Steelers 21–0

With this win the Steelers record the most NFL shutouts in a season in 50 years with their fifth and set a new NFL record forcing 71 punts in a season.

=== Standings ===
AFC Central
| | W | L | T | PCT | DIV | CONF | PF | PA | STK |
|---|---|---|---|---|---|---|---|---|---|
| Pittsburgh Steelers^{(3)} | 10 | 4 | 0 | .714 | 5–1 | 9–3 | 342 | 138 | W9 |
| Cincinnati Bengals | 10 | 4 | 0 | .714 | 4–2 | 8–4 | 335 | 210 | W1 |
| Cleveland Browns | 9 | 5 | 0 | .643 | 3–3 | 7–5 | 267 | 287 | L1 |
| Houston Oilers | 5 | 9 | 0 | .357 | 0–6 | 3–9 | 222 | 273 | L2 |

== Postseason ==
=== Schedule ===
| Round | Date | Opponent (seed) | Result | Record | Venue | Attendance |
|---|---|---|---|---|---|---|
| Divisional | December 19 | at Baltimore Colts (2) | W 40–14 | 1–0 | Memorial Stadium | 59,296 |
| AFC Championship | December 26 | at Oakland Raiders (1) | L 7–24 | 1–1 | Oakland–Alameda County Coliseum | 53,821 |

==== Game summaries ====
===== AFC Divisional Playoffs: at (2) Baltimore Colts =====
AFC Divisional Playoffs: (3) Pittsburgh Steelers at (2) Baltimore Colts

| Quarter | 1 | 2 | 3 | 4 | Total |
|---|---|---|---|---|---|
| Steelers | 9 | 17 | 0 | 14 | 40 |
| Colts | 7 | 0 | 0 | 7 | 14 |

at Memorial Stadium, Baltimore, Maryland

- Date: December 19
- Game time: 2:00 p.m. EST
- Game weather: 36 °F (2 °C), wind 6 MPH
- Game attendance: 59,296
- Referee: Pat Haggerty
- TV announcers (NBC): Jim Simpson & John Brodie
- Box score

Game information

First quarter

- PIT – Frank Lewis 76-yard pass from Terry Bradshaw (kick failed). Steelers 6–0.
- PIT – Roy Gerela 45-yard field goal. Steelers 9–0.
- BAL – Roger Carr 17-yard pass from Bert Jones (Toni Linhart kick). Steelers 9–7.

Second quarter

- PIT – Reggie Harrison 1-yard run (Roy Gerela kick). Steelers 16–7.
- PIT – Lynn Swann 29-yard pass from Terry Bradshaw (Roy Gerela kick). Steelers 23–7.
- PIT – Roy Gerela 25-yard field goal. Steelers 26–7.

Third quarter

- No scoring plays

Fourth quarter

- PIT – Lynn Swann 11-yard pass from Terry Bradshaw (Roy Gerela kick). Steelers 33–7.
- BAL – Roosevelt Leaks 1-yard run (Toni Linhart kick). Steelers 33–14.
- PIT – Reggie Harrison 10-yard run (Ray Mansfield kick). Steelers 40–14.

Top passers

- PIT – Terry Bradshaw – 14/18, 264 yards, 3 TD
- BAL – Bert Jones – 11/25, 144 yards, TD, 2 INT

Top rushers

- PIT – Franco Harris – 18 rushes, 132 yards
- BAL – Lydell Mitchell – 16 rushes, 55 yards

Top receivers

- PIT – Frank Lewis – 2 receptions, 103 yards, TD
- BAL – Raymond Chester – 3 receptions, 42 yards

Pittsburgh gained a then-NFL record 524 total yards, but Franco Harris and Rocky Bleier were lost to injuries.

===== AFC Championship: at (1) Oakland Raiders =====
AFC Championship: (3) Pittsburgh Steelers at (1) Oakland Raiders

| Quarter | 1 | 2 | 3 | 4 | Total |
|---|---|---|---|---|---|
| Steelers | 0 | 7 | 0 | 0 | 7 |
| Raiders | 3 | 14 | 7 | 0 | 24 |

at Oakland–Alameda County Coliseum, Oakland, California

- Date: December 26
- Game time: 4:00 p.m. EST / 1:00 p.m. PST
- Game weather: 47 °F (8 °C), wind 7 MPH
- Game attendance: 53,821
- Referee: Tommy Bell
- TV announcers (NBC): Curt Gowdy & Don Meredith
- Box score

Game information

First quarter

- OAK – Errol Mann 39-yard field goal. Raiders 3–0.

Second quarter

- OAK – Clarence Davis 1-yard run (Errol Mann kick). Raiders 10–0.
- PIT – Reggie Harrison 3-yard run (Ray Mansfield kick). Raiders 10–7.
- OAK – Warren Bankston 4-yard pass from Ken Stabler (Errol Mann kick). Raiders 17–7.

Third quarter

- OAK – Pete Banaszak 5-yard pass from Ken Stabler (Errol Mann kick). Raiders 24–7.

Fourth quarter

- No scoring plays

Top passers

- PIT – Terry Bradshaw – 14/35, 176 yards, INT
- OAK – Ken Stabler – 10/16, 88 yards, 2 TD

Top rushers

- PIT – Reggie Harrison – 11 rushes, 44 yards, TD
- OAK – Mark van Eeghen – 22 rushes, 66 yards

Top receivers

- PIT – Lynn Swann – 3 receptions, 58 yards
- OAK – Cliff Branch – 3 receptions, 46 yards
