= 1976–77 NFL playoffs =

American football tournament

- Dates: December 18, 1976–January 9, 1977
- Season: 1976
- Teams: 8
- Games played: 7
- Super Bowl XI site: Rose Bowl; Pasadena, California
- Defending champions: Pittsburgh Steelers
- Champion: Oakland Raiders (1st title)
- Runner-up: Minnesota Vikings
- Conference runners-up: Los Angeles Rams; Pittsburgh Steelers
NFL playoffs
← 1975–76	1977–78 →

The National Football League playoffs for the 1976 season began on December 18, 1976. The postseason tournament concluded with the Oakland Raiders defeating the Minnesota Vikings in Super Bowl XI, 32–14, on January 9, 1977, at the Rose Bowl in Pasadena, California.

== Participants ==
Within each conference, the three division winners and the non-division winner with the best record qualified for the playoffs. The three division winners were seeded 1–3 based on their overall won-lost-tied record, and the wild card team was seeded 4. The first round, dubbed the divisional playoffs, had a restriction where two teams from the same division could not meet: the surviving wild card team visited the highest-seeded division champion that was outside its own division, and the remaining two teams from that conference played each other. The two surviving teams from each conference's divisional playoff games met in the respective AFC and NFC Conference Championship games, hosted by the higher seed. Although the Super Bowl, the championship round of the playoffs, was played at a neutral site, the designated home team was based on an annual rotation by conference.

Playoff seeds
Seed	AFC	NFC
1	Oakland Raiders (West winner)	Minnesota Vikings (Central winner)
2	Baltimore Colts (East winner)	Dallas Cowboys (East winner)
3	Pittsburgh Steelers (Central winner)	Los Angeles Rams (West winner)
4	New England Patriots (wild card)	Washington Redskins (wild card)

== Bracket ==
Dec 19 – Memorial Stadium
3	Pittsburgh	40
Dec 26 – Oakland Coliseum
2	Baltimore	14
AFC
3	Pittsburgh	7
Dec 18 – Oakland Coliseum
1	Oakland	24
AFC Championship
4	New England	21
Jan 9 – Rose Bowl
1	Oakland	24
Divisional playoffs
A1	Oakland	32
Dec 19 – Texas Stadium
N1	Minnesota	14
Super Bowl XI
3	Los Angeles	14
Dec 26 – Metropolitan Stadium
2	Dallas	12
NFC
3	Los Angeles	13
Dec 18 – Metropolitan Stadium
1	Minnesota	24
NFC Championship
4	Washington	20
1	Minnesota	35

== Schedule ==
Christmas fell on a Saturday in 1976. In order to avoid scheduling playoff games on the holiday, the regular season opened a week earlier than normal (September 12, the second Sunday of the month, rather than the customary third Sunday) so that the Divisional Playoffs could be held on December 18 and 19 instead of December 25 and 26, and thus no games would be needed on Christmas Day. The conference championship games were played Sunday, December 26, and Super Bowl XI was played on January 9, the earliest date in Super Bowl history.

Due to the at-the-time Maryland state law that prohibited Baltimore Colts home games from starting earlier than 2:00 p.m. EST on Sundays, the two divisional playoff games on Sunday, December 19 were pushed to 2:00 p.m. and 5:30 p.m. EST.

In the United States, CBS televised the NFC playoff games, while NBC broadcast the AFC games and Super Bowl XI.

Round	Away team	Score	Home team	Date	Kickoff (ET / UTC−5)	TV
Divisional round	Washington Redskins	20–35	Minnesota Vikings	December 18, 1976	1:00 p.m.	CBS
Divisional round	New England Patriots	21–24	Oakland Raiders	December 18, 1976	4:00 p.m.	NBC
Divisional round	Pittsburgh Steelers	40–14	Baltimore Colts	December 19, 1976	2:00 p.m.	NBC
Divisional round	Los Angeles Rams	14–12	Dallas Cowboys	December 19, 1976	5:30 p.m.	CBS
Conference championships	Los Angeles Rams	13–24	Minnesota Vikings	December 26, 1976	1:00 p.m.	CBS
Conference championships	Pittsburgh Steelers	7–24	Oakland Raiders	December 26, 1976	4:00 p.m.	NBC
Super Bowl XI Rose Bowl Pasadena, California	Oakland Raiders	32–14	Minnesota Vikings	January 9, 1977	3:50 p.m.	NBC

== Divisional round ==
=== Saturday, December 18, 1976 ===
==== NFC: Minnesota Vikings 35, Washington Redskins 20 ====
Washington Redskins vs. Minnesota Vikings – Game summary

Quarter	1	2	3	4	Total
Redskins	3	0	3	14	20
Vikings	14	7	14	0	35

at Metropolitan Stadium, Bloomington, Minnesota

- Game time: 1:00 p.m. EST
- Game attendance: 47,466
- Referee: Bob Frederic
- TV announcers (CBS): Vin Scully and Paul Hornung
- Boxscore

Game information

First quarter

- MIN – Stu Voigt 18-yard pass from Fran Tarkenton (Fred Cox kick). Vikings 7–0.
- WAS – Mark Moseley 47-yard field goal. Vikings 7–3.
- MIN – Sammy White 27-yard pass from Fran Tarkenton (Fred Cox kick). Vikings 14–3.

Second quarter

- MIN – Chuck Foreman 2-yard run (Fred Cox kick). Vikings 21–3.

Third quarter

- MIN – Chuck Foreman 30-yard run (Fred Cox kick). Vikings 28–3.
- WAS – Mark Moseley 35-yard field goal. Vikings 28–6.
- MIN – Sammy White 9-yard pass from Fran Tarkenton (Fred Cox kick). Vikings 35–6.

Fourth quarter

- WAS – Frank Grant 12-yard pass from Billy Kilmer (Mark Moseley kick). Vikings 35–13.
- WAS – Roy Jefferson 3-yard pass from Billy Kilmer (Mark Moseley kick). Vikings 35–20.

Top passers

- WAS – Billy Kilmer – 26/49, 298 yards, 2 TD, 2 INT
- MIN – Fran Tarkenton – 12/21, 170 yards, 3 TD, 2 INT

Top rushers

- WAS – Mike Thomas – 11 rushes, 45 yards
- MIN – Chuck Foreman – 20 rushes, 105 yards, 2 TD

Top receivers

- WAS – Frank Grant – 6 receptions, 70 yards, TD
- MIN – Sammy White – 4 receptions, 64 yards, 2 TD

The Vikings jumped to a 35–6 lead by the end of the third quarter, led by running backs Chuck Foreman and Brent McClanahan who each rushed for more than 100 yards.

McClanahan's career-long 41-yard run on Minnesota's first play of the game set up quarterback Fran Tarkenton's 18-yard touchdown pass to tight end Stu Voigt. Eddie Brown gave his team some early scoring opportunities with big special teams plays, first returning the kickoff 26 yards to the 38-yard line, and later returning a punt 17 yards to the Vikings 45; but Washington was unable to capitalize. Following the kickoff return the Redskins went three-and-out, and on the first play after Brown's punt return, Billy Kilmer threw a pass that was intercepted by Bobby Bryant. With momentum seeming to slip away, on the first play after Bryant's pick, Washington took the ball right back with an interception by safety Jake Scott, who returned it 17 yards to the Minnesota 34-yard line. Three plays later, Mark Moseley kicked a 47-yard field goal that cut the Washington deficit to 7-3. Later in the quarter, Minnesota drove 66 yards and scored when Tarkenton threw a 27-yard pass to Sammy White. Safety Ken Houston deflected the ball, but it bounced to White, who made a diving juggling catch for a touchdown to put the Vikings up 14-3. By the end of the first quarter, the Vikings had gained 143 yards, while holding Washington to 18 yards and no first downs.

The situation only got worse for Washington in the second quarter. A promising drive into Vikings territory ended with no points when Moseley missed a 51-yard field goal attempt. Minnesota then drove 66 yards, featuring a 35-yard completion from Tarkenton to Ahmad Rashad, to score on Foreman's 2-yard touchdown run, putting them up 21-3. The Redskins' next drive ended with an interception by Nate Wright. On the next play, Houston intercepted the ball from Tarkenton and returned it 8 yards to the Vikings 38. But Washington was unable to move the ball and had to punt. In the final seconds of the half, Washington had a chance for a touchdown with a deep throw from Kilmer to receiver Frank Grant. Grant had broken open in the end zone, but was unable to make the catch and the pass fell incomplete.

Washington had to punt on the first drive of the second half, and Leonard Willis returned it 10 yards to the Vikings 48, from where Minnesota proceeded to drive to a 28-3 lead on a 30-yard touchdown burst by Foreman. This time the Redskins were able to respond, converting a 20-yard catch by tight end Jean Fugett, a 20-yard run by Mike Thomas, and a 10-yard reception by fullback John Riggins into a 35-yard Moseley field goal, making the score 28-6. But after this, the Vikings drove 77 yards and scored on a 9-yard pass from Tarkenton to White. By the time Kilmer completed two touchdown passes in the fourth quarter, the game was already out of reach.

This was only the second postseason meeting between the Redskins and Vikings, with Minnesota having won the previous meeting.

Previous playoff games
Minnesota leads 1–0 in all-time playoff games

1973

Washington Redskins 20 @ Minnesota Vikings 27

1973 NFC Divisional playoffs

==== AFC: Oakland Raiders 24, New England Patriots 21 ====
New England Patriots vs. Oakland Raiders – Game summary

Quarter	1	2	3	4	Total
Patriots	7	0	14	0	21
Raiders	3	7	0	14	24

at Oakland Coliseum, Oakland, California

- Game time: 4:00 p.m. EST
- Game attendance: 53,050
- Referee: Ben Dreith
- TV announcers (NBC): Curt Gowdy and Don Meredith

Game information

First quarter

- NE – Andy Johnson 1-yard run (John Smith kick). Patriots 7–0.
- OAK – Errol Mann 40-yard field goal. Patriots 7–3.

Second quarter

- OAK – Fred Biletnikoff 31-yard pass from Ken Stabler (Errol Mann kick). Raiders 10–7.

Third quarter

- NE – Russ Francis 26-yard pass from Steve Grogan (John Smith kick). Patriots 14–10.
- NE – Jess Phillips 3-yard run (John Smith kick). Patriots 21–10.

Fourth quarter

- OAK – Mark van Eeghen 1-yard run (Errol Mann kick). Patriots 21–17.
- OAK – Ken Stabler 1-yard run (Errol Mann kick). Raiders 24–21.

Top passers

- NE – Steve Grogan – 12/23, 167 yards, TD, INT
- OAK – Ken Stabler – 19/32, 233 yards, TD

Top rushers

- NE – Sam Cunningham – 20 rushes, 68 yards
- OAK – Mark van Eeghen – 11 rushes, 39 yards, TD

Top receivers

- NE – Russ Francis – 4 receptions, 96 yards, TD
- OAK – Fred Biletnikoff – 9 receptions, 137 yards, TD

The Raiders stormed into the 1976 playoffs in dominant form, with an NFL-best 13–1 record. However, their only loss of the season was to New England, a brutal 48–17 thrashing in week 4. New England finished the year with an 11–3 record, a spectacular turnaround after going 3–11 the previous season, to make their first playoff appearance since 1963.

The Raiders overcame an 11-point fourth quarter deficit to win on quarterback Ken Stabler's 1-yard touchdown run with 14 seconds left in the game.

Raiders return man Neal Colzie gave his team an early scoring opportunity by returning a New England punt 24 yards to the Pats' 46-yard line. Oakland was unable to move the ball, and despite a solid Ray Guy punt that pinned the Patriots back at their own 14-yard line, their defense could not stop New England from driving 86 yards in 10 plays to take a 7–0 lead on Andy Johnson's 1-yard rushing touchdown. The key plays of the drive were a spectacular one-handed 48-yard catch by tight end Russ Francis on 3rd down and 7 from the Patriots' 33-yard line, and a 24-yard 3rd-down reception by receiver Darryl Stingley. On Oakland's next possession, Stabler's completions to Fred Biletnikoff and Cliff Branch for gains of 22 and 17 yards set up Errol Mann's 40-yard field goal, making the score 7–3 with 1:14 left in the first quarter.

The score would not change until near the end of the second quarter, after Oakland defensive back Skip Thomas made a clutch interception in his own red zone of Francis passing on an option play, and returned it 18 yards to the Raiders' 24. Oakland subsequently drove 76 yards in 8 plays to score on Stabler's 31-yard touchdown pass to Biletnikoff with 45 seconds left in the half, giving the Raiders a 10–7 halftime lead.

New England regrouped in the second half. After forcing Oakland to punt on their opening drive, Steve Grogan led the Patriots 80 yards in 9 plays to score on his 26-yard touchdown completion to Francis. The Raiders had to punt again on their next possession, and New England got the ball with good field position on their own 45, where they drove 55 yards in 10 plays (aided by an offsides penalty on linebacker Ted Hendricks that allowed them to keep possession after a punt play) to go up 21–10 on Jess Phillips' 3-yard rushing touchdown with 1:13 left in the third period.

Oakland responded by driving 70 yards in 8 plays. Stabler was a perfect 5-for-5 passing on the drive, including a 17-yard completion to Biletnikoff on the last play of the third quarter, as the team cut their deficit to 21–17 on running back Mark Van Eeghen's 1-yard touchdown run. After an exchange of punts, New England got the ball on their own 48 with a huge chance to increase their lead or run out the clock to win the game. After driving to the Raiders' 28, on 3rd and 1 at the Raiders 28-yard line, Grogan changed the snap count to draw the Raiders offsides, but the Raiders were barking out dummy snap counts themselves and Hannah, Leon Gray, and Pete Brock all jumped offsides ("I should have known better", Grogan said afterward). On the next play (3rd and 6) Grogan threw to Russ Francis but Francis could not raise his arms because of holding by the Raiders Phil Villapiano, holding so blatant (but not called despite an official staring directly at them) that according to Francis, "(he left) bruise marks on my arm....when I saw Phil at the Pro Bowl that year, he came right out and told me he had done it.". Now on 4th down, the Patriots decided to gamble on a 50-yard field goal attempt by John Smith, but his kick was no good, giving the ball back to Oakland with good field position and 4:12 left on the clock.

Stabler then led the Raiders 68 yards for the game-winning score. Several key completions, including a 12-yard catch by Branch and a 21-yard reception by tight end Dave Casper, gave the team a first down on the Patriots' 28-yard line. But on the next play, Stabler was sacked for an 8-yard loss by DT Mel Lunsford. After an incompletion, Oakland faced 3rd and 18 on the 36-yard line. Stabler threw an incomplete pass on the next play, but it was eliminated by a controversial roughing the passer penalty called by referee Ben Dreith on nose tackle Ray "Sugar Bear" Hamilton, giving Oakland a first down on the Pats' 13 with 57 seconds remaining. Following a 5-yard catch by Casper and a 4-yard run by Clarence Davis, a personal foul penalty on safety Prentice McCray brought up first and goal at the 1-yard line. Now with time running out, Stabler faked a handoff to running back Pete Banaszak, who was stuffed at the line of scrimmage, and rolled to the left. Led by guard Gene Upshaw, Stabler dove into the end zone with 14 seconds left to give the Raiders a 24–21 lead. Linebacker Monte Johnson then sealed the win with an interception on the last play of the game.

Biletnikoff finished the game with 9 receptions for 137 yards and a touchdown. Francis had 4 catches for 96 yards and a score. Stabler completed 19/32 passes for 233 yards and a touchdown, with no interceptions, and scored a rushing touchdown as well.

Penalties played a huge role in the game. New England had 10 penalties, while the Raiders had 11. "That was one of the worst-called games I have ever seen in my life," said an angry Patriots DE Julius Adams. "I just hope they were right", Patriots coach Chuck Fairbanks said about the roughing the passer call against Ray Hamilton on Oakland's game-winning drive. "It looked to me like Ray Hamilton hit the ball first. If he did deflect the ball, it was an incorrect call." Later on, he added "I'm proud of my team and the way we played today. We’re going home knowing we played our hearts out."

"That's what you say," said Raiders Coach John Madden when the Pats' complaints were brought to his attention by a writer. "If you could sit there for 60 minutes and say the officials turned that game around with penalties at the end, you were wasting your time. You were eating a hot dog somewhere instead of watching what was going on. There was some great football out there."

This was the first postseason meeting between the Patriots and Raiders.

=== Sunday, December 19, 1976 ===
==== AFC: Pittsburgh Steelers 40, Baltimore Colts 14 ====
Pittsburgh Steelers vs. Baltimore Colts – Game summary

Quarter	1	2	3	4	Total
Steelers	9	17	0	14	40
Colts	7	0	0	7	14

at Memorial Stadium, Baltimore

- Game time: 2:00 p.m. EST
- Game attendance: 59,296
- Referee: Pat Haggerty
- TV announcers (NBC): Jim Simpson and John Brodie
- Boxscore

Game information

First quarter

- PIT – Frank Lewis 76-yard pass from Terry Bradshaw (kick failed). Steelers 6–0.
- PIT – Roy Gerela 45-yard field goal. Steelers 9–0.
- BAL – Roger Carr 17-yard pass from Bert Jones (Toni Linhart kick). Steelers 9–7.

Second quarter

- PIT – Reggie Harrison 1-yard run (Roy Gerela kick). Steelers 16–7.
- PIT – Lynn Swann 29-yard pass from Terry Bradshaw (Roy Gerela kick). Steelers 23–7.
- PIT – Roy Gerela 25-yard field goal. Steelers 26–7.

Third quarter

- No scoring plays

Fourth quarter

- PIT – Lynn Swann 11-yard pass from Terry Bradshaw (Roy Gerela kick). Steelers 33–7.
- BAL – Roosevelt Leaks 1-yard run (Toni Linhart kick). Steelers 33–14.
- PIT – Reggie Harrison 10-yard run (Ray Mansfield kick). Steelers 40–14.

Top passers

- PIT – Terry Bradshaw – 14/18, 264 yards, 3 TD
- BAL – Bert Jones – 11/25, 144 yards, TD, 2 INT

Top rushers

- PIT – Franco Harris – 18 rushes, 132 yards
- BAL – Lydell Mitchell – 16 rushes, 55 yards

Top receivers

- PIT – Frank Lewis – 2 receptions, 103 yards, TD
- BAL – Raymond Chester – 3 receptions, 42 yards

The Steelers, who lost four of their first five games during the season, dominated the Colts with 526 yards of total offense, while limiting Baltimore to only 170. Quarterback Terry Bradshaw completed 14 of 18 passes for 267 yards and three touchdowns, including a 76-yard bomb to Frank Lewis on the third play of the game, giving him the first perfect 158.3 passer rating in NFL playoff history. Steelers running back Franco Harris racked up 132 rushing yards on 18 carries, and caught 3 passes for 24 yards, despite leaving the game with an injury early in the third quarter. This was the only NFL playoff game in the 1970s where one team scored as many as 40 points, and the last until 1981 (the Epic in Miami).

Lewis' touchdown catch and a 45-yard Roy Gerela field goal gave the Steelers an early 9-0 lead. The Colts made it 9-7 late in the first period with Bert Jones' 17-yard touchdown pass to Roger Carr, but Theo Bell's 60-yard kickoff return set up a 32-yard drive to put the Steelers up 16-7 on Reggie Harrison's 1-yard touchdown run. Following a punt, they blew a scoring chance when Harrison lost a fumble at the Colts 2-yard line. But they soon made up for it with two scores in the final minute of the half. After getting the ball back, Bradshaw put the Steelers ahead 23-7 with a 29-yard touchdown pass to Lynn Swann. Then Glen Edwards intercepted a pass from Jones and returned it 26 yards to set up a 25-yard Gerela field goal that gave Pittsburgh a 26-7 halftime lead.

In the third quarter, the Colts had an odd drive in which they gained only 36 net yards in 13 plays. They faced an early 3rd and 6, but a sack on Jones was eliminated by a defensive holding penalty that gave them a first down. Then Lydell Mitchell appeared to lose a fumble, but officials ruled him down by contact before he lost the ball. David Lee soon came on to punt, but a roughing the kicker penalty on Larry Brown allowed them to keep the ball again. The drive finally ended with a turnover on downs at the Steelers 32, and Pittsburgh went on to drive 68 yards in 11 plays, scoring on Bradshaw's 11-yard touchdown pass to Swann. Now with a 33-7 fourth quarter lead, all that remained would be a touchdown from each team, a 1-yard run by Roosevelt Leaks and a 9-yard score by Harrison.

Less than ten minutes after the conclusion of the game, a small charter plane crashed into the upper deck at Memorial Stadium. There were no deaths or serious injuries in the accident.

This was the second postseason meeting between the Steelers and Colts. Pittsburgh won the first meeting the previous season.

Previous playoff games
Pittsburgh leads 1–0 in all-time playoff games

1975

Baltimore Colts 10 @ Pittsburgh Steelers 28

1975 AFC Divisional playoffs

==== NFC: Los Angeles Rams 14, Dallas Cowboys 12 ====
Los Angeles Rams vs. Dallas Cowboys – Game summary

Quarter	1	2	3	4	Total
Rams	0	7	0	7	14
Cowboys	3	7	0	2	12

at Texas Stadium, Irving, Texas

- Game time: 5:30 p.m. EST
- Game attendance: 63,283
- Referee: Fred Silva
- TV announcers (CBS): Pat Summerall and Tom Brookshier

Game information

First quarter

- DAL – Efren Herrera 44-yard field goal. Cowboys 3–0.

Second quarter

- LA – Pat Haden 4-yard run (Tom Dempsey kick). Rams 7–3.
- DAL – Scott Laidlaw 1-yard run (Efren Herrera kick). Cowboys 10–7.

Third quarter

- No scoring plays.

Fourth quarter

- LA – Lawrence McCutcheon 1-yard run (Tom Dempsey kick). Rams 14–10.
- DAL – Safety, Rusty Jackson ran out of end zone. Rams 14–12.

Top passers

- LA – Pat Haden – 10/21, 152 yards, 3 INT
- DAL – Roger Staubach – 15/37, 150 yards, 3 INT

Top rushers

- LA – Lawrence McCutcheon – 21 rushes, 58 yards, TD
- DAL – Preston Pearson – 13 rushes, 43 yards

Top receivers

- LA – Harold Jackson – 6 receptions, 116 yards
- DAL – Preston Pearson – 6 receptions, 41 yards

The Rams overcame two blocked punts by Dallas to avenge their blowout title game loss to the Cowboys the previous year with a 14–12 win in a defense dominated physical game at Texas Stadium.

Dallas opened the scoring with a 44-yard field goal, but Los Angeles responded with quarterback Pat Haden's 4-yard touchdown run. Late in the first half, Charlie Waters blocked a punt to set up running back Scott Laidlaw's 1-yard touchdown to give the Cowboys a 10–7 lead. Early in the final period, Rams kicker Tom Dempsey made what would have been a game-tying field goal, but Cliff Harris was called for a running into the kicker penalty on the play. The usually conservative Ram coach Chuck Knox uncharacteristically took the points off the board, giving Los Angeles a first down. A few plays later, Lawrence McCutcheon vindicated Knox's decision as he ran for a one-yard touchdown to give the Rams the lead, 14–10. With 1:59 remaining in the game, Waters blocked another punt and the Cowboys recovered the ball at the Los Angeles 17-yard line. On first down, Butch Johnson's reception was ruled incomplete because he could only get one foot down in bounds in the end zone. After two more incompletions, Staubach completed a pass to tight end Billy Joe DuPree at the 8, but he was immediately tackled by safeties Bill Simpson and Dave Elmendorf 1 yard short of the first down marker, causing a turnover on downs. After three running plays, and with the Cowboys out of time outs, the Rams faced a 4th and 14 with four seconds left in the game. Wary of another blocked punt, Coach Knox ordered Ram punter Rusty Jackson to step out of the back of the end zone for an intentional safety, and the Rams won 14–12.

"We said there was just no way they were getting into the end zone after they blocked that punt," said Simpson (a college teammate of DuPree at Michigan State University) after the game. "We've come through too far and gone through too much. Staubach went to the wide receivers twice before, and we figured he'd go to DuPree. We both dove for him the moment Staubach threw. I think I got a hand on the ball. We had to play him tough. Goddamn it was the whole season on one play. That stuff happened to us too much in the past. We're going all the way this time."

"Where the official marked the ball wasn't where I caught it", DuPree protested after the game. "That play was designed to get 10 yards."

The Ram defense held Dallas to only 85 rushing yards; Dallas' defense was equally stingy, allowing 120 rushing yards but the Rams needed 49 attempts to achieve this. Constant Ram pressure caused Staubach to have one of his worst playoff games ever as he was 15 of 37 for 150 yards; he was sacked 4 times and threw 3 interceptions. In addition, Staubach, who had hurt the Rams the year before with his scrambling runs, gained only 8 yards rushing. Ram QB Pat Haden couldn't do much better vs. Dallas' tough defense; he was 10 for 21 for 152 yards and also threw 3 interceptions.

This was the third postseason meeting between the Rams and Cowboys, with Dallas winning both previous meetings.

Previous playoff games
Dallas leads 2–0 in all-time playoff games

1973

Los Angeles Rams 16 @ Dallas Cowboys 27

1973 NFC Divisional playoffs

1975

Dallas Cowboys 37 @ Los Angeles Rams 7

1975 NFC Championship Game

== Conference championships ==
=== Sunday, December 26, 1976 ===
==== NFC: Minnesota Vikings 24, Los Angeles Rams 13 ====
Los Angeles Rams vs. Minnesota Vikings – Game summary

Quarter	1	2	3	4	Total
Rams	0	0	13	0	13
Vikings	7	3	7	7	24

at Metropolitan Stadium, Bloomington, Minnesota

- Game time: 1:00 p.m. EST
- Game weather: 14 °F (−10 °C), sunny
- Game attendance: 48,379
- Referee: Dick Jorgensen
- TV announcers (CBS): Pat Summerall and Tom Brookshier
- Boxscore

Game information

First quarter

- MIN – Bobby Bryant 90-yard blocked field goal return (Fred Cox kick). Vikings 7–0.

Second quarter

- MIN – Fred Cox 25-yard field goal. Vikings 10–0.

Third quarter

- MIN – Chuck Foreman 1-yard run (Fred Cox kick). Vikings 17–0.
- LA – Lawrence McCutcheon 10-yard run (kick failed). Vikings 17–6.
- LA – Harold Jackson 5-yard pass from Pat Haden (Tom Dempsey kick). Vikings 17–13.

Fourth quarter

- MIN – Sammy Johnson 12-yard run (Fred Cox kick). Vikings 24–13.

Top passers

- LA – Pat Haden – 9/22, 161 yards, TD, 2 INT
- MIN – Fran Tarkenton – 12/27, 143 yards, INT

Top rushers

- LA – Lawrence McCutcheon – 26 rushes, 128 yards, TD
- MIN – Chuck Foreman – 15 rushes, 118 yards, TD

Top receivers

- LA – Harold Jackson – 4 receptions, 70 yards, TD
- MIN – Chuck Foreman – 5 receptions, 81 yards

The Vikings forced a blocked field goal, a blocked punt, and two interceptions en route to the victory over the Rams. On offense, running back Chuck Foreman rushed for 118 yards and a touchdown on just 15 carries while also catching 5 passes for 81 yards.

In the first quarter, the Rams got off to a good start as they marched down the field to the Viking 2-yard line. The drive stalled there, and coach Chuck Knox, recalling the NFC championship game in Minnesota two years ago (when the Rams were intercepted in the end zone after driving to the Viking 2-yard line) ordered a field goal attempt. Nate Allen blocked the field goal attempt, and the ball bounced off the ground right into the waiting arms of Bobby Bryant, who returned it 90 yards for a Minnesota touchdown. The first quarter ended with the Rams dominating the stat sheet. They had run 22 plays for 89 yards and 7 first downs, while holding the Vikings to 5 plays, one first down, and 17 yards, but they still trailed 7-0.

In the second quarter, linebacker Matt Blair blocked and recovered a punt on the Rams 10-yard line to set up Fred Cox's 25-yard field goal to give the Vikings a 10–0 lead before halftime. Then in the third period, Foreman rushed 62 yards to the Los Angeles 2-yard line, and scored on a 1-yard touchdown run two plays later to increase the lead 17–0.

The Rams rallied back with two quick touchdowns in the third quarter. After a chance to put the game away was wiped out by Monte Jackson's interception of a Tarkenton pass in the end zone, Pat Haden led the Rams on an 80-yard drive highlighted by a 40-yard pass to Harold Jackson, and culminating in a 10-yard touchdown run by Lawrence McCutcheon. Rams kicker Tom Dempsey missed the extra point. Dempsey had missed nine extra points during the season. Announcers Pat Summerall and Tom Brookshier speculated that Haden was feeling pressure on this drive because Knox had James Harris warming up on the sidelines. On the Vikings' next drive, Fred Dryer hit Fran Tarkenton on a sack, forcing a fumble that was recovered by Jack Youngblood at the Viking 8-yard line. Three plays later, Haden hit Jackson for a 5-yard touchdown pass.

Late in the fourth quarter, the Vikings defense snuffed out two big chances for LA to take the lead. With 7 minutes left, the Rams drove to a third down on the Vikings 33, but Minnesota linebacker Wally Hilgenberg sacked Haden and forced a punt. With 2:40 left in the game, Los Angeles advanced to the Minnesota 39-yard line. On fourth down and needing more than a field goal, Haden thought he had Jackson open deep near the goal line, but Bryant intercepted the pass (his second of the game) rather than batting it down. A few plays later, Tarkenton dumped a short pass off to Foreman, which he turned into a 57-yard gain. Foreman was injured on the play, but backup running back Sammy Johnson scored the clinching touchdown from 12 yards out.

This turned out to be the last playoff game at Metropolitan Stadium. The Vikings played four playoff games between 1977 and 1981, all on the road. Minnesota's next home playoff game came after the strike-shortened 1982 season, the Vikings' first in the Hubert H. Humphrey Metrodome. They would next host an outdoor home playoff game in January 2016.

To date, this is the most recent NFC Championship that the Vikings have won.

This was the third postseason meeting between the Rams and Vikings, with Minnesota winning both previous meetings.

Previous playoff games
Minnesota leads 2–0 in all-time playoff games

1969

Los Angeles Rams 20 @ Minnesota Vikings 23

1969 NFL Western Conf. playoff

1974

Los Angeles Rams 10 @ Minnesota Vikings 14

1974 NFC Championship Game

==== AFC: Oakland Raiders 24, Pittsburgh Steelers 7 ====
Pittsburgh Steelers vs. Oakland Raiders – Game summary

Quarter	1	2	3	4	Total
Steelers	0	7	0	0	7
Raiders	3	14	7	0	24

at Oakland Coliseum, Oakland, California

- Game time: 4:00 p.m. EST
- Game attendance: 53,821
- Referee: Tommy Bell
- TV announcers (NBC): Curt Gowdy and Don Meredith
- Boxscore

Game information

First quarter

- OAK – Errol Mann 39-yard field goal. Raiders 3–0.

Second quarter

- OAK – Clarence Davis 1-yard run (Errol Mann kick). Raiders 10–0.
- PIT – Reggie Harrison 3-yard run (Ray Mansfield kick). Raiders 10–7.
- OAK – Warren Bankston 4-yard pass from Ken Stabler (Errol Mann kick). Raiders 17–7.

Third quarter

- OAK – Pete Banaszak 5-yard pass from Ken Stabler (Errol Mann kick). Raiders 24–7.

Fourth quarter

- No scoring plays

Top passers

- PIT – Terry Bradshaw – 14/35, 176 yards, INT
- OAK – Ken Stabler – 10/16, 88 yards, 2 TD

Top rushers

- PIT – Reggie Harrison – 11 rushes, 44 yards, TD
- OAK – Mark van Eeghen – 22 rushes, 66 yards

Top receivers

- PIT – Lynn Swann – 3 receptions, 58 yards
- OAK – Cliff Branch – 3 receptions, 46 yards

Pittsburgh had defeated the Raiders in the AFC championship game in each of the last two seasons. But with Steelers running backs Franco Harris and Rocky Bleier out of the game with injuries, this time the Raiders easily shut down Pittsburgh's offense.

Late in the first quarter, Bobby Walden's rushed punt went just 19 yards and gave Oakland the ball at the Steelers 38, setting up Errol Mann's 39-yard field goal. Then in the second quarter, Raiders linebacker Willie Hall intercepted a pass from Terry Bradshaw and returned it 25 yards to the Steelers 1-yard line. Three plays later, Clarence Davis' 1-yard touchdown run gave them a 10-0 lead. Although the game would end up as a defensive struggle with both teams combining for 14 punts (7 each) and only 457 yards (237 for Pittsburgh, 220 for Oakland), Hall's interception would be the only turnover of the day for either team.

The Steelers responded with Bradshaw's completions to Lynn Swann for gains of 18 and 30 yards leading to Reggie Harrison's 3-yard rushing touchdown. Oakland responded with a methodical 14-play, 69-yard scoring drive. With 19 seconds left in the first half, the Raiders faced first down at the Pittsburgh 4-yard line following a 16-yard burst by Clarence Davis. Oakland lined up three tight ends as if they were to run the ball, but quarterback Ken Stabler threw a play action pass to Warren Bankston for a touchdown to give the Raiders a 17–7 lead at halftime. Oakland controlled the entire second half, including a 12-play, 63-yard drive that featured a 28-yard completion from Stabler to receiver Cliff Branch. Stabler finished the drive with a 5-yard touchdown pass to Pete Banaszak that put the game out of reach at 24-7.

Oakland would not host another AFC title game until 2000, although the Raiders would host the 1983 AFC title game in Los Angeles. In fact, only one further playoff game would be played at the Oakland Coliseum prior to the Raiders' move to Los Angeles — a 27–7 victory over the Houston Oilers in the 1980 AFC Wild Card Game – until after the team's return to Oakland in 1995.

This was the fifth overall postseason meeting between the Steelers and Raiders, with Pittsburgh winning three of the previous four meetings. This is an NFL record for consecutive years to teams have met in the postseason. This was also the last conference championship game contested in December.

Previous playoff games
Pittsburgh leads 3–1 in all-time playoff games

1972

Oakland Raiders 7 @ Pittsburgh Steelers 13

1972 AFC Divisional playoffs

1973

Pittsburgh Steelers 14 @ Oakland Raiders 33

1973 AFC Divisional playoffs

1974

Pittsburgh Steelers 24 @ Oakland Raiders 13

1974 AFC Championship Game

1975

Oakland Raiders 10 @ Pittsburgh Steelers 16

1975 AFC Championship Game

== Super Bowl XI: Oakland Raiders 32, Minnesota Vikings 14 ==
Super Bowl XI – Oakland Raiders vs. Minnesota Vikings – Game summary

Quarter	1	2	3	4	Total
Raiders (AFC)	0	16	3	13	32
Vikings (NFC)	0	0	7	7	14

at Rose Bowl, Pasadena, California

- Date: January 9, 1977
- Game attendance: 103,438
- Referee: Jim Tunney
- TV announcers (NBC): Curt Gowdy and Don Meredith

This was the first postseason meeting between the Raiders and Vikings.

== Trivia ==
- The Patriots-Raiders semifinal matchup was the first AFC playoff game where both contestants were founding members of its predecessor, the AFL.
- Their victory in Dallas was the first road playoff win in the history of the Rams franchise.
