= Joe Greene =

American football player and coach (born 1946)

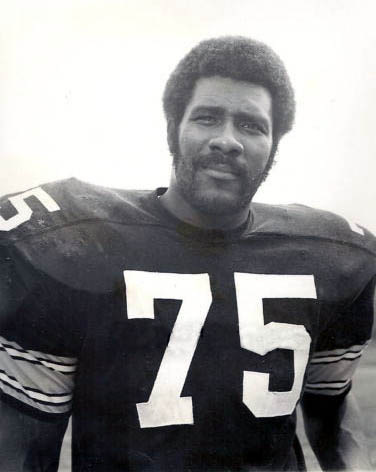
- Greene with the Pittsburgh Steelers in 1975

No. 75
- Position: Defensive tackle

Personal information
- Born: September 24, 1946 (age 80); Temple, Texas, U.S.
- Listed height: 6 ft 4 in (1.93 m)
- Listed weight: 275 lb (125 kg)

Career information
- High school: Dunbar (Temple)
- College: North Texas State (1966–1968)
- NFL draft: 1969: 1st round, 4th overall pick

Career history

Playing
- Pittsburgh Steelers (1969–1981)

Coaching
- Pittsburgh Steelers (1987–1991) Defensive line coach; Miami Dolphins (1991–1995) Defensive line coach; Arizona Cardinals (1996–2003) Assistant coach

Awards and highlights
- As a player: 4× Super Bowl champion (IX, X, XIII, XIV); 2× NFL Defensive Player of the Year (1972, 1974); NFL Defensive Rookie of the Year (1969); NFL Man of the Year (1979); 5× First-team All-Pro (1972–1974, 1977, 1979); 3× Second-team All-Pro (1971, 1975, 1976); 10× Pro Bowl (1969–1976, 1978, 1979); NFL 1970s All-Decade Team; NFL 75th Anniversary All-Time Team; NFL 100th Anniversary All-Time Team; Pittsburgh Steelers All-Time Team; Pittsburgh Steelers Hall of Honor; Pittsburgh Steelers No. 75 retired; Consensus All-American (1968); North Texas Mean Green No. 75 retired

Career NFL statistics
- Games played: 181
- Games started: 172
- Fumble recoveries: 16
- Interceptions: 1
- Sacks: 77.5
- Stats at Pro Football Reference
- Pro Football Hall of Fame
- College Football Hall of Fame

Charles Edward Greene (born September 24, 1946), better known as "Mean" Joe Greene, is an American former professional football player who was a defensive tackle for the Pittsburgh Steelers of the National Football League (NFL) from 1969 to 1981. A recipient of two NFL Defensive Player of the Year awards, five first-team All-Pro selections, and ten Pro Bowl appearances, Greene is widely considered to be one of the greatest defensive linemen to play in the NFL. He was noted for his leadership, fierce competitiveness, and intimidating style of play for which he earned his nickname.

Born and raised in Temple, Texas, Greene attended North Texas State University—now University of North Texas—where he earned consensus All-America honors as a senior playing for the North Texas State Eagles. He was selected by the Steelers fourth overall in the 1969 NFL draft and made an immediate impact with the team, as he was named the NFL's Defensive Rookie of the Year. Greene is credited with providing the foundation upon which Steelers coach Chuck Noll turned the dismal franchise into a sports dynasty. He was the centerpiece of the "Steel Curtain" defense that led Pittsburgh to four Super Bowl championships in a six-year span.

Throughout his career, Greene was one of the most dominant defensive players in the NFL, able to overpower opposing offensive linemen with ease and disrupt blocking. Former teammate Andy Russell called Greene "unquestionably the NFL's best player in the seventies". He is a member of the Pro Football Hall of Fame and the College Football Hall of Fame, and his number 75 jersey is one of only three retired by the Steelers. Greene is also well known for his appearance in the "Hey Kid, Catch!" Coca-Cola commercial, which aired during Super Bowl XIV and solidified his reputation as a "tough football player who's a nice guy".

== Early life and college ==
Charles Edward Greene was born September 24, 1946, in Temple, Texas. He played high school football at Dunbar High School in Temple. Despite Greene's talents, the Dunbar Panthers had a mediocre record, and he was not heavily recruited by colleges. His options were limited further due to segregation of the Southwest Conference. He was eventually offered a scholarship to play college football at North Texas State University (now University of North Texas), where he played for Odus Mitchell on the varsity team from 1966 to 1968. In the three seasons he played on the squad, they had a 23–15–1 record. With a per-carry average of less than two yards in his 39 games at defensive tackle, North Texas State limited the opposition to 2,507 yards on 1,276 rushes. Greene was a three-time All-Missouri Valley Conference selection.

In his junior season Greene married Agnes Craft, also a student at North Texas State and the daughter of a Dallas businessman. Tight on money, they were wed at Craft's sister's house in Dallas. Chuck Beatty, Greene's teammate at North Texas and later again in the NFL with the Steelers, served as best man.

As a senior, Greene was a consensus pick as a defensive tackle for the 1968 All-America team, earning first-team honors from United Press International (UPI), the Newspaper Enterprise Association, and The Sporting News, among others. His college coach, Rod Rust, said of Greene: "There are two factors behind Joe's success. First, he has the ability to make the big defensive play and turn the tempo of a game around. Second, he has the speed to be an excellent pursuit player." A pro scout said, "He's tough and mean and comes to hit people. He has good killer instincts. He's mobile and hostile."

== Nickname ==
While sources agree the name is a reference to North Texas's athletics teams, the Mean Green, there are conflicting accounts as to how, when, and why Greene received his "Mean Greene" nickname. When he first arrived at North Texas, the university's moniker was the Eagles. In 1966, Greene's first year on the varsity team, the team adopted the "Mean Green" moniker. Two possible origins of the nickname are two separate cheers that supposedly developed independently during North Texas' 1966 game against UTEP. One cheer was by Sidney Sue Graham, wife of the North Texas sports information director. In response to a tackle by Greene, she blurted out, "That's the way, Mean Greene!" Bill Mercer, former North Texas play-by-play announcer, states Graham's thought behind the nickname was the Mean Green defense. Meanwhile, in the student section, North Texas basketball players Willie Davis and Ira Daniels, unsatisfied with the unenthusiastic crowd, began to sing, "Mean Green, you look so good to me". The rest of the crowd soon followed. "After that we did it every game," Davis said. "A lot of people later on started associating it with Joe because his last name was Greene, but it actually started with that simple chant that Saturday night at Fouts Field. And that's the truth."

Although it stuck with him throughout his professional career due to his playing style, Greene himself was not fond of the nickname, insisting it did not reflect his true character. "I just want people to remember me as being a good player and not really mean," he said. "I want to be remembered for playing 13 years and contributing to four championship teams. I would like to be remembered for maybe setting a standard for others to achieve."

As for the “Joe” part of his nickname (since his given name was Charles, not Joseph), that came from one of his aunts. During a 2014 interview with NFL Films, Greene said that his aunt nicknamed him Joe due to his resemblance to boxing legend Joe Louis, who at the time of Greene's birth was in the middle of his 12-year reign as heavyweight champion. "She thought I was hefty and bulky enough to be called Joe Louis," Greene said. "She started calling me Joe, and it kind of stuck."

== Professional football career ==
The Pittsburgh Steelers franchise was one of the most downtrodden in the NFL, having experienced many losing seasons before the hiring of Chuck Noll as head coach in 1969. Noll and the Rooney family, which had owned the franchise since its formation, agreed that building the defensive line was crucial to rebuilding the team. Thus, they decided on Greene with the fourth pick of the 1969 NFL draft. The selection proved unpopular with fans and media, who were hoping for a player that would generate excitement; the relatively unknown Greene did not appear to meet their expectations. Meanwhile, Greene, who was highly competitive, was disappointed he was picked by a team that had such a reputation for losing. "I did not, did not want to be a Steeler," he admitted in a 2013 interview. Noll saw immense potential in Greene and insisted on drafting him. Ken Kortas, who had played in all 42 games as defensive tackle over the previous three seasons, was soon traded away to the Chicago Bears to accommodate him on the roster. In a matter of months, Greene established himself as one of the most dominant players in the league at his position. Despite his team finishing 1969 with a 1–13 record, the Associated Press (AP) named Greene the NFL Defensive Rookie of the Year, and he was invited to his first Pro Bowl.

Former teammate Andy Russell called Greene "unquestionably the NFL's best player in the seventies," saying "No player had a greater impact or did more for his team." Greene and coach Noll are widely credited with turning the Steelers franchise around. The Steelers finished 1970 with a 5–9 record and went 6–8 in 1971. Greene was invited to the Pro Bowl in both seasons. In 1972, Pittsburgh finished 11–3 and won its first division title and its first playoff game—the "Immaculate Reception" game against the Oakland Raiders. During the season, Greene tallied 11 quarterback sacks and 42 solo tackles, and he was recognized as the AP NFL Defensive Player of the Year. Miami Dolphins head coach Don Shula lauded Greene, saying, "He's just a super super star. It's hard to believe he isn't offside on every play. He makes the other team adjust to him." By this time, Noll had built a formidable defense. "We have maybe 10 guys now capable of making All-Pro," said Greene in 1972. "I'm just like all the other guys, doing my best in a team effort." With the drafting of defensive tackle Ernie Holmes in 1972, the Steelers assembled what became known as the "Steel Curtain" defensive line of Greene, Holmes, L. C. Greenwood, and Dwight White. Greene was invited to the Pro Bowl for 1973, joining White and Greenwood on the American Football Conference (AFC) roster.

Greene won his second AP NFL Defensive Player of the Year Award after the 1974 season, becoming the first player to receive the award multiple times. That year, he developed a new tactic of lining up at a sharp angle between the guard and center to disrupt the opposition's blocking assignments which he called the "stunt 4-3". His coaches were at first skeptical of the tactic and did not allow him to try it during the regular season. He first implemented the "stunt 4-3" against the Buffalo Bills in the division championship game. It proved to be highly effective, as it impeded Buffalo's blocking, and running back O. J. Simpson managed only 48 yards rushing. The following week, the Steelers faced the Oakland Raiders in the AFC championship game, with the defining match-up being Greene against All-Pro center Jim Otto. At one point Greene, consumed by emotions, kicked Otto in the groin. Later, on a third-down play, Greene threw Otto to the ground with one arm before leaping to sack quarterback Ken Stabler. Oakland was held to 29 rushing yards in the Steelers' 24–13 victory. On January 12, 1975, the Steelers won their first of four Super Bowl championships in a six-year span by defeating the Minnesota Vikings 16–6 in Super Bowl IX. In that game, lined up against center Mick Tingelhoff, Greene recorded an interception, forced fumble, and fumble recovery in what is considered one of the greatest individual defensive Super Bowl performances. Pittsburgh limited the Vikings to only 119 total yards of offense, 17 of which were gained on the ground. After the season, Greene was honored by the Pittsburgh Post-Gazette at its 39th Dapper Dan dinner as Pittsburgh's outstanding sports figure of the year.

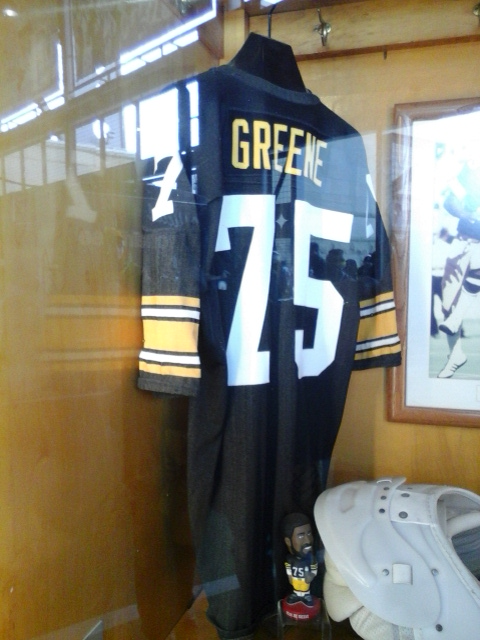
Greene's jersey displayed in the Heinz Field Walk of Fame

Greene missed four games in 1975 due to a pinched nerve, snapping a streak of 91 straight games started since he entered the league. In December 1975, he and the other members of the Steel Curtain appeared on the cover of Time magazine. After leading the Steelers to another Super Bowl win after the 1975 season over the Dallas Cowboys in Super Bowl X, Greene missed the first several games of the 1976 season with a back injury. The Steelers started off the season 1–4 and looked like they would not make the playoffs. Quarterback Terry Bradshaw was also injured and was replaced by rookie Mike Kruczek. Greene returned and the Steelers defense carried the team to nine-straight wins and the playoffs. With a defense considered one of the best in NFL history, the 1976 Steelers held opponents to an average of less than 10 points per game (138 points over 14 games). During their nine-game winning streak, the Steelers defense recorded five shutouts, including three straight, and surrendered a total of 28 points (roughly 3 points per game). The defense allowed only two touchdowns over those nine games. The Steelers were defeated by the Raiders in that year's AFC championship game.

By 1977, Greene was the captain of the Steelers defense, although his reduced effectiveness over the previous two seasons due to injuries led to rumors that he was washed up. He was never again able to attain the same success as a pass rusher after his pinched nerve in 1975. Spurred by the rumors, he returned in 1978 to lead all Pittsburgh linemen in tackles, and he had four sacks and a career-high five fumble recoveries. The Steelers defense allowed a league-low 195 points during the season, en route to a 35–31 victory over the Cowboys in Super Bowl XIII. In that contest, Greene had one of Pittsburgh's five sacks of Dallas quarterback Roger Staubach.

Pittsburgh finished the 1979 season with a 12–4 record, and ranked second in total defense and fifth in scoring defense. Greene was named a first-team All-Pro by the Pro Football Writers Association and Pro Football Weekly and was invited to his final Pro Bowl. He was also deemed the NFL's Man of the Year in recognition of his off-field contributions. In the AFC championship game against the Houston Oilers, the Steelers held NFL MVP Earl Campbell to just 15 rushing yards on 17 carries. Pittsburgh then defeated the Los Angeles Rams in Super Bowl XIV for an unprecedented fourth Super Bowl title. With the fourth title came Greene's fourth Super Bowl ring, inspiring his famous phrase, "one for the thumb", an allusion to winning a fifth championship. His wish went unfulfilled, however, as the Steelers failed to reach the playoffs in each of his final two seasons.

Greene retired as a player following the 1981 season. He finished his career having played in 181 out of a possible 190 games, and recorded 77.5 sacks (unofficially, as sacks were not an official statistic until 1982) and 16 fumble recoveries. His spot in the lineup was technically not replaced; the Steelers switched to a 3–4 defensive alignment for the 1982 season, which has only one nose tackle as opposed to two defensive tackles. The team has used the 3–4 as its base alignment continuously in the years since Greene's retirement, and more recently have used alignments that deploy only two true linemen.

== NFL career statistics ==
Legend
	NFL Defensive Player of the Year
	Won the Super Bowl
**Bold**	Career high

=== Regular season ===
Year	Team	Games		Sacks	Fumbles		Interceptions	
Year	Team	GP	GS	Sacks	FR	Yds	Int	Yds
1969	PIT	14	14	9.5	0	0	0	0
1970	PIT	14	14	8.0	0	0	0	0
1971	PIT	14	14	5.5	3	**7**	0	0
1972	PIT	14	14	**11.0**	1	0	0	0
1973	PIT	14	13	4.0	2	0	0	0
1974	PIT	14	14	9.0	4	3	**1**	**26**
1975	PIT	10	9	3.0	0	0	0	0
1976	PIT	14	14	6.0	0	0	0	0
1977	PIT	13	13	4.0	1	0	0	0
1978	PIT	16	16	4.5	**5**	0	0	0
1979	PIT	15	15	5.0	0	0	0	0
1980	PIT	15	15	3.5	0	0	0	0
1981	PIT	14	7	4.5	0	0	0	0
Career		181	172	77.5	16	10	1	26

=== Postseason ===
Year	Team	Games		Sacks	Fumbles	Interceptions	
Year	Team	GP	GS	Sacks	FR	Int	Yds
1972	PIT	2	2	0.0	0	0	0
1973	PIT	1	1	0.0	0	0	0
1974	PIT	3	3	1.0	**1**	**1**	**10**
1975	PIT	2	2	0.0	0	0	0
1976	PIT	2	2	1.0	0	0	0
1977	PIT	1	1	0.0	**1**	0	0
1978	PIT	3	3	**4.0**	0	0	0
1979	PIT	3	3	0.0	0	0	0
Career		17	17	7.0	2	1	10

== Attitude and playing style ==
He's tough and mean and comes to hit people. He has good killer instincts. He's mobile and hostile.

Greene's nickname remained popular due to his exploits on the playing field, where he was described as ferocious and intimidating. He instilled fear in opponents with the intensity of his play. In a 1979 game against the Houston Oilers, with only seconds remaining and Houston leading 20–17, the Oilers lined up near the Pittsburgh goal line to run their final play. With victory already assured for the Oilers, Greene pointed angrily across the line of scrimmage at Houston quarterback Dan Pastorini, warning, "If you come into the end zone, I'll beat the crap out of you! I'm gonna kill you!" Pastorini responded by taking a knee, ending the game. Afterward, Greene laughed and said, "I knew you weren't going to do it."

In his early years with the Steelers, Greene was at times uncontrollable, and often let his temper get the best of him. On one occasion during a 1975 game against the rival Cleveland Browns at Cleveland Municipal Stadium, Greene repeatedly kicked Browns lineman Bob McKay in the groin while McKay was lying on the ground. He also punched Denver Broncos guard Paul Howard and spat at quarterback Fran Tarkenton, and he frequently clashed with officials.

Greene and middle linebacker Jack Lambert became the emotional leaders of Pittsburgh's defensive squad. Greene was described as a huge presence both on and off the field. Joe Gordon of the Steelers front office recalled an instance in which a teammate was loudly voicing his discontent over the long and cold practice they had just gone through as he yanked off his equipment. At a nearby locker, Greene lifted his head and silently glared at him. "Believe me, that's all Joe did, he never even said anything," said Gordon. "I don't think the other players saw Joe glare at him. I think the other player just felt it, and then he sat down and never said another word." A natural leader, Greene was named the captain of the defense in 1977. His leadership was also channeled to the offense; Lynn Swann, a wide receiver, considered Greene a mentor. "If you were giving less than 100 percent, he let you know one way or the other," said Swann.

== Acting career ==
=== Coca-Cola commercial ===
Greene appeared in a famous commercial for Coca-Cola that debuted on October 1, 1979, and was aired during Super Bowl XIV on January 20, 1980. The ad won a Clio Award in 1980 for being one of the best commercials of 1979. It is widely considered to be one of the best television commercials of all time. The commercial helped shift the public's perception of Greene as hostile and unapproachable, to a soft-hearted "nice guy".

=== Other roles ===
While most well known for the Coca-Cola commercial, Greene has performed in other roles. One of his first acting roles was in The Black Six, a blaxploitation film starring other NFL players including fellow Hall of Famers Lem Barney, Willie Lanier, and Carl Eller. Greene also played himself in the movie ...All The Marbles, a TV movie on teammate Rocky Bleier, titled Fighting Back: The Rocky Bleier Story, and in Smokey and the Bandit II, in which he was ordered to "tackle that car" by Terry Bradshaw when Sheriff Buford T. Justice, played by Jackie Gleason, was in pursuit of Burt Reynolds' "Bandit". Greene then went and "tackled" Justice's patrol car, turning it completely over.

== Coaching career and later life ==
After retiring from the NFL, Greene spent one year, 1982, as a color analyst for NFL on CBS before becoming an assistant coach under Steelers' head coach Chuck Noll in 1987. He spent the next 16 years as an assistant coach with the Pittsburgh Steelers (1987–1991), Miami Dolphins (1991–1995), and Arizona Cardinals (1996–2003). In 2004, he retired from coaching and was named the special assistant for player personnel for the Steelers. In this position, he earned his fifth Super Bowl ring after the Steelers won Super Bowl XL. When asked how it felt to finally win "one for the thumb", he replied, "That's all utter nonsense. It's one for the right hand. It's one for this group, for this team." He earned a sixth ring from Super Bowl XLIII. Greene is one of four people outside the Rooney family to have Super Bowl rings from the first six championship seasons. He retired from his position in the Steelers front office in 2013.

In 2014, Greene was the subject of an episode of the NFL Network documentary series A Football Life, which chronicled his life and career. As of 2024, he resides in Flower Mound, Texas. His wife of 47 years, Agnes, with whom he had three children, died in 2015. He has since remarried to Charlotte Greene. Greene is known as "Papa Joe" to his seven grandchildren. In 2017, Greene released an autobiography entitled Mean Joe Greene: Built by Football.

In 2018, Greene set up the Agnes Lucille Craft Greene Memorial Scholarship in honor of his late wife. The scholarships are presented annually to students from Texas, whose parents have battled cancer.

== Legacy ==
I just want people to remember me as being
a good player and not really mean. I want to be
remembered for playing 13 years and contributing to
four championship teams. I would like to be remembered for maybe setting a standard for others to achieve.

Greene is recognized as one of the most dominant players to ever play in the NFL. He is widely considered one of the greatest defensive linemen in league history. His durability allowed him to play in 181 of a possible 190 games, including a streak of 91 straight to begin his career. The Steel Curtain defense is consistently ranked among the top defensive groups of all time. As of the death of L. C. Greenwood in September 2013, Greene is the last surviving member of the Steel Curtain.

=== Post-career honors ===
- In 1984, Greene was enshrined in the College Football Hall of Fame. He is the only former UNT player so honored.
- His number 75 jersey is retired by the North Texas football team, and he was inducted into the UNT Hall of Fame in 1981.
- He was inducted into the Pro Football Hall of Fame in 1987, a class which also included Larry Csonka, Len Dawson, Jim Langer, Don Maynard, Gene Upshaw, and John Henry Johnson.
- The Hall of Fame Selection Committee named Greene to the NFL 1970s All-Decade Team, honoring the best players of the decade. In 1994, he was selected by a 15-person panel of NFL and Pro Football Hall of Fame officials, former players, and media representatives to the NFL 75th Anniversary All-Time Team as one of the greatest players of the NFL's first 75 years.
- In 1999, Greene was deemed the 14th greatest player of all time by The Sporting News. He was ranked 13th on The Top 100: NFL's Greatest Players by the NFL Network in 2010.
- Greene is regarded among the greatest players in Steelers franchise history. His number 75 jersey was officially retired at halftime during the Steelers' game against the rival Baltimore Ravens on November 2, 2014. Greene also briefly wore number 72 during his rookie season before switching to his more familiar 75 mid-season. He is only the third Steeler to have his jersey formally retired, the first being Ernie Stautner and the other being Franco Harris. However, the Steelers had not reissued No. 75 since Greene's retirement, and it had been understood long before 2014 that no Steeler would ever wear it again.
- The University of North Texas, Greene's alma mater, unveiled a statue of him outside of Apogee Stadium in 2018. Greene is regarded as the most famous alum of UNT.
- In 2015, the Mean Joe Greene Community Football Field was dedicated in Greene's honor in his hometown of Temple, Texas.
- In 2018, University of North Texas, Greene's alma mater, dedicated a new residence hall, Joe Greene Hall | University of North Texas, in Greene's honor.
- In 2019, Greene was named to the NFL 100th Anniversary All-Time Team as one of the greatest players of the NFL's first 100 years.

== Notes and references ==
=== Bibliography ===
- Freedman, Lew; Hoak, Dick (2009). Pittsburgh Steelers: The Complete Illustrated History (illustrated ed.). MBI Publishing Company LLC. ISBN 978-0760336458.
- Millman, Chad; Coyne, Shawn (2010). The Ones Who Hit the Hardest: The Steelers, the Cowboys, the '70s, and the Fight for America's Soul. Penguin. ISBN 978-1101459935.
- Pomerantz, Gary M. (2014). Their Life's Work: The Brotherhood of the 1970s Pittsburgh Steelers (illustrated, reprint ed.). Simon and Schuster. ISBN 978-1451691634.
- Wexell, Jim (2006). Pittsburgh Steelers: Men of Steel (illustrated ed.). Sports Publishing LLC. ISBN 978-1582619965.
- Wexell, Jim; Mendelson, Abby; Aretha, David (2014). The Steelers Experience: A Year-by-Year Chronicle of the Pittsburgh Steelers (illustrated ed.). MVP Books. ISBN 978-0760345764.
