= Ernie Pough =

American gridiron football player (born 1952)

No. 22, 85, 82
- Positions: Wide receiver, return specialist

Personal information
- Born: May 17, 1952 (age 74); Jacksonville, Florida, U.S.
- Listed height: 6 ft 1 in (1.85 m)
- Listed weight: 174 lb (79 kg)

Career information
- High school: New Stanton Senior (Jacksonville)
- College: Texas Southern
- NFL draft: 1976: 3rd round, 88th overall pick

Career history
- Pittsburgh Steelers (1976–1977); New York Giants (1978); Edmonton Eskimos (1980)

Awards and highlights
- Grey Cup champion (1981)

Career NFL statistics
- Games played: 40
- Kick returns/ yards: 40/ 793
- Receptions/ yards: 10/ 166
- Rushes/ yards: 5/ 41
- Touchdowns: 1
- Stats at Pro Football Reference

Ernest Leon Pough (born May 17, 1952) is an American former professional football player who was a wide receiver for three seasons in the National Football League (NFL) for the Pittsburgh Steelers and New York Giants.

== Early life ==
Pough grew up in Jacksonville, Florida and attended college at Texas Southern University in Houston, Texas, a historically black college which at the time competed in Division II. He was a four-time All-America track athlete as well as a running back and wide receiver on the school's football team.

== Football career ==
Pough was selected by the Pittsburgh Steelers in the third round of the 1976 NFL draft. Although he was considered undersized for the NFL, his sprinter's speed (he ran the 100 yards in 9.3 seconds) made him a threat.

He played for the Steelers for two seasons before being traded along with guard Jim Clack to the New York Giants prior to the 1978 season in exchange for offensive lineman John Hicks. He played one season with the Giants and one for the Edmonton Eskimos of the Canadian Football League before ending his football career.
