= Wentford Gaines =

American football player (born 1953)

No. 36
- Positions: Defensive back, return specialist

Personal information
- Born: February 4, 1953 (age 73); Anderson, South Carolina, U.S.
- Listed height: 6 ft 0 in (1.83 m)
- Listed weight: 185 lb (84 kg)

Career information
- High school: Westside (Anderson)
- College: Ferrum College; Tennessee Tech; Cincinnati
- NFL draft: 1976: 9th round, 265th overall pick

Career history
- Pittsburgh Steelers (1978); Chicago Bears (1978–1980)

Awards and highlights
- Super Bowl champion (XIII)

Career NFL statistics
- Interceptions: 2
- Fumble recoveries: 1
- Sacks: 1
- Stats at Pro Football Reference

Wentford Elijah "Mumbo" Gaines (born February 4, 1953) is an American former professional football player who was a defensive back in the National Football League (NFL) for the Pittsburgh Steelers and Chicago Bears. He played college football for the Tennessee Tech Golden Eagles and Cincinnati Bearcats.

== Early life ==
Gaines was raised in Anderson, South Carolina. In high school, he was noted more for his basketball and track performances, but when he failed to receive any basketball scholarship offers, he decided to turn his attention to football. He attended Ferrum Junior College in Ferrum, Virginia. After two years at Ferrum he attended Tennessee Tech for a year before transferring to the University of Cincinnati where he played football and majored in Health Administration.

== Football career ==
Gaines was selected in the ninth round of the 1976 NFL draft by the Pittsburgh Steelers. He lost his first two seasons due to injuries — a pulled hamstring in 1976 and a sprained ankle suffered in the team's final preseason game of 1977. He finally made his NFL debut in 1978, but was cut by the Steelers after the season's first game.

The Chicago Bears signed Gaines a month later. He split time at left cornerback for the Bears with Terry Schmidt.

Gaines once again landed on the injury list after suffering a dislocated wrist in the Bears eighth game of 1980. His playing career ended when he was cut by the Bears during training camp in 1981.

== Post-football life ==
Gaines has twin sons, Jerrid and Jerrod. Jerrid played college football at Miami University and attended camps with both the Cleveland Browns and Cincinnati Bengals in 2008. As of 2011 Gaines was coaching football at Lincoln High School in Jersey City, New Jersey.
