= Dave Mays =

American football player (born 1949)

No. 10
- Position: Quarterback

Personal information
- Born: June 20, 1949 (age 77); Pine Bluff, Arkansas, U.S.
- Listed height: 6 ft 1 in (1.85 m)
- Listed weight: 204 lb (93 kg)

Career information
- High school: Southern University Lab (Baton Rouge, Louisiana)
- College: Texas Southern
- NFL draft: 1971: undrafted

Career history
- Los Angeles Rams (1972)*; Shreveport Steamer (1974); Cleveland Browns (1976–1977); Buffalo Bills (1978)
- * Offseason or practice squad member only

Career NFL statistics
- Passing attempts: 156
- Passing completions: 80
- Completion percentage: 51.3%
- TD–INT: 7–11
- Passing yards: 937
- Passer rating: 55.4
- Stats at Pro Football Reference

David W. Mays III (born June 20, 1949) is an American former professional football player who was a quarterback in the National Football League (NFL). He played college football for the Texas Southern Tigers. He played professionally in the World Football League (WFL) in 1974, then in the NFL for three seasons with the Cleveland Browns and Buffalo Bills.

== Football career ==
Mays began his pro football career in 1974 with the World Football League's Houston Texans and Shreveport Steamer before coming to the NFL. He is remembered for filling in for Brian Sipe of the Cleveland Browns, who was knocked out of a game on October 10, 1976, against the Pittsburgh Steelers. Mays started the season as the third-string quarterback and had never played in the NFL regular season before. He led the Browns to an 18–16 victory.

== Personal life ==
Mays was a Doctor of Dental Surgery, even during his playing days with the Browns. He practiced dentistry for 20 years in Greater Cleveland. He was accused of the 1990 attempted murder of the dentist to whom he had sold his practice, but was acquitted in a 1992 trial. In 1994, he was found guilty of welfare fraud for operating a phony billing scheme.

== See also ==
- Racial issues faced by black quarterbacks
