= Jim Clack =

American football player (1947–2006)

No. 50, 56, 58
- Positions: Center, guard

Personal information
- Born: October 26, 1947; Rocky Mount, North Carolina, U.S.
- Died: April 7, 2006 (aged 58); Greensboro, North Carolina, U.S.
- Listed height: 6 ft 3 in (1.91 m)
- Listed weight: 250 lb (113 kg)

Career information
- High school: Rocky Mount (NC)
- College: Wake Forest
- NFL draft: 1969: undrafted

Career history
- Pittsburgh Steelers (1969–1977); New York Giants (1978–1981)

Awards and highlights
- 2× Super Bowl champion (IX, X)
- Stats at Pro Football Reference

James Thomas Clack (October 26, 1947 – April 7, 2006) was an American professional football center and guard in the National Football League (NFL). He played for 12 seasons between 1970 and 1981. He died of heart failure in 2006 after suffering from cancer for four years.

Clack attended Rocky Mount High School in Rocky Mount, North Carolina. He was a member of Rocky Mount's 1962 and 1963 North Carolina 4A state champion football teams. He was also a member of Rocky Mount's 1963 4A state champion basketball team.

He graduated from Wake Forest University. He began his career with the Pittsburgh Steelers, and he was part of two Super Bowl championship teams in 1974 and 1975.

In April 1978, the Steelers traded Clack (along with wide receiver Ernie Pough) to the New York Giants in exchange for offensive lineman John Hicks. Clack spent four seasons with the Giants.

Clack was the Center who snapped the ball to Quarterback Joe Pisarcik. Pisarcik fumbled the ball, attempting to hand off to Fullback Larry Csonka. Hitting the hip of Csonka the ball bounced in to the hands of Herman Edwards who returned the fumble for a touchdown at the end of the November 19, 1978 game between the Giants and the Philadelphia Eagles at Giants Stadium, costing the team a certain victory in a play since known as "The Miracle at the Meadowlands" to Eagles' fans and "The Fumble" to Giants' fans. The last-second win propelled the Eagles into the playoffs and prompted the NFL to adopt the "kneel down" play, otherwise known as the "victory formation" to end games.

Clack was inducted into Wake Forest's Athletic Hall of Fame in 1991 and into the North Carolina Sports Hall of Fame in 2004.
