= Jack Deloplaine =

American football player (1954–2022)

No. 35, 33
- Position: Running back

Personal information
- Born: April 21, 1954; Pottstown, Pennsylvania, U.S.
- Died: August 2, 2022 (aged 68); Anderson, South Carolina, U.S.
- Listed height: 5 ft 10 in (1.78 m)
- Listed weight: 205 lb (93 kg)

Career information
- High school: Pottstown (PA)
- College: Salem
- NFL draft: 1976: 6th round, 182nd overall pick

Career history
- Pittsburgh Steelers (1976–1977); Washington Redskins (1978); Pittsburgh Steelers (1978-1979); Chicago Bears (1979)

Awards and highlights
- 2× Super Bowl champion (XIII, XIV)

Career NFL statistics
- Rushing attempts: 37
- Rushing yards: 165
- Rushing TDs: 2
- Stats at Pro Football Reference

Jack A. Deloplaine (April 21, 1954 – August 2, 2022) was an American professional football player who was a running back for four seasons in the National Football League (NFL). He played for the Pittsburgh Steelers, Washington Redskins, and Chicago Bears from 1976 to 1979, having earlier played college football for the Salem Tigers.

== Early life ==
Deloplaine was born in Pottstown, Pennsylvania, on April 21, 1954. He attended Pottstown Senior High School in his hometown. He then studied at Salem College, where he played for the Salem Tigers. During his tenure with the team, he was selected as an All-WVIAC four times and was an AP College Division All-American. He led the National Association of Intercollegiate Athletics (NAIA) in scoring in 1975 with 22 touchdowns in 11 games for a total of 132 points. Deloplaine was conferred the Hardman Award in 1975, after being recognized as best amateur athlete in West Virginia by the state's sports writers association. He was also honored as an NAIA All-American and named the team's offensive most valuable player that same year. Deloplaine was drafted by the Pittsburgh Steelers in the sixth round (182nd overall) of the 1976 NFL draft, becoming the first player from Salem to be drafted into the NFL.

== Professional career ==
Deloplaine gained the nickname "Hydroplane" from Steelers broadcaster Myron Cope, because of his running ability in wet conditions during training camp prior to the 1976 season. He made his NFL debut with the Steelers on September 12, 1976, at the age of 22, in a 31–28 loss against the Oakland Raiders. He subsequently registered 205 total return yards in a 30–27 defeat to the New England Patriots on September 26 that same year, in his third game of the season. The most productive game of his career came on November 7, 1976, when he rushed six times for 64 yards and scored the only two touchdowns of his NFL career in a 45–0 blowout against the Kansas City Chiefs. He suffered a knee injury in the last game of his rookie season against the Houston Oilers, which precipitated injuries in the following seasons, and underwent surgery in the offseason.

Deloplaine won two Super Bowl rings when the Steelers emerged victorious in the Super Bowl XIII and Super Bowl XIV. However, he did not register a statistic in either championship game, and was limited to just three games in the former playoff series. He had earlier been placed on waivers before the 1978 season and was claimed by the Washington Redskins. He played just two games with the franchise, before being waived again and claimed back by the Steelers. He played ten regular season games with the team in 1978, with the three playoff games netting him an extra $32,000 in income. Before the start of the 1979 season, Deloplaine lost his place to rookie Anthony Anderson – who was regarded as the superior special teams player – and was once again placed on waivers, eventually signing with the Chicago Bears. He played five games for the team before rejoining the Steelers, becoming the only player to be cut by Chuck Noll and later re-acquired at the time. Although the New York Giants were keen to sign Deloplaine, he was unable to pass a physical and this ultimately spelled the end of his NFL career. During his four seasons in the NFL, he accumulated 165 yards rushing 37 times in 40 games played. He intended to continue playing football with the semi-professional Pittsburgh Wolfpack.

Deloplaine signed with the Toronto Argonauts of the Canadian Football League in early June 1980, after NFL teams mistakenly concluded that he had retired. However, he was released less than a week later when coach Willie Wood adjudged him to have inadequate speed. He signed with the newly established Pittsburgh Maulers of the United States Football League in January 1984, but retired at the end of that same month before the start of the 1984 season.

== Honors and awards ==
Deloplaine was inducted into the Salem University Athletic Hall of Fame in 1988. He was also a member of his hometown's sports hall of fame. The Jack Deloplaine Leadership Award – given annually to a student at his alma mater who demonstrates "athletic spirit, achievement and leadership" – is named in his honor. The school's athletic department also hosts a namesake golf tournament every summer to recognize Deloplaine's achievements.

== Personal life ==
After retiring from professional football, Deloplaine worked as an athletic director at a prison in Pittsburgh. He also headed a strength and conditioning program at North Catholic High School, and served as running backs coach at Pine-Richland High School. He often attended Steelers games and was invited to the team's final game at Three Rivers Stadium in 2000. He also played in charity basketball events hosted by the Steelers and featured as a guest on the television special Kenny Rogers' America and at the Special Olympics.

Deloplaine was married to Kathy. Together, they had two children: Ryan and Todd. The latter followed in his father's footsteps and played football in high school, in addition to ice hockey and baseball. The family resided in the North Side of Pittsburgh, before relocating to South Carolina during his later years. Deloplaine died on August 2, 2022, at the age of 68.
