= Warren Bankston =

American football player (born 1947)

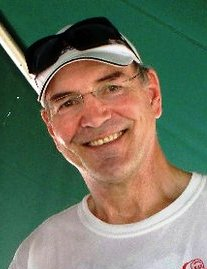
- Bankston in 2011

No. 46
- Positions: Running back, Tight end

Personal information
- Born: July 22, 1947 (age 79); Baton Rouge, Louisiana, U.S.
- Listed height: 6 ft 4 in (1.93 m)
- Listed weight: 235 lb (107 kg)

Career information
- High school: Hammond (Hammond, Louisiana)
- College: Tulane
- NFL draft: 1969: 2nd round, 42nd overall pick

Career history
- Pittsburgh Steelers (1969–1972); Oakland Raiders (1973–1978)

Awards and highlights
- Super Bowl champion (XI)

Career NFL statistics
- Rushing yards: 684
- Rushing average: 4.1
- Receptions: 38
- Receiving yards: 283
- Total touchdowns: 5
- Stats at Pro Football Reference

Warren Stephen Bankston (born July 22, 1947) is an American former professional football player who was a running back and tight end for ten seasons with the Pittsburgh Steelers and Oakland Raiders in the National Football League (NFL). He played college football for the Tulane Green Wave.

Bankston played at fullback for the Steelers for four seasons: 1969–1972. When the Steelers tried him at tight end in an exhibition game during the 1973 preseason, the Raiders, who needed a tight end, spotted him. They traded for him, and he went to the Raiders at the preseason's end.

During the 1976 season, from which the Raiders went on to Super Bowl XI, Bankston, as team captain, called the coin flip correctly for every game but one. He called it correctly again at the Super Bowl itself, which the Raiders won. He was very popular with the fans due to his practice of throwing the football into the stands when he scored.

Before attending Tulane University, Bankston was quarterback for the Hammond High School (Louisiana) Tornadoes and finished in the Class of 1965. At Hammond High he was elected to the National Honor Society and the Kiwanis-related Key Club, besides lettering in football, basketball, and track during all four years.
