= Pat Haggerty (American football official) =

American football official (1927–1994)

- Born: June 30, 1927; Denver, Colorado, U.S.
- Died: December 9, 1994 (aged 67)
- Education: Colorado State College of Education
- Occupations: Educator, coach, NFL referee
- Known for: NFL referee (3 Super Bowls)

Patrick Andrew Haggerty (June 30, 1927 – December 9, 1994) was an American football official in the National Football League (NFL) from 1965 to 1992. In his 28 seasons in the NFL, he was selected as the referee in three Super Bowls, XIII in 1979, XVI in 1982, and XIX in 1985. He wore the number 40 for most of his career (was number 4 from the 1979 to 1981 NFL seasons when the numbering system for officials was temporarily modified). Haggerty's trademark signal upon a team scoring a touchdown, field goal or extra point, featured raising both arms, but momentarily pausing them before raising them over his head.

Football was always a Haggerty pastime, even with Jim, Pat's brother. Pat's cousin, Donald "Cal" Snyder (1909–1975) was 1935 NIAA All-conference quarterback at Kearney State Teachers College (now the University of Nebraska at Kearney).

Haggerty attended Denver North High School in Denver, Colorado, and played basketball and baseball at the Colorado State College of Education (now the University of Northern Colorado) in Greeley.

Following college, Haggerty played minor league baseball in the Detroit Tigers organization, including one year with the Denver Bears in 1953. After deciding that baseball was not going to be his career, he turned to teaching and started at Valverde Elementary School in Denver and later was a teacher and coach at Abraham Lincoln High School in Denver.

Prior to joining the NFL, his previous officiating experience included college football and basketball in the Big Eight Conference and Western Athletic Conference.

At Super Bowl XIX, he supervised the coin toss that was conducted by President Ronald Reagan from the Oval Office of the White House via satellite, with Pro Football Hall of Fame running back Hugh McElhenny joining captains from the Miami Dolphins and San Francisco 49ers at Stanford Stadium in California. Reagan had been sworn in for his second term as president in a private ceremony earlier that day, with the public inauguration held the next day, since January 20, 1985 fell on a Sunday.

After retiring from active officiating after the 1992 season, Haggerty continued to work for the NFL, monitoring how games were called and scouting college officials as potential new NFL officials.

Haggerty died from cancer in 1994 at age 67 and is buried at Linn Grove Cemetery in Greeley. He was nominated as a 2005 Pro Football Hall of Fame candidate in Canton, Ohio as a contributor.
