= Theo Bell =

American football player (1953–2006)

No. 83
- Position: Wide receiver

Personal information
- Born: December 21, 1953; Bakersfield, California, U.S.
- Died: June 21, 2006 (aged 52); Tampa, Florida, U.S.
- Listed height: 6 ft 0 in (1.83 m)
- Listed weight: 185 lb (84 kg)

Career information
- High school: Bakersfield
- College: Arizona
- NFL draft: 1976: 4th round, 120th overall pick

Career history
- Pittsburgh Steelers (1976–1980); Tampa Bay Buccaneers (1981–1985)

Awards and highlights
- 2× Super Bowl champion (XIII, XIV); First-team All-American (1975)

Career NFL statistics
- Receiving yards: 2,375
- Receptions: 136
- Receiving touchdowns: 8
- Games played: 127
- Stats at Pro Football Reference

Theopolis Bell Jr. (December 21, 1953 – June 21, 2006) was an American professional football wide receiver who played nine seasons in the National Football League (NFL) for the Pittsburgh Steelers and Tampa Bay Buccaneers.

Bell, who was born and raised in Bakersfield, California, played college football at the University of Arizona and was selected in the fourth round of the 1976 NFL draft by the Steelers. He was with the Steelers from 1976 to 1980, earning Super Bowl rings in 1979 and 1980. He missed the 1977 season because of an injury. He is the Steelers' second-leading career punt returner, behind Rod Woodson.

Bell spent his first three years as a reserve, rising to a starting role in 1980 due to injuries to both Lynn Swann and John Stallworth. His 25.8 yards-per-catch average led the AFC that year. He then held out of training camp the next year, hoping to get a salary increase based on his performance. He was instead waived, and was claimed by the Buccaneers, where he replaced Mike Shumann on the roster. He started 13 of 70 games he appeared in for the Bucs and had 95 catches for 1,470 yards and four touchdowns.

During Bell's second season with the Steelers, his first wife, Kathy, appeared on Card Sharks and won several games for a total of $23,000 in prize money.

He died in Tampa, Florida at age 52 after suffering from scleroderma and kidney disease. Scleroderma is a chronic disease that causes skin thickening and tightening and can cause damage to internal organs.
