= Reggie Harrison =

American football player (born 1951)

No. 32, 46
- Position: Running back

Personal information
- Born: January 9, 1951 (age 75); Somerville, New Jersey, U.S.
- Listed height: 5 ft 11 in (1.80 m)
- Listed weight: 218 lb (99 kg)

Career information
- High school: Washington-Liberty (Arlington, Virginia)
- College: Cincinnati
- NFL draft: 1974: 9th round, 215th overall pick

Career history
- St. Louis Cardinals (1974); Pittsburgh Steelers (1974–1977)

Awards and highlights
- 2× Super Bowl champion (IX, X)

Career NFL statistics
- Rushing attempts: 139
- Rushing yards: 631
- Rushing touchdowns: 8
- Stats at Pro Football Reference

Kamal Ali Salaam-El (born Reginald Harrison, January 9, 1951) is an American former professional football player who was a running back for four seasons in the National Football League (NFL) with the Pittsburgh Steelers and St. Louis Cardinals. He played college football for the Cincinnati Bearcats. In 2000, he changed his name to Kamal Ali Salaam-El in an effort to embrace his Moorish heritage.

== Career highlights ==
Harrison is best remembered for blocking Mitch Hoopes' punt in the fourth quarter against the Dallas Cowboys in Super Bowl X. The ball went through the back of the end zone for a safety, cutting the Cowboys' lead to 10–9. The Steelers went on to win 21–17. He is also well known for being the road roommate of Frenchy Fuqua during his career with the Steelers. The two remain close friends to this day.

Harrison was one of the Steelers' two healthy running backs (along with Fuqua) when the team met the Oakland Raiders in the 1976 AFC Championship game. He ran for 44 yards and a touchdown as the Steelers lost to the Raiders 24–7.

Harrison grew up in Arlington, Virginia, where he starred as a running back for Washington-Lee High School. In the final traditional "Old Oaken Bucket" game against Alexandria, Virginia rival George Washington High School, he scored six touchdowns. Graduating in 1969, he played at the University of Cincinnati before being drafted by the NFL in 1974.
