= Mike Kruczek =

American football player and coach (born 1953)

Profile
- Position: Quarterback

Personal information
- Born: March 15, 1953 (age 73); Washington, D.C., U.S.
- Listed height: 6 ft 2 in (1.88 m)
- Listed weight: 202 lb (92 kg)

Career information
- High school: St. John's (Washington, D.C.)
- College: Boston College
- NFL draft: 1976: 2nd round, 47th overall pick

Career history

Playing
- Pittsburgh Steelers (1976–1979); Washington Redskins (1980)

Coaching
- Florida State (1982–1983) Quarterbacks coach; Jacksonville Bulls (1984) Quarterbacks coach; UCF (1985–1997) Offensive coordinator / quarterbacks coach; UCF (1998–2003) Head coach; Arizona Cardinals (2004–2006) Quarterbacks coach; Arizona Cardinals (2006) Offensive coordinator; California Redwoods (2009) Offensive coordinator; Sacramento Mountain Lions (2010–2011) Offensive coordinator / quarterbacks coach; UMass (2012) Offensive coordinator / quarterbacks coach; Trinity Prep (2013–2022) Head coach

Awards and highlights
- 2× Super Bowl champion (XIII, XIV); George H. "Bulger" Lowe Award (1975); First-team All-East (1975); Second-team All-East (1974)

Career NFL statistics
- Passing attempts: 154
- Passing completions: 93
- Completion percentage: 60.4%
- TD–INT: 0–8
- Passing yards: 1,185
- Passer rating: 62.8
- Stats at Pro Football Reference
- Coaching profile at Pro Football Reference

Michael Francis Kruczek (born March 15, 1953) is an American football coach and former quarterback. He is currently the offensive coordinator, under his son Garrett Kruczek, the head football coach for Lake Brantley High School of Florida.

== Playing career ==
Kruczek earned All-America in 1975 as a quarterback at Boston College where he set several B.C. passing and total offense records.

- 1974: 104/151 for 1,275 yards with 6 TD vs 7 INT
- 1975: 107/164 for 1,132 yards with 6 TD vs 7 INT

He was selected in the second round of the 1976 NFL draft by the Pittsburgh Steelers. He played in 29 games for them from 1976 to 1979 and was a member of Super Bowl championship squads in 1978 and 1979.

Kruczek distinguished himself in the NFL by winning six consecutive starts as a rookie in 1976 when he stepped into the Steelers starting lineup for an injured Terry Bradshaw; buoyed by the historic rushing duo of Franco Harris and Rocky Bleier (who became only the second pair of teammates to each run for 1,000 yards in the same season), and a fierce defense which recorded three shutouts and allowed only 25 points (4.2 ppg) during his six starts, Kruczek helped lead the Steelers to the AFC title game. During the victory streak Kruczek did not throw a touchdown pass, however for the season he completed passes at an impressive 60% rate along with an excellent average of 8.9 yards/attempt, and a solid 74.5 passer rating (compared to the league average rating of 67.0). He unexpectedly ended up as Bradshaw's primary backup as a rookie following the team waiving both of their backup quarterbacks from the previous four years (Terry Hanratty and Joe Gilliam), and the Steelers opting not to sign a third quarterback; Kruczek would have likely been the third-stringer behind Gilliam if not for his drug addiction.

Kruczek's record for consecutive wins as a rookie stood until 1985 when it was broken by Los Angeles Rams quarterback Dieter Brock who, at age 34, won seven consecutive starts to begin his first NFL season. Brock was an unusual rookie, having spent his prior 11 years (1974–1984) playing professionally in the Canadian Football League before joining the Rams.

Taking the more conventional route (college to the NFL), in 2004 a Pittsburgh quarterback again claimed the consecutive rookie wins record when 22-year-old Steelers rookie Ben Roethlisberger won 13 games to begin his career.

Kruczek concluded his NFL career in 1980 with the Washington Redskins. During his career Kruczek never threw a touchdown pass in a regular season game and currently holds the league record for career pass attempts, 154, without a touchdown.

== Coaching career ==
Kruczek began his coaching career as the quarterbacks coach for Bobby Bowden at Florida State from 1982 to 1983. He served one season in the same capacity for the Jacksonville Bulls of the USFL before he became the offensive coordinator and quarterbacks coach at the University of Central Florida. He was named UCF's head coach in 1998 when 13-year coach Gene McDowell was forced to resign due to a cellular phone fraud scandal. Kruczek's run as coach benefited from the fact that he inherited future NFL Pro Bowl quarterback Daunte Culpepper as a recruit from the McDowell era.

Kruczek led the fledgling Division I-A program to some of its biggest successes. In his first season, he led the Knights to a 9–2 record and had a verbal commitment to playing in the first Oahu Bowl. However, those plans were dashed when Miami upset undefeated UCLA, and the resulting domino effect left the Knights out of what would have been their first bowl game ever. Another highlight was an upset win over the 3–8 University of Alabama Crimson Tide in 2000, which gave UCF its first victory over a program from a Bowl Championship Series automatic qualifying conference.

Kruczek's UCF Knights squad joined the Mid-American Conference as a football-only member starting in the 2002 season, with many pundits expecting the team to win the MAC's Eastern Division championship. After a successful debut season in 2002 in which Kruczek's team finished 7–5 and earned second place in the MAC East, UCF struggled mightily in 2003, going 3–9. Starting quarterback Ryan Schneider was dismissed from the team for academic violations and UCF had a 3–7 record before Kruczek was dismissed with two games remaining in the season. After a loss to MAC bottom dweller Eastern Michigan, Kruczek was fired despite having signed a three-year contract extension at the start of the season. Kruczek was replaced by George O'Leary for the 2004 season.

== Personal life ==
Kruczek and his wife, Leigh, have two children: a daughter, Kelly, and a son, Garrett.

== Head coaching record ==
=== College ===
Year	Team	Overall	Conference	Standing	Bowl/playoffs
UCF Knights (NCAA Division I-A independent) (1998–2001)
1998	UCF	9–2			
1999	UCF	4–7			
2000	UCF	7–4			
2001	UCF	6–5			
UCF Knights (Mid-American Conference) (2002–2003)
2002	UCF	7–5	6–2	2nd (East)	
2003	UCF	3–7	2–4	5th (East)	
UCF:		36–30	8–6		
Total:		36–30			
