= Ravens–Steelers rivalry =

National Football League rivalry

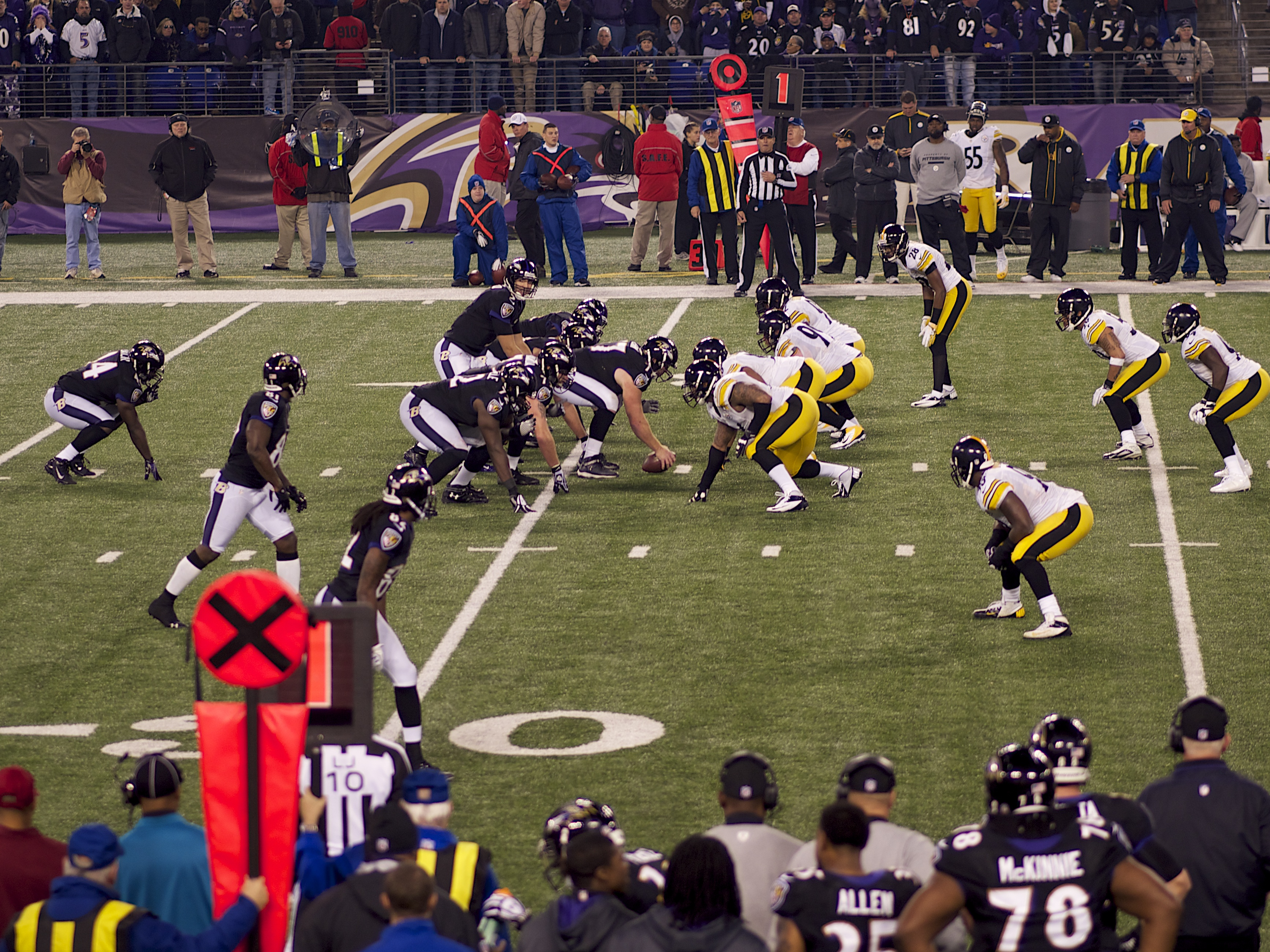
- Ravens and Steelers face off during the 2012 season.

- Baltimore Ravens Pittsburgh Steelers
- Location: Baltimore, Pittsburgh
- First meeting: September 8, 1996; Steelers 31, Ravens 17
- Latest meeting: January 4, 2026; Steelers 26, Ravens 24
- Next meeting: December 20, 2026
- Stadiums: Ravens: M&T Bank Stadium; Steelers: Acrisure Stadium

Statistics
- Total meetings: 65
- All-time series: Steelers: 38–27
- Regular season series: Steelers: 35–25
- Postseason results: Steelers: 3–2
- Largest victory: Ravens: 35–7 (2011); Steelers: 37–0 (1997)
- Most points scored: Ravens: 38 (2017); Steelers: 43 (2014)
- Longest win streak: Ravens: 4 (2014–2016); Steelers: 5 (1997–1999, 2001–2003)
- Current win streak: Steelers: 2 (2025–present)

Post-season history
- 2001 AFC Divisional: Steelers won: 27–10; 2008 AFC Championship: Steelers won: 23–14; 2010 AFC Divisional: Steelers won: 31–24; 2014 AFC Wild Card: Ravens won: 30–17; 2024 AFC Wild Card: Ravens won: 28–14

The Ravens–Steelers rivalry is a National Football League (NFL) rivalry between the Baltimore Ravens and Pittsburgh Steelers.

Both teams are members of the American Football Conference North (AFC North) division (formerly the AFC Central). Since the Ravens' inception in 1996, they have played at least twice a year, often for divisional supremacy. Both teams are known for fielding tough, hard-hitting defensive squads, giving their games an extra element of physical intensity. The Steelers and Ravens are the sole teams in the AFC North that have claimed Super Bowl victories. The Steelers boast six Super Bowl championships, while the Ravens have won two, with both teams achieving two titles since the inception of their rivalry. Despite the relatively recent inception of the rivalry in 1996, the Ravens–Steelers rivalry is widely considered one of the most iconic and fiercest rivalries in the NFL today.

The Steelers lead the overall series, 38–27. The two teams have met five times in the playoffs, with the Steelers holding a 3–2 record.

== Characteristics ==
"The coaches hate each other, the players hate each other... There's no calling each other after the game and inviting each other out to dinner. But the feeling's mutual: They don't like us, and we don't like them. There's no need to hide it, they know it, and we know it. It's going to be one of those black and blue games."

— Hines Ward, Steelers wide receiver

Steel Mill closures in the 1970's and 1980s brought many Pittsburgh residents to the Baltimore Area where Bethlehem Steel was still thriving at the time. In Baltimore, this rivalry has the added element of a small number of former Baltimore Colts fans in the area becoming Steelers fans after the Colts moved, then retaining their affiliation with the Steelers after the Ravens began play in Baltimore as a division rival of the Steelers. In Pittsburgh, it is considered the spiritual successor to the Browns–Steelers rivalry due to the Browns' relocation to Baltimore, as well as the "reactivated" Browns' poor record against the Steelers since returning to the league in 1999. Due to its physical nature, it has received comparisons to the Steelers' rivalry with the Oakland Raiders in the 1970s, when those two teams were among the most physical teams in the league. Both teams have also handed each other their first loss in their current stadiums; the Steelers handed the Ravens their first loss at PSINet Stadium (now M&T Bank Stadium) in 1998, while the Ravens returned the favor by handing the Steelers their first loss at Heinz Field (now Acrisure Stadium) in 2001.

Additionally, a notable battleground for the rivalry is the Harrisburg, Pennsylvania market area. Harrisburg is officially a secondary market for the Ravens, and so CBS affiliate WHP-TV must show all Ravens Sunday afternoon away games. The Steelers also have a significant fan base in the area, so when the Ravens are at home, the Steelers are shown instead. The Harrisburg area also has a significant fan base for the Philadelphia Eagles, who also have Harrisburg as a secondary market (but are in the NFC, so Fox affiliate WPMT usually shows the Eagles). The Colts also had many fans in Harrisburg during their stay in Baltimore.

In 2005, Sports Illustrated ranked the rivalry #2 on a list of "Top 10 New NFL Rivalries". By 2015, Bleacher Report had ranked it the #1 rivalry in all of the NFL. One of the rivalry's most memorable moments was Ravens linebacker Terrell Suggs being quoted as saying that a "bounty" was put out on the head of Steelers wide receiver Hines Ward. The bounty controversy was cleared up when Suggs insisted his words were just meant as a joke. The NFL investigated, and Suggs was cleared of any wrongdoing.

== History ==
=== 1990s and 2000s ===
In 1996, NFL football returned to Baltimore, 12 years after the original Baltimore Colts moved to Indianapolis. In a strange twist of fate, Art Modell, former owner of the Steelers' traditional rival, the Cleveland Browns, agreed to suspend the Browns franchise in return for taking his players and personnel to Baltimore, creating the Baltimore Ravens expansion franchise. The inter-divisional rivalry carried over with both teams remaining in what was then the AFC Central Division.

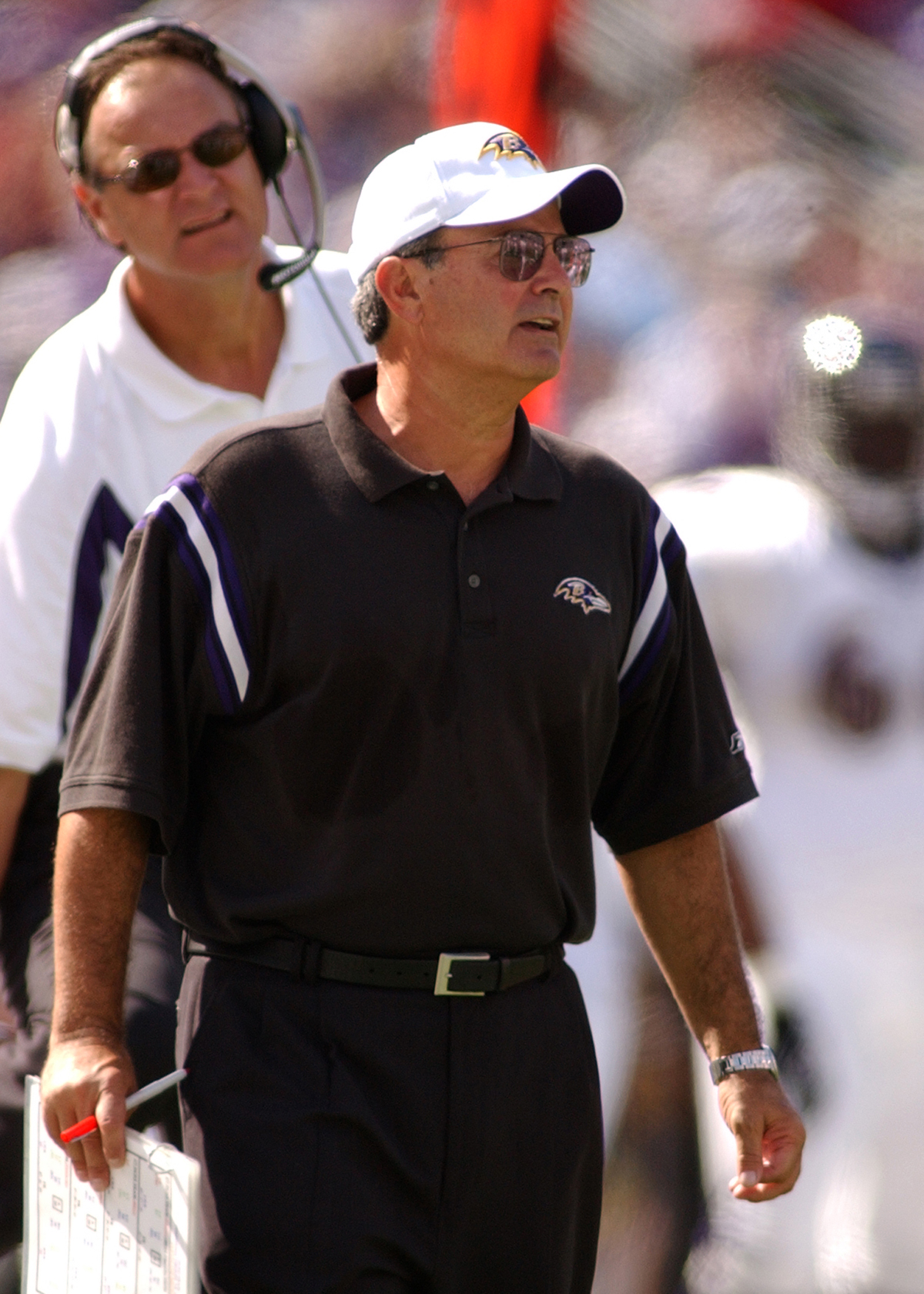
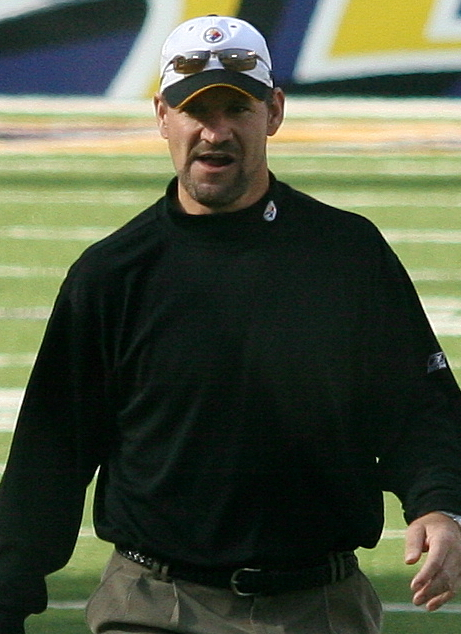
Ravens head coach Brian Billick (left) and Steelers head coach Bill Cowher (right) led their teams to Super Bowl victories during the early years of the rivalry.

The Ravens and Steelers first met on September 8, 1996, at Three Rivers Stadium in Pittsburgh, which resulted in a 31–17 win for the Steelers. Later in the 1996 NFL season, on December 1, the Ravens beat the Steelers 31–17 at Memorial Stadium in Baltimore. After splitting the games in their first season together, the Steelers would go on to mostly dominate the series in the early years, winning eight of eleven meetings (including a 2001 Divisional Playoff game) before the AFC Central was restructured into the AFC North in 2002. During this period, Ravens head coach Brian Billick would lead the team to their first championship in Super Bowl XXXV against the New York Giants. From 2002 to 2007, the rivals split their games 6–6, signaling a more competitive and fierce era for the rivalry. Steelers coach Bill Cowher would lead the team to a championship of his own, the team's fifth overall, in Super Bowl XL over the Seattle Seahawks. Cowher would eventually retire as Steelers head coach in 2007, and was succeeded by Mike Tomlin. The next year, Billick would be dismissed from his job and was replaced John Harbaugh.

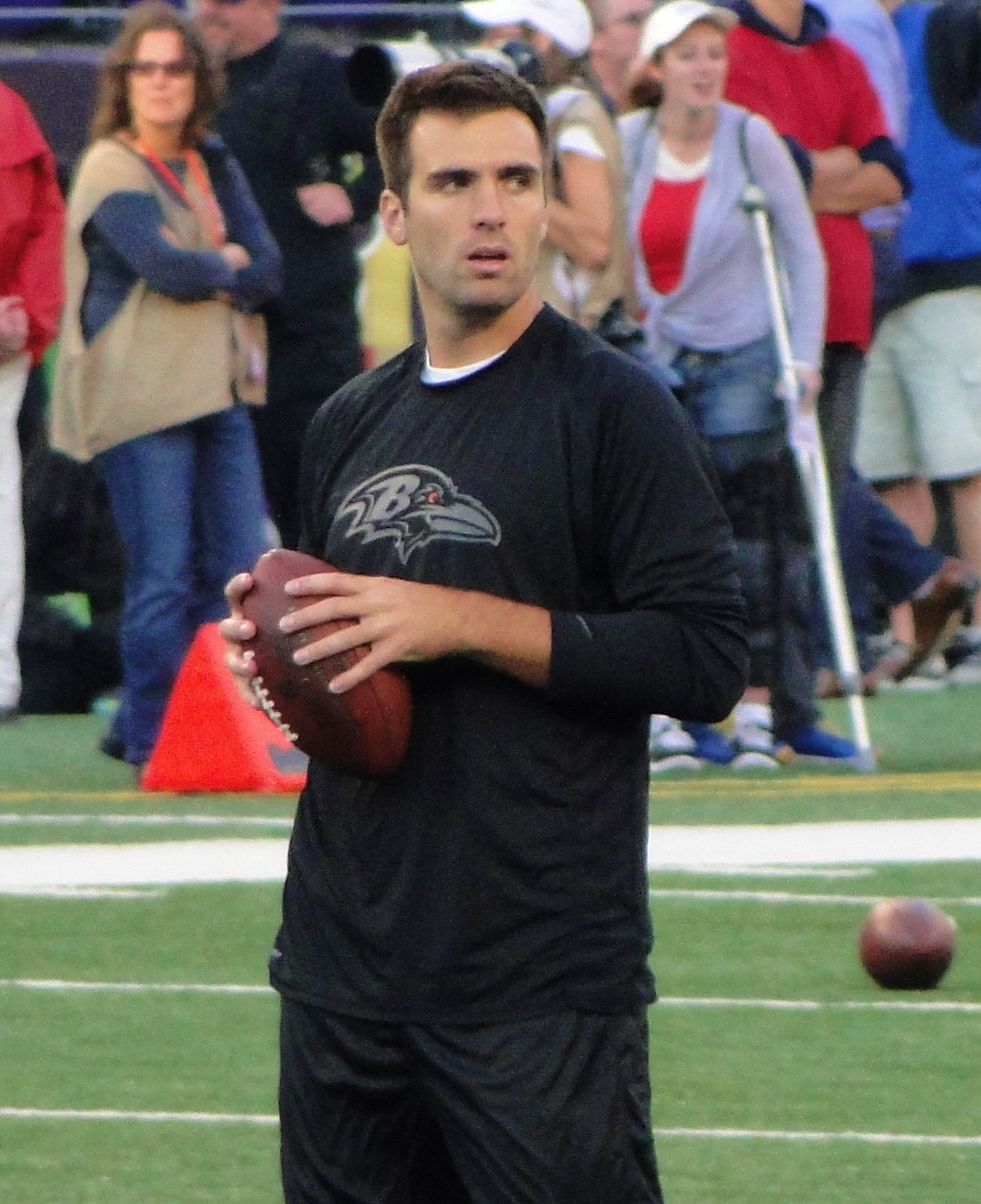
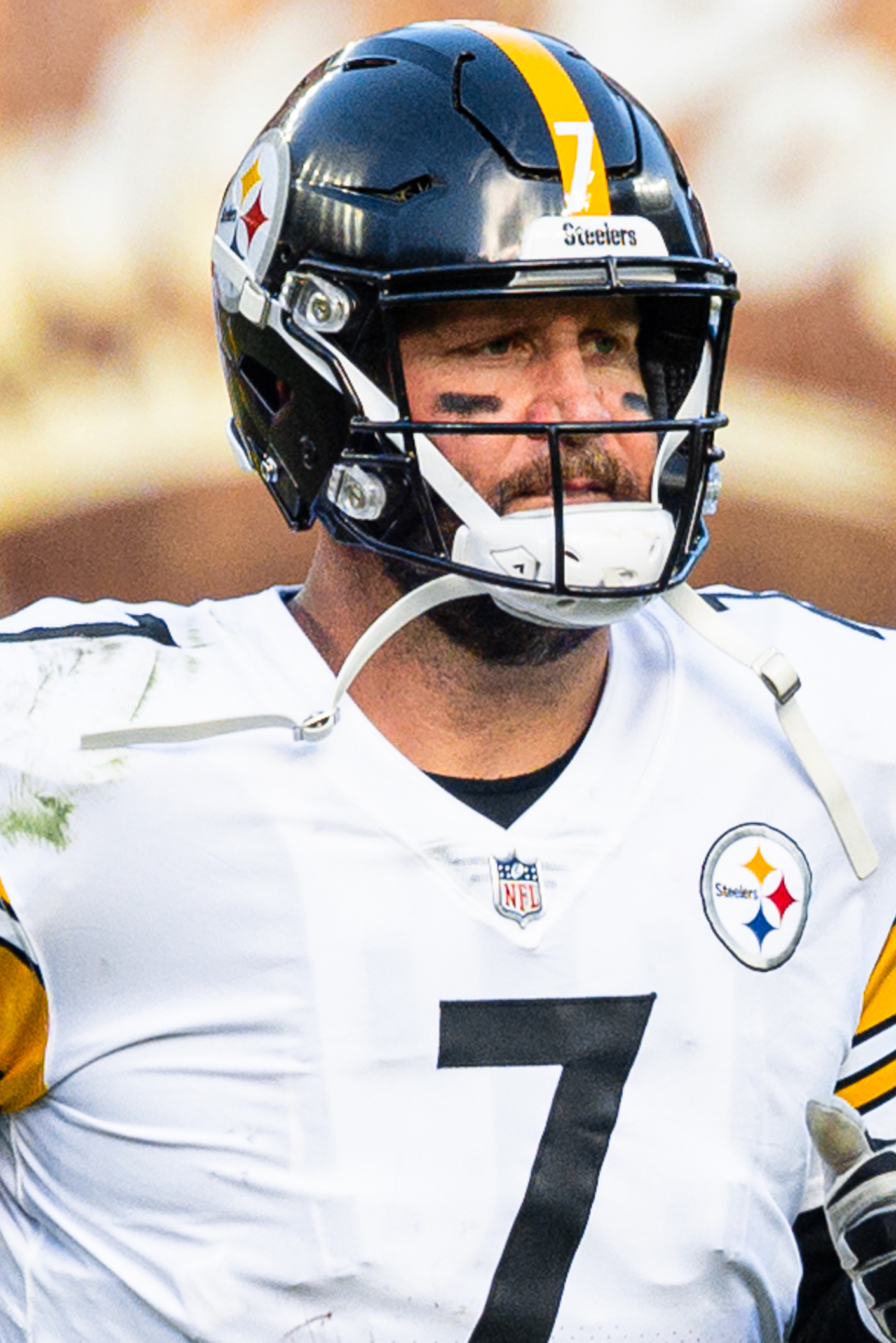
Joe Flacco and Ben Roethlisberger

The rivalry reached a new height of intensity during the 2008 NFL season, when the Ravens and Steelers played three times, the final match being the AFC Championship game. The Steelers won all three games by close margins. In Week 4 at Pittsburgh, the Steelers won on a 46–yard field goal in overtime. In Week 15 at Baltimore, the Steelers beat the Ravens with a controversial score late in the game. Also, as a result, the Steelers won the AFC North championship. In the playoff game, a personal foul by special teams player Daren Stone cost the Ravens 25 yards. The game's last score was an interception that was returned for a touchdown by Troy Polamalu, sealing a 23–14 victory for Pittsburgh. In that same game the Steelers' Ryan Clark delivered a concussion-inducing, but legal hit on the Ravens' Willis McGahee that left Clark briefly out cold and forced McGahee to spend the night in a Pittsburgh hospital. The Steelers went on to win Super Bowl XLIII against the Arizona Cardinals.

The bitter rivalry continued in the 2009 NFL season; the Ravens won 20–17 at M&T Bank Stadium and the Steelers won 23–20 at Heinz Field. Both the Ravens and the Steelers finished the season with 9–7 records, but Baltimore won a Wild Card slot over Pittsburgh due to a better division record.

=== 2010s ===
The Ravens and Steelers met three times again in 2010. During his press conference before the first game, Tomlin would call the rivalry the best in the NFL, to which Harbaugh agreed. The Ravens would win the first game and the Steelers won the last two, including the Divisional Playoff game. The Steelers would reach Super Bowl XLV, but lost to the Green Bay Packers.

On the opening Sunday of the 2011 NFL season, the Ravens forced seven turnovers and routed the Steelers 35–7 at home. During Week 9 of the season, the Steelers were on the verge of winning the rematch at Heinz Field. The Steelers were ready to potentially increase their lead with a 47–yard field goal kick by Shaun Suisham, but a 5–yard delay of game penalty put them out of field goal range and they instead decided to punt the ball to the Ravens. In the end, Ravens quarterback Joe Flacco threw a 26–yard touchdown pass to wide receiver Torrey Smith in the end zone with just eight seconds remaining, giving the Ravens the win and a season sweep of the Steelers. This would mark the last time Ravens linebacker Ray Lewis would play against the Steelers, as he was injured during the teams' two meetings in 2012 and retired following his win in Super Bowl XLVII.

In the 2012 season, the Ravens and Steelers split their games; the road team won each meeting. The Ravens won their second consecutive AFC North title and won Super Bowl XLVII against the San Francisco 49ers.

On Thanksgiving 2013, the Ravens defeated the Steelers 22–20, preventing a last-minute 2–point conversion and forcing a split between the rivals for the season. The game included an infamous moment when Steelers head coach Mike Tomlin unintentionally stepped onto the field interfering with a Jacoby Jones kickoff return, eventually resulting in a $100,000 fine for Tomlin.

In Week 2 of the 2014 season, the Ravens beat the Steelers 26–6 at M&T Bank Stadium, which marked the first time since 2011 that the Steelers did not score a touchdown in a game. In Week 9, the Steelers defeated the Ravens 43–23 at Heinz Field. Both games were decided by 20 points, which is unusual for Ravens–Steelers games. Though the Steelers went on to win the AFC North with an 11–5 record, the 10–6 Ravens would earn their first playoff victory over their rival on January 3, 2015, with a 30–17 win at Heinz Field in the wild-card round, in the game Ravens linebacker Terrell Suggs (who had public comments against Steelers Quarterback Ben Roethliesberger years before) caught a game sealing interception with his legs.

In Week 9 of 2016, the 4–3 Steelers and 3–4 Ravens met at M&T Bank Stadium, each team having an opportunity to gain control of the AFC North. Behind a defense that shut out the Steelers for the first three quarters, the Ravens won 21–14, taking the lead in the division and evening the teams' records at 4–4. In the rematch at Heinz Field on Christmas Day, the 9–5 Steelers prevailed over the 8–6 Ravens in a back-and-forth game, 31–27. With nine seconds remaining, Steelers receiver Antonio Brown scored the game's final points by reaching over the goal line. The win secured the AFC North championship for Pittsburgh and eliminated Baltimore from playoff contention.

The tightest game in the rivalry was a 39–38 Steelers win in Week 14 of 2017. The Ravens erased Steelers leads of 14–0 and 17–7 to lead 38–29 in the fourth quarter but the Steelers scored ten points in the final four minutes. Roethlisberger had 506 passing yards in the game.

The teams split their 2018 meetings, both winning on the road. In Week 4, The teams met in Pittsburgh for a Sunday Night Football showdown. The Ravens jumped out to a 14–0 lead in the first quarter, but following a Pittsburgh field goal and then a fumble by Ravens running back Alex Collins near the Steelers' goal line, the Steelers gained momentum and tied the game 14–14 at halftime. However, in the second half, the Ravens pulled away by kicking four field goals and shutting out the Steelers' offense, making the final score 26–14 in favor of Baltimore. In the rematch in Week 9, the Steelers defeated the Ravens 23–16, which included Joe Flacco's final start as a Raven due to an injury and later being benched in favor of rookie quarterback Lamar Jackson. In the final week of the season, the 9–6 Ravens hosted the Cleveland Browns while the 8–6–1 Steelers hosted the Cincinnati Bengals. The Steelers needed a win and a Ravens loss to win their third consecutive division championship, while the Ravens simply needed a win to clinch the AFC North. While the Steelers were able to win, the Ravens topped the Browns 26–24, which gave Baltimore the AFC North title. Steelers players and fans stayed to watch the end of the Ravens game on the jumbotron at Heinz Field after the game. Steelers fans were actively cheering for the Browns (with whom the Steelers also share a rivalry). The Steelers employees had to take "AFC North Division Champions" shirts that were in boxes on the field off after the Ravens won.

The 2–2 Ravens met the 1–3 Steelers in Week 5 in Pittsburgh as both teams looked to assert their position in a three-team race for the AFC North, along with the 2–2 Cleveland Browns. This physical game, which was Jackson's first career start against the Steelers, included several injuries, including a hard hit from safety Earl Thomas on Rudolph in the third quarter, requiring the Steelers to replace him with third string quarterback Devlin Hodges. The game was close throughout and eventually went into overtime, where the Ravens won 26–23 after Ravens cornerback Marlon Humphrey forced Steelers wide receiver JuJu Smith-Schuster to fumble, setting up Baltimore's game-winning field goal. In the final week of the season, the Ravens, having already clinched the AFC's #1 seed, rested their starters for this game and won 28–10, sweeping the Steelers for the first time since 2015 and ending their hopes for a playoff spot while earning their second consecutive AFC North title with a franchise-best record of 14–2.

=== 2020s ===
On December 2, 2020, the Ravens traveled to Pittsburgh for a rare Wednesday game after their game, originally scheduled for Thanksgiving was postponed due to a COVID-19 outbreak among the Ravens. The Ravens were missing several starters, including Jackson. Leading 19–14 with under a minute remaining, Steelers running back Benny Snell was thought to have been short of the line to gain to set up 4th and inches. However, this was overturned and Pittsburgh was awarded a first down and could run out the clock on the Ravens, who were out of time outs. Combined with an earlier win in Baltimore, this marked the Steelers' first season sweep of the Ravens since 2017.

On October 3, 2021, the Ravens tied a record set by the 1974–1977 Steelers for most consecutive games (43) rushing over 100 yards as a team. The Ravens' streak dated back to the 2018 season. On December 5, the Steelers took the first matchup of the 2021 season with a 20–19 victory, in which Baltimore unsuccessfully attempted a 2-point conversion on a last-minute touchdown that would have given them the win. They completed the season sweep during the final week of the season on January 9, 2022, beating the Ravens in overtime with a field goal by Chris Boswell to stay alive in the playoff race, as Indianapolis had lost earlier that day. This win, combined with a win by the Raiders later that evening, not only eliminated the Ravens from playoff contention, but sent the Steelers to the playoffs in what would prove to be Roethlisberger's final NFL season, as he would announce his retirement on January 27, 2022.

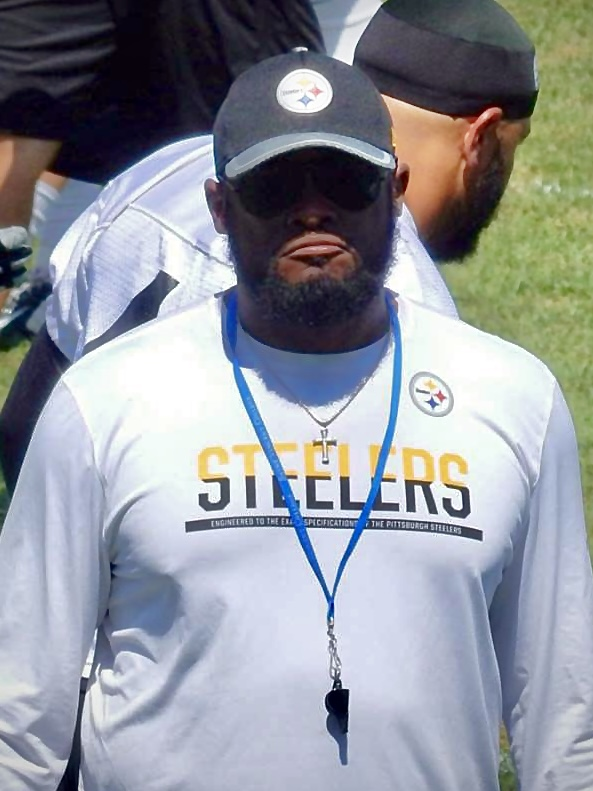
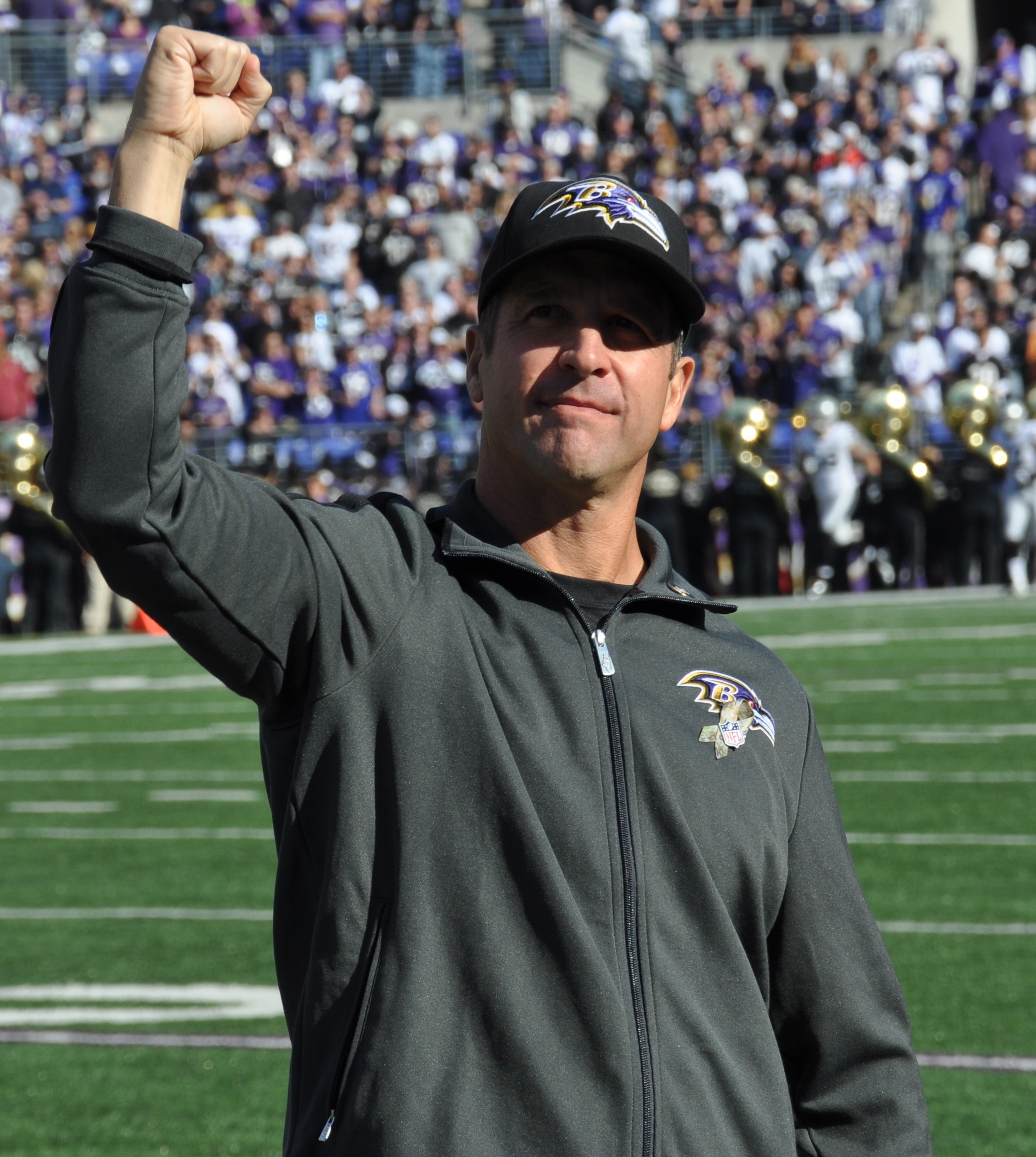
Mike Tomlin (left) and John Harbaugh (right) would face each other 40 times as head coaches of the Steelers and Ravens, respectively, the second-most between any two head coaches in NFL history.

December 11, 2022 marked the 32nd matchup between head coaches John Harbaugh of the Ravens and Mike Tomlin of the Steelers, surpassing Curly Lambeau and Steve Owen for the second-most head-to-head matchups between two head coaches in NFL history (the current record is held by Lambeau and George Halas with 49). Kenny Pickett made his first start against the Ravens in Pittsburgh, however it would be short lived, as he would sustain a hit from Ravens linebacker Roquan Smith during the Steelers opening drive, forcing him to leave the game. In relief, Mitch Trubisky would come out in relief but throw 3 interceptions in a 16–14 loss that would also see Ravens backup Quarterback Tyler Huntley who was already starting in relief of Lamar Jackson go down as well, forcing Baltimore to start Anthony Brown. On January 1, 2023, in Baltimore, Pickett would make his second start, throwing for 168 yards and 1 touchdown in a close 16–13 win.

They met in the 2024–25 NFL playoffs for the first time since 2014. This time, it was played at M&T Bank Stadium, home of the Ravens. The Ravens won 28–14 to eliminate the Steelers. Ravens tailback Derrick Henry was the primary force, recording 186 yards and two touchdowns, while quarterback Lamar Jackson added 82 rushing yards and two passing touchdowns despite being without top receiver Zay Flowers.

The 2025 season saw Pittsburgh led by quarterback Aaron Rodgers defeat the Ravens in Baltimore midway through the year. The teams met in Week 18, on Sunday Night Football in Pittsburgh for the AFC North title. Ravens kicker Tyler Loop missed a game winning and division clinching 44-yard field goal on the final play of the game. The Steelers won 26–24 and clinched the AFC North title for the first time since 2020. Two days later, the Ravens parted ways with longtime head coach John Harbaugh. A week later, after the Steelers lost the Wild Card round to the Houston Texans, Mike Tomlin would resign from his position as head coach.

Harbaugh and Tomlin were the league's two longest-tenured head coaches with their teams when they vacated their positions; Harbaugh had spent 18 years with the Ravens and Tomlin 19 years with the Steelers. The two head coaches faced each other a total of 40 times, with the Steelers having a 21–15 edge in the regular season but the teams 2–2 in the playoffs during this era. Tomlin would salute his rival after the latter's dismissal, saying "I just have so much respect for [Harbaugh]. Our stories will forever be interwoven, this rivalry we've been fortunate and honored to be a part of, I just got so much respect for him and how he's gone about his business. We've certainly had some legendary battles over the years."

== Season-by-season results ==
Baltimore Ravens vs. Pittsburgh Steelers Season-by-Season Results
1990s (Steelers, 6–2)

| Season | Season series | at Baltimore Ravens | at Pittsburgh Steelers | Overall series | Notes |
|---|---|---|---|---|---|
| 1996 | Tie 1–1 | Ravens; 31–17 | Steelers; 31–17 | Tie; 1–1 | Ravens’ inaugural season. |
| 1997 | Steelers 2–0 | Steelers; 42–34 | Steelers; 37–0 | Steelers; 3–1 | In Baltimore, Steelers overcame a 21–0 deficit. The 21-point comeback tied a Steelers franchise record for largest comeback, while the 21-point blown lead marked the largest in Ravens franchise history. In Pittsburgh, Steelers record their largest victory against the Ravens with a 37–point differential. |
| 1998 | Steelers 2–0 | Steelers; 20–13 | Steelers; 16–6 | Steelers; 5–1 | Ravens open Ravens Stadium at Camden Yards (now known as M&T Bank Stadium). |
| 1999 | Tie 1–1 | Steelers; 23–20 | Ravens; 31–24 | Steelers; 6–2 | In Pittsburgh, Ravens WR' Qadry Ismail scored three touchdowns with 258 receiving yards, setting a record at Three Rivers Stadium. |

2000s (Steelers, 13–9)

| Season | Season series | at Baltimore Ravens | at Pittsburgh Steelers | Overall series | Notes |
|---|---|---|---|---|---|
| 2000 | Tie 1–1 | Steelers; 9–6 | Ravens; 16–0 | Steelers; 7–3 | Steelers' win was the Ravens last loss of the 2000 season, as they went on a 13-game winning streak that extended into the following season. Ravens win Super Bowl XXXV. |
| 2001 | Tie 1–1 | Steelers; 26–21 | Ravens; 13–10 | Steelers; 8–4 | Steelers open Heinz Field (now known as Acrisure Stadium). |
| 2001 Playoffs | Steelers 1–0 | | Steelers; 27–10 | Steelers; 9–4 | First postseason meeting. AFC Divisional Round. |
| 2002 | Steelers 2–0 | Steelers; 31–18 | Steelers; 34–31 | Steelers; 11–4 | |
| 2003 | Tie 1–1 | Ravens; 13–10 (OT) | Steelers; 34–15 | Steelers; 12–5 | |
| 2004 | Tie 1–1 | Ravens; 30–13 | Steelers; 20–7 | Steelers; 13–6 | In Baltimore, following an injury to Steelers' QB Tommy Maddox, QB Ben Roethlisberger took over for the rest of the game and the remainder of the season. Ravens' win was the Steelers' only regular season loss in the 2004 season, as they went on a 15-game winning streak. |
| 2005 | Tie 1–1 | Ravens; 16–13 (OT) | Steelers; 20–19 | Steelers; 14–7 | Steelers win Super Bowl XL. |
| 2006 | Ravens 2–0 | Ravens; 27–0 | Ravens; 31–7 | Steelers; 14–9 | Ravens record their first season series sweep against the Steelers. |
| 2007 | Tie 1–1 | Ravens; 27–21 | Steelers; 38–7 | Steelers; 15–10 | Steelers hire Mike Tomlin as head coach. Ravens' win ended their 9-game losing streak, setting a franchise record for longest losing streak. |
| 2008 | Steelers 2–0 | Steelers; 13–9 | Steelers; 23–20 (OT) | Steelers; 17–10 | Ravens draft QB Joe Flacco and hire John Harbaugh as head coach. In Baltimore, Steelers clinch the AFC North with their win. |
| 2008 Playoffs | Steelers 1–0 | | Steelers; 23–14 | Steelers; 18–10 | AFC Championship Game. Steelers go on to win Super Bowl XLIII. |
| 2009 | Tie 1–1 | Ravens; 20–17 (OT) | Steelers; 23–20 | Steelers; 19–11 | Both teams finished with 9–7 records, but the Ravens clinched the final playoff berth based on a better division record, eliminating the Steelers from playoff contention. |

2010s (Ravens, 13–9)

| Season | Season series | at Baltimore Ravens | at Pittsburgh Steelers | Overall series | Notes |
|---|---|---|---|---|---|
| 2010 | Tie 1–1 | Steelers; 13–10 | Ravens; 17–14 | Steelers; 20–12 | Both teams finished with 12–4 records, but the Steelers clinched the AFC North based on a better division record. |
| 2010 Playoffs | Steelers 1–0 | —N/a | Steelers; 31–24 | Steelers; 21–12 | AFC Divisional Round. Steelers overcome a 21–7 second half deficit. Steelers go on to lose Super Bowl XLV. |
| 2011 | Ravens 2–0 | Ravens; 35–7 | Ravens; 23–20 | Steelers; 21–14 | In Baltimore, Ravens record their largest victory against the Steelers with a 28–point differential. Both teams finished with 12–4 records, but the Ravens clinched the AFC North based on their head-to-head sweep. |
| 2012 | Tie 1–1 | Steelers; 23–20 | Ravens; 13–10 | Steelers; 22–15 | Ravens' LB Ray Lewis and Steelers' QB Ben Roethlisberger miss both meetings due to injury. Steelers' win ended the Ravens 16-game home winning streak. Ravens win Super Bowl XLVII. |
| 2013 | Tie 1–1 | Ravens; 22–20 | Steelers; 19–16 | Steelers; 23–16 | Game in Baltimore was played on Thanksgiving. Steelers head coach Mike Tomlin infamously steps onto the field of play during the Ravens' kickoff return. |
| 2014 | Tie 1–1 | Ravens; 26–6 | Steelers; 43–23 | Steelers; 24–17 | In Pittsburgh, the Steelers scored their most points in a game against the Ravens, as QB Ben Roethlisberger threw for six touchdown passes. |
| 2014 Playoffs | Ravens 1–0 | —N/a | Ravens; 30–17 | Steelers; 24–18 | AFC Wild Card Round. Ravens record their first postseason win against the Steelers. |
| 2015 | Ravens 2–0 | Ravens; 20–17 | Ravens; 23–20 (OT) | Steelers; 24–20 | In Pittsburgh, Ravens overcame a 20–7 third quarter deficit. |
| 2016 | Tie 1–1 | Ravens; 21–14 | Steelers; 31–27 | Steelers; 25–21 | Game in Pittsburgh was played on Christmas Day. Steelers score a game-winning touchdown in the final seconds to clinch the AFC North and eliminate the Ravens from playoff contention. |
| 2017 | Steelers 2–0 | Steelers; 26–9 | Steelers; 39–38 | Steelers; 27–21 | In Pittsburgh, the Ravens score their most points in a game against the Steelers despite the loss. |
| 2018 | Tie 1–1 | Steelers; 23–16 | Ravens; 26–14 | Steelers; 28–22 | Ravens draft QB Lamar Jackson. Game in Baltimore was Joe Flacco's final game as a Raven, as he would get injured and eventually benched for rookie Lamar Jackson before being traded to the Denver Broncos in the offseason. |
| 2019 | Ravens 2–0 | Ravens; 28–10 | Ravens; 26–23 (OT) | Steelers; 28–24 | In Baltimore, Ravens eliminate the Steelers from playoff contention with their win. |

2020s (Steelers, 10–3)

| Season | Season series | at Baltimore Ravens | at Pittsburgh Steelers | Overall series | Notes |
|---|---|---|---|---|---|
| 2020 | Steelers 2–0 | Steelers; 28–24 | Steelers; 19–14 | Steelers; 30–24 | The game in Pittsburgh was originally to be played on Thanksgiving before being rescheduled to December 2 due to a COVID-19 outbreak among the Ravens. Steelers win their franchise-record eleventh straight game to start a season in that game. |
| 2021 | Steelers 2–0 | Steelers; 16–13 (OT) | Steelers; 20–19 | Steelers; 32–24 | In Baltimore, the Steelers clinch the final playoff berth and eliminate the Ravens from playoff contention with their win. The game was also the final regular season start and victory for Steelers' QB Ben Roethlisberger. |
| 2022 | Tie 1–1 | Steelers; 16–13 | Ravens; 16–14 | Steelers; 33–25 | |
| 2023 | Steelers 2–0 | Steelers; 17–10 | Steelers; 17–10 | Steelers; 35–25 | In Baltimore, the Steelers' win, combined with the Jaguars' loss to the Titans, allowed them to clinch the final playoff spot in the AFC. |
| 2024 | Tie 1–1 | Ravens; 34–17 | Steelers; 18–16 | Steelers; 36–26 | Ravens' win clinched them a playoff berth and denied the Steelers the AFC North crown. The Ravens would go on to win the division after wins in their final two games and the Steelers' loss in their final two games. |
| 2024 Playoffs | Ravens 1–0 | Ravens; 28–14 | —N/a | Steelers; 36–27 | AFC Wild Card Round. |
| 2025 | Steelers 2–0 | Steelers; 27–22 | Steelers; 26–24 | Steelers; 38–27 | In Pittsburgh, Ravens kicker Tyler Loop missed a potential game-winning 44-yard field goal on the final play, which allowed the Steelers to clinch the AFC North title and eliminate the Ravens from playoff contention. The game also marked John Harbaugh’s final game as the Ravens’ head coach. Mike Tomlin would also leave the Steelers after the playoffs. |
| 2026 | | January 9/10 | December 20 | Steelers; 38–27 | |

Summary of Results

| Season | Season series | at Baltimore Ravens | at Pittsburgh Steelers | Notes |
|---|---|---|---|---|
| Regular season | Steelers 35–25 | Steelers 16–14 | Steelers 19–11 | |
| Postseason | Steelers 3–2 | Ravens 1–0 | Steelers 3–1 | AFC Wild Card: 2014, 2024; AFC Divisional: 2001, 2010; AFC Championship: 2008 |
| Regular and postseason | Steelers 38–27 | Steelers 16–15 | Steelers 22–12 | |

== Gallery ==
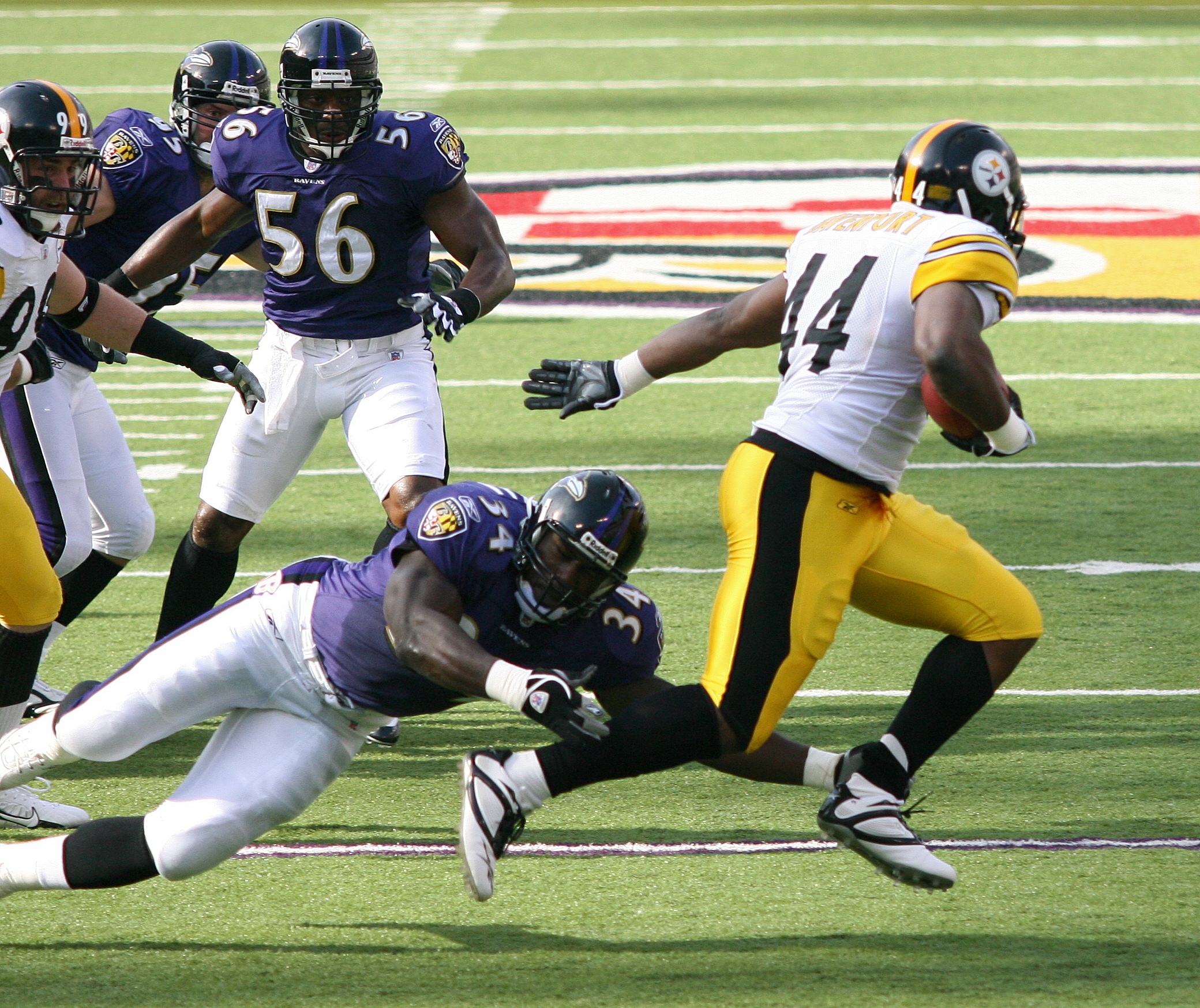
Najeh Davenport tries to escape from the Ravens defense, 2006.

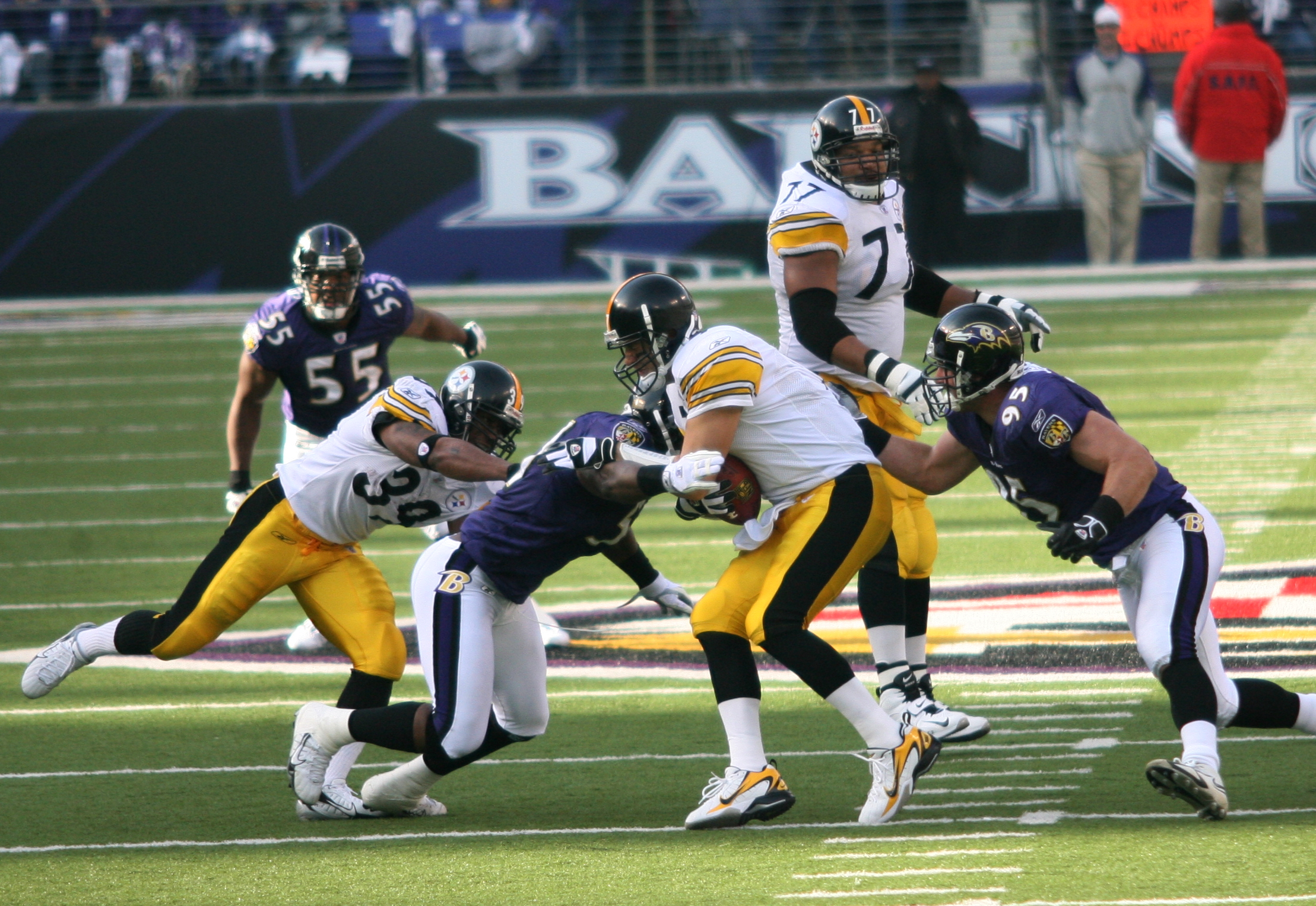
Ben Roethlisberger getting sacked by the Ravens, 2006.

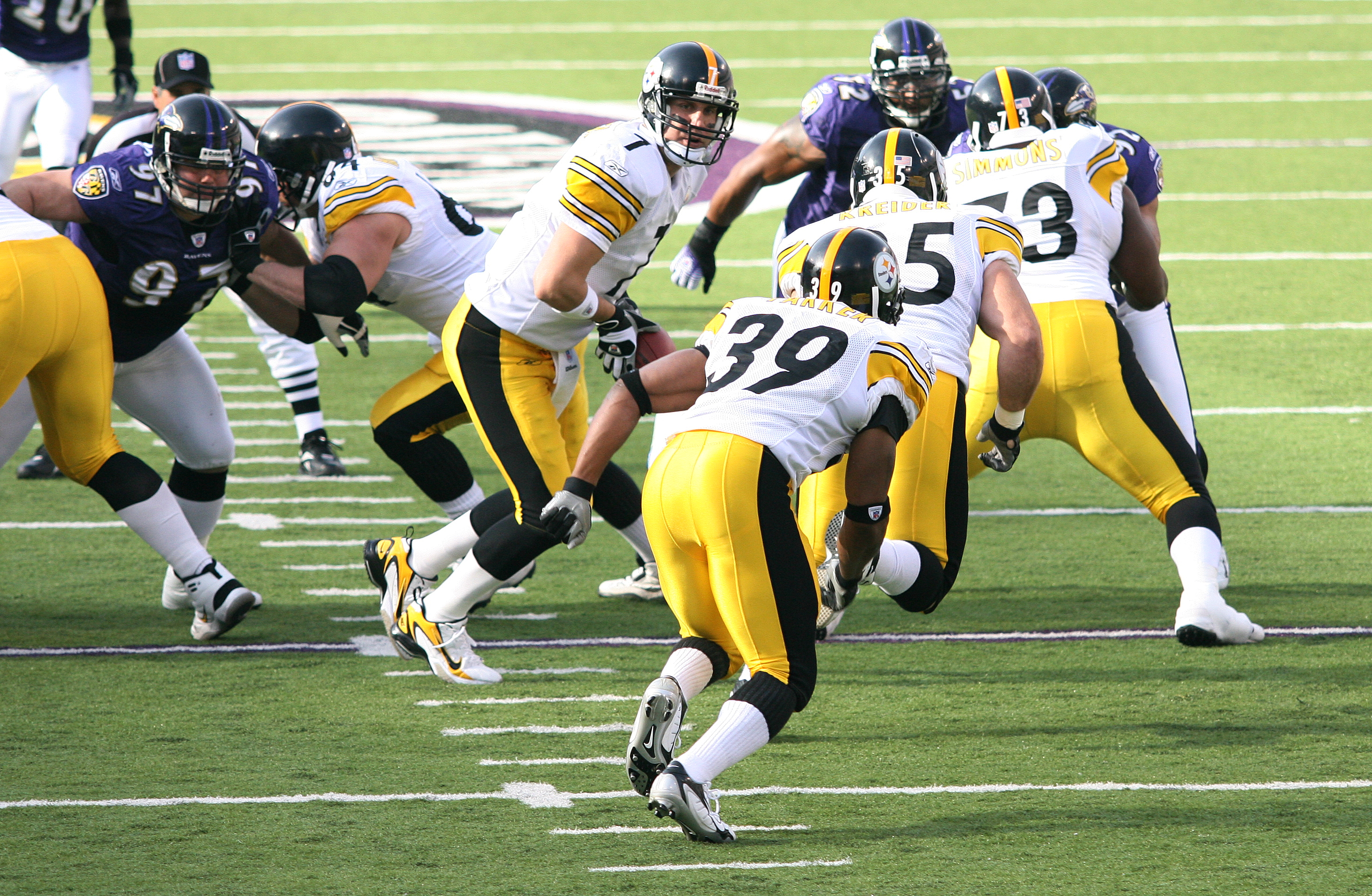
Roethlisberger hands off to Willie Parker, 2006.

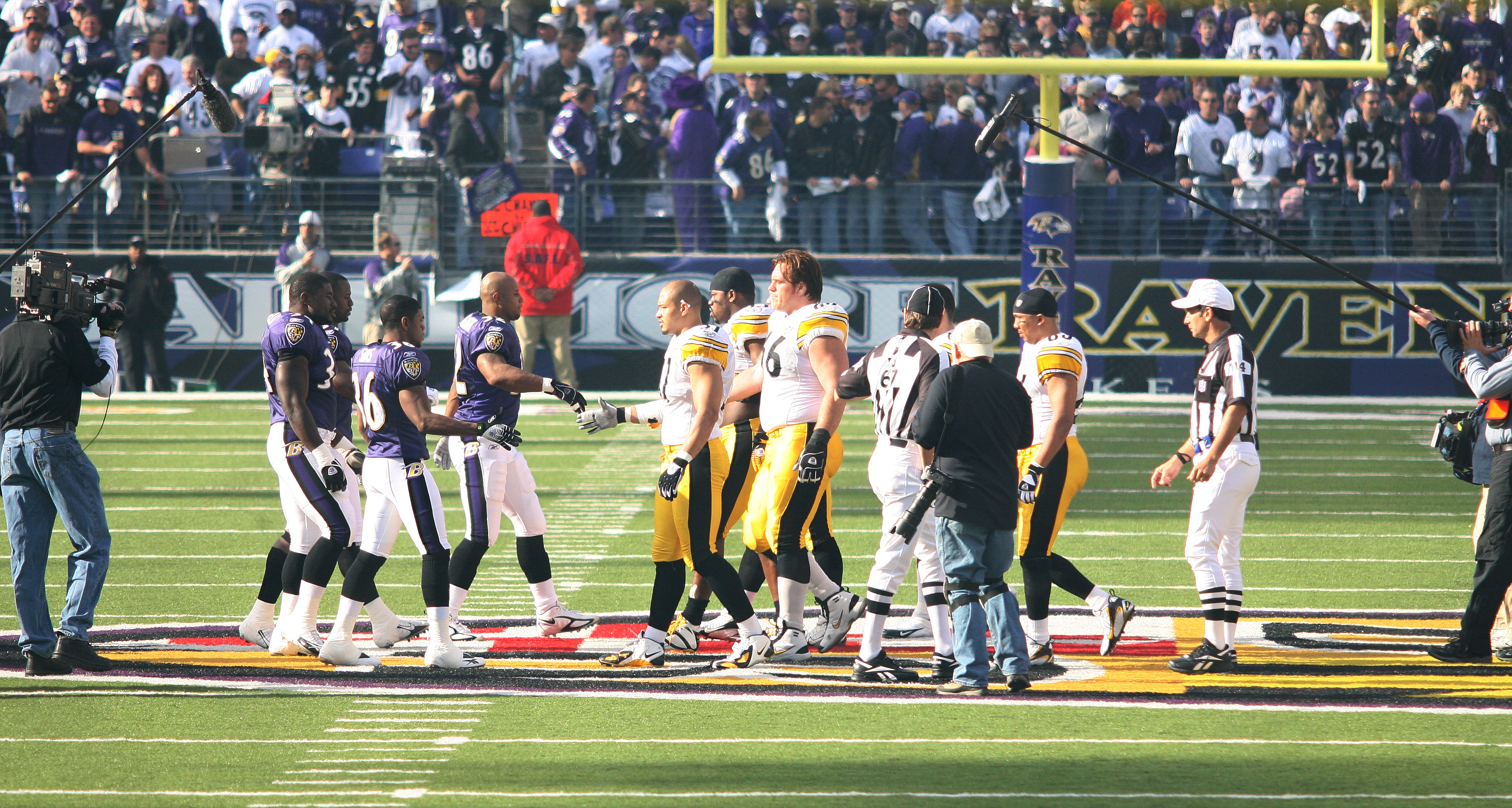
Captains from both teams meet for the coin toss, 2006

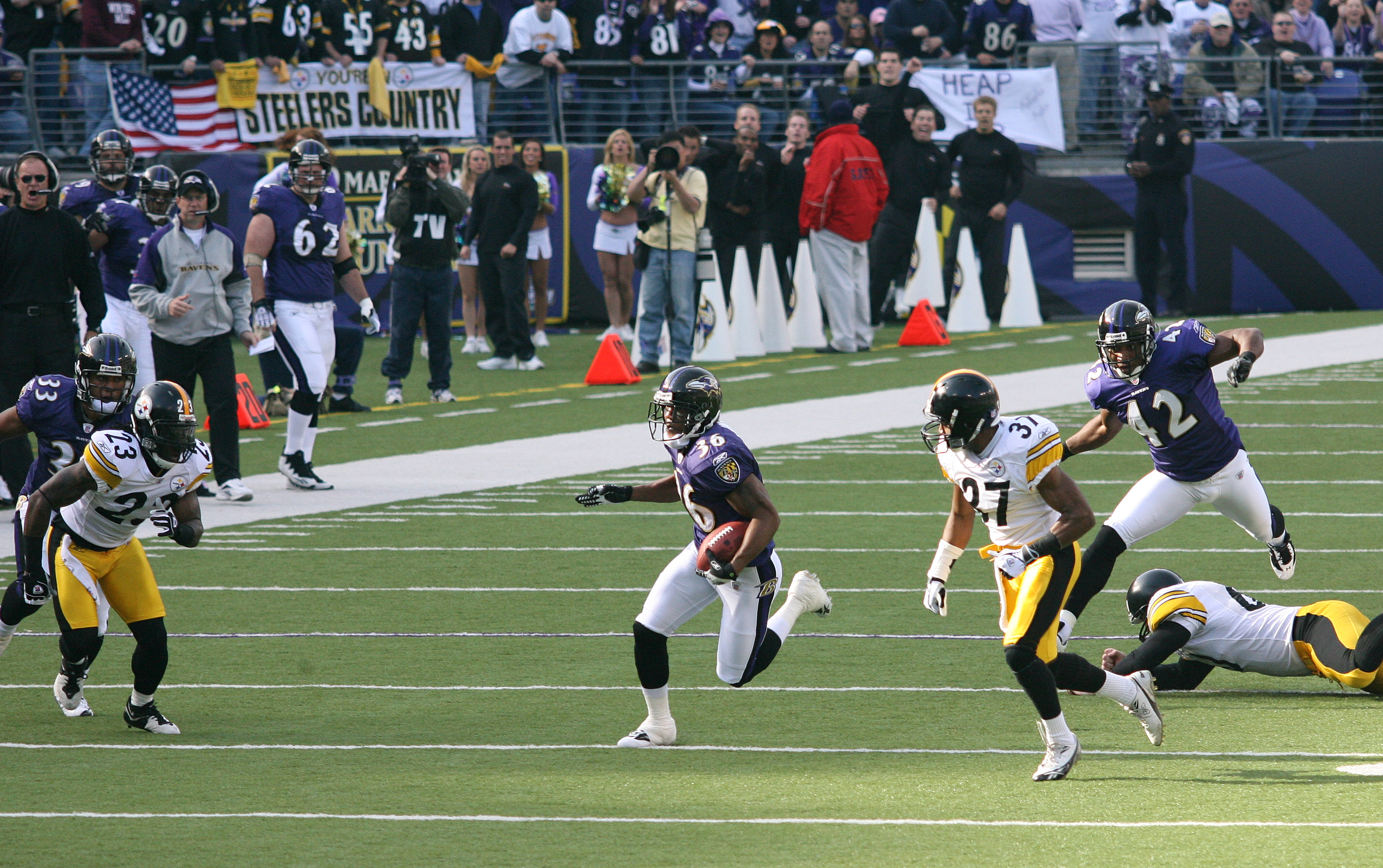
Tyrone Carter (23) and Anthony Madison (37) prepare to tackle B. J. Sams, 2006.

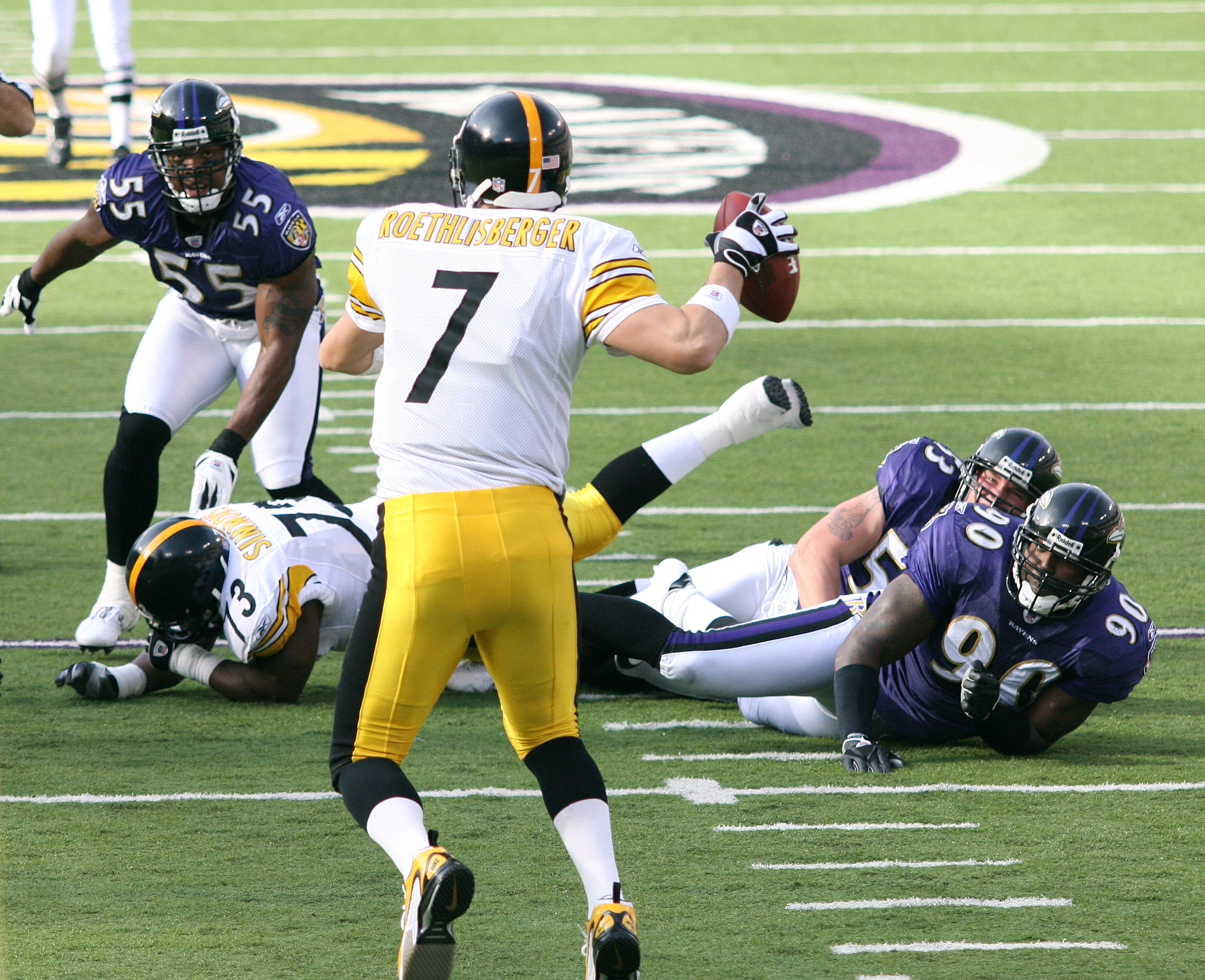
Ben Roethlisberger, Trevor Pryce (90), and Terrell Suggs (55) in 2006.

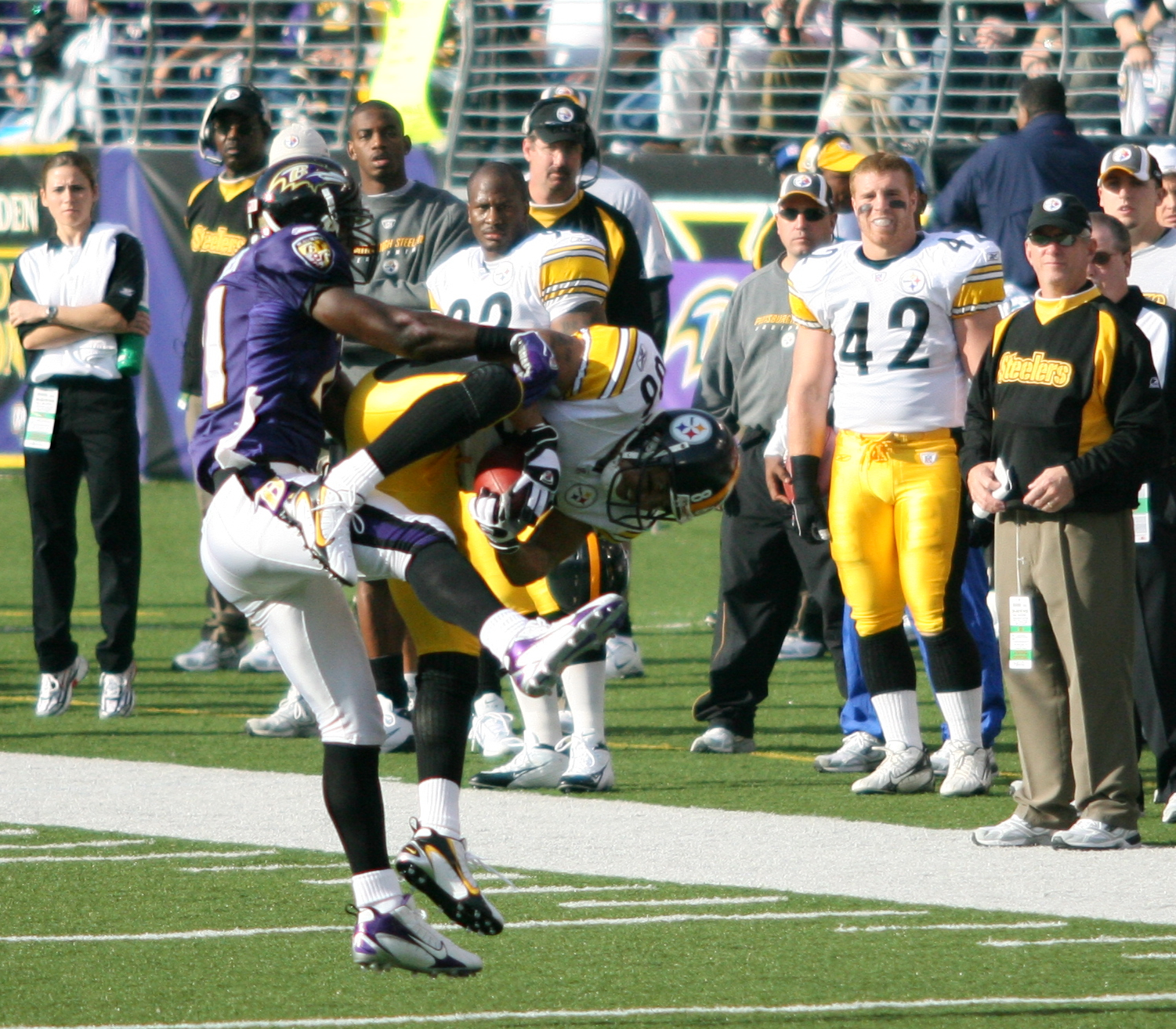
Hines Ward makes a catch for the Steelers, 2006.

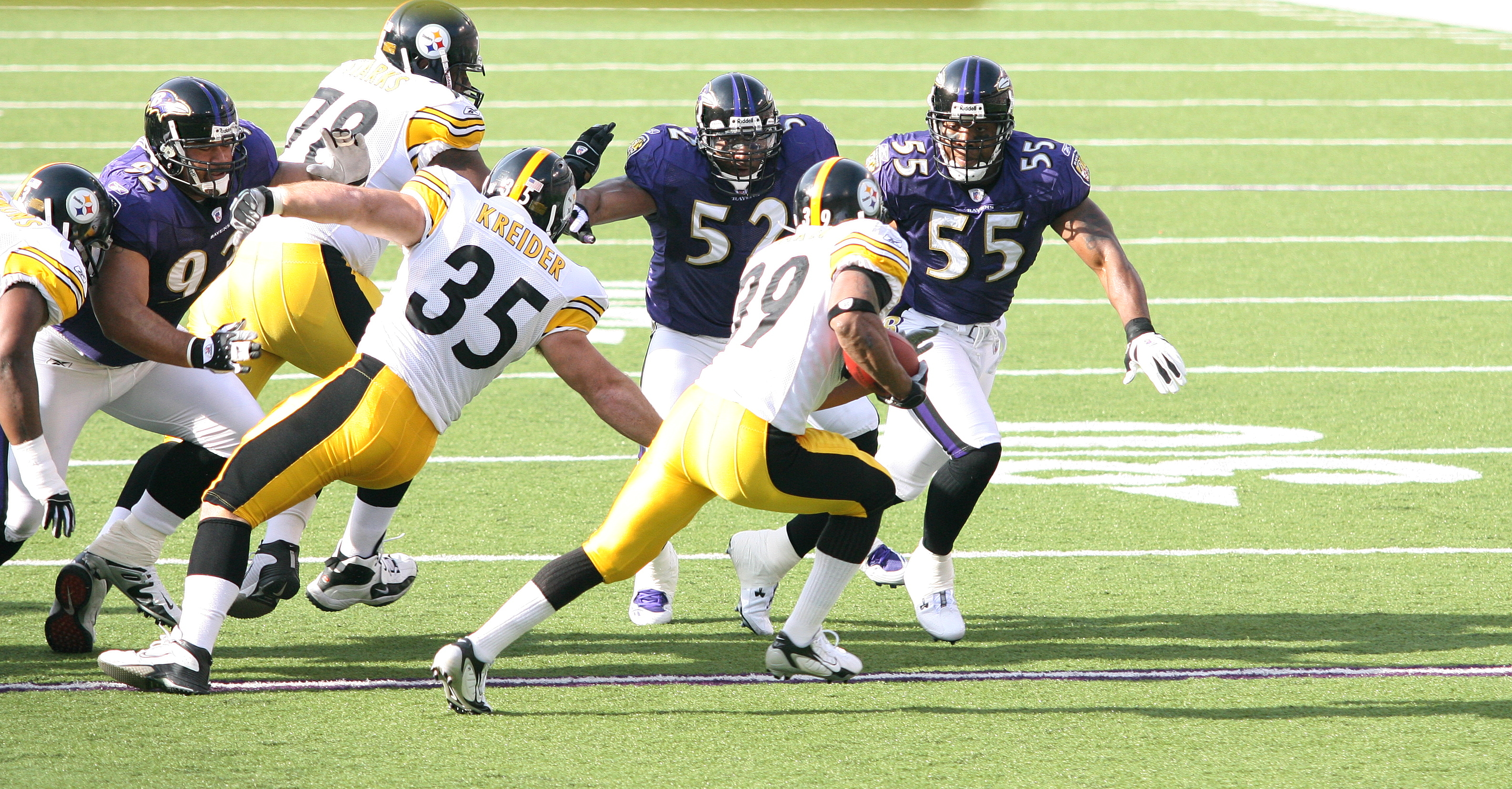
Parker running against Ravens players (left to right) Haloti Ngata, Ray Lewis, and Terrell Suggs, 2006.

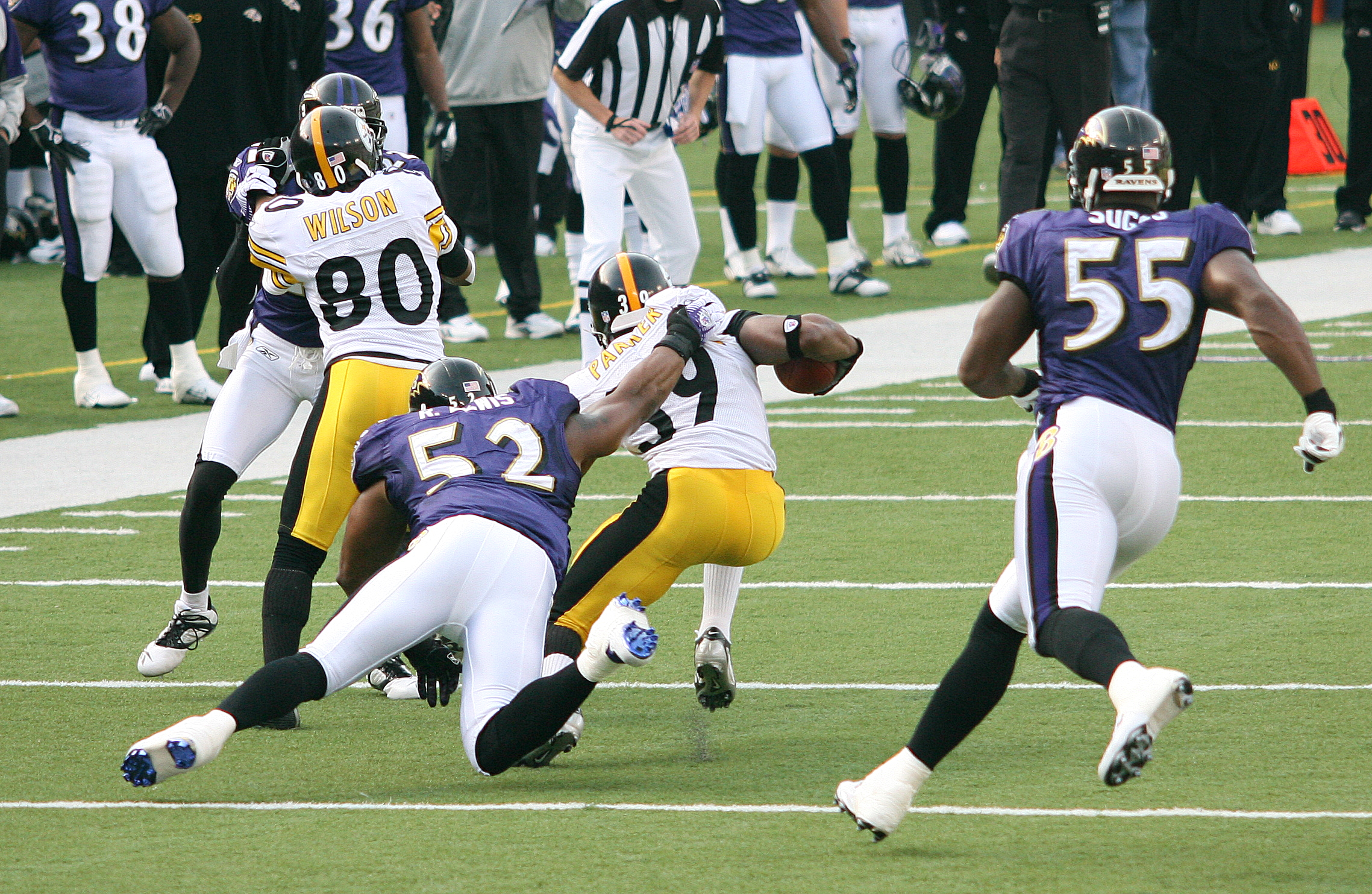
Ray Lewis (52) and Terrell Suggs (55) of the Ravens chase down Steelers Willie Parker, 2006.

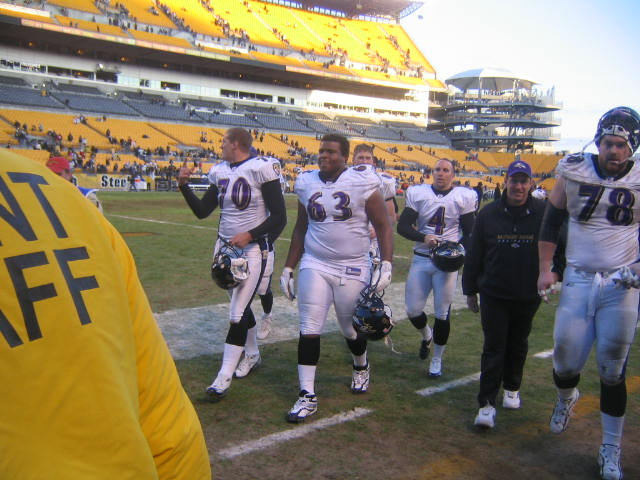
The Ravens walking off the field after beating the Steelers, 2006.

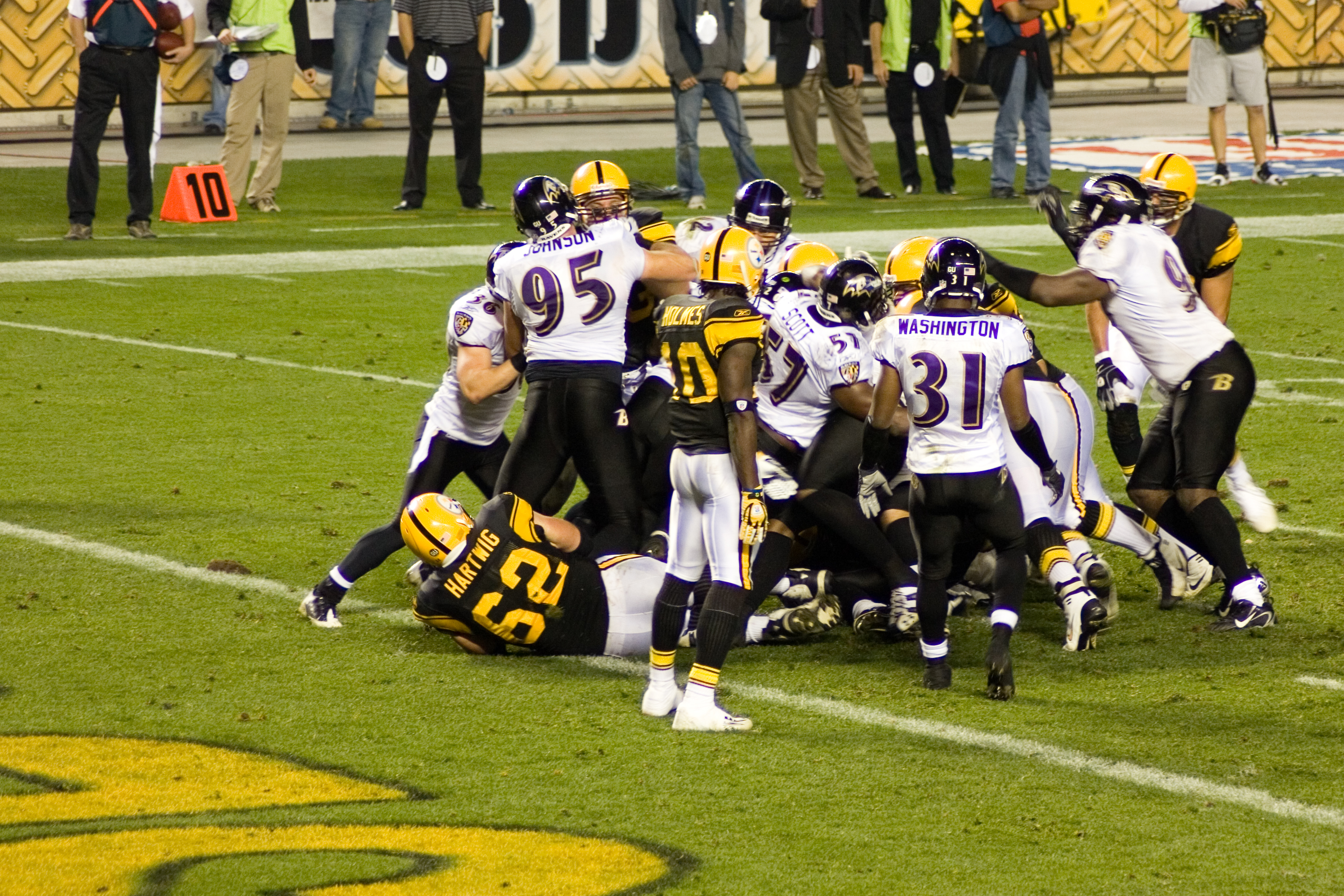
A game in 2008. For the Ravens, CB Fabian Washington is #31, and OLB/DE Jarret Johnson is #95. For the Steelers, WR Santonio Holmes is #10.

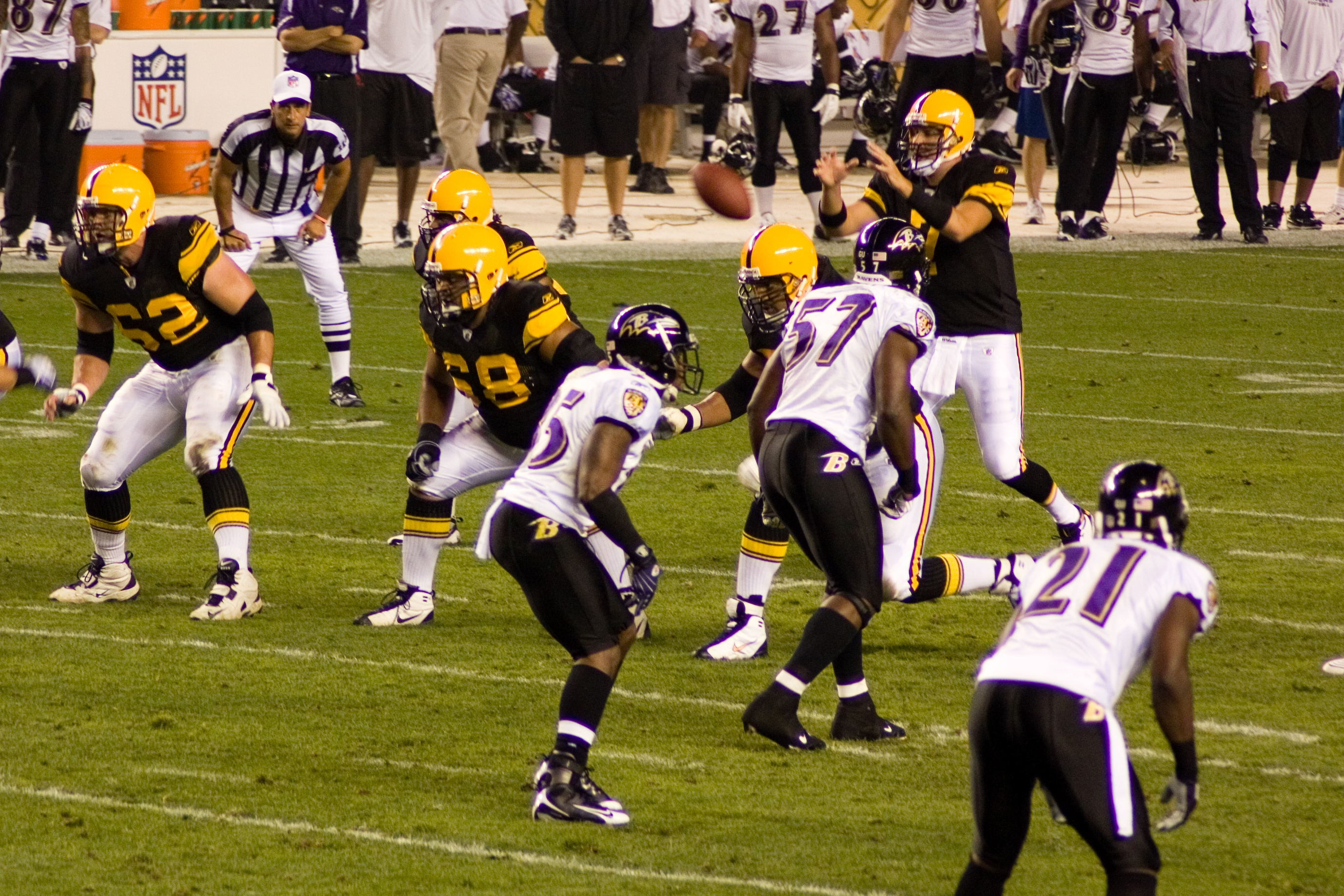
A game in 2008. Visible for the Ravens are CB Corey Ivy (35), LB Bart Scott (57), and CB Chris McAlister (21). Ben Roethlisberger takes the snap.

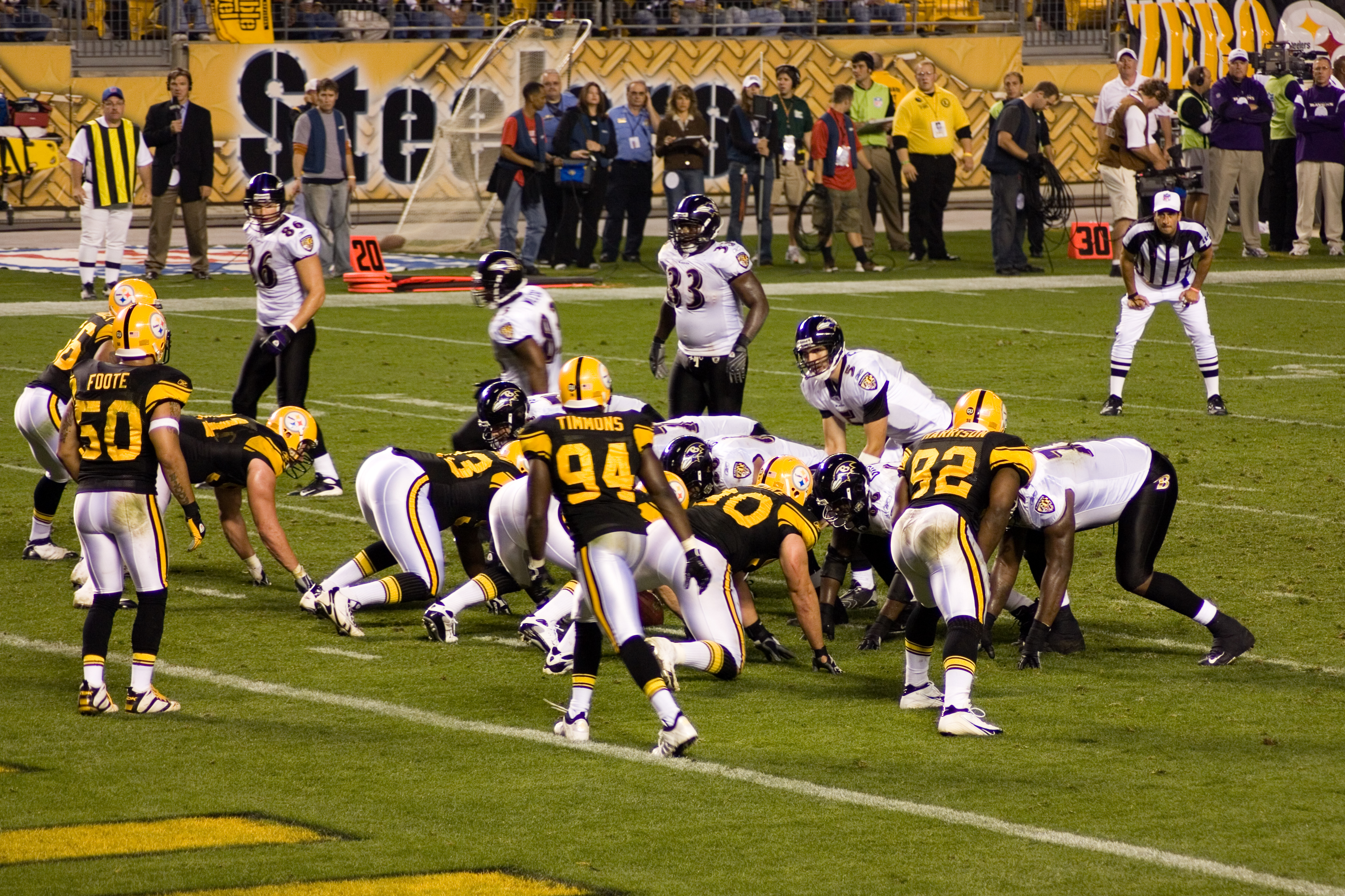
A game in 2008. Visible for the Steelers are LB Larry Foote (50), LB Lawrence Timmons (94), and DE/LB James Harrison (92). For the Ravens, TE #86 Todd Heap, FB #33 LeRon McClain, and QB #5 Joe Flacco can be seen.

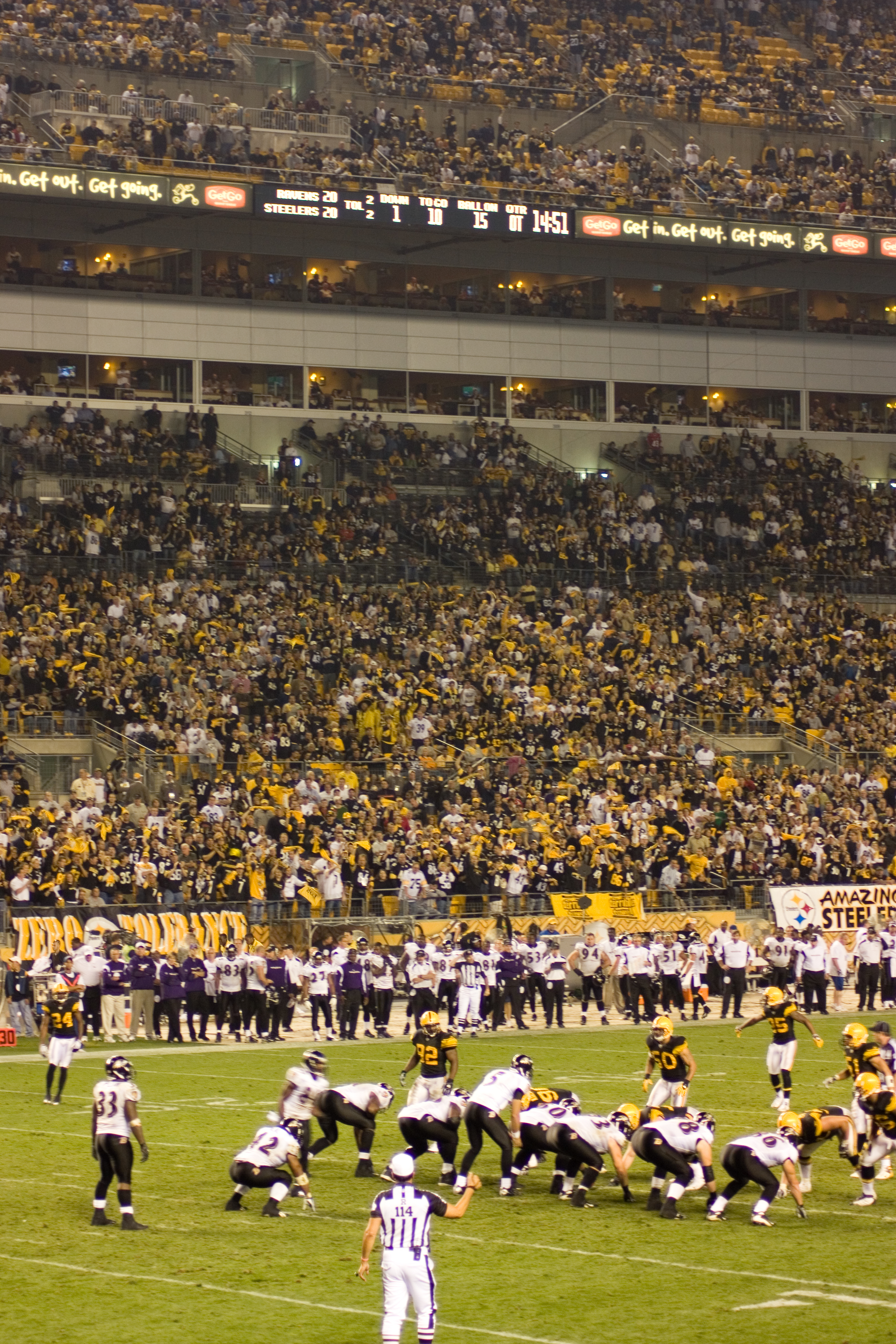
A view of Heinz Field during a September, 2008 game.

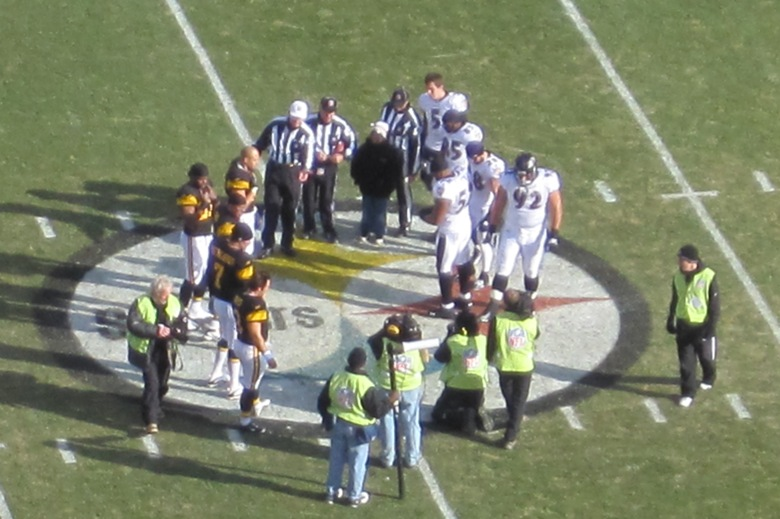
A coin toss in 2009.

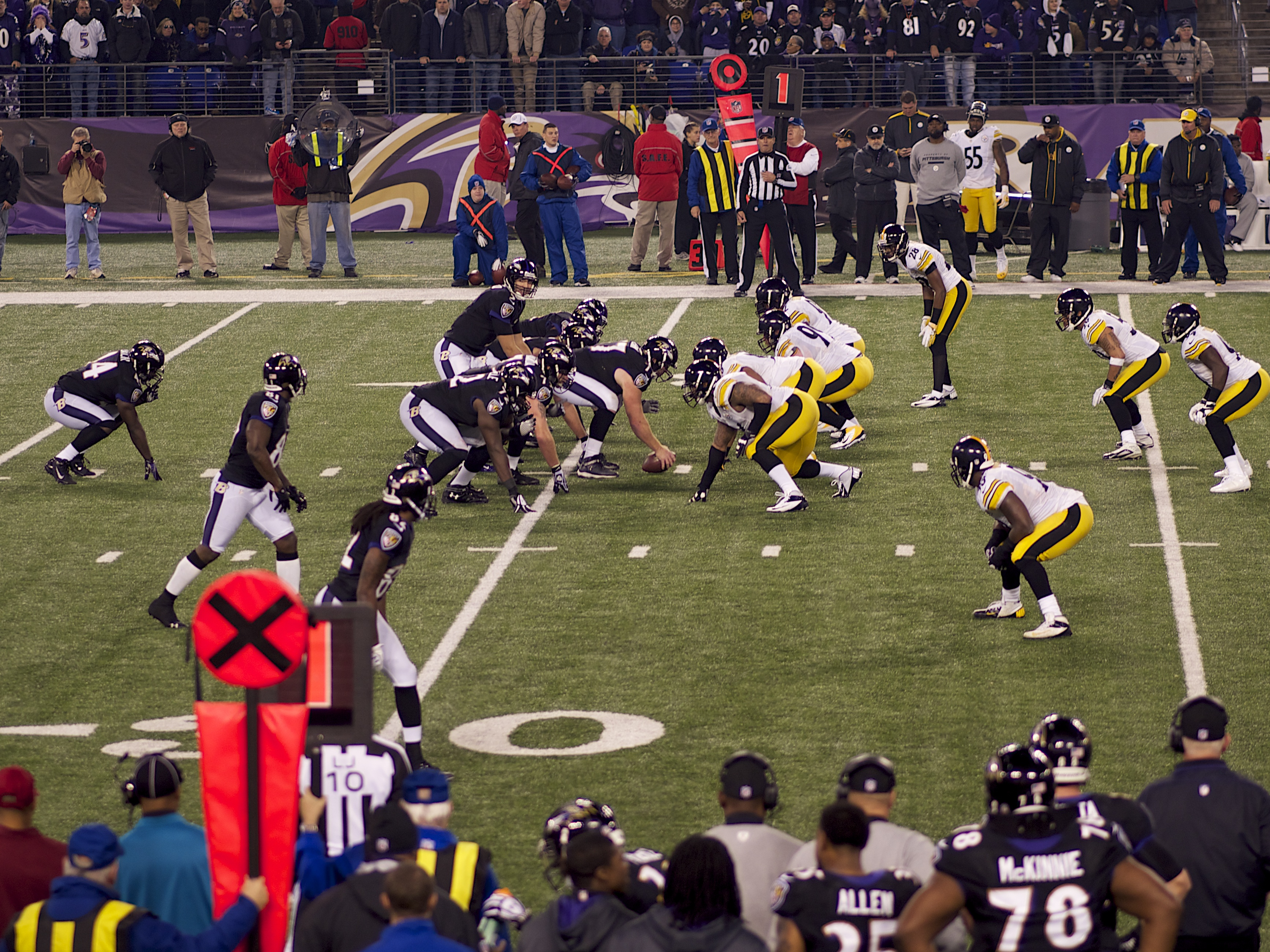
A game at M&T Bank Stadium in 2012.

== See also ==
- List of NFL rivalries
- AFC North
