= 1975 AFC Championship Game =

National Football League playoff game

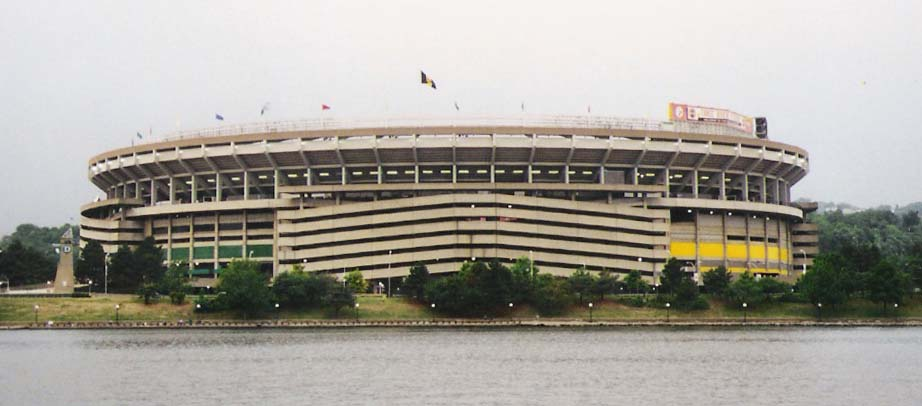
- The game was played at Three Rivers Stadium in Pittsburgh, Pennsylvania
Oakland Raiders (2) (11–3)	Pittsburgh Steelers (1) (12–2)
10	16
Head coach: John Madden	Head coach: Chuck Noll
	1	2	3	4	Total
OAK	0	0	0	10	10
PIT	0	3	0	13	16
- Date: January 4, 1976
- Stadium: Three Rivers Stadium; Pittsburgh, Pennsylvania
- Referee: Ben Dreith
- Attendance: 50,609

TV in the United States
- Network: NBC
- Announcers: Curt Gowdy, Al DeRogatis and Don Meredith

The 1975 AFC Championship Game was the sixth title game (Note: In this series of articles, title game refers to pre-merger AFL and NFL Championship Games up to and including the 1969 season as well as post-merger AFC and NFC Championship Games from the 1970 season onward.) of the American Football Conference (AFC). Played on January 4, 1976, the game was hosted by the AFC Central champion and defending AFC and Super Bowl champion Pittsburgh Steelers who, in a rematch of the 1974 title game, played the AFC West champion Oakland Raiders at Three Rivers Stadium in Pittsburgh, Pennsylvania. Along with the 1975 NFC Championship Game played on the same day, this game constituted the penultimate round of the 1975–76 NFL playoffs which had followed the 1975 regular season of the National Football League (NFL).

Pittsburgh defeated Oakland 16–10 to repeat as AFC champions and earn the right to represent the conference in Super Bowl X.

== Background ==
This was the third AFC Championship Game contested by the Steelers in the past four seasons, and also their third title game overall. Pittsburgh won the AFC Central with a 12–2 regular season record and defeated the AFC East champion Baltimore Colts 28–10 at Three Rivers Stadium in the Divisional Round to advance to the AFC Championship game.

This was the third consecutive AFC Championship Game title game contested by the Raiders, and also their fourth AFC Championship Game and seventh title game in the Super Bowl era. (Note: Oakland had won the 1967 American Football League Championship Game and lost the AFL title games in 1968 and 1969.) Oakland won the AFC West with an 11–3 regular season record and defeated the AFC Central runner-up Cincinnati Bengals 31–28 at Oakland Coliseum in the Divisional Round to reach the AFC title game.

This was the fourth playoff meeting in as many seasons between these teams and their fourth meeting overall. The teams had split a pair of Divisional Round matchups (Pittsburgh winning in 1972 and Oakland winning in 1973) before the Steelers' win in the previous AFC title game.

These teams did not meet during the regular season. Their most recent regular season meeting had been the Raiders' 17–0 shutout win in Pittsburgh during Week 3 of the previous season.

This was the first year the NFL used a seeding system to determine home field advantage for the playoffs. (Note: Under the seeding system then in effect, the division winners were seeded first, second and third based on their regular season records and the then-one wild card team in each conference was seeded fourth. However, the caveat in effect since the introduction of the wild card that stipulated a wild card team could never play its own division champion in the Divisional Round was retained. When the wild card team was in the same division as the top seed, which happened in 1975 in the AFC, the wild card team played the second seed in the Divisional Round.) Pittsburgh thus earned the right to host the AFC Championship Game on account of having the best record in the AFC.

== Game summary ==
A defensive struggle in which both teams combined for 12 turnovers (7 for Pittsburgh, 5 for Oakland) turned into an offensive battle as the Steelers managed to stop the Raiders' final drive for the winning score as time ran out.

As the two dominant teams of the era in the AFC, Oakland and Pittsburgh would eventually face in five consecutive playoff games from 1972 to 1976. The Raiders and Steelers also played in three consecutive AFC Championship games from 1974 to 1976.

Already bitter rivals dating back to the 1972 AFC Divisional Playoff game (see: the Immaculate Reception), Raiders' officials, including team owner Al Davis and head coach John Madden, accused the Steelers and Three Rivers Stadium groundskeepers of intentionally allowing the artificial playing surface to ice over, in an effort to slow Oakland's propensity for using a wide-open aerial attack as part of its offensive game plan.

The game started out ugly, as Pittsburgh quarterback Terry Bradshaw was picked off twice in the first quarter. However, Oakland fared no better, as George Blanda's missed 38-yard field goal attempt after Bradshaw's second interception was the closest they would get to scoring in the first half. In the second quarter, Steelers safety Mike Wagner intercepted a pass from Ken Stabler to set up Roy Gerela's 36-yard field goal.

This would be the only score of the first three quarters. In the third quarter, the Raiders blew two big scoring chances. After recovering a fumbled punt by the Steelers, the Raiders got a first down on the Pittsburgh 16-yard line. Then quarterback Ken Stabler threw a short pass to Pete Banaszak, only to watch him fumble the ball as he turned upfield, and linebacker Jack Lambert recovered it. Then after Raiders defensive back Jack Tatum recovered a fumble from Lynn Swann at midfield, Oakland gave the ball back again when Lambert recovered a fumble from running back Clarence Davis on the Steelers 30-yard line. The turnover led to a 5-play, 70-yard drive that ended on running back Franco Harris' 25-yard touchdown run to give the Steelers a 10–0 lead. Oakland stormed back, scoring in less than two minutes on a drive that lasted just six plays, three of them receptions by tight end Dave Casper. Stabler finished the drive with a 14-yard touchdown pass to Mike Siani that cut the score to 10–7.

Midway through the fourth quarter, Lambert recorded his third fumble recovery, this one from running back Marv Hubbard on the Oakland 25, setting up Bradshaw's 20-yard touchdown pass to receiver John Stallworth. Bobby Walden fumbled the snap on the PAT, which kicker Roy Gerela recovered but failed to convert on a drop kick, keeping the score at 16–7. Later on, Bradshaw was knocked out of the game when he took a knee-hit to the head by linebacker Monte Johnson. A few plays later, Oakland recovered their fourth fumble of the day with 1:31 left in the game. The Raiders then drove to the Pittsburgh 24-yard line, where they faced third down and 2 yards to go with 18 seconds left on the clock. They opted to have George Blanda kick a 41-yard field goal (his longest of the season and last of his NFL career) to pull the deficit to 6 points. Then Hubbard recovered the ensuing onside kick with 9 seconds remaining to give Oakland one last attempt to win the game. Cliff Branch then caught a 37-yard reception, but he was stopped at the Pittsburgh 15-yard line by Mel Blount before he could get out of bounds and the clock ran out. Aside from his touchdown run, Harris ran for 54 yards on 26 carries, while also catching 5 passes for 58 yards.

Raiders defender George Atkinson knocked Swann into a severe concussion that would have him hospitalized for 2 days. Swann, however would go on to win the Super Bowl MVP award with yardage records. Lambert set an AFC Championship Game record with three fumble recoveries in the game. This was Oakland's 6th AFC championship loss in the last 8 years.

== Scoring ==
- First quarter
  - no scoring
- Second quarter
  - PIT – field goal Gerela 36 PIT 3–0
- Third quarter
  - no scoring
- Fourth quarter
  - PIT – Harris 25 run (Gerela kick) PIT 10–0
  - OAK – Siani 14 pass from Stabler (Blanda kick) PIT 10–7
  - PIT – Stallworth 20 pass from Bradshaw (kick failed) PIT 16–7
  - OAK – field goal Blanda 41 PIT 16–10

== Aftermath ==
The AFC champion Steelers made their second consecutive Super Bowl appearance. Pittsburgh defeated the Dallas Cowboys of the National Football Conference 21–17 in Super Bowl X to win their second consecutive Super Bowl.

The teams would play once again for the AFC title the following year with the Raiders finally winning their first AFC Championship and Super Bowl. However, Pittsburgh would soon win another two consecutive AFC titles and Super Bowls, for four in total over six seasons. Both of the Steelers' next two AFC title game wins would be against their then-division rival Houston Oilers.

== Officials ==
- Referee: Ben Dreith #12
- Umpire: Art Demmas #78
- Head linesman: Tony Veteri #36
- Line judge: Bruce Alford #24
- Back judge: Pat Knight #73
- Field judge: Pat Mallette
- Alternates Bernie Ulman (#6) and Frank Glover

Note: A seven-official system was not used until 1978

== See also ==
- 1975 NFC Championship Game
- AFC Championship Game
- 1975-76 NFL playoffs
- 1975 NFL season
- American Football Conference
- National Football League
- Raiders–Steelers rivalry
