= Pete Banaszak =

American football player (1944–2026)

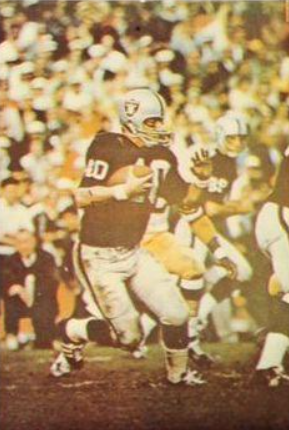
- Banaszak in 1968

No. 40
- Position: Running back

Personal information
- Born: May 21, 1944; Crivitz, Wisconsin, U.S.
- Died: October 24, 2026 (aged 82)
- Listed height: 5 ft 11 in (1.80 m)
- Listed weight: 210 lb (95 kg)

Career information
- High school: Crivitz
- College: Miami (FL)
- AFL draft: 1966: 5th round, 59th overall pick

Career history
- Oakland Raiders (1966–1978)

Awards and highlights
- AFL champion (1967); Super Bowl champion (XI); NFL rushing touchdowns co-leader (1975)

Career statistics
- Rushing yards: 3,772
- Rushing average: 3.9
- Rushing touchdowns: 47
- Stats at Pro Football Reference

Peter Andrew Banaszak (May 21, 1944 – October 24, 2026) was an American professional football player who was a running back for the Oakland Raiders in the American Football League (AFL) and National Football League (NFL). He played college football for the Miami Hurricanes. He played for the Raiders in the AFL from 1966 through 1969, and in the NFL from 1970 through 1978.

== Early life ==
Banaszak was born in Crivitz, Wisconsin, on May 21, 1944. Banaszak's father was an avid Green Bay Packers' fan, and would take Banaszak to Packers games as a child. His father had season tickets to the Packers games, which were eventually passed down to Banaszak’s sister.

He attended Crivitz High School, where he played on the football, basketball and track and field teams. Banaszak was also an honor roll student. He was a halfback and linebacker on the football team. He was all-conference on the football team.

Banaszak threw the discus on the track team, and was the Wisconsin Interscholastic Athletic Association (WIAA) Class C state discus champion in 1961 and 1962, setting a Class C discus record in 1962 (157 ft 6.5 in 48.01 m). He also ran the 100-yard dash and was a member of the 880-yard relay team. He was 6 ft (1.83 m) 200 lb (90.7 kg) as a senior at Crivitz.

While still a high school student, Banaszak considered becoming a Catholic priest. He had an uncle and cousin who were priests. He chose to attend college after receiving a football scholarship offer, although the priesthood was still in his mind.

== College career ==
Banaszak received a football scholarship to attend the University of Miami. He was on the dean's list when he graduated. He had been successfully recruited by Hurricanes' assistant head coach Walt Kichefski, who was from Rhinelander, Wisconsin, 30 miles from Crivitz. The 6 ft 1 (1.85 m) 205 lb (93 kg) Banaszak played on the Hurricanes freshman football team in 1962. In games against Florida State University and the University of Florida, he totaled 150 yards on 37 carries, with three of the four touchdowns Miami scored in those games; while also being considered a hard hitter on defense.

As a sophomore fullback in 1963, Banaszak led Miami in rushing, with 461 yards in 97 carries. He also had 18 receptions for 201 yards, with two rushing touchdowns and one receiving touchdown. His breakout game came against the University of Kentucky when the pass-oriented Miami quarterback George Mira was unable to pass because of the wind. The team turned to Banaszak, who gained 90 yards in 19 carries in leading Miami to a 20–14 win over Kentucky.

As a junior (1964), Banaszak suffered from leg injuries, which had also been a problem for him the preceding season. He had 173 yards on 55 carries, 90 receiving yards on nine receptions, and four total touchdowns. As a senior (1965), he again led Miami in rushing, with 473 yards in 111 attempts and four rushing touchdowns. He also had eight receptions for 65 yards and one receiving touchdown. He was considered a short-yardage and dependable running back at Miami.

He finished his three-year career with the Miami Hurricanes with 263 carries for 1,107 yards and nine touchdowns and 35 receptions for 356 yards and three touchdowns. He suffered from injuries during his time on Miami's varsity team, that limited his playing time. As a senior he was chosen the Hurricanes most valuable player.

== Professional career ==
The Oakland Raiders of the American Football League (AFL) selected Banaszak in the fifth round of the 1966 AFL draft, 59th overall. Banaszak played sparingly for the Raiders in 1966, with only four rushing attempts and occasionally playing special teams. In 1967, he was a reserve running back until the Raiders leading rusher Clem Daniels suffered a broken ankle against the Miami Dolphins on November 19. Banaszak started the Raiders remaining five games as a running back that season. In his first start (November 26) against defending AFL champion Kansas City Chiefs, Banaszak led the Raiders with 81 yards on 13 carries and one rushing touchdown. He also had four receptions for 27 yards. While Raiders head coach John Rauch believed Banaszak would be a capable replacement, he had no expectation that Banaszak would perform as well as he did.

Banaszak had 71 rushing yards and 56 receiving yards in a win over the Houston Oilers on December 10, 1967. He had 86 rushing yards and 73 receiving yards the following week in a win over the New York Jets, including a 72-yard reception. He started in the 1967 AFL Championship Game against the Oilers, a 40–7 victory. Banaszak rushed for 116 yards in that game on 15 carries, and had one reception for four yards. He then started in Super Bowl II against the Green Bay Packers. The Packers won 33–14. Banaszak rushed for 16 yards on six carries, but had four receptions for 69 yards, including a 40- or 41-yard reception from Daryle Lamonica. He also had a fumble in the game, after which the Packers scored; the memory of which stayed with Banaszak.

In 1968, Banaszak started 11 games and was third on the Raiders in rushing, with 362 yards on 91 carries, along with four rushing touchdowns. He also had 15 receptions for 182 yards. He had three carries for six yards and a touchdown, and one reception for 11 yards, in the 1968 AFL Championship Game; a 27–23 loss to the New York Jets. The following season (1969) Banaszak started four games, with 377 yards on 88 carries on the season. He also had 17 receptions for 119 yards and three receiving touchdowns. He had two rushing attempts and two receptions in the Raiders 17–7 loss to the Kansas City Chiefs in the 1969 AFL Championship Game. Banaszak was injured in 1970. He had only 21 rushing attempts and one reception that season; and did not start a game.

The Raiders' starting running backs during the 1970 season were Hewritt Dixon and Charlie Smith. Dixon suffered a knee injury during the 1971 preseason that would have kept him out of play until some time in October. He later joined the Raiders' taxi squad and was reportedly ready to play later in the season, but he did not play for the Raiders in 1971. Smith also was injured before the 1971 season began, and had only 11 carries that season. Banaszak and Marv Hubbard became the Raiders' starting backfield in 1971. Banaszak started all 14 games for the only time in his career. He had 563 rushing yards in 137 attempts and eight rushing touchdowns; along with 13 receptions for 128 yards. He was second on the Raiders in rushing yards (behind Hubbard) and first in rushing touchdowns.

In 1972, head coach John Madden returned Charlie Smith to the starting backfield, next to Hubbard. Banaszak did not start any games. He had 138 yards on 30 carries with one rushing touchdown; and nine receptions for 63 yards. He was a reserve again in 1973 behind Hubbard and Smith, rushing for 198 yards in 34 carries. He started one game in 1974, with 272 yards on 80 carries with five rushing touchdowns.

He had his best season in 1975, even though he did not start any games that season. He had career-highs in carries (187), rushing yards (672) and rushing touchdowns (16). His 16 rushing touchdowns were tied for most in the NFL that season, and his 672 rushing yards led the Raiders that year. He rushed for three touchdowns in a November 23 game against the Washington Redskins, and in a December 21 game against the Chiefs. He also rushed for two touchdowns in the season's first game against the Dolphins, in an October 26 game against the San Diego Chargers, and in a November 2 game against the Denver Broncos. He received the Gorman Award from his teammates, indicative of the team's most valuable player.

The Raiders defeated the Cincinnati Bengals 31–28 in the divisional round of the 1975–76 AFC playoffs. Banaszak rushed for 62 yards on 17 carries and one touchdown in that game. The Raiders lost the 1975 AFC Championship Game to the Pittsburgh Steelers, 16–10. The game was played in freezing conditions with hard hitting on both sides. Banaszak rushed for 33 yards on eight carries, and had 12 yards on two receptions. He also made one of the game's eight fumbles.

In 1976, Banaszak had 370 yards on 114 carries, with five rushing touchdowns; along with 15 receptions for 74 yards. The Raiders defeated the Steelers in the 1976 AFC Championship Game, 24–7. Banaszak had 46 yards on 15 carries in that game. He also caught a five-yard touchdown pass from Raiders future Hall of Fame quarterback Ken Stabler.

In what was arguably the highlight of his 13-year career, he rushed for two touchdowns in the Raiders 32–14 victory over the Minnesota Vikings in Super Bowl XI. After the Super Bowl win that day, Banaszak said "I never felt so good about anything in my life as I do about this victory. I wanted those two touchdowns. Damnit, I owed it to myself after 11 years in this league".

In 1977, Banaszak had 214 yards on 67 carries and another five rushing touchdowns. In the Raiders' double overtime 37–31 divisional round victory over the Baltimore Colts, he rushed for 37 yards on 11 carries, and one touchdown. In his final season (1978), he had 147 yards on 43 carries, and seven receptions for 78 yards. Banaszak played his entire 13-year career with the Raiders, from 1966 to 1969 in the AFL and from 1970 to 1978 in the NFL. During his career, Banaszak had 3,772 rushing yards (3.9 yards per carry), 121 receptions for 1,022 yards, and 52 touchdowns (47 rushing and five receiving). In 19 playoff games, he had 427 rushing yards and five rushing touchdowns, and 15 receptions for 133 yards and one receiving touchdown.

== Death ==
Pete Banaszak died in October 2026, at the age of 82.

== Legacy and honors ==
Banaszak was inducted into the University of Miami Sports Hall of Fame in 1983. He was inducted into National Polish-American Sports Hall of Fame in 1990; an honor he considered one of the highlights of his career.

He was known for having "a nose for the goal line". His Raider teammates and fans called him "Rooster". Banaszak consistently received playing time throughout his career as a running back and on special teams; but was typically not a starter, starting 31 times in 173 games. He attributed his longevity in part to the fact he was not a regular starter, as starting running backs have shorter careers because of the beating they take. Through the 2021 season, he ranked second to Hall of Fame running back Marcus Allen in Raiders' history for most rushing touchdowns.

Stabler called Banaszak "the best short-yardage runner I ever saw". The Raiders never had a losing season during Banaszak's tenure with the team. The Raiders' Hall of Fame offensive tackle Art Shell said Banaszak "was the toughest guy I’ve seen on short-yardage situations . . . Even if there were no holes, he would get the first down". Former teammate and later Raiders' coach Tom Flores said Banaszak "was always the total team player, a very unselfish person who was willing to contribute any way possible”. Banaszak's original Raiders' head coach John Rauch said “Give me 40 Pete Banaszaks and I’ll win you the Super Bowl”.

=== The 'Holy Roller' play ===
At the very end of a September 1978 game against the San Diego Chargers, with the Raiders behind in the score, Banaszak was involved in the "Holy Roller" play. While Raiders' quarterback Stabler was in the process of being sacked by Woodrow Lowe, Stabler pitched the ball forward in an underhand motion, which the officials ruled was a fumble. Banaszak dove for the ball at the Chargers' 12-yard line, and batted it forward toward the goal line, just as the Chargers' Fred Dean was landing on him. Banaszak batted the ball forward because he knew that if he had gotten possession of the ball the officials would have deemed him tackled by Dean and the game would have ended. Future Hall of Fame Raiders' tight end Dave Casper attempted to pick the ball up at the five-yard line, but could not get hold of it, and dribbled it with his feet into the endzone and then fell on the ball. Despite strenuous protests from the Chargers, the uncertain officials conferred and determined it was a touchdown. Banaszak said later "The officials didn't know what to do. I think we talked them into calling it a touchdown". The NFL instituted a new rule because of this play before the 1979 season; that on a fourth down or in the last two minutes of a game, if an offensive player fumbles, only that player can recover the ball and/or advance the ball.

== Personal life ==
In the offseasons during his professional career, Banaszak worked for Ryder and REA Express. During that time, he also owned an oil bulk plant in Crivitz, which he leased to a large oil company, and had other land holdings in Wisconsin and Florida. In the 1980s, Banaszak was among the many athletes and others who suffered devastating financial losses as victims of the Technical Equities Corporation investment fraud. He worked for Crowley Maritime in Oakland, that eventually led him to the Jacksonville, Florida area, where he and his wife resided at Ponte Vedra Beach. In the early 2000s, he began co-hosting the popular post-game radio show, "The Fifth Quarter", for the Jacksonville Jaguars, with Cole Pepper. Banaszak later moved to the St. Augustine, Florida.

Banaszak also had a hole in one in 2023 at Kennsington Golf Club in Canfield, Ohio, at the 17th hole (155 yards) and hit a 3 hybrid.

== NFL career statistics ==
Legend
	Super Bowl champion
	Won the AFL Championship
	Led the league
**Bold**	Career high

Year	Team	Games		Rushing						Receiving					Fumbles	
Year	Team	GP	GS	Att	Yds	Avg	Y/G	Lng	TD	Rec	Yds	Avg	Lng	TD	Fum	FR
1966	OAK	14	0	4	18	4.5	1.3	7	0	1	11	11.0	11	0	0	0
1967	OAK	10	5	68	376	5.5	37.6	**47**	1	16	**192**	12.0	**72**	1	2	0
1968	OAK	13	11	91	362	4.0	27.8	43	4	15	182	**12.1**	49	1	**6**	2
1969	OAK	12	4	88	377	4.3	31.4	40	0	**17**	119	7.0	19	**3**	0	1
1970	OAK	10	0	21	75	3.6	7.5	16	2	1	2	2.0	2	0	1	0
1971	OAK	14	**14**	137	563	4.1	40.2	30	8	13	128	9.8	28	0	3	0
1972	OAK	14	0	30	138	4.6	9.9	15	1	9	63	7.0	16	0	1	0
1973	OAK	14	0	34	198	**5.8**	14.1	26	0	6	31	5.2	9	0	0	**3**
1974	OAK	14	1	80	272	3.4	19.4	20	5	9	64	7.1	12	0	1	0
1975	OAK	14	0	**187**	**672**	3.6	**48.0**	27	**16**	10	64	6.4	11	0	1	1
1976	OAK	14	1	114	370	3.2	26.4	15	5	15	74	4.9	20	0	2	0
1977	OAK	14	0	67	214	3.2	15.3	11	5	2	14	7.0	8	0	2	1
1978	OAK	**16**	0	43	137	3.2	8.6	10	0	7	78	11.1	20	0	1	0
Career		173	36	964	3,772	3.9	21.8	47	47	121	1,022	8.4	72	5	18	8
