= Raiders–Steelers rivalry =

National Football League rivalry

- Las Vegas Raiders Pittsburgh Steelers
- Location: Las Vegas, Pittsburgh
- First meeting: October 25, 1970; Raiders 31, Steelers 14
- Latest meeting: October 13, 2024; Steelers 32, Raiders 13
- Next meeting: 2027
- Stadiums: Raiders: Allegiant Stadium; Steelers: Acrisure Stadium

Statistics
- Total meetings: 33
- All-time series: Raiders: 17–16
- Regular season series: Raiders: 14–13
- Postseason results: Tied: 3–3
- Largest victory: Raiders: 38–10 (1983); Steelers: 35–3 (2010)
- Most points scored: Raiders: 45 (1980); Steelers: 38 (2015)
- Longest win streak: Raiders: 6 (1976–1984); Steelers: 3 (1972–1973; 1994–2000; 2022–present)
- Current win streak: Steelers: 3 (2022–present)

Post-season history
- 1972 AFC Divisional: Steelers won: 13–7; 1973 AFC Divisional: Raiders won: 33–14; 1974 AFC Championship: Steelers won: 24–13; 1975 AFC Championship: Steelers won: 16–10; 1976 AFC Championship: Raiders won: 24–7; 1983 AFC Divisional: Raiders won: 38–10

The Raiders–Steelers rivalry is an NFL rivalry between the Las Vegas Raiders and Pittsburgh Steelers.

Both teams compete in the American Football Conference (AFC). The historically bitter rivalry started with the Steelers' first playoff win over the Raiders by way of Franco Harris' Immaculate Reception on December 23, 1972. The two teams met in the playoffs for five consecutive seasons (1972–76), an NFL record that has yet to be matched. The series was regarded as one of the fiercest rivalries in the history of professional sports, especially in the 1970s. Las Vegas is one of four AFC teams with a winning overall record against Pittsburgh (the Denver Broncos, Jacksonville Jaguars, and New England Patriots are the other three). CBS Sports ranked this rivalry as the best NFL rivalry of the 1970s.

The Raiders lead the overall series, 17–16. The two teams have met six times in the playoffs, winning three each.

== History ==
=== 1970–1984: Beginnings of the rivalry and early success ===
The inaugural game of the rivalry was during Week 6 of the 1970 season where the Raiders crushed the visiting Steelers 31–14. The Steelers would miss out on the postseason while the Raiders went on to lose to the Colts in the AFC Championship.

Two seasons later in 1972, the Raiders visited the Steelers in Week 1. The Steelers were more competitive than in previous seasons and won the game 34–28. Both teams finished first in their divisions (Steelers 11–3, Raiders 10–3–1) and eventually went on to play each other in the postseason. The resulting game, the Immaculate Reception, spawned a heated rivalry between the Raiders and Steelers, a rivalry that was at its peak during the 1970s, when both teams were among the best in the league and both were known for their hard-hitting, physical play (The Steelers won 13–7).

The teams met in the playoffs in each of the next four seasons, starting with the Raiders' 33–14 victory in the 1973 divisional playoffs. Pittsburgh used the AFC Championship Game victories over Oakland (24–13 at Oakland in 1974 and 16–10 at Pittsburgh in 1975) as a springboard to victories in Super Bowl IX and Super Bowl X, before the Raiders notched a 24–7 AFC Championship Game victory at home in 1976 on their way to winning Super Bowl XI. To date, the two last met in the playoffs in 1983 when the eventual Super Bowl champion Raiders, playing in Los Angeles at the time, crushed the Steelers 38–10.

=== 1984–2002 ===
The rivalry cooled off in the late 1980s, mainly due to the Raiders on-field struggles since appearing in Super Bowl XVIII. The teams also met infrequently for several years, playing only twice in the Raiders' final 10 seasons in Los Angeles, both at the Los Angeles Memorial Coliseum. The Los Angeles Raiders never played in Pittsburgh, as the teams went 20 years (1980–2000) without facing each other in the Steel City.

In Week 3 of the 1990 season, the Steelers would visit the Raiders and get beat 21–3. Both teams would have winning records (Raiders 12–4, Steelers 9–7) but the Steelers sat out of the playoffs while the Raiders made a trip to the AFC Championship only to see themselves get knocked out by the Buffalo Bills.

In Week 13 of the 1994 season, the Steelers visited the Raiders and crushed them by a final score of 21–3 in what was the Steelers last visit to Los Angeles until at least 2019, due to the Raiders moving back to Oakland the following year and the Los Angeles Rams moving to St. Louis as well until their return to Los Angeles in 2016. The Steelers would make the playoffs with the Raiders sitting out despite both teams having winning records (Steelers 12–4, Raiders 9–7) in a reverse of the 1990 season. The Steelers were eventually knocked out of the playoffs by the Raiders' division rival Chargers in the AFC Championship.

In Week 15 of the 1995 season, the Steelers visited the Raiders and crushed them 29–10. The Raiders would miss out on the postseason while the Steelers went on ahead to lose to the Dallas Cowboys in Super Bowl XXX.

In Week 14 of the 2000 season, the 10–2 Raiders had possession of home field advantage throughout the playoffs and visited the 6–6 Steelers. The Steelers would go on to win 21–20 and prevented the Raiders from obtaining home field advantage as the AFC's first seed would eventually fall into the hands of the Titans.

In Week 2 of the 2002 season, the Raiders visited the Steelers and won 30–17. Both teams would have winning records (Raiders 11–5, Steelers 10–5–1) and possession of the 1st and 3rd seeds of the playoffs and win their divisions. Despite this, neither team played each other in the postseason as the Steelers were eventually knocked out by the Titans while the Raiders went on to lose against the Buccaneers in Super Bowl XXXVII. Since then, the Raiders collapsed after losing the Super Bowl and lost quarterback Rich Gannon to a career-ending injury in 2004, missing the playoffs each year until 2016, while the Steelers have stayed fairly successful under new quarterback Ben Roethlisberger, winning two more Super Bowls and appearing in a third one.

=== 2003–present ===
Even with the competitive slide of the Raiders, the games between the two clubs have still seen memorable moments. The Raiders in 2009 rallied to defeat the Steelers 27–24 in a game where the two teams combined for five touchdowns in the fourth quarter, the game lead changed hands on all five, and the game winner by future Steelers backup quarterback Bruce Gradkowski came with nine seconds to go in the fourth. A year later the Steelers routed the Raiders 35–3 in a game famous for a brawl following a sucker-punch of Steelers quarterback Ben Roethlisberger by the Raiders' Richard Seymour.

In Week 3 of 2012, the Raiders rallied from down 31–21 in the fourth quarter to win 34–31 on a last-second Sebastian Janikowski field goal. The game saw several skirmishes between the two teams and NFL Network's rebroadcast of the game made a point of drawing parallels with the rivalry's 1970s apex.

In Week 8 of 2013, the Steelers went to Oakland to take on the Raiders and their then-starting quarterback Terrelle Pryor. Pryor ran for a 93-yard touchdown which would be the longest run by any QB in NFL history. The Steelers attempted a late-game rally but came up short, losing 21–18.

In Week 9 of the 2015 season, the Raiders visited the Steelers in Pittsburgh. Sophomore Raiders quarterback Derek Carr threw for four touchdowns and an endzone interception. They erased a 35–21 fourth quarter deficit and tied it at 35 with 1:15 left, but despite losing Ben Roethlisberger to a foot injury the Steelers behind backup quarterback Landry Jones drove to the Raiders one-yard line; the key play was a 57-yard catch by Antonio Brown on his way to a franchise-record 284 receiving yards. The winning field goal ended a 38–35 Steelers triumph in the highest-scoring game in the rivalry since 1980.

The teams met in Week 14 of the 2018 season in what was the Steelers' last trip to Oakland, due to the Raiders relocating to Las Vegas in 2020. In the game, the Steelers were able to take a late 21–17 lead with a Ben Roethlisberger touchdown pass to JuJu Smith-Schuster, but Oakland quickly responded on the next drive, scoring a touchdown to retake the lead in less than two minutes. The Steelers advanced deep into Oakland territory with a quick pass to James Washington, who pitched it to Smith-Schuster for a big gain in the waning seconds of the game, but lost to the Raiders after kicker Chris Boswell slipped and missed a potential game-tying field goal. The final score was 24–21 Oakland. The game, as it turns out, would have major playoff effects on Pittsburgh. The loss to Oakland, combined with a loss at the New Orleans Saints two weeks later, allowed the 10–6 Baltimore Ravens to win the AFC North after winning their final game against the Cleveland Browns, and took the 9–6–1 Steelers out of the postseason.

Following the season, the Steelers were forced to trade their talented but disgruntled receiver Antonio Brown to the Raiders. However, his stint with the Raiders was short-lived as he was released before the Raiders' first regular season game.

The two teams met again in Week 2 of the 2021 season at Heinz Field in Pittsburgh, with this being the first meeting between the two clubs since the Raiders relocated to Las Vegas in 2020. The Raiders would once again upset the Steelers for the second time in four seasons, winning 26–17 behind 382 yards passing and two touchdowns from Derek Carr. The game was also notable for the ejection of Steelers offensive lineman Trai Turner early in the fourth quarter, as a result of Turner spitting on Raiders linebacker Marquel Lee during an altercation between the two clubs following a Steelers touchdown, a 25-yard pass from Ben Roethlisberger to rookie running back Najee Harris. The victory turned out to be a crucial one for the Raiders, as both teams would make the playoffs that season, but the Raiders' win helped them obtain the fifth seed in the AFC while the Steelers had to settle for the seventh seed.

The two teams met for a primetime game on December 24, 2022, to mark the 50th anniversary of the Immaculate Reception. The number 32 of Harris—who died four days prior to the game, and was originally scheduled to be in attendance—was retired during a ceremony at halftime. After trailing 10–6 after some time in the fourth quarter, Steelers rookie quarterback Kenny Pickett would connect with fellow rookie receiver George Pickens on a late touchdown pass to take a 13–10 lead. After getting the ball back on offense, Derek Carr threw a deep pass intended for Hunter Renfrow that turned out to be the eventual game-losing interception by Cameron Sutton. This was the lowest-scoring game between the teams since 1984, and also served as Carr's final start and game as a Raider, as he was benched by the team for their final two games and then released the following offseason.

In Week 3 of the 2023 season, the Steelers visited the Raiders in what would be their first ever visit to Las Vegas since the Raiders' relocation to the city. Moving up 23–7 into the fourth quarter, the Raiders tried to rally by shortening the deficit to 23–18. They fell short of the comeback after new QB Jimmy Garoppolo threw the game-losing interception, sealing the Steelers' first road win against the Raiders overall since 1995. Had the Raiders won, they would've gotten into the playoff as the seventh seed.

== Season-by-season results ==
Oakland/Los Angeles/Las Vegas Raiders vs. Pittsburgh Steelers Season-by-Season Results
1970s (Raiders, 6–5)

Season	Results	Location	Overall series	Notes
1970	Raiders; 31–14	Oakland-Alameda County Coliseum	Raiders; 1–0	As a result of the AFL–NFL merge, the Raiders and Steelers bare placed in the American Football Conference (AFC), but the Raiders are placed in the AFC West and the Steelers are placed in the AFC Central.
1972	Steelers; 34–28	Three Rivers Stadium	Tie; 1–1	
1972 playoffs	Steelers 13–7	Three Rivers Stadium	Steelers 2–1	First playoff meeting. AFC Divisional. Steelers' RB Franco Harris famously makes a play known as the "Immaculate Reception" to win the game.
1973	Steelers; 17–9	Oakland-Alameda County Coliseum	Steelers; 3–1	
1973 playoffs	Raiders 33–14	Oakland-Alameda County Coliseum	Steelers 3–2	Second playoff meeting. AFC Divisional.
1974	Raiders; 17–0	Three Rivers Stadium	Tie; 3–3	Only shutout game of the rivalry.
1974 playoffs	Steelers 24–13	Oakland-Alameda County Coliseum	Steelers 4–3	AFC Championship Game. Steelers go on to win Super Bowl IX.
1975 playoffs	Steelers 16–10	Three Rivers Stadium	Steelers 5–3	Teams meet in second straight AFC Championship Game. Steelers go on to win Super Bowl X.
1976	Raiders; 31–28	Oakland-Alameda County Coliseum	Steelers; 5–4	Raiders overcame a 28–14 fourth-quarter deficit.
1976 playoffs	Raiders 24–7	Oakland-Alameda County Coliseum	Tie 5–5	Teams meet in third straight AFC Championship Game. Raiders and Steelers meet in the playoffs for five consecutive seasons, an NFL record. Raiders go on to win Super Bowl XI.
1977	Raiders; 17–6	Three Rivers Stadium	Raiders; 6–5	

1980s (Raiders, 3–1)

Season	Results	Location	Overall series	Notes
1980	Raiders; 45–34	Three Rivers Stadium	Raiders; 7–5	Raiders score their most points in a game against the Steelers. Raiders win Super Bowl XV.
1981	Raiders; 30–27	Oakland-Alameda County Coliseum	Raiders; 8–5	Last season until the 1995 season the Raiders played as an Oakland-based team, as they would relocate to Los Angeles the following season.
1983 playoffs	Raiders 38–10	Los Angeles Memorial Coliseum	Raiders 9–5	AFC Divisional Round. Raiders win six straight meetings (1976–1984). Raiders go on to win Super Bowl XVIII.
1984	Steelers; 13–7	Los Angeles Memorial Coliseum	Raiders; 9–6	

1990s (Steelers, 2–1)

Season	Results	Location	Overall series	Notes
1990	Raiders; 20–3	Los Angeles Memorial Coliseum	Raiders; 10–6	
1994	Steelers; 21–3	Los Angeles Memorial Coliseum	Raiders; 10–7	Last season the Raiders played as a Los Angeles-based team.
1995	Steelers; 29–10	Oakland-Alameda County Coliseum	Raiders; 10–8	Raiders relocate back to Oakland. Steelers lose Super Bowl XXX.

2000s (Tied, 3–3)

Season	Results	Location	Overall series	Notes
2000	Steelers; 21–20	Three Rivers Stadium	Raiders; 10–9	Raiders' first visit to Pittsburgh since the 1980 season. Last matchup at the Three Rivers Stadium, as the Steelers opened Heinz Field (now known as Acrisure Stadium) the following season.
2002	Raiders; 30–17	Heinz Field	Raiders; 11–9	First meeting at Heinz Field. Raiders lose Super Bowl XXXVII.
2003	Steelers; 27–7	Heinz Field	Raiders; 11–10	
2004	Steelers; 24–21	Heinz Field	Tie; 11–11	
2006	Raiders; 20–13	McAfee Coliseum	Raiders; 12–11	First start in the series for Ben Roethlisberger.
2009	Raiders; 27–24	Heinz Field	Raiders; 13–11	

2010s (Raiders, 3–2)

Season	Results	Location	Overall series	Notes
2010	Steelers; 35–3	Heinz Field	Raiders; 13–12	Steelers lose Super Bowl XLV.
2012	Raiders; 34–31	O.co Coliseum	Raiders; 14–12	
2013	Raiders; 21–18	O.co Coliseum	Raiders; 15–12	
2015	Steelers; 38–35	Heinz Field	Raiders; 15–13	Steelers score their most points in a game against the Raiders.
2018	Raiders; 24–21	Oakland Coliseum	Raiders; 16–13	Last season Steelers faced the Raiders as an Oakland-based team, as they would relocate to Las Vegas in the 2020 season. Steelers missed potential game-tying field goal.

2020s (Steelers, 3–1)

Season	Results	Location	Overall series	Notes
2021	Raiders; 26–17	Heinz Field	Raiders; 17–13	Final start in the series for Ben Roethlisberger.
2022	Steelers; 13–10	Acrisure Stadium	Raiders; 17–14	Celebration of the 50th anniversary of the Immaculate Reception.
2023	Steelers; 23–18	Allegiant Stadium	Raiders; 17–15	First meeting in Las Vegas.
2024	Steelers; 32−13	Allegiant Stadium	Raiders; 17−16	

Summary of Results

Season	Season series	at Oakland/Los Angeles/Las Vegas Raiders	at Pittsburgh Steelers	Notes
Regular season	Raiders 14–13	Raiders 8–6	Steelers 7–6	
Postseason	Tie 3–3	Raiders 3–1	Steelers 2–0	AFC Divisional: 1972, 1973, 1983; AFC Championship: 1974, 1975, 1976
Regular and postseason	Raiders 17–16	Raiders 11–7	Steelers 9–6	

== See also ==
- National Football League rivalries
