= Mike Shanahan =

American football coach (born 1952)

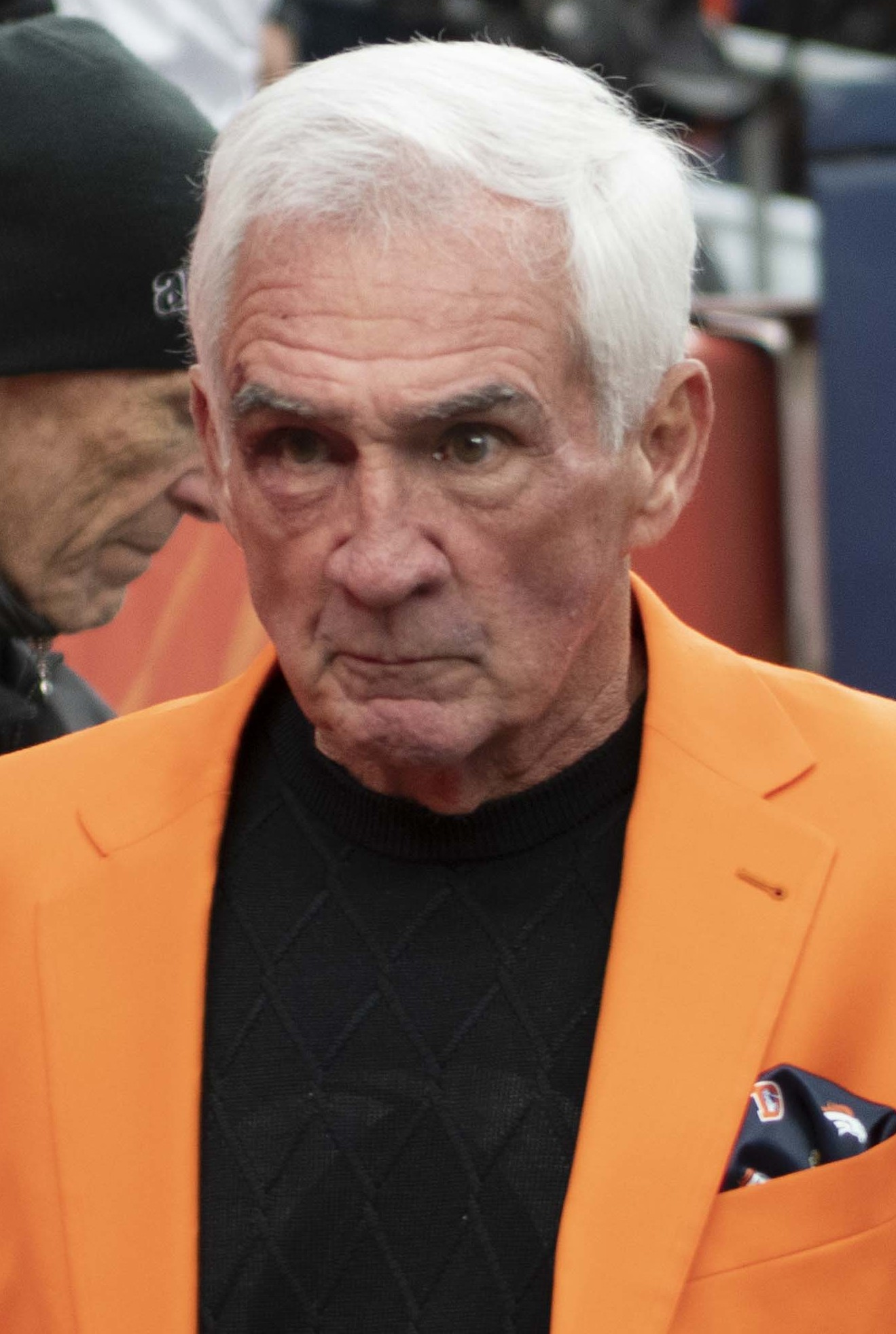
- Shanahan in 2021

Personal information
- Born: August 24, 1952 (age 74); Oak Park, Illinois, U.S.

Career information
- High school: East Leyden (Franklin Park, Illinois)
- College: Eastern Illinois (1970–1972)

Career history

Coaching
- Oklahoma (1975–1976) Graduate assistant; Northern Arizona (1977) Offensive backfield; Eastern Illinois (1978) Offensive coordinator; Minnesota (1979) Offensive coordinator; Florida (1980–1983) Offensive coordinator; Denver Broncos (1984–1987); Wide receivers coach (1984); Offensive coordinator (1985–1987); Los Angeles Raiders (1988–1989) Head coach; Denver Broncos (1989–1991); Quarterbacks coach (1989–1990); Offensive coordinator (1991); San Francisco 49ers (1992–1994); Offensive coordinator & quarterbacks coach (1992–1993); Offensive coordinator (1994); Denver Broncos (1995–2008) Head coach; Washington Redskins (2010–2013) Head coach

Operations
- Denver Broncos (1995–2008); Vice president of football operations (1995–2001); Executive vice president of football operations (2002–2008); Washington Redskins (2010–2013) Executive vice president

Awards and highlights
- As a head coach: 2× Super Bowl champion (XXXII, XXXIII); Denver Broncos Ring of Fame; As an assistant coach: Super Bowl champion (XXIX); National champion (1975); Division II national champion (1978)

Head coaching record
- Regular season: 170–138 (.552)
- Postseason: 8–6 (.571)
- Career: 178–144 (.553)
- Coaching profile at Pro Football Reference

Michael Edward Shanahan (/ˈʃænəhæn/ SHAN-ə-han; born August 24, 1952) is an American former football coach, best known as the head coach of the Denver Broncos of the National Football League (NFL) from 1995 to 2008. During his fourteen seasons with the Broncos, he led the team to two consecutive Super Bowl victories in XXXII and XXXIII; along with being the first Super Bowl championships in team history, they were the seventh team to win consecutive Super Bowls in NFL history. His head coaching career spanned a total of twenty seasons and also included stints with the Los Angeles Raiders and Washington Redskins. He is the father of San Francisco 49ers head coach Kyle Shanahan.

== Early career ==
Shanahan played high school football at East Leyden High School, Franklin Park, Illinois, where he played wishbone quarterback for coach Jack Leese's 1968 and 1969 Eagles teams. Shanahan held the single-game rushing record of 260 yards on 15 carries (which was set in a 32–8 win over Hinsdale South on September 20, 1969) until it was broken in 1976 by Dennis Cascio but is now held by Angel Maldonado with 312 yards on 25 carries in 2009. He graduated from high school in 1970.

He was a quarterback at Eastern Illinois University, where he joined Delta Sigma Phi fraternity. In 1972, a piercingly hard hit on the practice field ruptured one of his kidneys, which caused his heart to stop for thirty seconds and nearly killed him. A priest was summoned to administer the last rites to Shanahan, a devout Roman Catholic.

== College coaching ==
In 1975 and 1976, Shanahan was a graduate assistant on Barry Switzer's staff at the University of Oklahoma. In 1977, he became the offensive backfield coach at Northern Arizona University. NAU went 9–2 and played in the NCAA Division II Football Championship playoffs. He left after one season to return to his alma mater as offensive coordinator. He helped Eastern Illinois win the Division II football championship. Shanahan then worked as the offensive coordinator for the University of Minnesota for a single season, before accepting the same position at the University of Florida under head coach Charley Pell in 1980. Shanahan stayed with the Gators through 1983.

== NFL career ==
=== Assistant coaching stints ===
Shanahan first served as a receivers coach and later offensive coordinator for the Denver Broncos under Dan Reeves from 1984 to 1987. This firmly places Mike Shanahan on the Tom Landry tree of coaching, as Dan Reeves was one of Landry's greatest disciples. It was his skill as an offensive mind that garnered Shanahan the attention of maverick Oakland Raiders owner Al Davis. After Shanahan and the Raiders parted ways four games into the 1989 season, Shanahan returned to the Broncos as quarterbacks coach on October 16, 1989. He was fired a couple years later by Reeves after finding himself in the middle of a growing feud between Reeves and quarterback John Elway.

=== Los Angeles Raiders ===
Shanahan was hired by the Los Angeles Raiders in 1988 to replace longtime Raiders coach Tom Flores. He was the Raiders' first head coach hired from outside the organization since Davis himself 23 years earlier. Shanahan (who proved very unpopular with the players) and the micromanaging Davis clashed almost immediately, and this was only exacerbated after the Raiders finished a disappointing 7–9, losing four of their last five games. Tensions increased towards the end of the season when wide receivers coach and Shanahan loyalist Nick Nicolau got into a heated argument with assistant coach Art Shell (a Davis loyalist) in which Nicolau reportedly accused Shell of having a job only by virtue of his friendship with Davis. When Shell went to Davis later to ask if this was true, Davis' response was to immediately fire Nicolau. Shanahan responded by firing running backs coach Joe Scannella and offensive coordinator Tom Walsh (both Davis hires), but Davis ordered them both back to work. At the end of the season, Shanahan fired defensive assistants Willie Brown and Charlie Sumner. An enraged Davis re-hired Brown to a different position in the organization. When the Raiders began 1–3 in 1989, Shanahan himself was fired and replaced by Shell. Shanahan's final Raiders record was 8–12 in less than two seasons, going 2–7 after a 6–5 start.

=== San Francisco 49ers ===
In 1992, Shanahan was hired as offensive coordinator for the San Francisco 49ers under head coach George Seifert, capping his rise with a victory in Super Bowl XXIX after the 1994 season. His years under Seifert placed him in the Bill Walsh coaching tree. In 1994 while coaching for the 49ers, Shanahan added to the ongoing feud between him and Raiders owner Al Davis when he had then quarterback Elvis Grbac throw a football at Davis' head, which missed by a few inches as Davis was able to dodge it just in time; afterwards Davis responded with an obscene gesture.

=== Denver Broncos ===
Shanahan's success with the 49ers earned him a head coaching spot once more, this time back in Denver with the Broncos beginning in 1995. He led the Broncos to back-to-back Super Bowl championships in the 1997 and 1998 seasons, during which time the Broncos set a then-record for victories in two seasons.

Between 1996 and 1998, the Broncos set the NFL record for victories by going 46–10 over a three-year span. The 1998 Broncos won their first 13 games on their way to a 14–2 mark. Shanahan, taking his cue from West Coast offense guru Bill Walsh, was well known for scripting the first 15 offensive plays of the game, and helped the 1998 Broncos set an NFL record for first quarter points scored in a season. In 2005, he passed Dan Reeves as the winningest coach in franchise history.

Shanahan is known for an offense featuring zone running plays and play-action passes. He has often found unheralded running backs from later rounds of the annual NFL draft and then turned them into league-leading rushers behind small-but-powerful offensive lines. Examples of this phenomenon are Terrell Davis, Mike Anderson, Olandis Gary, Clinton Portis, Reuben Droughns and Tatum Bell, all of whom have had at least one 1,000-yard season in a Denver uniform during Shanahan's tenure.

In 1999, with the assistance of writer Adam Schefter, Shanahan penned Think Like a Champion, a motivational book about leadership; it was published by HarperCollins. In 2006, he cooperated with Stefan Fatsis's endeavor to spend a year as a Broncos place-kicker, and much of the resulting book A Few Seconds of Panic (2008) covers Shanahan's coaching from the player's point of view.

After Elway's retirement and Davis' career-ending injuries, Shanahan went six years without a playoff win (including three seasons when the Broncos failed to qualify for the postseason), a drought which caused criticism from fans. The playoff drought ended during the 2005–06 postseason when the Broncos defeated the two-time defending Super Bowl champion New England Patriots in the AFC Divisional Round of the playoffs at Invesco Field at Mile High. The victory, however, would be Shanahan's last playoff win as a head coach.

Shanahan was fired after the 2008 NFL season following a collapse that caused the Broncos to miss the playoffs for a third consecutive year. Although the Broncos held an 8–5 record by Week 14 and would have won the AFC West with one more victory, the team lost their remaining three games and the 8–8 San Diego Chargers won the division on a tiebreaker.

=== Washington Redskins ===
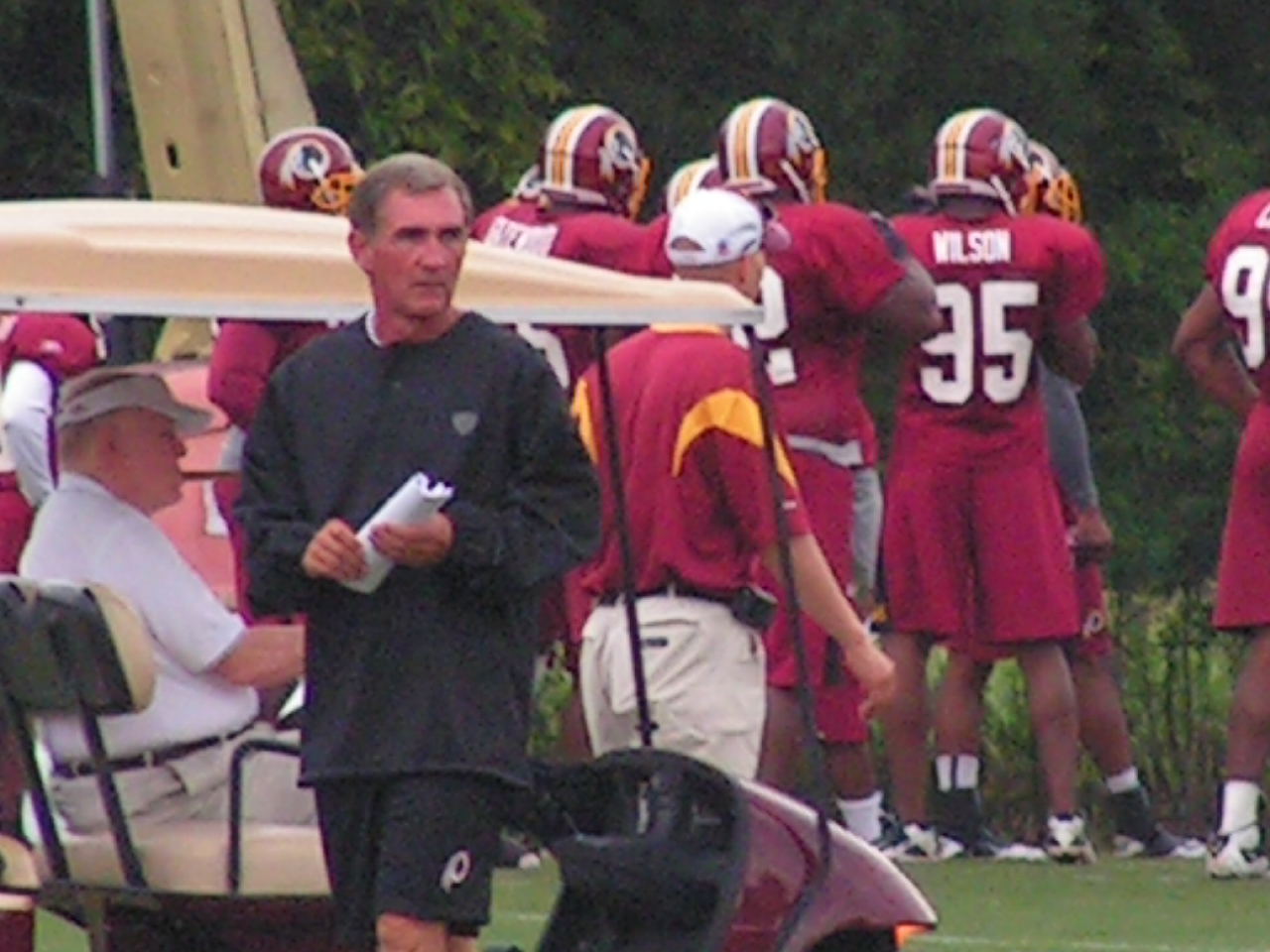
Mike Shanahan at an Open Practice on August 5, 2010, at Redskins Park in Ashburn, Virginia

In the early part of the 2009 season, it was reported that the Washington Redskins were interested in naming Shanahan their head coach, replacing Jim Zorn. Although this was reported by several media outlets, the Redskins' vice president of football operations, Vinny Cerrato, stated that a coaching change would not be considered until the end of the season. On November 18, 2009, ESPN's Adam Schefter reported that the Buffalo Bills had contacted Shanahan about their head coaching vacancy after the team parted ways with former coach Dick Jauron.

On January 5, 2010, Shanahan was formally introduced as the Redskins' 24th full-time head coach. As part of the deal, he was also named vice president of football operations, with the final say on football matters. He was one of several coaches who also had the title or powers of general manager, along with New England's Bill Belichick and others. Shanahan was signed to a five-year, $35 million contract. Several months earlier, Bruce Allen was named the team's general manager. Shanahan and Allen split the duties held by a general manager, with Shanahan having the final say. This model was similar to how Belichick and Scott Pioli worked during their eight years in New England.

Shanahan's son, Kyle Shanahan, became the offensive coordinator of the Washington Redskins on January 20, 2010. While he was on the Redskins staff with his father, Kyle Shanahan would be among many of the young assistant coaches who would quickly receive their first NFL head coaching jobs within the decade, along with tight ends coach Sean McVay and quarterbacks coach Matt LaFleur, and later on wide receivers coach Mike McDaniel.

Shanahan had a combined 11–21 record in his first two seasons as Redskins coach, followed by a 3–6 start to the 2012 season, but ended the year with a seven-game winning streak on the way to the team's first NFC East title and home playoff game since the 1999 season. During this season Shanahan also continued his trend of developing unheralded draft picks into 1000-yard rushers, with the 6th-rounder Alfred Morris. The Redskins lost in the Wild Card round of the 2012 NFL Playoffs to the Seattle Seahawks by a score of 24–14, during which his quarterback Robert Griffin III sustained a tear of his LCL and a damaged ACL to his previously injured knee. Shanahan came under criticism for his handling of the injury, both in bringing Griffin back to play after the initial injury on December 9 and keeping him in the game against the Seahawks after reinjuring the knee. While there were reports in December 2012 that the Redskins were considering negotiating a contract extension with Shanahan in the 2013 offseason, this did not happen and there were later reports that Shanahan had considered resigning after the end of the year.

Griffin underwent reconstructive surgery of his knee on January 9 and returned as the starter for the beginning of the 2013 season, though Shanahan held him out of the preseason to protect him from further injury. The team continued to struggle in 2013. With the final three games of the regular season, Shanahan decided to make Griffin inactive for the rest of the season because Shanahan thought it was best for both Griffin's and the Redskins' future.

Redskins owner Daniel Snyder fired Shanahan on December 30, 2013. The team finished 3–13 in the 2013 season, and was in last place in the NFC East division three of Shanahan's four seasons.

=== Potential return to coaching ===
Shanahan has not held a coaching position since his dismissal from the Washington Redskins in 2013. In 2015, he was interviewed by the Buffalo Bills and Chicago Bears for their vacant head coaching spots, as well as the Oakland Raiders, whom he previously coached from 1988 to 1989, when the club was based in Los Angeles. Shanahan was also interviewed for the vacant head coaching spot by the San Francisco 49ers in 2015, whom Shanahan previously served as their offensive coordinator/quarterbacks coach from 1992 to 1994 and was part of the 1994 team that won Super Bowl XXIX. Coincidentally, the 49ers would hire his son, Kyle Shanahan as their head coach 2 years later. In 2016, Shanahan was nearly hired as the head coach of the Miami Dolphins before they hired Chicago Bears offensive coordinator Adam Gase for the vacant spot on January 9, 2016. On August 17, 2019, it was revealed that the Denver Broncos, whom Shanahan previously coached from 1995 to 2008, nearly re-hired him as head coach in 2018 before their decision to retain Vance Joseph on January 1, 2018.

== Head coaching record ==
Team	Year	Regular season					Postseason			
Team	Year	Won	Lost	Ties	Win %	Finish	Won	Lost	Win %	Result
LAR	1988	7	9	0	.438	3rd in AFC West	–	–	–	–
LAR	1989	1	3	0	.250	Fired	–	–	–	–
LAR Total		8	12	0	.400		-	-	-	
DEN	1995	8	8	0	.500	3rd in AFC West	–	–	–	–
DEN	1996	13	3	0	.813	1st in AFC West	0	1	.000	Lost to Jacksonville Jaguars in AFC Divisional Game
DEN	1997	12	4	0	.750	2nd in AFC West	4	0	1.000	Super Bowl XXXII Champions
DEN	1998	14	2	0	.875	1st in AFC West	3	0	1.000	Super Bowl XXXIII Champions
DEN	1999	6	10	0	.375	5th in AFC West	–	–	–	–
DEN	2000	11	5	0	.688	2nd in AFC West	0	1	.000	Lost to Baltimore Ravens in AFC wild card game
DEN	2001	8	8	0	.500	3rd in AFC West	–	–	–	–
DEN	2002	9	7	0	.563	2nd in AFC West	–	–	–	–
DEN	2003	10	6	0	.625	2nd in AFC West	0	1	.000	Lost to Indianapolis Colts in AFC Wild Card Game
DEN	2004	10	6	0	.625	2nd in AFC West	0	1	.000	Lost to Indianapolis Colts in AFC Wild Card Game
DEN	2005	13	3	0	.813	1st in AFC West	1	1	.500	Lost to Pittsburgh Steelers in AFC Championship Game
DEN	2006	9	7	0	.563	3rd in AFC West	–	–	–	–
DEN	2007	7	9	0	.438	2nd in AFC West	–	–	–	–
DEN	2008	8	8	0	.500	2nd in AFC West	–	–	–	–
DEN Total		138	86	0	.616		8	5	.615	
WAS	2010	6	10	0	.375	4th in NFC East	–	–	–	–
WAS	2011	5	11	0	.313	4th in NFC East	–	–	–	–
WAS	2012	10	6	0	.625	1st in NFC East	0	1	.000	Lost to Seattle Seahawks in NFC Wild Card Game
WAS	2013	3	13	0	.188	4th in NFC East	–	–	–	–
WAS Total		24	40	0	.375		0	1	.000	
Total		170	138	0	.552		8	6	.571	

== Accomplishments ==
- Posted the most wins in National Football League history during a three-year period at the time (46 in 1996–98).
- Won the most postseason games in history over a two-year period (seven, 1997–98).
- Been undefeated and untied for three consecutive regular seasons (1996–98) at home, just the second team ever to be undefeated and untied at home in three consecutive years. The Miami Dolphins posted three consecutive seasons of untied undefeated home records from 1972 to 1974. Including playoff games, the Dolphins had won 31 consecutive home games from 1971 to 1974. Oddly enough, in 1999 on the opening Monday Night Football game, the Dolphins ended the defending Super Bowl champion Denver Broncos streak with a 38–21 win in Denver.
- In 2004, he joined the exclusive club of head coaches to post 100 wins in his first 10 seasons with one club, finishing the campaign and decade tied for fourth on this list of 12 coaches, six of whom are enshrined in the Pro Football Hall of Fame.
- Joins Vince Lombardi, Don Shula, Chuck Noll, Jimmy Johnson, Bill Belichick, and Andy Reid as the only seven coaches to win back-to-back Super Bowls.
- He is the second coach in history to win two Super Bowl titles in his first four years coaching a team (Shula did it first with the Miami Dolphins in 1972 and 1973).
- Highest winning percentage in Denver history (.646) and most wins in Denver history (138).
- Shanahan is among twelve coaches in pro football history to post four wins in one postseason along with Tom Flores, Joe Gibbs, Brian Billick, Bill Cowher, Tony Dungy, Tom Coughlin (twice), Mike McCarthy, John Harbaugh, Bruce Arians, Sean McVay, Andy Reid, and most recently, Nick Sirianni.
- The all-time high of 636 points in a season came from the 1994 Super Bowl Champion San Francisco 49ers, for whom Shanahan was the offensive coordinator. This was eclipsed during the 2007 season when the New England Patriots scored 589 points in the regular season and 66 points in the postseason for a total of 655 points. Ironically, that record was again broken in the 2013–2014 season when Shanahan's former team, the Denver Broncos, scored 606 points in the regular season and 58 in the postseason for a total of 664 points.
- During his NFL career, Shanahan has been a part of teams that have played in 10 Conference Championship Games, in addition to his five Super Bowl appearances, Super Bowl XXI, Super Bowl XXII, Super Bowl XXXII, and Super Bowl XXXIII with Denver and Super Bowl XXIX with San Francisco.

== Coaching tree ==
Shanahan has worked under six head coaches:

- Barry Switzer, Oklahoma (1975)
- Joe Salem, Northern Arizona (1976–1977), Minnesota (1979)
- Darrell Mudra, Eastern Illinois (1978)
- Charley Pell, Florida (1980–1983)
- Dan Reeves, Denver Broncos (1984–1987, 1990–1991)
- George Seifert, San Francisco 49ers (1992–1994)

Sixteen of Shanahan's assistant coaches became head coaches in the NFL or NCAA:

- Art Shell, Los Angeles Raiders (1989–1994), Oakland Raiders (2006)
- Karl Dorrell, UCLA (2003–2007), Colorado (2020–2022)
- J. D. Brookhart, Akron (2004–2009)
- Greg Robinson, Syracuse (2005–2008)
- Gary Kubiak, Houston Texans (2006–2013), Denver Broncos (2015–2016)
- Tim Brewster, Minnesota (2007–2010)
- Troy Calhoun, Air Force (2007–present)
- Jon Embree, Colorado (2011–2012)
- Anthony Lynn, Buffalo Bills (2016, interim), Los Angeles Chargers (2017–2020)
- Sean McVay, Los Angeles Rams (2017–present)
- Kyle Shanahan, San Francisco 49ers (2017–present)
- Jedd Fisch, UCLA (2017, interim), Arizona (2021–2023), Washington (2024–present)
- Charlie Jackson, Kentucky State (2019–2021)
- Matt LaFleur, Green Bay Packers (2019–present)
- Lou Spanos, UConn (2021, interim)
- Mike McDaniel, Miami Dolphins (2022–2026)
- Raheem Morris, Atlanta Falcons (2024–2025)

Three of Shanahan's former players became head coaches in the NFL or NCAA:

- Anthony Lynn, Buffalo Bills (2016, interim), Los Angeles Chargers (2017–2020)
- Kliff Kingsbury, Texas Tech (2013–2018), Arizona Cardinals (2019–2022)
- Ed McCaffrey, Northern Colorado (2020-2022)

Five of Shanahan's executives/former players became general managers in the NFL:

- Rick Smith, Houston Texans (2006–2017)
- John Elway, Denver Broncos (2011–2020)
- Reggie McKenzie, Oakland Raiders (2012–2018)
- Dave Gettleman, Carolina Panthers (2013–2017), New York Giants (2018–2021)
- John Lynch, San Francisco 49ers (2017–present)

== Personal life ==
Shanahan is a Catholic. He and his wife, Peggy, have two children — a son, Kyle, the current San Francisco 49ers' head coach, and a daughter, Krystal. Shanahan is also a brother in the Delta Sigma Phi fraternity.

In May 2008, Shanahan attended the wedding of George W. Bush's daughter Jenna Bush, who was the former college roommate of Shanahan's daughter.

In July 2016, Shanahan hosted a fundraiser for Republican presidential candidate Donald Trump in Loveland, Colorado. In October 2016, Shanahan introduced Trump at a campaign rally in Denver.

In October 2021, Shanahan sold his mansion in Cherry Hills Village, Colorado (near Denver) for a record $15.7 million.

== See also ==
- List of National Football League head coaches with 50 wins
- List of Super Bowl head coaches
