= Mike Macdonald =

American football coach (born 1987)

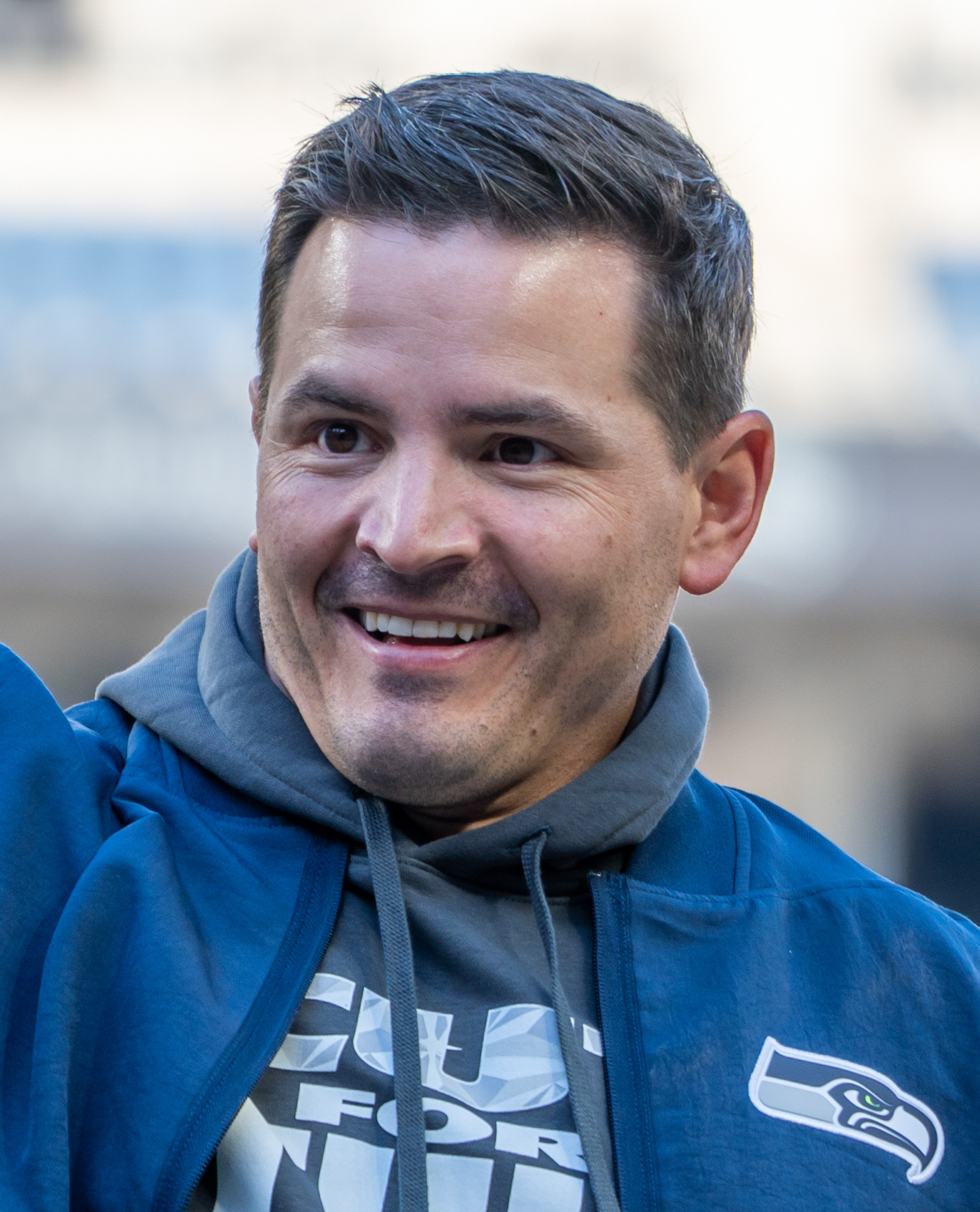
- Macdonald in 2026

Seattle Seahawks
- Title: Head coach

Personal information
- Born: June 26, 1987 (age 39); Scituate, Massachusetts, U.S.

Career information
- High school: Centennial (Roswell, Georgia)
- College: Georgia

Career history
- Cedar Shoals HS (GA) (2008–2009) Linebackers coach & running backs coach; Georgia (2010–2013); Graduate assistant (2010); Defensive quality control assistant (2011–2013); Baltimore Ravens (2014–2020); Coaching intern (2014); Defensive assistant (2015–2016); Defensive backs coach (2017); Linebackers coach (2018–2020); Michigan (2021) Defensive coordinator; Baltimore Ravens (2022–2023) Defensive coordinator; Seattle Seahawks (2024–present) Head coach

Awards and highlights
- Super Bowl champion (LX)

Head coaching record
- Regular season: 30–14 (.682)
- Postseason: 3–0 (1.000)
- Career: 33–14 (.702)
- Coaching profile at Pro Football Reference

Michael Macdonald (born June 26, 1987) is an American professional football coach who is the head coach for the Seattle Seahawks of the National Football League (NFL). He began his career with the Baltimore Ravens in 2014, serving as a defensive assistant. In 2021, Macdonald left the Ravens to become the defensive coordinator of the Michigan Wolverines. He rejoined the Ravens a year later as their defensive coordinator, a position he held from 2022 to 2023. Macdonald was named the head coach of the Seahawks in 2024 and led them to a victory in Super Bowl LX over his hometown New England Patriots in his second year.

== Early life ==
Macdonald was born on June 26, 1987, in Boston, Massachusetts, and grew up a fan of the New England Patriots. He attended Centennial High School in Roswell, Georgia, where he played baseball and football at Centennial. Macdonald played linebacker and fullback for the Knights, but frequently suffered stingers and eventually tore his ACL while practicing for what would have been his last high school game.

Macdonald attended the University of Georgia, where he studied finance at the Terry College of Business and graduated summa cum laude in 2010. Macdonald is a member of Sigma Phi Epsilon and, while a student at Georgia, he coached high school football at Cedar Shoals High School in Athens, Georgia.

== Coaching career ==
=== Georgia ===
In May 2010, Macdonald joined Mark Richt's coaching staff as a graduate assistant with the Georgia Bulldogs football program. He also served as a safeties and defensive quality control coach at Georgia from 2011 to 2013. In 2013, while coaching at Georgia, Macdonald earned a master's degree in sport management from the Mary Frances Early College of Education at the University of Georgia.

=== Baltimore Ravens ===
Macdonald served on John Harbaugh's coaching staff with the Baltimore Ravens for seven seasons from 2014 to 2020. He was hired as an intern in 2014 and was promoted to defensive assistant in January 2015, defensive backs coach in January 2017, and linebackers coach in January 2018.

=== Michigan ===
In January 2021, Macdonald joined Jim Harbaugh's staff at Michigan as the defensive coordinator. In Macdonald's lone season at Michigan, the Wolverines posted a top-10 national defense, went undefeated at home, won the Big Ten Conference Championship, and played in the College Football Playoff. The team finished with a national ranking of No. 3 and a final record of 12–2.

=== Baltimore Ravens (second stint) ===
On January 27, 2022, Macdonald was re-hired by the Ravens as their defensive coordinator under head coach John Harbaugh, replacing Don Martindale. In 2022, Macdonald led the Ravens' defense to only allowing 315 points in 17 games. Averaging just under 19 points per game, the Ravens' defense was ranked the fourth best defense in the league.

In 2023, the Ravens' defensive unit improved under Macdonald as they only allowed 280 points in total on the season, the fewest in the NFL. The Ravens would advance to the AFC Championship Game, and despite losing to the eventual Super Bowl champions, the Kansas City Chiefs, the Ravens held the Chiefs to just 17 points, marking the team's sixth consecutive game where they held an opponent to 20 points or less.

=== Seattle Seahawks (2024–present) ===
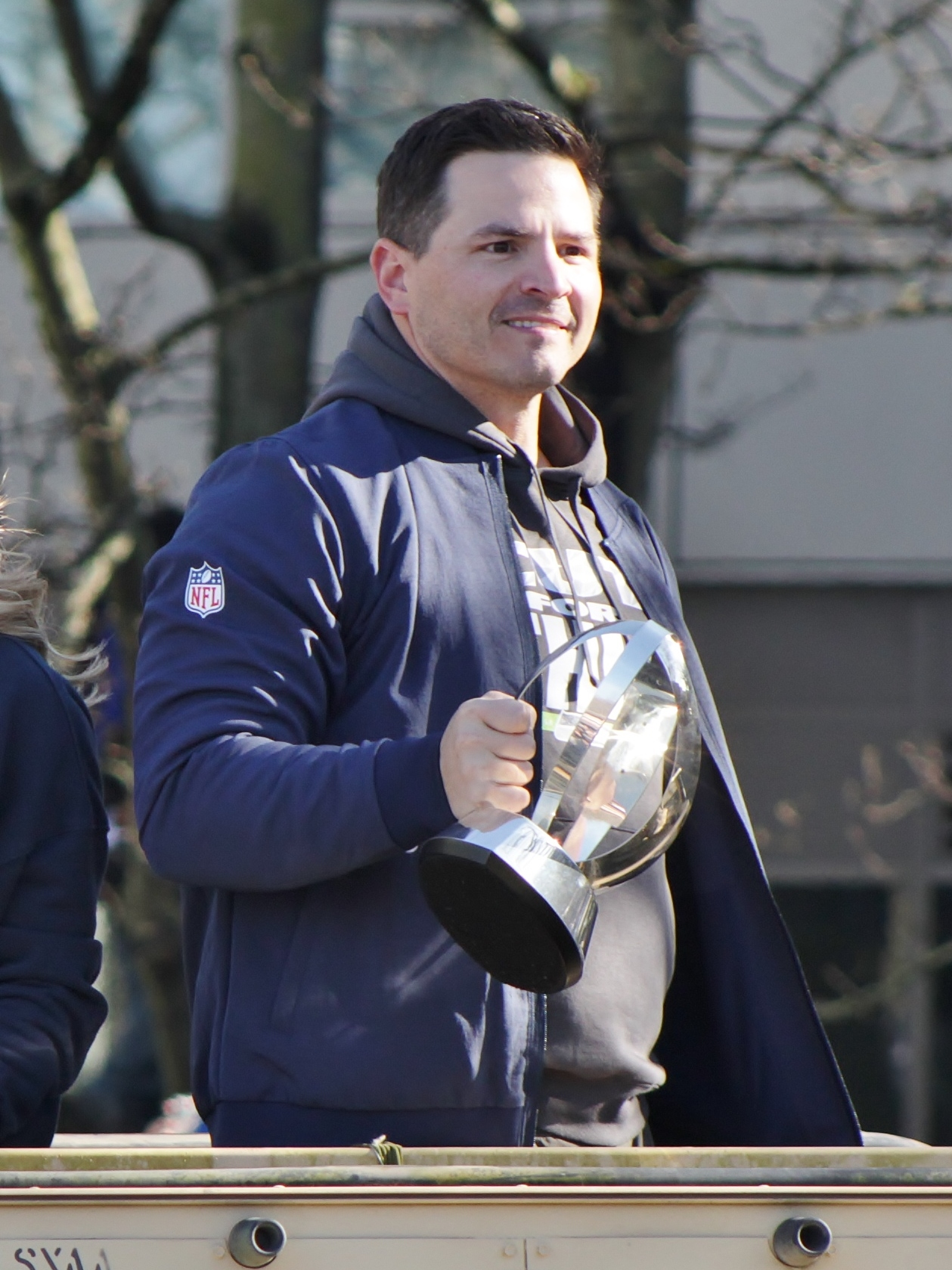
Macdonald with the George Halas Trophy at the Seahawks Super Bowl LX parade in 2026

On January 31, 2024, Macdonald was hired by the Seattle Seahawks as their head coach to replace Pete Carroll. He beat out Ejiro Evero, Patrick Graham, Ben Johnson, Mike Kafka, Raheem Morris, Dan Quinn, Bobby Slowik, and Frank Smith for the job. At the time of his hiring, Macdonald was the youngest head coach in the NFL. At his introductory press conference, Macdonald said he initially intended to retain defensive playcalling duties, but would relinquish them "when it becomes obvious that someone else is ready to go and we see it the same way."

Macdonald began his inaugural season with Seattle by leading the team to three straight victories for the first time since 2020. The team followed this start by going on a three-game losing streak. By the Seahawks' Week 10 bye, the team held a record of 4–5, falling to last place in the NFC West. The team improved to 5–5 in Week 11 when they defeated the reigning NFC champions and division rivals, the San Francisco 49ers on the road 20–17. In Week 18, Macdonald led the team to a 30–25 victory against the division rival Los Angeles Rams on route to his 10th coaching win in his first season, becoming the first head coach in franchise history to reach 10 wins in his inaugural season. The Seahawks finished with a 10–7 record but missed the postseason in Macdonald's first season as head coach.

In his second season after a Week 4 road victory over the Arizona Cardinals, Macdonald became the fifth head coach in NFL history to win nine of his first 10 road games. His 10 consecutive road victories also stand as the longest streak in franchise history.

After defeating the San Francisco 49ers by a score of 13–3 in Week 18 and holding Kyle Shanahan to the lowest offensive point and yardage total of his coaching career, the Seahawks finished the regular season at 14–3, setting a franchise record for wins in a season and winning the NFC West and finishing as #1 seed in the NFC.

At the end of the regular season, Macdonald was named a finalist for the AP NFL Coach of the Year award alongside Liam Coen, Ben Johnson, Kyle Shanahan, and Mike Vrabel; Vrabel eventually won.

During the 2025 season, Macdonald's defense, who had named themselves "the Dark Side," allowed just 292 points (17.2 per game), the fewest in the league. That figure contributed to a league-best and franchise record +191 regular-season point differential; the defense was also ranked the best in the league by DVOA.

Macdonald won the first playoff game of his career when the Seahawks defeated the 49ers in a rematch in the divisional round by a score of 41–6. In the NFC Championship, the Seahawks won 31–27 against the Los Angeles Rams, thus qualifying for Super Bowl LX. In Super Bowl LX, the Seahawks defeated the New England Patriots 29–13, giving Macdonald his first Super Bowl win as a coach and the second title overall for the Seahawks franchise. He also became the first head coach in NFL history to win the Super Bowl while calling the defensive plays. At age 38, Macdonald became the third-youngest head coach to win a Super Bowl, behind Sean McVay and Mike Tomlin.

== Defensive philosophy ==
Macdonald describes his system as hinging on "adjustable" concepts, allowing his defense to "layer it together;" media have described these principles as "multiplicity." He is noted for his use of disguise: he installs his system in such a way that his pass rushers must know and be able to perform each other’s responsibilities, allowing them to generate the same pressure from multiple positions on the line and making it difficult for offenses to anticipate pressure solely based on alignment. He also disguises his coverage by rotating his safeties late after the snap, which quarterback Kirk Cousins likened to "facing two coverages on a play." Although simulated pressures are sometimes identified with his system, Macdonald himself says "we do not run a lot of simulated pressures."

Because of its emphasis on the ability to execute multiple responsibilities from the same position, Macdonald’s system values positional versatility. Players noted for their ability to fulfill multiple roles under Macdonald include Kyle Hamilton, Devon Witherspoon and Nick Emmanwori in the secondary, as well as Leonard Williams playing at multiple positions along the defensive line. While oftentimes personnel packages using extra defensive backs, such as nickel and dime, indicate that a team is sacrificing run defense in favor of having additional personnel in the secondary to defend the pass, Macdonald says the versatility of players like Hamilton and Emmanwori allows him to remain in those packages without such a compromise. Prior to Super Bowl LX, Macdonald told reporters that because of Emmanwori’s flexibility, "when we go to dime, we’re really a nickel 4-3 team;" he had earlier said that both Emmanwori and Hamilton possessed the ability to "affect the game that way kind of at the second level while training at the third level." In part because of flexible personnel, Macdonald’s Ravens and Seahawks defenses played sub packages, such as nickel and dime, at some of the highest rates in the league.

The unpredictability of his pass rush and the stoutness of his backfield allows Macdonald to consistently generate pressure without blitzing; under him, both the Ravens and the Seahawks were noted for successfully generating pressures while recording some of the league’s lowest blitz rates.

Commenters have drawn parallels between the offensive scheme of Los Angeles Rams head coach Sean McVay and Macdonald's defensive system, noting that both units seek to confuse their opponents with the ability to run multiple concepts from the same alignment or vice versa. For both this and his youth (being 36 years old when hired by Seattle) Macdonald has drawn favorable comparisons to McVay.

== Head coaching record ==
| Team | Year | Regular season | | | | | Postseason | | | |
| Team | Year | Won | Lost | Ties | Win % | Finish | Won | Lost | Win % | Result |
|---|---|---|---|---|---|---|---|---|---|---|
| SEA | 2024 | 10 | 7 | 0 | .588 | 2nd in NFC West | — | — | — | — |
| SEA | 2025 | 14 | 3 | 0 | .824 | 1st in NFC West | 3 | 0 | 1.000 | Super Bowl LX champions |
| SEA | 2026 | 5 | 4 | 0 | .556 | TBD in NFC West | — | — | — | — |
| Total | | 29 | 14 | 0 | .674 | | 3 | 0 | 1.000 | |

== Coaching tree ==
The following coaches have worked under Macdonald who went on to become head coaches:

- Klint Kubiak, Las Vegas Raiders (2026–present)

== Personal life ==
Macdonald is a Christian. He and his wife, Stephanie, have been married since 2021. They have a son.
