= Zone run =

American football play

The zone run in American football is a running play based on zone blocking.

== Play description ==
Zone running actually has many different variations; an inside zone play or an outside zone play also sometimes wrongly labeled as the stretch (which is in fact a different play). The difference between the three popular zone plays are the aiming point and reads for the ball carrier. While the inside zone has its first landmark around the guards original position, the outside zone aims at the off-tackle area. The stretch usually reads the force defender outside.

Zone blocking originates with blocking the first level (defensive line). There are usually two double teams on every zone blocking play (playside and weakside). From each double team, one of the lineman from each will work onto the next level (linebackers). Depending on the flow of the linebackers, either the drive man (inside blocker of double team) or the post man (outside man of the double team) will leave the double team in order to reach the linebacker. If the linebacker reads over the top of the double team (outside) then the post man leaves the double team in order to block the flowing linebacker. If the linebacker comes inside the double team (underneath), the drive/inside double teamer will pick up the backer. This blocking scheme creates cut-back lanes, open pockets of space through which the running back can run. Cut-back lanes are created due to an overcommitment (flow) by the defense and a seal block on the backside by linemen.

Where most plays are designed to go to a specific hole or gap along the offensive line, a zone run requires the running back to read the blocks in front of him and choose the best crease to enter. In theory this allows the offensive lineman to block the defensive linemen in whatever direction is most convenient, assuming a hole will be available somewhere.

== Users ==
Most NFL and Division I NCAA football teams that rely on running the ball now use zone blocking schemes. The zone run has been made popular in the NFL and Division 1 because of advanced defenses, lateral speed of defensive players, and athleticism of offensive linemen and running backs.

=== History ===
The concept of zone blocking in both the run and pass game was created by Iowa coach Kirk Ferentz. However, this blocking scheme came to prominence in the modern game when used by the Denver Broncos, under offensive line coach Alex Gibbs (formerly the offensive line coach for the Seattle Seahawks), and head coach Mike Shanahan.
