= Sean McVay =

American football coach (born 1986)

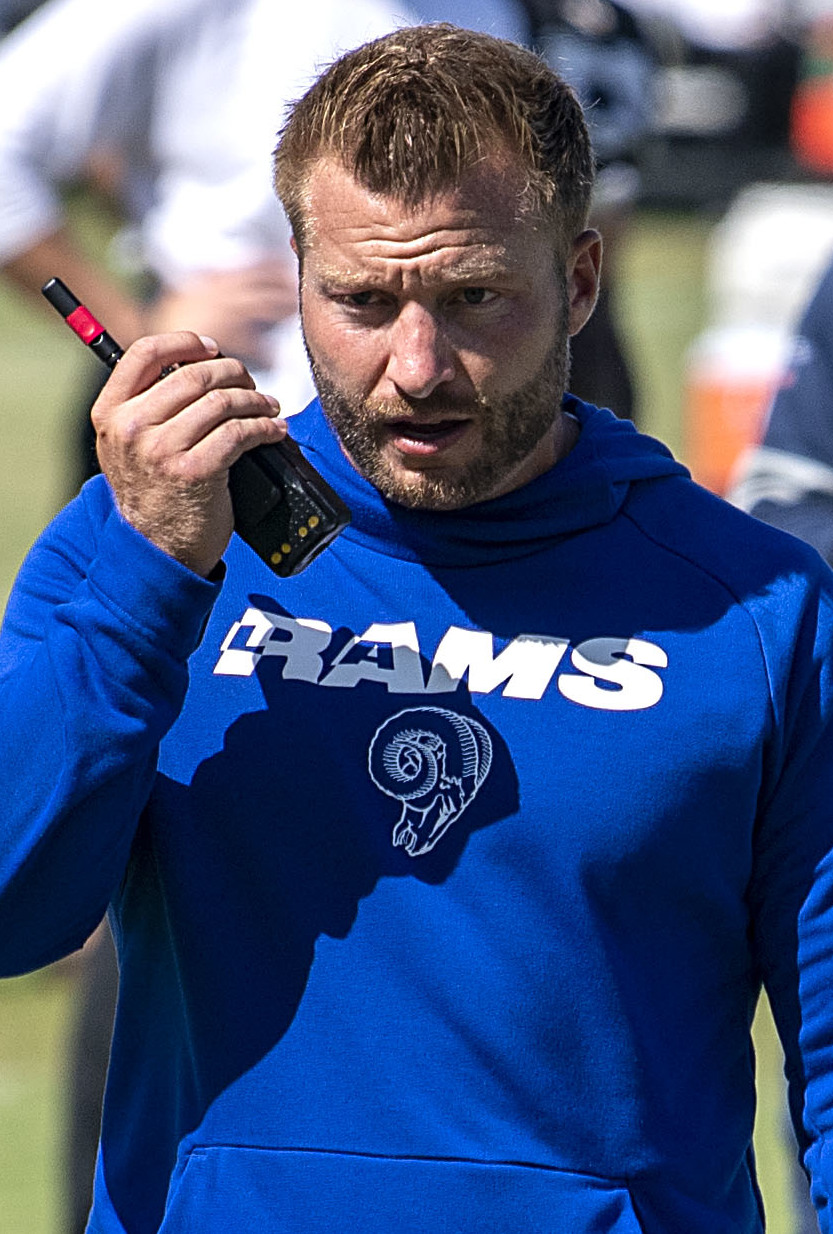
- McVay with the Los Angeles Rams in 2019

Los Angeles Rams
- Title: Head coach

Personal information
- Born: January 24, 1986 (age 40); Dayton, Ohio, U.S.

Career information
- Position: Wide receiver
- High school: Marist (Brookhaven, Georgia)
- College: Miami (OH) (2004–2008)

Career history
- Tampa Bay Buccaneers (2008) Offensive assistant; Florida Tuskers (2009) Wide receivers coach; Washington Redskins (2010–2016); Offensive assistant (2010); Tight ends coach (2011–2013); Offensive coordinator (2014–2016); Los Angeles Rams (2017–present) Head coach

Awards and highlights
- Super Bowl champion (LVI); AP NFL Coach of the Year (2017); NFL records: Youngest head coach hired in NFL history: 30; Youngest head coach to reach the Super Bowl: 33; Youngest head coach to win the Super Bowl: 36

Head coaching record
- Regular season: 97–61 (.614)
- Postseason: 10–6 (.625)
- Career: 107–67 (.615)
- Coaching profile at Pro Football Reference

Sean Patrick McVay (born January 24, 1986) is an American professional football coach who is the head coach for the Los Angeles Rams of the National Football League (NFL). He became the youngest NFL head coach in the modern era when he was hired by the Rams in 2017 at the age of 30 years and 353 days. McVay is also the youngest head coach to reach and win a Super Bowl as well as be named NFL Coach of the Year. Prior to his tenure in Los Angeles, McVay worked with the Tampa Bay Buccaneers as an offensive assistant, the Florida Tuskers as the wide receivers coach, and the Washington Redskins as an offensive assistant, the tight ends coach, and the offensive coordinator.

Within his first year, McVay turned a Rams team that had the league's lowest scoring offense the previous year into the top-scoring team of 2017. The season also marked the Rams' first winning record and division title since 2003 and first playoff appearance since 2004. Over the following seasons, McVay led the Rams to an appearance in Super Bowl LIII in 2019, a victory in Super Bowl LVI in 2022, the franchise's first championship since 1999, and became the winningest head coach in Rams' history in 2024. His success in Los Angeles is credited with spawning the "Sean McVay effect", in which NFL teams were more inclined to hire younger, offensive-minded head coaches.

== Early life and family ==
Sean Patrick McVay was born on January 24, 1986, in Dayton, Ohio, the son of Tim and Cindy McVay. Tim played football as a defensive back at Indiana University, where he was a two-time team captain. Tim and Cindy met when they were both students at Indiana, and they got married in 1981. Tim embarked on a successful career spanning four decades as a television executive for Cox Communications, and Cindy became an interior designer. The McVay family lived in Dayton until Sean was six years old, and they eventually settled in the Atlanta, Georgia, area.

Sean's paternal grandfather, John, was a longtime football coach at the high school, college, and professional levels. Most notably, he was the head coach for the University of Dayton, the Memphis Southmen of the World Football League, and the NFL's New York Giants, before transitioning into front office roles. John served as an executive for the San Francisco 49ers between 1980 and 1999, winning the NFL's Executive of the Year award for the team's successful 1989 season.

=== High school football ===
McVay attended and graduated from Marist School in Brookhaven, Georgia in 2004. He was a four-year starter at Marist as a quarterback and safety for the War Eagles high school football team and the first player in school history to amass 1,000 yards rushing and passing in consecutive seasons. McVay totaled 2,600 yards rushing and 40 rushing touchdowns during his career and also passed for 2,500 yards and 18 touchdowns, leading the War Eagles to a 26–3 record, including a 14–1 record and state championship his senior year, when McVay was also named the Georgia 4A Offensive Player of the Year over future NFL Hall of Fame wide receiver Calvin Johnson.

== College career ==
McVay attended Miami University in Oxford, Ohio, where he played college football as a wide receiver from 2005 to 2007, earning Miami's Scholar-Athlete Award in 2007. Playing in 26 games over three seasons, McVay recorded 39 receptions for 312 yards for the RedHawks in his college career. He graduated from Miami in 2008 with a B.S. in Health and Sports Studies.

=== College statistics ===
Year	Team	Receiving				Rushing			
Year	Team	Rec	Yds	Avg	TD	Att	Yds	Avg	TD
2005	Miami (OH)	1	6	6.0	0	1	2	2.0	0
2006	Miami (OH)	20	198	9.9	0	5	4	0.8	0
2007	Miami (OH)	18	108	6.0	0	3	23	7.7	0
Career		39	312	8.0	0	9	29	3.2	0

== Coaching career ==
=== Early years ===
McVay began his coaching career as an assistant wide receivers coach with the Tampa Bay Buccaneers in 2008 under head coach Jon Gruden. The next year, McVay was the quality control/wide receivers coach for the Florida Tuskers of the United Football League (UFL). With Florida, McVay first worked under Jay Gruden, who was the Tuskers offensive coordinator.

=== Washington Redskins (2010–2016) ===
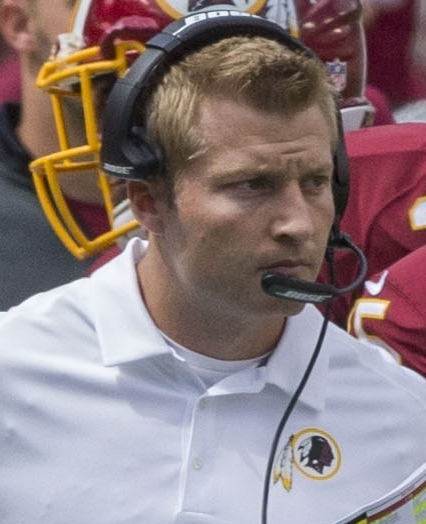
McVay in 2014

In 2010, McVay was hired as the assistant tight ends coach for the Washington Redskins under head coach Mike Shanahan. The following season, McVay was promoted to tight ends coach, a position he held through the 2013 season. During these years, McVay coached multiple tights ends such as Chris Cooley, Fred Davis, Logan Paulsen, and Jordan Reed.

On January 14, 2014, McVay was promoted to offensive coordinator by new head coach Jay Gruden. He would succeed his future NFC West coaching rival Kyle Shanahan in that role. Over the next three seasons, McVay had a direct impact in developing Kirk Cousins into a franchise quarterback. Becoming the full-time starter in 2015, Cousins led the Redskins to back-to-back winning seasons, throwing for over 9,000 yards and more than 50 touchdowns under McVay's direction. In 2016, Cousins was named to the Pro Bowl for the first time. McVay's success with Cousins made him an attractive head coaching candidate and following the season, McVay was interviewed by both the Los Angeles Rams and the San Francisco 49ers.

=== Los Angeles Rams (2017–present) ===
==== 2017 season: NFL Coach of the Year ====
On January 12, 2017, McVay was hired by owner Stan Kroenke to become the 28th head coach of the Los Angeles Rams at the age of 30 years, 354 days. The hiring made McVay the youngest head coach in the NFL's modern era, surpassing Lane Kiffin, who was 31 years, 259 days old when hired by the Oakland Raiders in 2007, and the youngest since 27-year-old Art Lewis became interim head coach of the then-Cleveland Rams in 1938. McVay would remain the youngest head coach in the NFL until the New England Patriots hired Jerod Mayo on January 12, 2024, exactly seven years to the day after McVay was hired by the Rams.

McVay inherited a Rams team that finished 2016 in last place in points, total yards, touchdown passes and first downs, a team later ranked as having the second-worst offense of the decade based on Football Outsiders' DVOA (Defense-adjusted Value Over Average) statistic. On January 19, 2017, veteran coach Wade Phillips was hired by McVay as defensive coordinator. On February 8, McVay hired Matt LaFleur as his offensive coordinator. LaFleur had previously worked with McVay in Washington when McVay was tight ends coach and LaFleur was quarterbacks coach.

Following a 2–2 preseason, on September 10, 2017, McVay made his regular-season head coaching debut against the Indianapolis Colts and led the Rams to a 46–9 victory in a home game at the Los Angeles Memorial Coliseum. After a 27–20 loss in Week 2 to McVay's former team, the Washington Redskins, the Rams pulled off a narrow 41–39 road victory over the San Francisco 49ers on Thursday Night Football. During Week 4, the Rams turned a 16–24 deficit into a 35–30 upset road victory over the Dallas Cowboys, but they lost their next game to their NFC West division rival Seattle Seahawks at home by a score of 16–10. Regardless, in just five games, the Rams scored a total of 152 points, a dramatic and immediate improvement (Los Angeles had only scored 82 total points through its first five games in 2016). They went on to beat the Jacksonville Jaguars on the road by a score of 27–17 in Week 6 and the Arizona Cardinals by a score of 33–0 in an NFL International Series game at London's Twickenham Stadium for the team's first shutout win since 2014, as well as raising their record to 5–2 for the first time since 2004 (the last time the team made the playoffs) and a first-place lead in the NFC West. McVay coached the Rams to a blowout victory against the New York Giants in their highest-scoring game, a 51–17 road rout that raised the Rams' record to 6–2. The Rams would win another home game against the Houston Texans by a score of 33–7 to raise their record to 7–2, the team's best start since 2001.

In Weeks 11 and 12, the Rams lost to the Minnesota Vikings on the road by a score of 24–7 but won at home against the New Orleans Saints 26–20 to raise their record to 8–3. With a 32–16 road victory over the Cardinals in Week 13, the Rams achieved their first winning season since 2003. Although they lost to the Philadelphia Eagles 43–35 at home in Week 14, the Rams had two victories in Week 15 and Week 16. Running back Todd Gurley had 456 yards in total offense with six touchdowns to lead Los Angeles in back-to-back wins on the road over the Seattle Seahawks 42–7 and then the Tennessee Titans 27–23 road victory, the latter of which secured for the Rams the NFC West title. McVay's first season with the Rams saw them dramatically improve their record from the 2016 season, finishing with the team's first winning season and division title since 2003 and its first playoff berth since 2004. In the process, Los Angeles became the first team to have the top scoring offense in the league a year after finishing with the lowest scoring offense.

McVay made his playoff head coaching debut against the Atlanta Falcons, but the Rams lost at home in the Wild Card Round by a score of 26–13. On January 19, 2018, at the 7th NFL Honors in Minneapolis, he was named NFL Coach of the Year by the Associated Press, having received 35 out of 50 votes.

==== 2018 season: Super Bowl LIII run ====
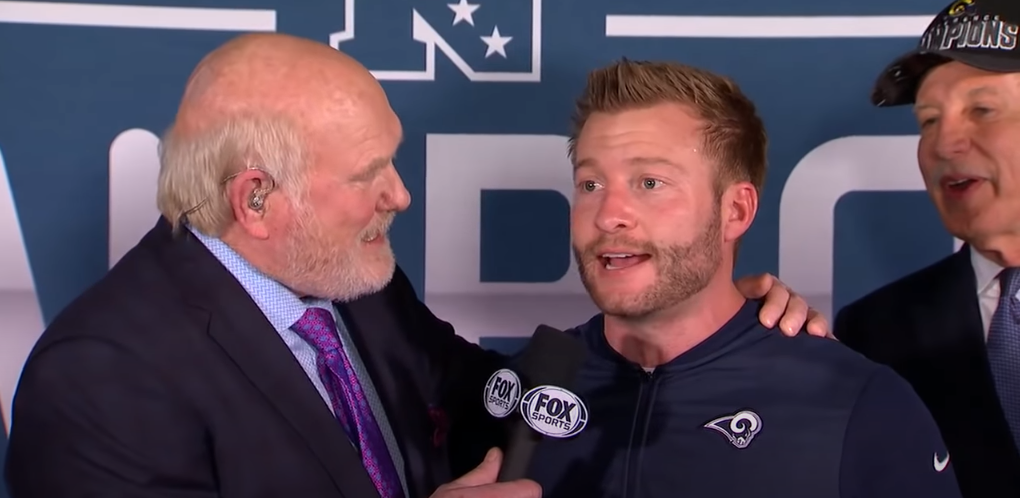
McVay interviewed by Terry Bradshaw after winning the NFC Championship

After offensive coordinator Matt LaFleur left his position with the Rams on January 30, 2018, to move up to play caller as offensive coordinator for the Tennessee Titans, McVay elected not to name a replacement, continuing to call plays and taking on full responsibility for the offense.

The Rams started the season 8–0, their best start to a season since 1969, but they lost in New Orleans to the New Orleans Saints in Week 9 by a score of 45–35 to fall to 8–1. After defeating the Seattle Seahawks 36–31 in Week 10, the Rams beat the Kansas City Chiefs by a score of 54–51 in Week 11 on Monday Night Football in a highly anticipated matchup that was originally scheduled to be played in Mexico City, but was shifted to Los Angeles due to poor field conditions.

Following a bye week, the Rams traveled to Detroit and defeated the Detroit Lions by a score of 30–16 to clinch their second straight NFC West title. McVay then endured his first losing streak as a head coach as the Rams stumbled in back-to-back losses to the Chicago Bears (15–6) and the Philadelphia Eagles (30–23), both on NBC Sunday Night Football. The Rams bounced back to defeat the Arizona Cardinals 31–9 and San Francisco 49ers 48–32 in the final two weeks to finish the regular season with a 13–3 record, tied for the second-most wins in franchise history.

In the Divisional Round, the Rams defeated the Dallas Cowboys by a score of 30–22. During the controversial NFC Championship Game, the Rams beat the Saints on the road by a score of 26–23 on a game-winning field goal by Greg Zuerlein in overtime to send the Rams to Super Bowl LIII, their first NFL championship appearance since Super Bowl XXXVI in 2002. It was also the Rams' first Super Bowl appearance while based in Los Angeles since Super Bowl XIV in 1980. At age 33, McVay became the youngest head coach to lead his team to the Super Bowl. However, the success would be short-lived, as the Rams would fall to Tom Brady and the New England Patriots, with the Rams failing to score a single touchdown in the 13–3 loss (the lowest-scoring Super Bowl in history).

==== 2019 season ====
The 2019 season was a disappointment, as the Rams were victims of the Super Bowl Losers' Curse and missed the playoffs with a 9–7 record. The Rams started the season 3–0, winning against the Carolina Panthers, New Orleans Saints, and Cleveland Browns. However, they then lost three straight to the Tampa Bay Buccaneers, Seattle Seahawks, and San Francisco 49ers. Before a Week 9 bye, they won two games against the Atlanta Falcons and Cincinnati Bengals. The Rams then won four and lost four. The team faced problems during the season due to a combination of factors and lost in heartbreaking fashion on the road by a score of 34–31 against the 49ers, which eliminated the Rams from the playoffs. Los Angeles finished the season at 9–7 with a season-ending 31–24 victory over the Arizona Cardinals in the team's final game at the Los Angeles Memorial Coliseum.

==== 2020 season ====
After a victory over the Dallas Cowboys in the season opener, the Rams started off the first half of the 2020 season going 5–3, with wins over the Philadelphia Eagles, New York Giants, Washington Football Team, and Chicago Bears. However, they lost to the Buffalo Bills, San Francisco 49ers, and Miami Dolphins. The Rams finished the season with a 10–6 record with wins over the Seattle Seahawks, Tampa Bay Buccaneers, Arizona Cardinals, and New England Patriots. Their remaining losses came against the New York Jets, 49ers, and Seahawks.

After a 30–20 road victory over the Seahawks in the Wild Card Round, McVay and the Rams visited the #1-seed Green Bay Packers at Lambeau Field, who were led by one of McVay's former offensive coordinators, Matt LaFleur. The matchup was the postseason contest with the youngest combined age between both head coaches in over 50 years. The Rams lost by a score of 32–18 in the Divisional Round.

==== 2021 season: Super Bowl LVI victory ====
There were high expectations for the Rams after trading for former Detroit Lions quarterback Matthew Stafford in the offseason. The Rams opened the season at home against the Chicago Bears and won 34–14. They then won their next two games against the Indianapolis Colts, and the reigning Super Bowl champion Tampa Bay Buccaneers before losing to the Arizona Cardinals. The Rams then beat the Seattle Seahawks on Thursday Night Football 26–17, then defeated the New York Giants on the road by a score of 38–11 the following week. Wins at home against the Detroit Lions (28–19) and on the road against Houston Texans (38–22) pushed the Rams' record to 7–1.

However, the Rams stumbled as they passed the midway point of the season, losing 28–16 to the visiting Tennessee Titans during Week 9 on Sunday Night Football, then getting routed 31–10 by the host San Francisco 49ers on Monday Night Football in Week 10. After a Week 11 bye, the Rams' losing streak continued when they lost to the Green Bay Packers on the road by a score of 36–28, falling to a 7–4 record. The Rams snapped their losing streak with a 37–7 blowout at home against the Jacksonville Jaguars, then followed that up with an impressive 30–23 road victory over the Cardinals, which vaulted the Rams back into the NFC West race. Despite a two-day delay due to COVID-19 precautions, the Rams beat the Seahawks 20–10 at SoFi Stadium to improve to 10–4, then scored impressive road wins over the Minnesota Vikings (30–23) and the Baltimore Ravens (20–19) to clinch an NFC playoff spot. However, the regular-season ended with a 27–24 overtime loss to the 49ers, in which the Rams squandered a 17–0 lead. Despite the loss, the Rams' first under McVay after they had led at halftime (a streak of 45 straight games), the Rams claimed the NFC West division title by virtue of Arizona's loss to Seattle that same day.

In the first NFL playoff game played on Monday Night Football, the Rams defeated their NFC West rival, the Arizona Cardinals, by a score of 34–11. With the win, McVay's record over the Cardinals improved to 10–1 over five seasons. The following week, the Rams traveled to Tampa Bay and narrowly beat the Buccaneers 30–27. The win put the Rams into the NFC Championship Game for the second time under McVay's leadership, giving him his fifth postseason victory, the most in team history. Returning to SoFi Stadium for the NFC Championship Game, the Rams rallied from a 10-point deficit to defeat their other NFC West rival, the 49ers, by a score of 20–17, with McVay winning his second conference title and advancing to Super Bowl LVI, where the Rams defeated the Cincinnati Bengals by a score of 23–20, rallying with a late touchdown to win. The victory made McVay the youngest head coach in NFL history to win the Super Bowl at age 36.

==== 2022 season ====
Prior to the season opener, the Rams announced that McVay and General Manager Les Snead had signed extensions with the team, keeping them with the franchise through the 2026 season. McVay and the Rams would host the Buffalo Bills in their first game for the 2022 season, where they unveiled their Super Bowl championship banner at SoFi Stadium. The Rams would lose 31–10, in what would be the first time McVay would lose a season opener, and the first time he would have an active season record under .500. McVay and the Rams struggled to defend their title throughout the season, as the team lost key members Matthew Stafford, Cooper Kupp, and Aaron Donald to injury for significant portions of the year. Injuries led to the team turning to former #1 overall pick Baker Mayfield to start at quarterback for the rest of the season. Mayfield finished the year with a 2–3 record with wins coming against the Las Vegas Raiders on Thursday Night Football and the Denver Broncos on Christmas. However, with consecutive road losses to the Los Angeles Chargers and Seattle Seahawks, the Rams finished 5–12 and missed the playoffs in McVay's first losing season as a head coach.

==== 2023 season ====
With the Rams having traded significant draft capital and given notably high contracts to pursue their Super Bowl championship, many predicted that a team rebuild loomed during the offseason. Despite McVay having signed an extension prior to the previous season, speculation arose that McVay would not want to take part in a rebuild and would instead step away from the team before the next season began. McVay would later reveal that he had considered stepping away from coaching, as the constant losing during the previous season had taken its toll, but his wife convinced him to stay. Shortly after the regular season finished, sources stated that McVay would return as head coach for the next season. Throughout the offseason, media outlets ruminated over the Rams' dismal 2022 season, and with the team handling $75 million in dead cap money along with a roster filled with first- and second-year players, few outside the franchise organization expected the team to compete for the playoffs. A winless (0–3) preseason in which the Rams were outscored 109–34 did little to dispel the pundits' pessimism.

The Rams opened the season with a surprisingly strong 30–13 rout of host Seattle. Although Los Angeles dropped three of its next four games against San Francisco (30–23), Cincinnati (19–16), and Philadelphia (23–14), the Rams displayed unexpected resilience against a trio of teams widely expected to contend for the Super Bowl. The emergence of rookie wide receiver Puka Nacua and second-year running back Kyren Williams propelled Los Angeles to a 29–23 overtime victory at Indianapolis in Week 4 and a 26–9 rout of Arizona at home in Week 6 to even the Rams' record at 3–3. But Williams suffered a severe ankle sprain that sidelined him on injured reserve for a month, and that, combined with injuries to quarterback Matthew Stafford and wide receiver Cooper Kupp, hampered the Rams who dropped three straight games going into the bye week.

Los Angeles returned from the break and gutted out a 17–16 victory over Seattle, then crushed Arizona (37–14) and Cleveland (36–19) before falling 37–31 to the AFC-leading Baltimore Ravens on the road. With Williams surpassing 1,000 yards rushing, Nacua setting numerous NFL rookie receiving records and the impressive play of rookie defensive stars Kobie Turner at nose tackle and Byron Young at linebacker, the Rams rolled to four straight victories to end the season. Back-to-back home victories against Washington (28–20) and New Orleans (30–22) were followed by a narrow 26–25 victory over the New York Giants that clinched a playoff berth (McVay's fifth in seven seasons), and a 21–20 win in Week 18 at San Francisco that ended a nine-game regular season losing streak to L.A.'s northern California nemesis. The Rams' 10–7 record improved McVay's regular season win total to 70 and overall win total (including playoffs) to 77, both second-most in franchise history behind John Robinson. Shortly after Los Angeles had clinched a playoff berth, McVay publicly declared that he intended to return as the team's head coach for the 2024 season.

During the Wild Card Round at Ford Field, the Rams narrowly lost 24–23 to the host Detroit Lions, in what marked in Detroit's first playoff win in 32 seasons. Following the game, McVay gave much praise to his team, which defied most expectations in reaching the playoffs in what many considered to be a rebuilding year. Following the end of the season, McVay stated: "Man, did I learn a lot and really appreciate this group. They helped me find my way again."

==== 2024 season ====
In 2024, McVay entered his eighth season as head coach of the Rams, reinvigorated after considering retirement during the previous offseason. Despite McVay's renewed enthusiasm, the Rams faced difficulties early in the season, starting with a 1–4 record by mid-October. Their sole victory came in Week 3, a 27–24 victory over the San Francisco 49ers. However, the team struggled with consistency, particularly on defense, but McVay remained optimistic about the development of younger players, emphasizing that the 2024 season felt like "Year 1 again" as the team transitioned into a new era. Following the bye week, the Rams earned back-to-back home wins against the Las Vegas Raiders (20–15) in Week 7 and Minnesota Vikings (30–20) in Week 8. With the latter, McVay became Rams franchise all-time leader in overall coaching victories with 80, surpassing the total of 79 by John Robinson, who coached the Rams from 1983 to 1991. In Week 13, McVay surpassed Robinson for most regular season victories in team history with his 76th coming in a 21–14 victory over the New Orleans Saints. Four weeks later, a 19–9 win over the New York Jets clinched for McVay his seventh winning season in eight years, and the following week the Rams defeated the Arizona Cardinals 13–9. The Rams' 10th victory of the season, combined with a strength of victory tiebreaker, clinched the NFC West division title for the fourth time in eight years under McVay, as well as advancing to the playoffs for the sixth time in McVay's eight seasons

Preparations to host the Minnesota Vikings in an NFC Wild Card Game were disrupted by the outbreak of the January 2025 Southern California wildfires. Initially maintaining a normal practice schedule as a series of fires broke out in surrounding communities, the NFL decided (along with the concurrence of both franchises) to move the game to State Farm Stadium in Glendale, Arizona. Despite the difficulties, McVay was able to keep his team focused and ready to play. The result was a resounding 27–9 rout of the Vikings that advanced the Rams to the divisional round. Following the triumph, McVay praised his team staying resilient amid all the adversity and becoming an inspiration for their stricken community. "With everything that's going on with our community, everything that these guys have gone through, I thought they epitomized and they represented the city the right way. You talk about sports offering a platform for people to come together, offer a little bit of temporary relief, and I thought the way that our team competed tonight was what it looked like."

Against Philadelphia in an NFC Divisional Playoff game, the Rams stayed close through three quarters, but critical turnovers and miscues had the Rams down late before mounting a comeback that fell short in the final minute. After the game, McVay again was effusive in praise for his team despite the losing effort. McVay stated: "I love this group, I love this coaching staff, I love these players, and I also understand and appreciate how difficult it is to be in positions like this where you've got the game in hand. I feel like we had total control toward the latter part of that game. Momentum was in our favor and we had an opportunity to win that game, and we just came up short."

==== 2025 season ====
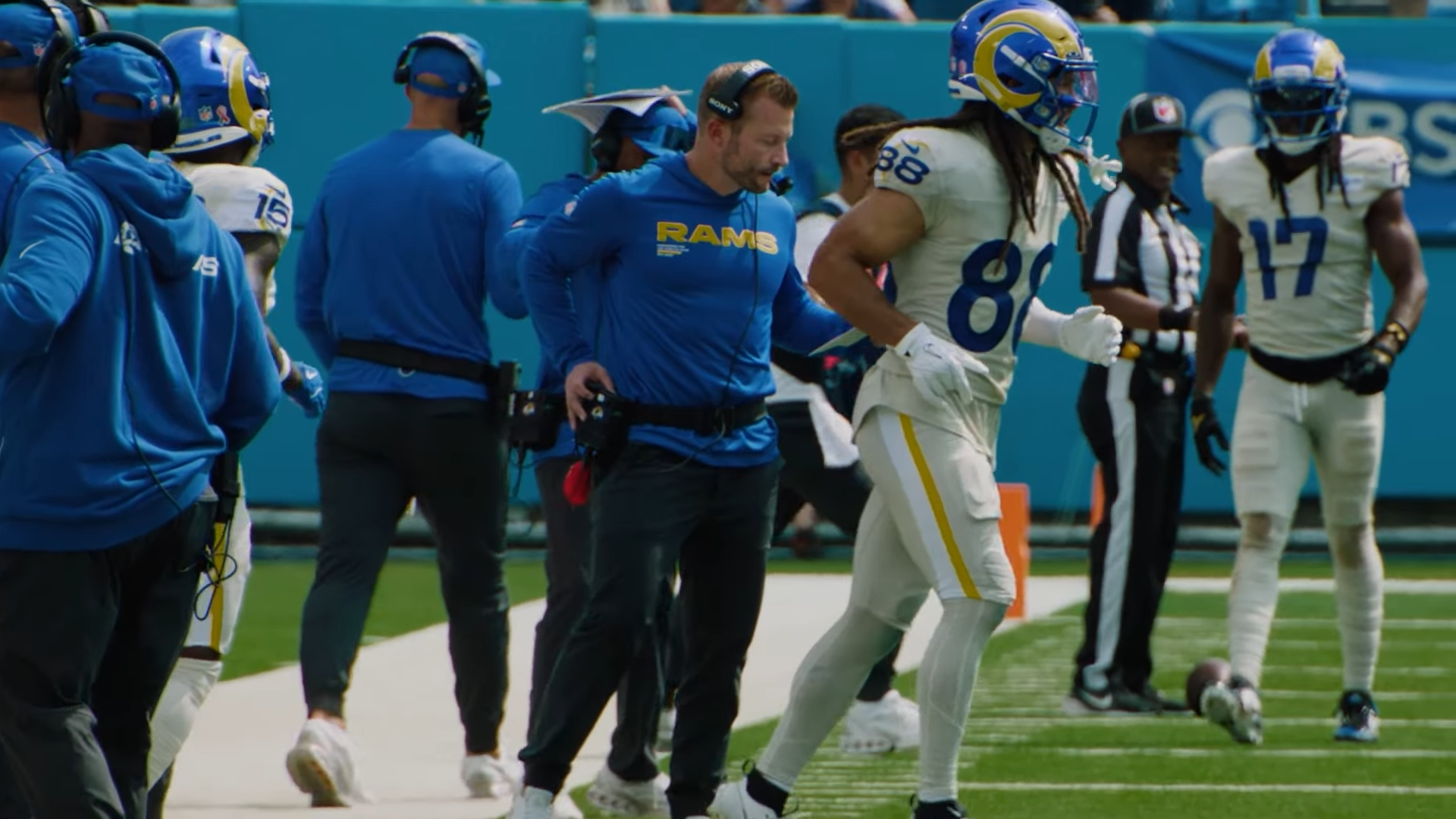
McVay (center) coaching the Rams in 2025

Coming off an NFC West title, the Rams now entered McVay's ninth season as a top contender to reach Super Bowl LX, and early wins over Houston (14–9) and Tennessee (33–19) seemed to confirm expectations. But in Week 3, the Rams had built a 26–7 third quarter lead on the road against the Philadelphia Eagles before the defending world champions rallied to score 26 unanswered points, including two blocked field goal attempts on the Rams' final two possessions (the second one was returned for the game-sealing touchdown) dooming their chances in a 33–26 loss. McVay took responsibility for himself and his coaching staff for the playcalling in the second half that led the way to Los Angeles's first defeat of the season, saying, "We came in with the expectations of being aggressive, playing to be able to win the football game. I thought that was reflected in how we did it. I'll always be critical of, am I putting players in the most successful outcomes and are we collectively as a staff?" The Rams bounced back with a wild 27–20 victory against the then-unbeaten Indianapolis Colts in Week 4, but four days later on Thursday Night Football, Los Angeles came out flat in falling behind 14–0 to visiting San Francisco, and though the Rams rallied to force overtime, again special teams miscues and a critical fumble by running back Kyren Williams at the goal line prevented Los Angeles from taking the lead. In the extra period following a 49ers field goal, the Rams drove to the San Francisco 11-yard line where on fourth-and-1, Williams was stuffed for no gain. McVay quickly blamed himself for the play call, lamenting in his postgame press conference, "I’m sick right now because I put our players in a s----y spot. I’ve got to live with that."

The Rams then proceeded to win their next six games. A 42–26 win in a Week 10 rematch at San Francisco made McVay the Rams' franchise leader in total games coached (154) and Los Angeles's 31–28 loss at Carolina in Week 13 to end the streak gave him the most regular season games coached (144). Prior to a 45–17 win at Arizona in Week 14, McVay fell ill and traveled separately from the team. A 41–34 triumph at home in Week 15 versus Detroit secured for McVay his franchise-best seventh playoff berth as head coach, and the next day, McVay and his wife welcomed the birth of their second son Christian, with McVay quipping that he had not gotten much sleep in the runup to the delivery. "What a crazy week to be playing on a Thursday...This is a good challenge. But it's a blessing to be able to play in meaningful games this late in the season. And so I've got a lot of appreciation for our staff. And fighting a good fight right now." But back-to-back losses at Seattle in Week 16 (38–37 in overtime on Thursday Night Football) and at Atlanta in Week 17 (27–24 on Monday Night Football) knocked the Rams out of contention for their second straight division crown. Following the loss to Seattle, McVay fired special teams coordinator Chase Blackburn, the first in-season dismissal of McVay's career. The Rams played their starters in a 37–20 victory over Arizona in Week 18 to finish the regular season with a 12–5 record, with McVay's 100th win (regular season and postseason) helping to match the second-highest single season win total of his career.

McVay was pleased with his team's effort and eager to get on to the postseason and a rematch with NFC South champion Carolina, saying, "I'm proud of the group and now we move forward. It’s a cool opportunity to be able to earn a chance to be one of the 14 teams in this tournament. I know how difficult it is and how competitive this league is. And to go back to a place that...This team humbled us a handful of weeks ago. And so, what a great challenge. As a competitor, if this doesn't get you excited, then I don't know what the hell you're doing." Playing on the road against the Panthers in an NFC Wild Card Game, Los Angeles charged out to a 14–0 lead, fell behind late but rallied for a 34–31 victory. Traveling for the NFC Divisional Round, numerous media outlets pointed out the unusual fact that with his team taking on the Chicago Bears, McVay would be facing the 15th different playoff team in 15 career playoff games up to that point. Playing in front of a national TV audience on Sunday Night Football, the Rams battled the Bears in the snow and wind to a 20–17 overtime victory. While elated with the win, McVay was very self-critical of his own preparation and strategy, saying after the game, "I did not like the feel for the flow of the game that I had outside of the first series where our guys did a great job...Defensively, it kept us in it, in spite of how poor of a job I did for our group. But like I said, you know, I'm really grateful for this group, being able to find a way, stick with it, and be able to overcome some bad coaching by me tonight." The day before coaching in his third conference championship, McVay celebrated his 40th birthday, joking at a press conference that week, "I'm not a big birthday guy...And if you guys say, 'Happy 40th,' I'll slap the (expletive) out of you." In the NFC Championship Game, the Rams rematched with NFC West rival Seattle and fought a close battle through four quarters before falling 31–27 to the Seahawks. It was McVay's first loss when playing for a conference title after previous wins in 2018 and 2021. McVay appeared stunned in front of the press following the game. "We came here with the expectation to win. We had our chances. They made their plays," McVay told reporters. "It was a great back-and-forth game by two great teams, but a couple critical errors ended up costing us. Love this team. It's one of my all-time favorites. I'll be honest with you guys right now, I'm pretty numb."

Just over a week after the end of the Rams' season, the team announced that McVay along with general manager Les Snead had both signed contract extensions to remain in their respective positions, though length and terms were unspecified. In a statement announcing the extensions, Rams owner Stan Kroenke lavished praise on McVay and Snead, saying, "As we enter their 10th season together, it is only fitting to reflect on the tremendous success Sean and Les have brought to this franchise, and the indelible impact they have made on Los Angeles and the NFL...and we are thrilled they will be leading the Los Angeles Rams for years to come." Speaking at his season-ending press conference following the announcement of his contract extension, McVay thanked the Kroenke family for their unwavering loyalty and confidence in him. "I've felt the most supported in the moments that you need it the most. And it's been unconditional, and it's been consistent, and our relationship is only built over these...going into year 10. And I value that more than, I think, ever before."

== Head coaching record ==
Team	Year	Regular season					Postseason			
Team	Year	Won	Lost	Ties	Win %	Finish	Won	Lost	Win %	Result
LAR	2017	11	5	0	.688	1st in NFC West	0	1	.000	Lost to Atlanta Falcons in NFC Wild Card Game
LAR	2018	13	3	0	.813	1st in NFC West	2	1	.667	Lost to New England Patriots in Super Bowl LIII
LAR	2019	9	7	0	.563	3rd in NFC West	—	—	—	—
LAR	2020	10	6	0	.625	2nd in NFC West	1	1	.500	Lost to Green Bay Packers in NFC Divisional Game
LAR	2021	12	5	0	.706	1st in NFC West	4	0	1.000	Super Bowl LVI champions
LAR	2022	5	12	0	.294	3rd in NFC West	—	—	—	—
LAR	2023	10	7	0	.588	2nd in NFC West	0	1	.000	Lost to Detroit Lions in NFC Wild Card Game
LAR	2024	10	7	0	.588	1st in NFC West	1	1	.500	Lost to Philadelphia Eagles in NFC Divisional Game
LAR	2025	12	5	0	.706	2nd in NFC West	2	1	.667	Lost to Seattle Seahawks in NFC Championship Game
LAR	2026	5	4	0	.556	TBD in NFC West	—	—	—	—
Total		97	61	0	.614		10	6	.625	

== Coaching tree ==
NFL head coaches under whom McVay has served:

- Jon Gruden, Tampa Bay Buccaneers (2008)
- Jim Haslett, Florida Tuskers (2009)
- Mike Shanahan, Washington Redskins (2010–2013)
- Jay Gruden, Washington Redskins (2014–2016)

Ten of McVay's assistant coaches that have been hired as head coaches in the NFL or NCAA, with one more having served as an interim coach for the NFL:

- Matt LaFleur, Green Bay Packers (2019–present)
- Zac Taylor, Cincinnati Bengals (2019–present)
- Jedd Fisch, Arizona (2021–2023), Washington (2024–present)
- Brandon Staley, Los Angeles Chargers (2021–2023)
- Kevin O'Connell, Minnesota Vikings (2022–present)
- Raheem Morris, Atlanta Falcons (2024–2025) (Note: Morris had already served as a head coach in the NFL with the Tampa Bay Buccaneers)
- Thomas Brown, Chicago Bears (2024, interim)
- Liam Coen, Jacksonville Jaguars (2025–present)
- Scott Frost, UCF (2025–present)
- Tory Woodbury, Winston-Salem State (2026–present)
- Mike LaFleur, Arizona Cardinals (2026–present)

Players under McVay who become head coaches in the NFL or NCAA:

- DeSean Jackson, Delaware State (2025–present)

=== "Sean McVay effect" ===
Because of McVay's success as the Rams head coach at a young age, as well as his offensive prowess, NFL teams have started to look more towards younger offensive-minded coaches to be their head coaches, as opposed to coaches with defensive backgrounds or more experience. This trend has been coined the "Sean McVay effect". Coaches who were hired as a result of this trend include Matt LaFleur (six years older than McVay), Zac Taylor (three years older), Kevin O'Connell (eight months older), and Liam Coen (two months older), who all served as offensive assistants to McVay, along with Mike McDaniel (three years older), who was on the Washington Redskins coaching staff with McVay from 2011 to 2013. Others have also cited McVay's offensive success to resulting in the fast rise of Kliff Kingsbury (six years older), who was ousted as head coach of a struggling Texas Tech program to being hired as head coach of the Arizona Cardinals in a period of three months. This term would later be expanded to include the hiring of relatively younger head coaches with defensive backgrounds as well.

McVay held the distinction as the NFL's youngest head coach for seven years, until Jerod Mayo, who was born a month after McVay, was hired as head coach for the New England Patriots in 2024.

== Personal life ==
McVay resides in Hidden Hills, California with his wife, Veronika Khomyn, a former model from Ukraine whom he met when he was a coach for Washington and she was a student at George Mason University. They previously lived in Encino along with Chris Shula, then the Rams linebackers coach, as a housemate. On June 22, 2019, McVay and Khomyn got engaged while vacationing in Cannes, France. They got married on June 4, 2022. Their first son, Jordan John McVay, was born in October 2023. A second son, Christian Alexander McVay, was born in December 2025.

McVay was raised Catholic.

== See also ==
- List of Super Bowl head coaches
