= Kliff Kingsbury =

American football player and coach (born 1979)

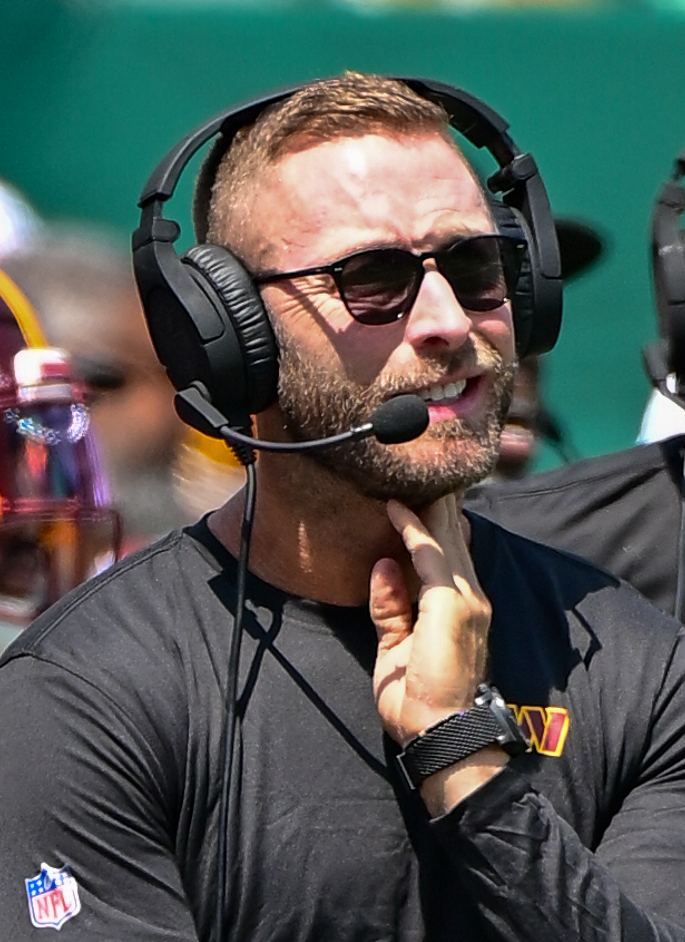
- Kingsbury with the Washington Commanders in 2024

Los Angeles Rams
- Title: Assistant head coach

Personal information
- Born: August 9, 1979 (age 47); San Antonio, Texas, U.S.
- Listed height: 6 ft 3 in (1.91 m)
- Listed weight: 220 lb (100 kg)

Career information
- Position: Quarterback
- High school: New Braunfels (New Braunfels, Texas)
- College: Texas Tech (1998–2002)
- NFL draft: 2003: 6th round, 201st overall pick

Career history

Playing
- New England Patriots (2003); New Orleans Saints (2004–2005)*; Denver Broncos (2005)*; New York Jets (2005); Cologne Centurions (2006); Buffalo Bills (2006)*; Montreal Alouettes (2007)*; Winnipeg Blue Bombers (2007)
- * Offseason or practice squad member only

Coaching
- Houston (2008–2011); Offensive quality control coach (2008–2009); Quarterbacks coach (2010); Co-offensive coordinator & quarterbacks coach (2011); Texas A&M (2012) Offensive coordinator & quarterbacks coach; Texas Tech (2013–2018) Head coach; Arizona Cardinals (2019–2022) Head coach; USC (2023) Senior offensive analyst; Washington Commanders (2024–2025) Offensive coordinator; Los Angeles Rams (2026–present) Assistant head coach

Awards and highlights
- As player: Super Bowl champion (XXXVIII); First-team All-Big 12 (2002); 2× second-team All-Big 12 (2000, 2001); Sammy Baugh Trophy (2002); AP National Offensive Player of the Year (2002); NCAA passing yards leader (2002); NCAA passing touchdowns leader (2002)

Career NFL statistics
- Passing attempts: 2
- Passing completions: 1
- Passing yards: 17
- Stats at Pro Football Reference

Head coaching record
- Regular season: 28–37–1 (.432)
- Postseason: 0–1 (.000)
- Career: NFL: 28–38–1 (.425); NCAA: 35–40 (.467)
- Coaching profile at Pro Football Reference

Kliff Timothy Kingsbury (born August 9, 1979) is an American professional football coach and former quarterback who is the assistant head coach for the Los Angeles Rams of the National Football League (NFL). He played college football for the Texas Tech Red Raiders, finishing in the top three in several school passing records before being selected in the sixth round of the 2003 NFL draft by the New England Patriots. Kingsbury was a member of several other NFL and CFL teams before entering coaching in 2008.

Kingsbury was the offensive coordinator of the 2011 Houston Cougars that led the NCAA in nearly all offensive statistics that season, averaging 50 points and nearly 600 yards per game. He was later the head coach of Texas Tech (2013–2018) and the Arizona Cardinals (2019–2022). Kingsbury has been cited for his work in developing quarterbacks Case Keenum, Johnny Manziel, Baker Mayfield, Patrick Mahomes, Kyler Murray, Caleb Williams, and Jayden Daniels.

== Early life ==
Kingsbury was born on August 9, 1979, in San Antonio, Texas. Kingsbury played football at New Braunfels High School, where his father was head coach. Kingsbury also was a member of the baseball, basketball, and track teams. As a quarterback at New Braunfels, Kingsbury threw for 3,009 yards and 34 touchdowns while leading the team to the Class 5A Division II semifinals and a 13–2 record. He was named the offensive MVP in the Texas High School Coaches All-Star Game. Kingsbury graduated 3rd in his class of 450, and was an Academic All-State selection. Kingsbury was inducted into the Texas High School Football Hall of Fame in 2018.

== College career ==
Kingsbury played 43 games at quarterback for the Texas Tech Red Raiders from 1998 to 2002, completing 1,229 of 1,881 passes for 12,423 yards with 95 touchdowns and 40 interceptions. Kingsbury set 39 school records, 13 Big 12 Conference records, and 7 NCAA FBS records.

In his redshirt freshman year in 1999, Kingsbury appeared in six games, starting the season finale against Oklahoma. He completed 25 of 57 passes for 492 yards, four touchdowns and an interception in his initial collegiate season. In 2000, he assumed the starting role and connected on 362 of 585 passes for 3,418 yards, 21 touchdowns and 17 interceptions. He added two scores on 78 carries. His season ended with a loss to the East Carolina Pirates in the Galleryfurniture.com Bowl, with a final score of 40–27. As a junior in 2001, Kingsbury was an All-District first-team selection and All-Big 12 Conference second-team pick by the league's coaches for his performance. He completed 365 of 528 passes for 3,502 yards, 25 touchdowns and only nine interceptions.

In 2002, Kingsbury averaged 350.2 yards per game, leading the nation with 5,017 passing yards and his 45 passing touchdowns, which nearly doubled his mark set during the 2001 season. As a senior, Kingsbury led Texas Tech to a 9–5 record, defeating Big 12 Conference rivals Texas, Texas A&M and Baylor, in addition to a 55-15 routing of the Clemson Tigers in the Tangerine Bowl.

Following the 2002 season, Kingsbury was awarded the Sammy Baugh Trophy, annually presented to the nation's best college passer. He was additionally selected as a Verizon/CoSIDA Academic All-American and Player of the Year, a unanimous All-Big 12 Conference first-team selection, was named the Associated Press Offensive Player of the Year, and finished ninth in Heisman Trophy voting. These awards followed a season during which Kingsbury shattered his own school single-season records by completing 479 of 712 passes (67.3 percent) for 5,017 yards, 45 touchdowns and just 13 interceptions. He also added two rushing scores on 102 carries.

Kingsbury, along with Graham Harrell, are the only Texas Tech quarterbacks to have beaten both the Oklahoma Sooners and Texas Longhorns during their careers as starters. Kingsbury led Tech to three bowl games in his three years as a starter, with a 24–16 overall record. In 2003, he held the NCAA records for career plays, career plays per game, single season and career passing attempts, single season and career passing completions, highest single game completion percentage, career lowest percentage of passes intercepted, and most single season and career games gaining 200 yards or more.

Kingsbury was only the third player in college football history to throw for over 10,000 yards, gain over 10,000 yards in total offense and complete over 1,000 passes in a career. He also became just the fourth player in college football to throw for over 3,000 yards three times during his career. Kingsbury was also an Academic All-Big 12 Conference choice following his sophomore campaign in 2000.

=== Statistics ===
Legend
	Led NCAA Division I FBS
**Bold**	Career high

Season	Team	Games (Note: Kingsbury’s statistics from two of his three bowl game appearances are excluded, as bowl game statistics were not officially counted toward season or career totals prior to 2002.)			Passing								Rushing			
Season	Team	GP	GS	Record	Cmp	Att	Pct	Yds	Y/A	TD	Int	Rtg	Att	Yds	Avg	TD
1998	Texas Tech	0	0	—	Redshirted (redshirt)											
1999	Texas Tech	6	1	1–0	25	57	43.9	492	**8.6**	4	1	136.0	27	–23	–0.9	1
2000	Texas Tech	13	13	7–6	362	585	61.9	3,418	5.8	21	**17**	117.0	78	**19**	**0.2**	**2**
2001	Texas Tech	12	12	7–5	365	529	**69.0**	3,502	6.6	25	9	136.8	66	–48	–0.7	0
2002	Texas Tech	**14**	**14**	**9–5**	**479**	**712**	67.3	**5,017**	7.0	**45**	13	**143.7**	**102**	–114	–1.1	**2**
Career		45	40	24–16	1,231	1,883	65.4	12,429	6.6	95	40	133.2	273	–166	–0.6	5

== Professional career ==
Pre-draft measurables
Height	Weight	Arm length	Hand span	40-yard dash	10-yard split	20-yard split	20-yard shuttle	Three-cone drill	Vertical jump	Broad jump	Wonderlic
6 ft 3 1/2 in (1.92 m)	213 lb (97 kg)	32 in (0.81 m)	9 3/4 in (0.25 m)	4.77 s	1.63 s	2.74 s	4.10 s	6.92 s	30.0 in (0.76 m)	8 ft 5 in (2.57 m)	31
All values from NFL Combine

=== New England Patriots ===
Kingsbury was selected by the New England Patriots in the sixth round (201st overall) of the 2003 NFL draft. He did not play in his rookie season of 2003, spending the year on the Patriots' injured reserve with an arm injury. However, Kingsbury got a Super Bowl ring after the team won Super Bowl XXXVIII. He was waived by the Patriots on September 6, 2004.

=== New Orleans Saints ===
Kingsbury was signed by the New Orleans Saints to the team's practice squad, where he spent the entire 2004 season. Kingsbury went to training camp with the Saints that season and completed 10-of-21 passes for 139 yards with a long of 57 yards and two interceptions.

=== Denver Broncos ===
Kingsbury was signed to the Denver Broncos' practice squad on September 6, 2005. He was released on September 21.

=== New York Jets ===
Kingsbury signed with the New York Jets on September 28, 2005. He made his NFL debut on November 20, playing part of the fourth quarter for the Jets against the Broncos. Kingsbury completed one of two pass attempts, a 17-yard reception by Dante Ridgeway.

The Jets assigned Kingsbury to the Cologne Centurions of NFL Europe in 2006. He posted the top quarterback rating of any Cologne quarterback (73.7) while completing 58 of 102 passes for 633 yards and two touchdowns. He also led Cologne with a 56.9 completion percentage.

Kingsbury was waived by the Jets on May 30, 2006.

=== Buffalo Bills ===
The Buffalo Bills signed Kingsbury in 2006 and he attended training camp with the Bills, but Kingsbury was cut before the regular season.

=== Canadian Football League ===
On March 30, 2007, Kingsbury signed with the Montreal Alouettes. He spent part of training camp in Montreal before being traded to the Winnipeg Blue Bombers on June 20 in exchange for quarterback Brad Banks. Kingsbury was the third-string quarterback for the 2007 Blue Bombers season behind Kevin Glenn and Ryan Dinwiddie.

== Coaching career ==
=== Houston Cougars (2008–2011) ===
In August 2008, Kingsbury joined the Houston Cougars as a quality control coach. He received recognition for the performance of the Houston offense in 2009 with Case Keenum at the helm. Keenum finished his Houston career with multiple NCAA Division I passing records. With Holgorsen departing to become the offensive coordinator at Oklahoma State University, Kingsbury was promoted co-offensive coordinator and quarterbacks coach for the Cougars alongside Jason Phillips. In 2011, Kingsbury served as playcaller of an offense that led the NCAA in nearly all offensive statistics, averaging 50 points and nearly 600 yards per game.

=== Texas A&M Aggies (2012) ===
Kingsbury was named the offensive coordinator for the Texas A&M Aggies in 2012, coaching Heisman Trophy-winning quarterback Johnny Manziel. The Aggies led the Southeastern Conference in rushing, passing, total and scoring offense, and were the nation's only offense ranked in the top 15 of the NCAA statistics in all four categories. Kingsbury was named a finalist for the Broyles Award.

=== Texas Tech Red Raiders (2013–2018) ===
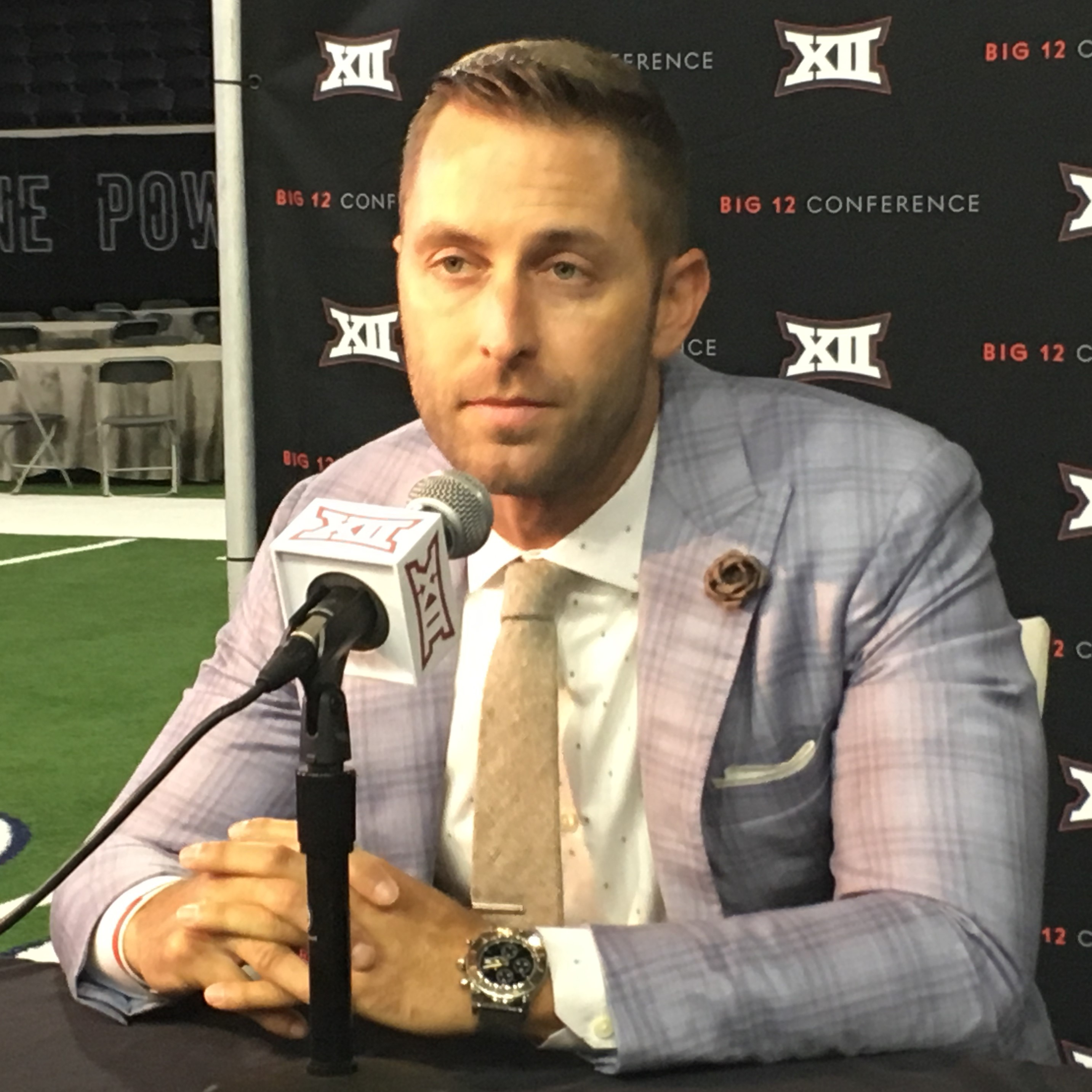
Kingsbury in 2017

With the rapid success with Manziel, Kingsbury asked head coach Kevin Sumlin to make him the highest paid offensive coordinator in the country; Sumlin refused. Kingsbury then moved on, accepting the head coaching job with the Texas Tech Red Raiders on December 12, 2012. His contract included a salary of $10.5 million over five years. At age 33, Kingsbury was the second-youngest head coach of a team in an AQ conference and the third-youngest head coach in college football.

Kingsbury made his head coaching debut August 30, 2013, with a 41–23 victory over the SMU Mustangs. Kingsbury chose walk-on true freshman quarterback Baker Mayfield for the starting role at the position, and Mayfield was named Big 12 Offensive Player of the Week for his performance. Mayfield was later supplanted by Davis Webb, another true freshman quarterback, due to a knee injury during the Kansas game. Following Webb's first start against Iowa State, Webb was also named Big 12 Offensive Player of the Week. Texas Tech became the only school in the Big 12 Conference to have had three different freshman quarterbacks win the award, with the first being Kingsbury himself in 1999.

The Red Raiders made their Associated Press Top 25 debut in the Kingsbury era following a win over TCU on September 12, 2013. It was the earliest a first year coach at Texas Tech achieved a spot in the rankings. Kingsbury also became the first coach in Texas Tech history to start the season 6–0 in their debut season after the Red Raiders defeated Iowa State on October 12, 2013. Following a victory against West Virginia on October 19, 2013, Kingsbury led the Red Raiders to a 7–0 start for only the fourth time in program history. The 10th-place ranking the team received in the BCS also marked the highest the program had been ranked since the 2008 season. With the win over West Virginia, Kingsbury became the first Big 12 coach to start his career 7–0. The Red Raiders lost the final five games of the season, finishing the rookie coach's first regular season at 7–5. Tight end Jace Amaro was also named as a Consensus All-American, the first Red Raider to be selected as such since Michael Crabtree in 2008.

Kingsbury and the Red Raiders capped off the season with a 37–23 upset over the #14 ranked Arizona State in the 2013 Holiday Bowl following an impressive performance by quarterback Davis Webb. Two of Kingsbury's players would be selected in the 2014 NFL draft, Amaro and Will Smith. Following the season, Baker Mayfield transferred to Oklahoma. He eventually won the 2017 Heisman Trophy and was selected first in the 2018 NFL draft. On August 29, 2014, Kingsbury received a $1 million raise to $3.5 million and a contract extension through 2020. The extension was given following an announcement for a $185 million athletic fundraising campaign. Under Kingsbury's leadership Texas Tech sold out 2014 season tickets for the first time since Texas Tech's inaugural 1925 season. The 2014 team struggled with numerous injuries, finishing 4–8 on the season.

The 2015 season concluded at 7–6 before losing in the Texas Bowl to LSU. The Red Raiders finished 5–7 in 2016. The team disappointed with conference wins against Kansas, TCU, and Baylor and finished in 8th place in the Big 12. The Red Raiders finished the 2016 season with a 55–34 victory over Baylor. This victory snapped a 5-game losing streak against the Bears. The 2016 team finished with the 6th best offense and the worst defense in Division I FBS. The team finished the 2017 season 6–7. The team showed signs of improvement as the offense finishing #16 in the country overcoming the loss of first round pick Patrick Mahomes. The defense also showed signs of improvement jumping up to joint #58 overall, a vast improvement for a defense that was the worst in the NCAA the prior season. At the conclusion of the season, athletic director Kirby Hocutt confirmed that Kingsbury would be returning for his 6th season as the Red Raiders coach.

The 2018 season started quickly with the Red Raiders defeating Houston and Oklahoma State on their way to a 5–2 record. Texas Tech then dropped its final five games of the season to finish at 5–7. Three straight losing seasons overall and six straight losing seasons in the Big 12 ultimately sealed the fate for Kingsbury. Athletic director Kirby Hocutt announced on November 25 that Kingsbury would not be retained for the 2019 season. He left with an overall record of 35–40 (including 13 victories over lower tier Group of Five and FCS competition) and 19–35 in Big 12 play.

=== Arizona Cardinals (2019–2022) ===
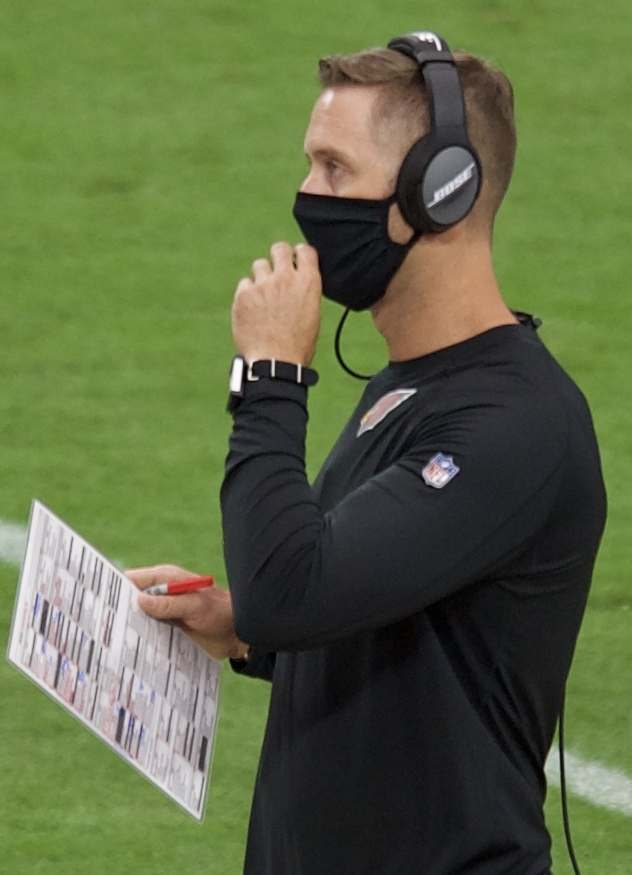
Kingsbury in 2020

Kingsbury was hired by USC as their new offensive coordinator in December 2018 but resigned a month later to look into NFL opportunities. On January 8, 2019, he was hired as head coach of the Arizona Cardinals. Some attributed Kingsbury's hiring to the "Sean McVay effect", a trend in the league of teams hiring younger offensive minded head coaches. Kingsbury won his first game against the Cincinnati Bengals and finished the season 4th in the NFC West with a record of 5–10–1.

In 2020, the Cardinals finished third in the NFC West with an 8–8 record. The season was famous for the Hail Murray play against the Buffalo Bills, in which quarterback Kyler Murray threw a game winning Hail Mary pass to DeAndre Hopkins to help the Cardinals beat the Bills 32–30.

In October 2021, Kingsbury and several other Cardinals coaches had tested positive for COVID-19 and were unable to coach in a game against the Cleveland Browns. The Cardinals finished 2nd in the NFC West and made the playoffs with an 11–6 record. In his playoff debut, Kingsbury and the Cardinals lost 34–11 in the first round to the eventual Super Bowl champion Los Angeles Rams.

Despite signing a six-year contract extension earlier in 2022, Kingsbury was fired after the Cardinals posted a 4–13 record that year. He finished his tenure with a 28–37–1 record and one playoff appearance.

=== USC Trojans (2023) ===
Kingsbury joined the USC Trojans as a senior offensive analyst under head coach Lincoln Riley in April 2023, where he worked with quarterback Caleb Williams.

=== Washington Commanders (2024–2025) ===
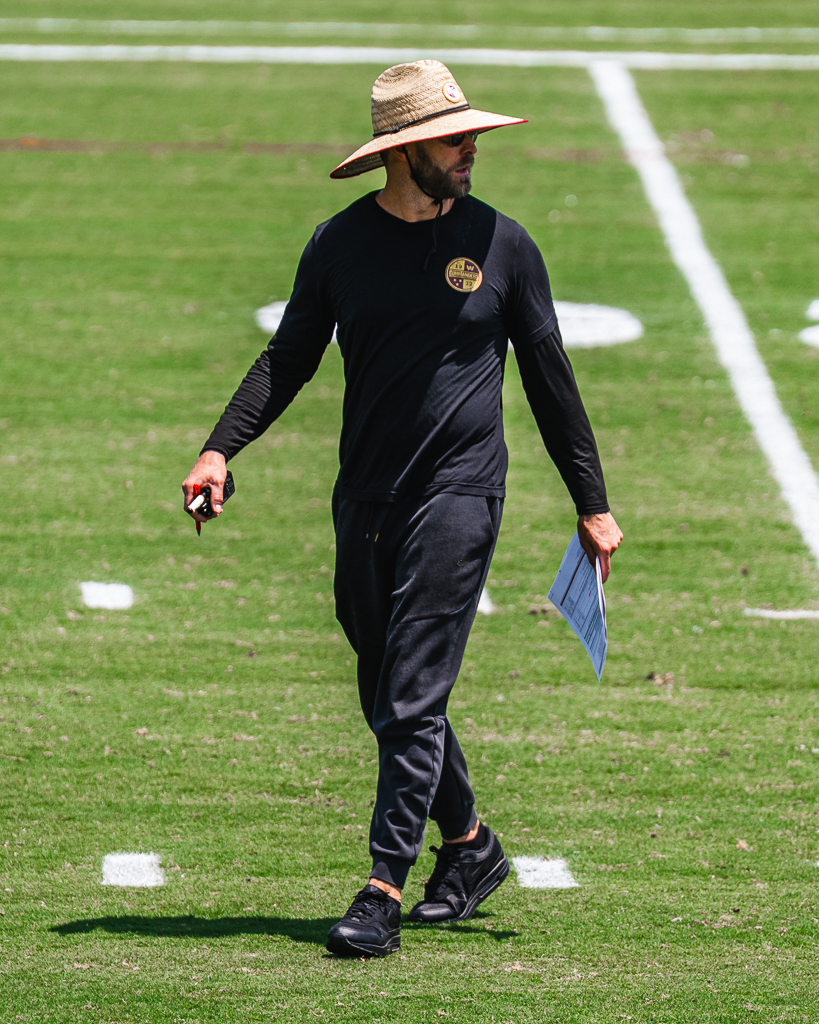
Kingsbury in 2025

On February 5, 2024, Kingsbury was hired by the Washington Commanders as offensive coordinator under head coach Dan Quinn. He had previously been negotiating for the same role with the Las Vegas Raiders before talks fell through. Working with rookie quarterback Jayden Daniels, who set the rookie record for most rushing yards in a season at his position, Washington's offense tied for the franchise's second most total points in a season (485) and ranked among the top three in rushing and total yards in team history. Following the 2025 season, Kingsbury and the team mutually agreed to part ways.

=== Los Angeles Rams (2026–present) ===
On February 23, 2026, Kingsbury was named the assistant head coach of the Los Angeles Rams, working under head coach Sean McVay.

== Personal life ==
Kingsbury was born in San Antonio, Texas. His father, Tim, is a Purple Heart recipient of the Vietnam War. Kingsbury's mother, Sally, died in 2005 of soft tissue sarcoma. He graduated from New Braunfels High School where he was the starting quarterback. Kingsbury graduated in 2001 with a Bachelor of Business Administration degree in management from the Rawls College of Business at Texas Tech.

== Head coaching record ==
=== College ===
Year	Team	Overall	Conference	Standing	Bowl/playoffs
Texas Tech Red Raiders (Big 12 Conference) (2013–2018)
2013	Texas Tech	8–5	4–5	6th	W Holiday
2014	Texas Tech	4–8	2–7	8th	
2015	Texas Tech	7–6	4–5	T–5th	L Texas
2016	Texas Tech	5–7	3–6	T–6th	
2017	Texas Tech	6–7	3–6	8th	L Birmingham
2018	Texas Tech	5–7	3–6	T–7th	
Texas Tech:		35–40	19–35		
Total:		35–40			

=== NFL ===
Team	Year	Regular season					Postseason			
Team	Year	Won	Lost	Ties	Win %	Finish	Won	Lost	Win %	Result
ARI	2019	5	10	1	.344	4th in NFC West	—	—	—	—
ARI	2020	8	8	0	.500	3rd in NFC West	—	—	—	—
ARI	2021	11	6	0	.647	2nd in NFC West	0	1	.000	Lost to Los Angeles Rams in NFC Wild Card Game
ARI	2022	4	13	0	.235	4th in NFC West	—	—	—	—
Total		28	37	1	.432		0	1	.000	
