= Sean McVay effect =

Trend in NFL coaching hiring

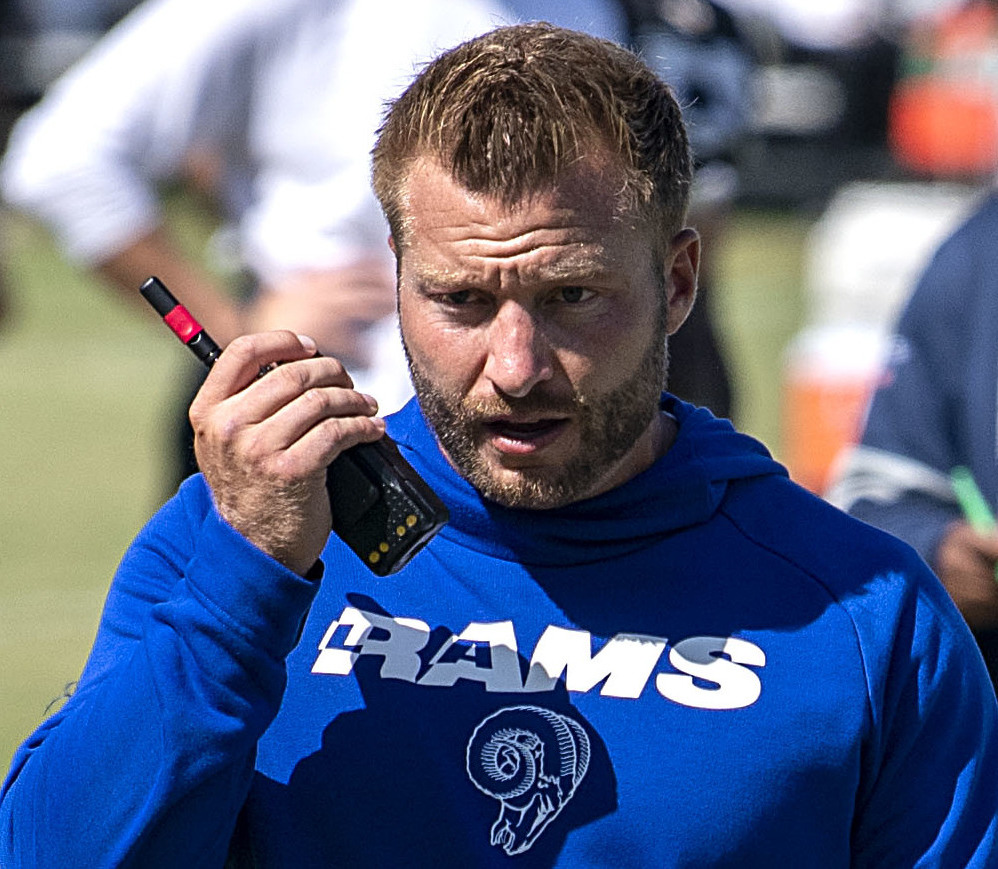
Los Angeles Rams head coach Sean McVay is the namesake of the term, having been hired by the team at 30 years old.

The Sean McVay effect is a term used to describe a National Football League (NFL) trend regarding teams hiring young head coaches that specialize in offensive strategy but would later be expanded to describe the NFL trend of hiring young head coaches in general. The trend originated in 2017 when 30-year-old Sean McVay was hired as head coach of the Los Angeles Rams, subsequently making him the youngest-ever NFL head coach in the Super Bowl era (1966–present). Within a year in charge, McVay rapidly changed the culture of the organization and turned the Rams into the league's highest-scoring offense, resulting in the team becoming perennial title contenders and eventual champions in Super Bowl LVI. In light of McVay's quick success, NFL teams increasingly began to hire relatively younger coaches. The "Sean McVay effect" term would initially be coined by Mark Maske of The Washington Post, while Mike Sando of The Athletic would later call this trend a "coaching youth revolution" that reshaped the NFL.

== Background ==
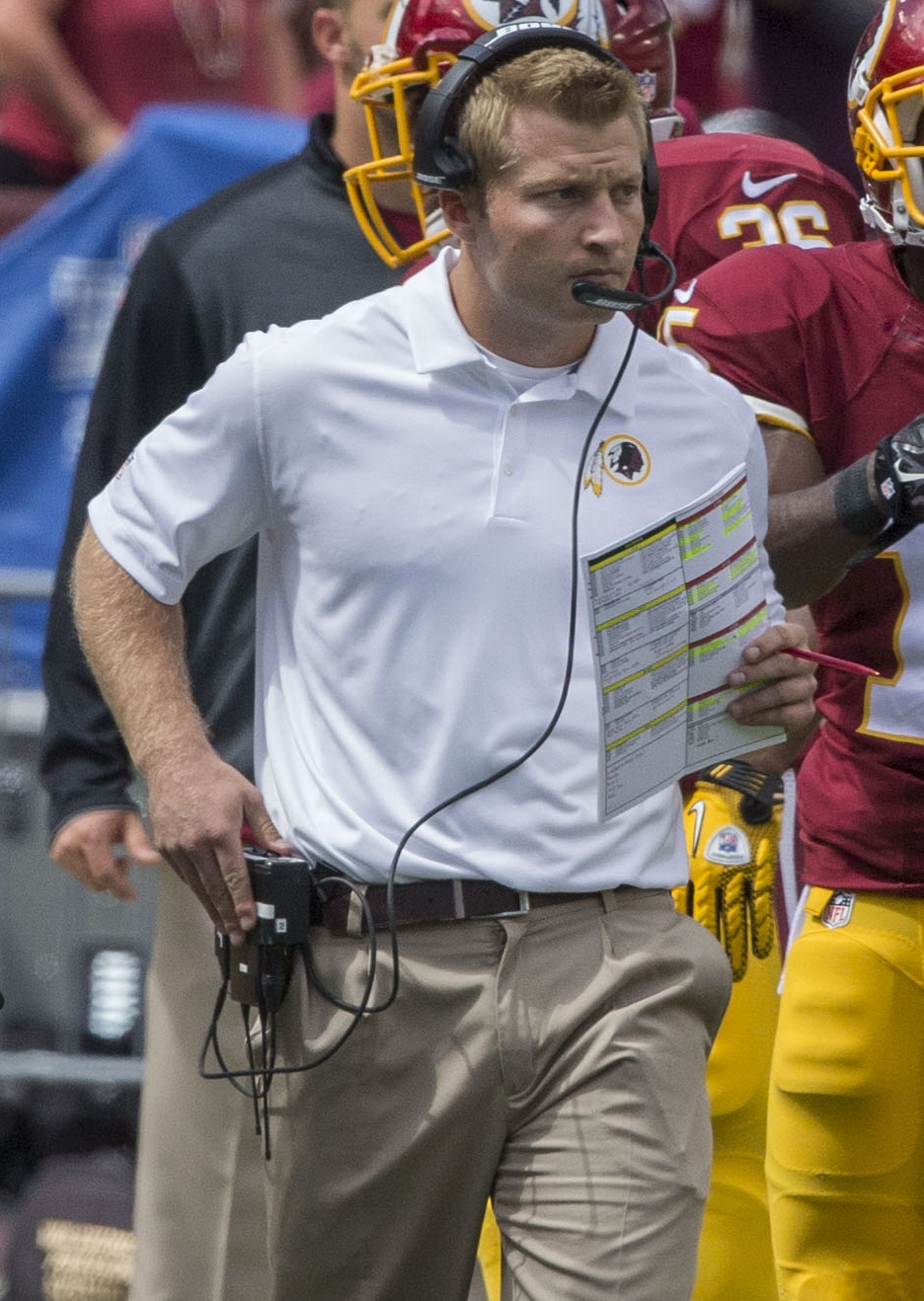
McVay as the Washington offensive coordinator in 2014

On January 12, 2017, the Los Angeles Rams hired Washington offensive coordinator Sean McVay, who was then aged 30, as their head coach. McVay began his NFL coaching career in 2010 as Washington's assistant tight ends coach before working his way up to becoming their offensive coordinator in 2014, a role he held for three years. Few expected McVay to be a viable head coaching candidate in the offseason and thought he would remain with Washington following the hiring cycle, but McVay impressed the Rams with his knowledge and poise during his interview. His hire made McVay the youngest head coach in the NFL and the youngest since 1938, when Art Lewis became coach of the Cleveland Rams at 27 years old. Prior to McVay's hiring, the four youngest head coaching hires in the Super Bowl era (1966–present) – Lane Kiffin, Raheem Morris, Dave Shula, and Josh McDaniels – had a combined win–loss record of 52–115 before being fired by their respective teams.

McVay took over a Rams team that finished the 2016 season last in points, total yards and first downs, and that were later ranked as the second-worst offense of the 2010s. Under McVay's new leadership, the Rams led the league in total offense in 2017, making them the first team in the Super Bowl era to go from last to first in total offense in a single season. In addition to McVay's coaching acumen, many noted how he was able to change the culture of the organization with his willingness to engage with players and take accountability for his own shortcomings. Despite being younger than some of the players on the Rams' roster when he was named head coach, McVay quickly gained the locker room’s trust and respect. The Rams reached the playoffs in McVay's first season, ending a twelve-year postseason drought for the franchise. McVay received recognition from the league and the media for turning around the team's fortunes, and at the season's conclusion he became the youngest-ever recipient of the AP NFL Coach of the Year award at 32 years old.

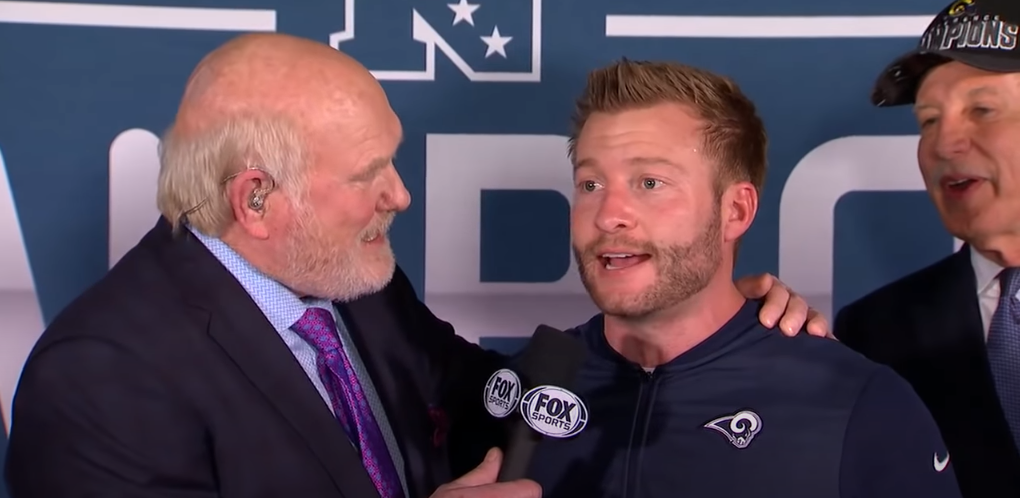
McVay being interviewed by television sports analyst Terry Bradshaw (left) after the Rams won the 2018 NFC Championship in his second head coaching year

The following season, McVay's second with the team, the Rams returned to the playoffs and won the 2018 NFC Championship Game against the New Orleans Saints. At age 33, this made McVay the youngest head coach to lead his team to the Super Bowl. The Rams ultimately lost Super Bowl LIII to the New England Patriots.

== Coaching hiring trends after McVay ==
=== Head coaches ===
Following McVay's quick turnaround of the Rams, many NFL teams sought to replicate the strategy of hiring a young head coach that specialized in offensive strategy. Journalist Mark Maske of The Washington Post coined the term "Sean McVay effect" in the 2018 offseason, after McVay's first year as a head coach, in reference to the fact that both Kansas City Chiefs offensive coordinator Matt Nagy (39) and Philadelphia Eagles quarterbacks coach John DeFilippo (39) were expected to receive head coaching interviews. Maske stated that the two would have had to wait years for such opportunities under the previous circumstances. Mike Sando of The Athletic cited former Minnesota Vikings head coach Brad Childress as an example of this older hiring practice; Childress spent 18 seasons in the college football ranks, four years as an NFL quarterbacks coach, and then four years as an NFL offensive coordinator before getting his first NFL head coaching job at the age of 50. Maske cited McVay's instant success during his debut season as the reason why Nagy and DeFilippo could bypass such a waiting time and immediately receive serious head coaching considerations. Nagy would soon be hired as the head coach of the Chicago Bears.

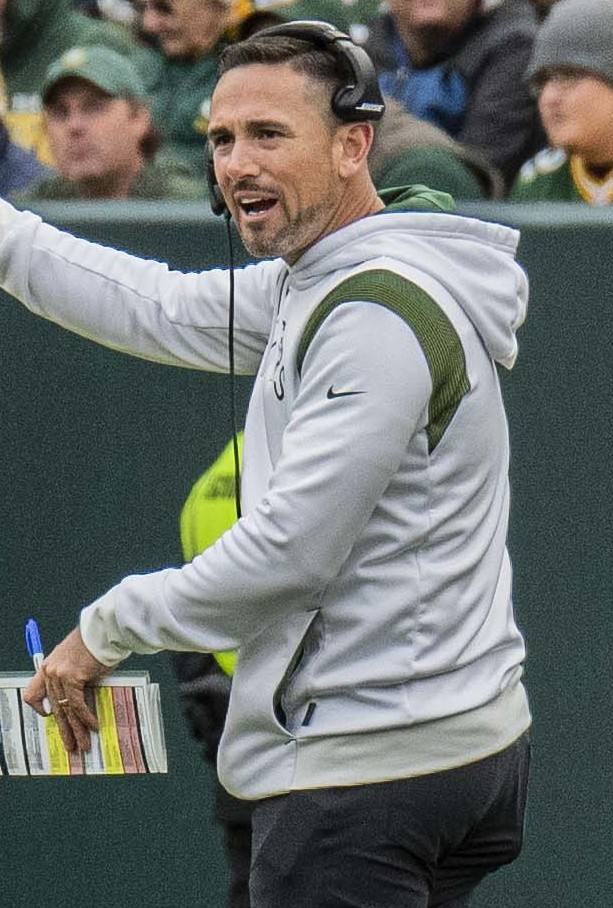
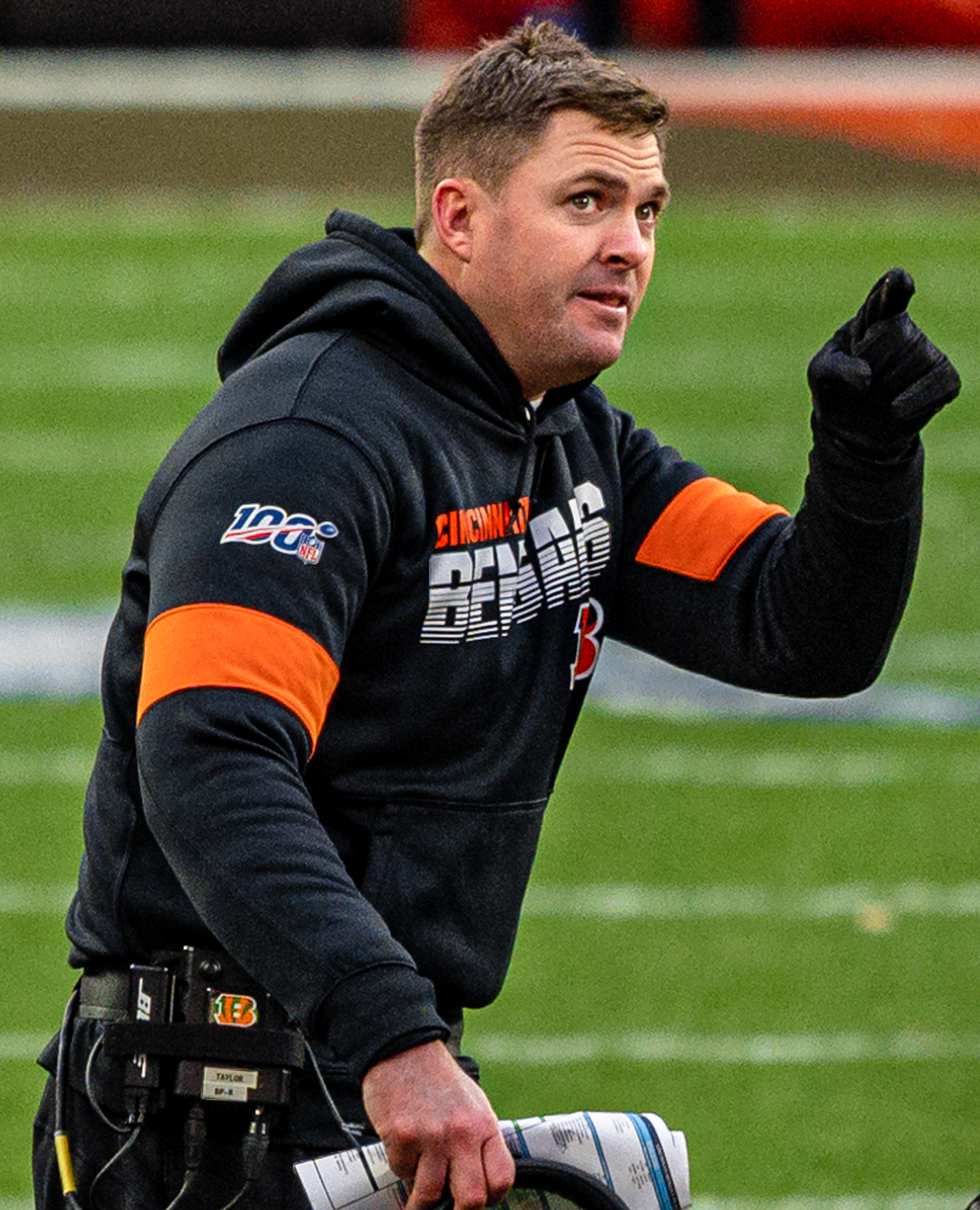
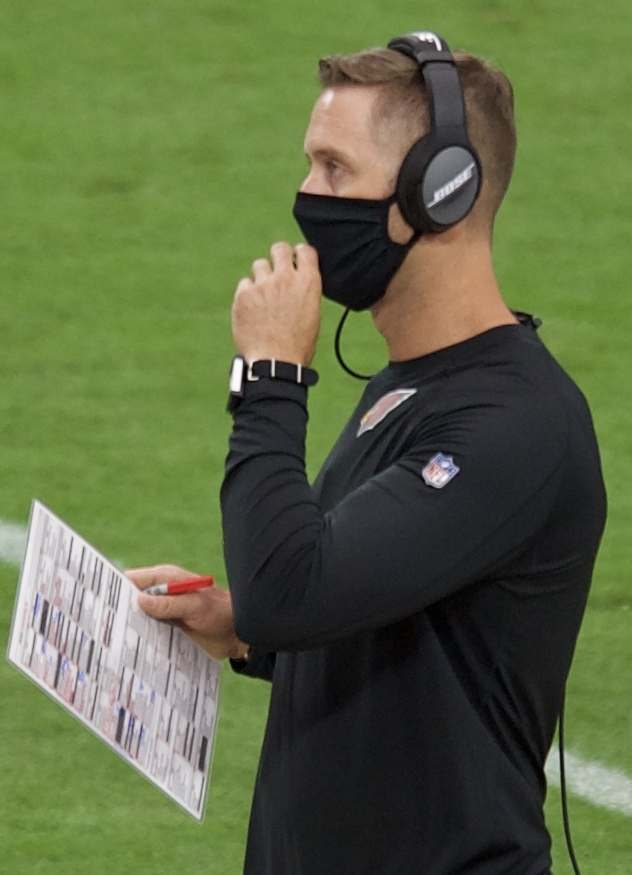
Matt LaFleur, Zac Taylor, and Kliff Kingsbury were hired in 2019 as NFL head coaches to emulate McVay's success. LaFleur and Taylor had worked under McVay on the Rams.

In the wake of the Rams' continued success and Super Bowl appearance during McVay's second year, the subsequent 2019 offseason had several more hires in the mold of McVay, with Matt LaFleur (39), Kliff Kingsbury (39), Adam Gase (40), Freddie Kitchens (44) and Zac Taylor (35) all becoming the head coaches of different teams. Many of these coaches were noted to be hired due to their connections with McVay; LaFleur had previously served as McVay's offensive coordinator, Taylor had stints as the Rams' wide receivers coach and quarterbacks coach under McVay, while Kingsbury was initially publicized as being "friends with Rams coach Sean McVay" upon the announcement of his hiring. A month after the 2019 season began, sportswriter Bill Barnwell quipped that "anyone who has ever worn a polo shirt around McVay is now an NFL head coach", while Taylor himself similarly mentioned years later that "I think the joke is if you ever had a cup of coffee with Sean McVay, then you're going to be a head coach in the NFL".

The trend of younger head coaches with offensive backgrounds has continued, with the media regularly using the term the "Next Sean McVay" during hiring cycles. Some of these coaching hires worked directly with McVay in the past, including Kevin O'Connell (36), Liam Coen (39) and Mike LaFleur (38), each of whom served as the Rams' offensive coordinator before becoming an NFL head coach. While Mike McDaniel (38) did not serve under McVay before becoming head coach the Miami Dolphins in 2022, he was part of the Washington coaching staff from 2011 to 2013 alongside McVay, Matt LaFleur and Kyle Shanahan, another relatively young offensive-minded head coach who was hired at the age of 37 by the San Francisco 49ers less than a month after McVay was hired by the Rams in 2017. Sando would later call this phenomenon a "coaching youth revolution" that reshaped the NFL.

Eventually, this movement would also be associated to the hiring of relatively younger head coaches that focused on defensive strategy as well. After spending one season as McVay's defensive coordinator on the Rams, Brandon Staley (38) was hired in the 2021 offseason as head coach of the crosstown Los Angeles Chargers. Upon his hiring, Staley was touted as being "the Sean McVay of defense", in that he was also a "young, bright mind that sees it all, that can communicate with people".

McVay's maintained his status as the NFL's youngest active head coach for seven straight years, despite the many young head coaches hired during this period. This distinction would eventually be taken by Jerod Mayo (37) when he was hired as head coach for the New England Patriots in 2024; Mayo was a month younger than McVay. Following this, hiring head coaches younger than McVay became a common occurrence.

=== Coordinators and assistant coaches ===
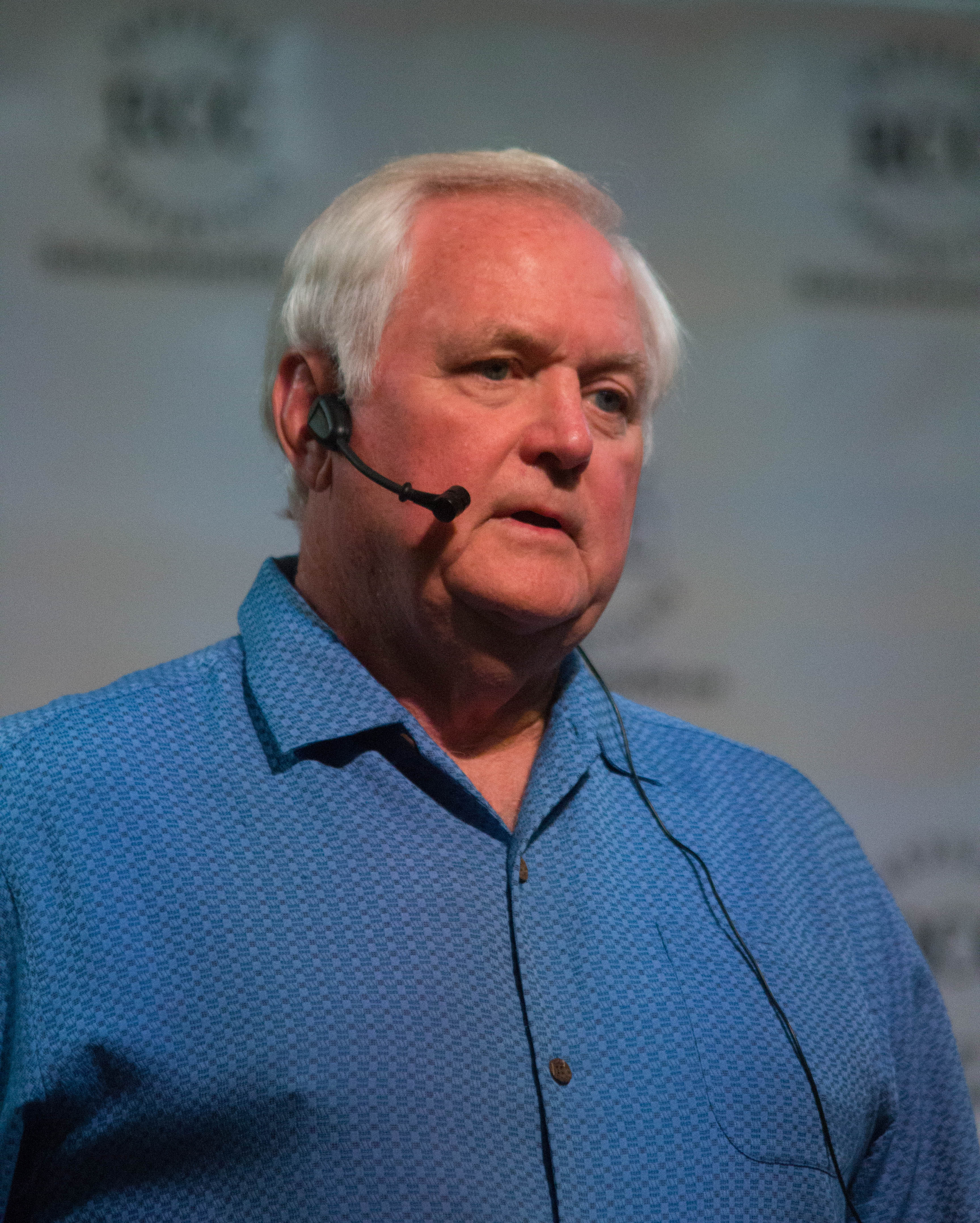
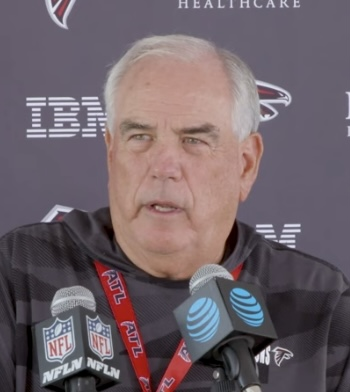
Front offices would often pair their younger offensive head coaches with older, more experienced defensive coordinators such as Wade Phillips (left) and Dean Pees (right).

Front offices have tried to counterbalance this practice of hiring younger and inexperienced offensive head coaches by hiring older and more seasoned defensive coordinators. When McVay was first hired by the Rams, he was paired with veteran defensive coordinator Wade Phillips, who was months from turning 70 and nearly four decades older than McVay. Similar examples include the Minnesota Vikings hiring Ed Donatell (65) as defensive coordinator when O'Connell became their head coach, and the Atlanta Falcons hiring Dean Pees (71) to pair with their new head coach Arthur Smith (38).

Additionally, McVay, as well as Shanahan, regularly hired younger coaches to their staffs. With their young top coordinators frequently getting hired in the offseason, both head coaches often elevated their young lower-level assistants to fill those roles. Several of McVay's assistants were also regularly hired for offensive, defensive or special teams coordinator positions on other teams, including Shane Waldron, Joe Barry, Ejiro Evero, Wes Phillips, Dwayne Stukes and Matt Daniels. Seattle Seahawks quarterback Russell Wilson reportedly favored hiring Waldron, who was then the Rams' passing game coordinator, as the Seahawks' offensive coordinator due to his experience on McVay's coaching staff and familiarity with McVay's offensive system. Waldron was also previously considered for the Cincinnati Bengals head coaching position that eventually went to Taylor.

== Impact ==
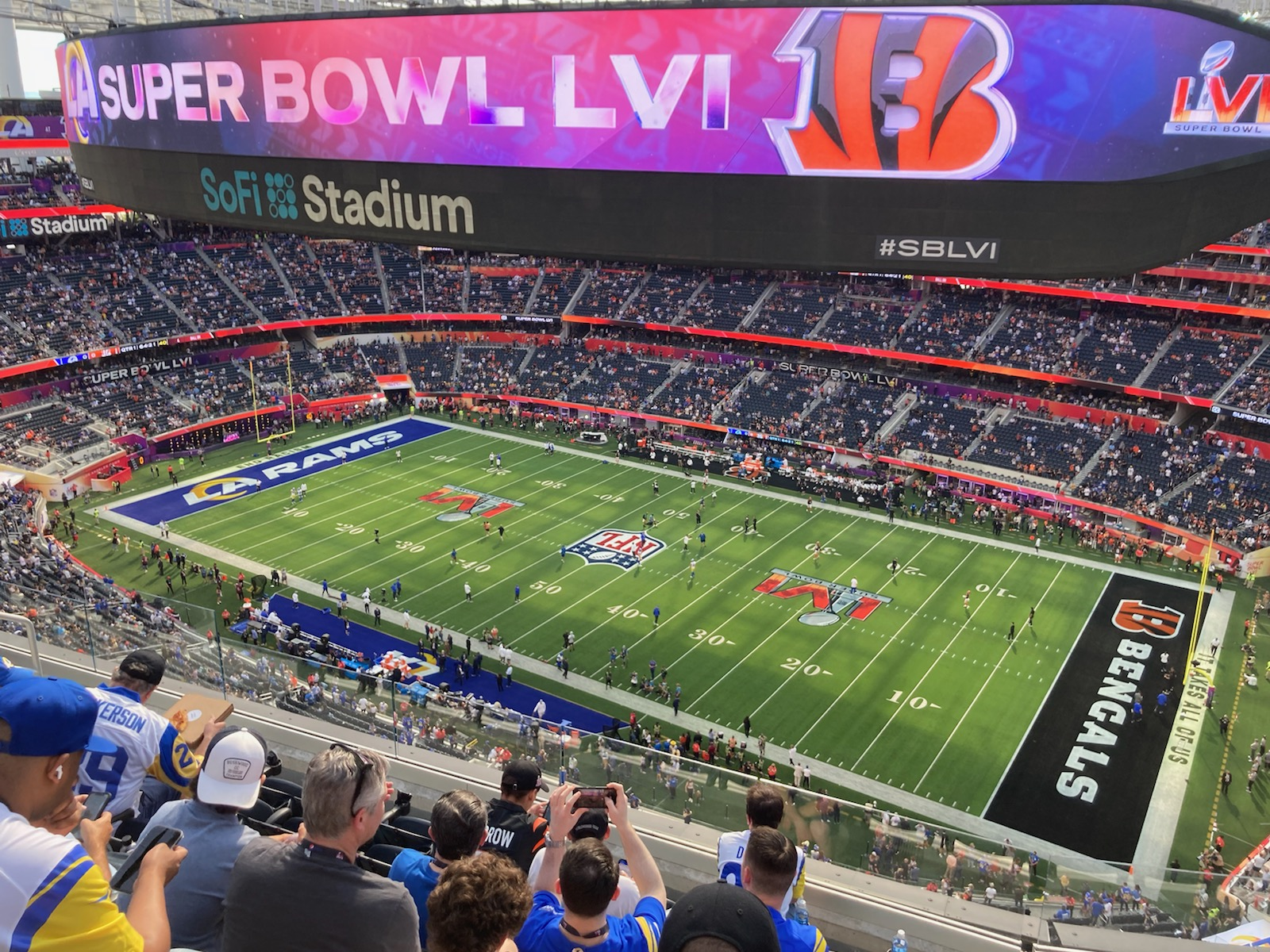
Super Bowl LVI featured Sean McVay's Rams against Zac Taylor's Bengals in the youngest Super Bowl head coaching matchup in history.

Sean McVay and Cincinnati Bengals head coach Zac Taylor — aged 36 and 38, respectively — met in Super Bowl LVI on February 13, 2022. It was McVay's second appearance at the Super Bowl and Taylor's first as a head coach, although Taylor was on the Rams' coaching staff during McVay's previous appearance. With McVay and Taylor combining for an age of 74, it marked the youngest-ever head coaching matchup in Super Bowl history. The Rams defeated the Bengals by a score of 23–20, resulting in McVay becoming the youngest head coach to ever win a Super Bowl.

For decades prior to McVay joining the Rams, hiring younger NFL head coaches was rare, as twenty-two head coaches aged 40 or younger were hired from 1990 to 2016. Conversely, fifteen different head coaches in the same age bracket were hired from 2017, the year McVay was hired, to 2022, the year after he won the Super Bowl. During the seven years before McVay was hired, only 6% of head coaching vacancies were filled by coaches in their thirties; this number grew to 36% in the seven years after McVay was hired. As a result, the average age for an NFL head coach decreased from 53.4 to 47.7 years old from 2015 to the start of the 2024 season. At the end of that span, NFL coaches on average would be significantly younger than the coaches and managers of the major professional sports leagues in the United States and Canada. Despite the trend, as well as McVay's Super Bowl win, there has been little correlation between the age of a head coach and the success of his team. From 2000 to 2024, teams with a head coach under the age 50 have a combined winning percentage of .504. Meanwhile, teams with coaches over the age of 50 during the same timespan have a winning percentage of .500.

This trend has also been linked to the increased turnover for NFL head coaches. For five years leading up to the 2025 offseason, 22 of the league's 32 teams changed head coaches, including 11 who made multiple hires during that time. With more coaching vacancies, owners were willing to take bigger chances with younger coaches. Mike Sando of The Athletic theorized that younger coaches costing less in salary makes them more appealing to owners, while an older offensive coach who spoke to Sando mentioned that newer head coaches are less likely to challenge or demand control from front offices.

Jed Hughes of sports management firm Korn Ferry also attributed the increased opportunities to McVay and San Francisco 49ers head coach Kyle Shanahan's practices of hiring younger coaches to their staff and their subsequent team successes. By the start of the 2024 season, the league employed hundreds of coaches in their thirties at all levels but also 39 full-time assistants in their twenties. This newer practice of younger coaching staffs has also caused the average age of offensive coordinators to plummet. In 2005, there were 13 offensive coordinators over 55, in 2025 there are only three, causing the average age of offensive coordinators to decrease from 53 to 43 in that timeframe. Many current offensive coaches believe they will no longer be considered for coordinator positions by the time they reach their fifties and instead fall into "senior assistant" roles by then.

It has been noted by some that this shift of younger, offensive coaches being hired has come at the expense of older coaches and coaches that specialized in defensive strategy. Three-quarters of available head coaching jobs went to offensive coaches between 2017 and 2019. By the end of that period only 10 out of 32 NFL coaches had defensive backgrounds. This has also been linked to the trend of front offices pairing younger offensive head coach with older defensive coordinators, as it has made it more difficult for younger defensive coaches to find coordinator positions, let alone ones for head coaches. During 2019, the average age of defensive coordinators was 55.1, but lowered to 48 in 2025 as Wade Phillips, Dean Pees and other veterans have left the NFL coaching ranks.

Others have noted that this trend has done little to support hiring candidates from ethnic-minority backgrounds, an ongoing issue in the NFL. During the 2019 offseason when Taylor and Matt LaFleur were hired, only one of the eight open head coaching positions went to an African-American coach. Stephen Holder of The Athletic reported that in the 2021 season, there were more former McVay assistants serving in top positions than there were African-American head coaches. This has also been attributed to the lack of minorities on offensive coaching staffs, as 86% of the offensive coordinators between 1999 and 2021 have been Caucasian.

== Head coaching hires attributed to the "Sean McVay effect" ==
Offensive coaches
Name	Age	Season	Team	Refs
Matt Nagy	39	2018	Chicago Bears	
Matt LaFleur	39	2019	Green Bay Packers	
Kliff Kingsbury	39	2019	Arizona Cardinals	
Adam Gase	40	2019	New York Jets	
Freddie Kitchens	44	2019	Cleveland Browns	
Zac Taylor	35	2019	Cincinnati Bengals	
Matt Rhule	44	2020	Carolina Panthers	
Joe Judge	38	2020	New York Giants	
Kevin Stefanski	37	2020	Cleveland Browns	
Arthur Smith	38	2021	Atlanta Falcons	
Nick Sirianni	39	2021	Philadelphia Eagles	
Nathaniel Hackett	42	2022	Denver Broncos	
Brian Daboll	46	2022	New York Giants	
Mike McDaniel	38	2022	Miami Dolphins	
Kevin O'Connell	36	2022	Minnesota Vikings	
Shane Steichen	37	2023	Indianapolis Colts	
Brian Callahan	39	2024	Tennessee Titans	
Dave Canales	42	2024	Carolina Panthers	
Ben Johnson	38	2025	Chicago Bears	
Liam Coen	39	2025	Jacksonville Jaguars	
Kellen Moore	36	2025	New Orleans Saints	
Joe Brady	36	2026	Buffalo Bills	
Mike LaFleur	38	2026	Arizona Cardinals	
Klint Kubiak	38	2026	Las Vegas Raiders	

Defensive coaches
Name	Age	Season	Team	Refs
Brandon Staley	38	2021	Los Angeles Chargers	
DeMeco Ryans	38	2023	Houston Texans	
Jonathan Gannon	40	2023	Arizona Cardinals	
Jerod Mayo	37	2024	New England Patriots	
Raheem Morris	47	2024	Atlanta Falcons	
Mike Macdonald	36	2024	Seattle Seahawks	
Jesse Minter	42	2026	Baltimore Ravens	
