= Seifer =

Seifer is a surname, sometimes used as a given name.

== People with this name ==
- Eugénie Seifer Olson, American author
- Marc Seifer (born 1948), American author and professor of psychology
- Reed Seifer (born 1973), American artist

== Fictional characters ==
- Seifer Almasy in the video game Final Fantasy VIII

== See also ==
- sefer, Hebrew word for book
- Seifert, German surname
- Siefert, a similar surname
