= Seiffert =

Seiffert is a surname. Notable people with the surname include:

- Chase Seiffert (born 1991), American professional golfer
- Günther Seiffert (1937–2020), German racing driver
- John Seiffert (1905–1965), Australian politician
- Kurt Seiffert (born 1935), American Olympic champion rower
- Lisa Seiffert, on the List of Playboy Playmates of 2012
- Marjorie Allen Seiffert (1885–1970), American poet
- Max Seiffert (1868–1948), German musicologist
- Peter Seiffert (1954–2025), German tenor
- Rachel Seiffert (born 1971), British novelist

== See also ==
- Josepha Seyffert, better known as Josepha von Heydeck
- Seifert, a surname
- Seyfert (disambiguation)
- Siefert, a surname
