= List of NFL head coach wins leaders =

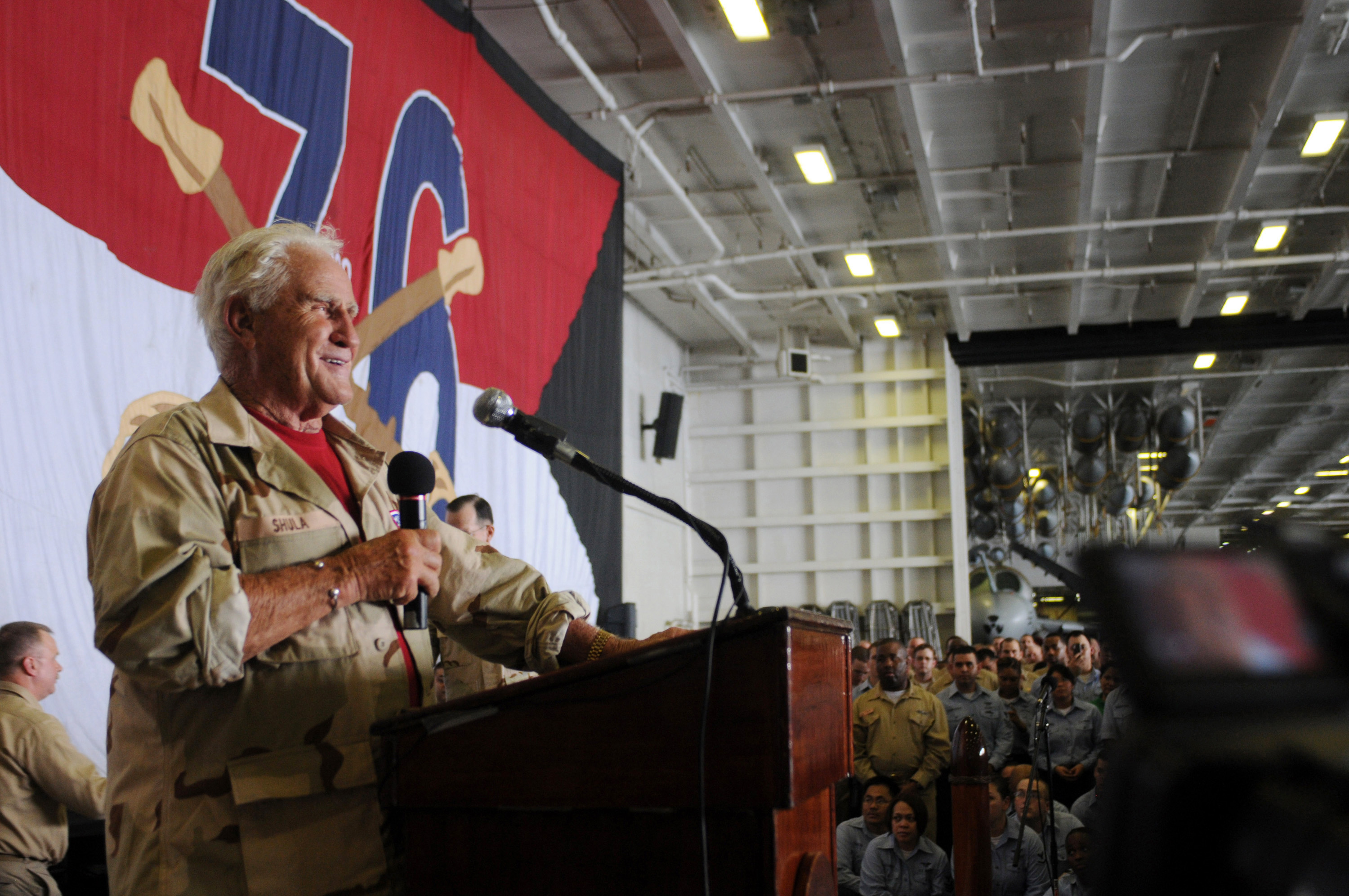
Don Shula, the winningest head coach in NFL history

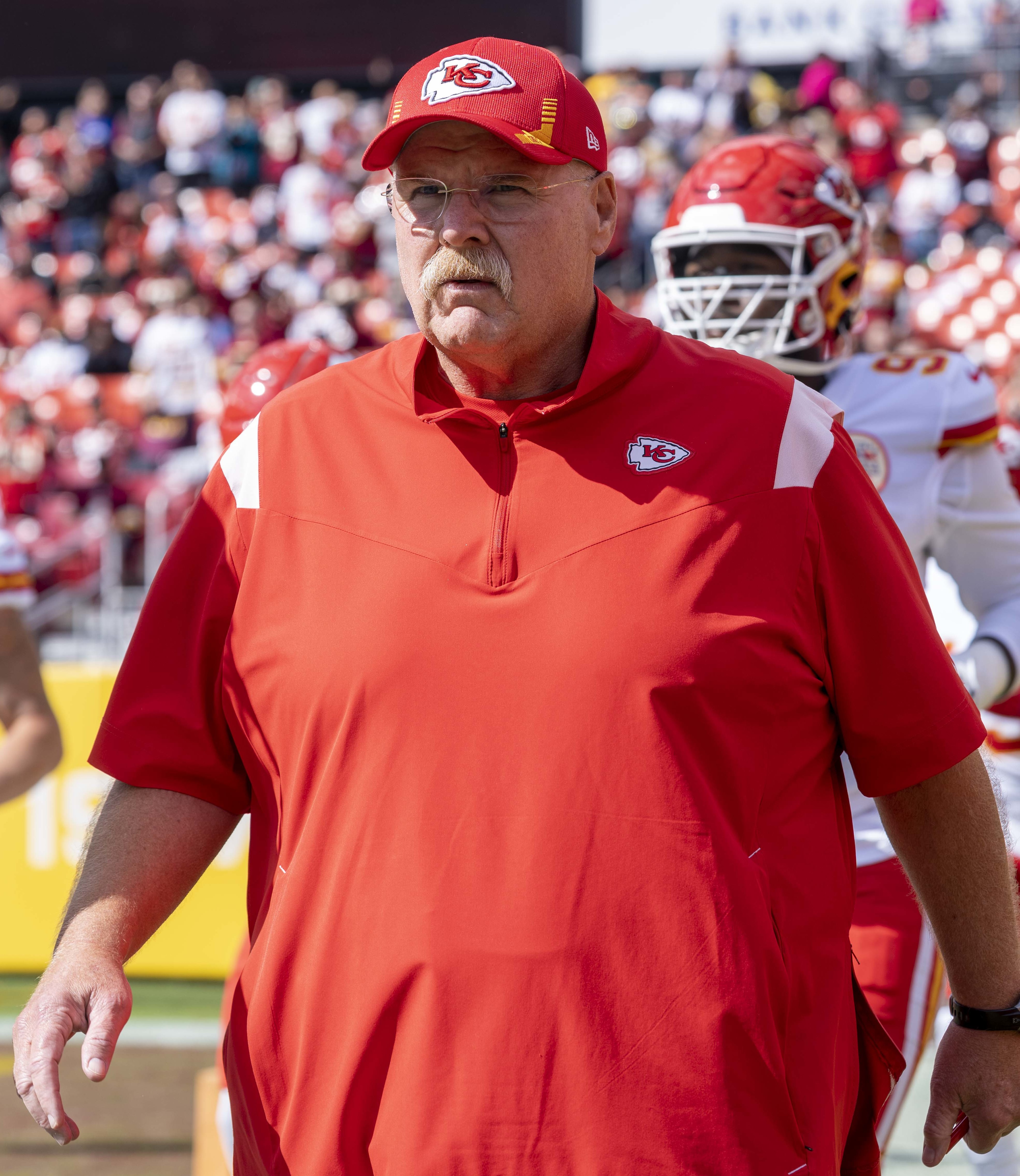
Andy Reid is the leader among active coaches in NFL head coach wins

The following is a list of the National Football League (NFL) head coaches by wins.

Don Shula holds the current records for regular season wins at 328. Shula’s tenure included many 14 game seasons, thus his win total took longer to amass than that of currently active coaches. Bill Belichick holds the record for postseason wins at 31.

Among active head coaches, Andy Reid is the leader in regular season and postseason wins.

== Regular season wins ==
This sortable table shows the top 100 NFL head coaches in order of total regular season wins. The table also shows every team for which he was a head coach and his record with each team. As of April 1, 2025 the NFL announced All-America Football Conference records and statistics will be recognized in its official records. The list now includes the AAFC totals.

When sorting by team, coaches are listed in order of wins for that team.

Teams Grouped Together:

- Arizona, St. Louis, and Chicago Cardinals
- Chicago Bears, Staleys, and Decatur Staleys
- Detroit Lions and Portsmouth Spartans
- Indianapolis and Baltimore Colts
- Kansas City Chiefs and Dallas Texans
- Las Vegas, Oakland, and Los Angeles Raiders
- Los Angeles and San Diego Chargers
- Los Angeles, St. Louis, and Cleveland Rams
- New England and Boston Patriots
- Tennessee Titans, Oilers, and Houston Oilers
- Washington Commanders, Football Team, Redskins, and Boston Redskins

Key
^ Inducted into the Pro Football Hall of Fame as a head coach
~ Inducted into the Pro Football Hall of Fame as a player
* Active head coach
Head coach with most wins for team

Rank	Coach	Career wins	Career losses	Career ties	Career win % ^{[A]}	Team(s)	Seasons	W	L	T
1	Don Shula ^	328	156	6	.677	Baltimore Colts	1963–1969	71	23	4
1	Don Shula ^	328	156	6	.677	Miami Dolphins	1970–1995	257	133	2
2	George Halas ^	318	148	31	.682	Decatur / Chicago Staleys / Bears	1920–1929, 1933–1942, 1946–1955, 1958–1967	318	148	31
3	Bill Belichick	302	165	0	.647	Cleveland Browns	1991–1995	36	44	0
3	Bill Belichick	302	165	0	.647	New England Patriots	2000–2023	266	121	0
4	Andy Reid *	286	159	1	.642	Philadelphia Eagles	1999–2012	130	93	1
4	Andy Reid *	286	159	1	.642	Kansas City Chiefs	2013–present	156	66	0
5	Tom Landry ^	250	162	6	.607	Dallas Cowboys	1960–1988	250	162	6
6	Curly Lambeau ^	226	132	22	.631	Green Bay Packers	1921–1949	209	104	21
6	Curly Lambeau ^	226	132	22	.631	Chicago Cardinals	1950–1951	7	15	0
6	Curly Lambeau ^	226	132	22	.631	Washington Redskins	1952–1953	10	13	1
7	Paul Brown ^	213	104	9	.672	Cleveland Browns	1946–1962	158	48	8
7	Paul Brown ^	213	104	9	.672	Cincinnati Bengals	1968–1975	55	56	1
8	Marty Schottenheimer	200	126	1	.613	Cleveland Browns	1984–1988	44	27	0
8	Marty Schottenheimer	200	126	1	.613	Kansas City Chiefs	1989–1998	101	58	1
8	Marty Schottenheimer	200	126	1	.613	Washington Redskins	2001	8	8	0
8	Marty Schottenheimer	200	126	1	.613	San Diego Chargers	2002–2006	47	33	0
9	Chuck Noll ^	193	148	1	.566	Pittsburgh Steelers	1969–1991	193	148	1
9	Mike Tomlin	193	114	2	.628	Pittsburgh Steelers	2007–2025	193	114	2
11	Sean Payton *	191	110	0	.635	New Orleans Saints	2006–2011, 2013–2021	152	89	0
11	Sean Payton *	191	110	0	.635	Denver Broncos	2023–present	39	21	0
12	Dan Reeves	190	165	2	.535	Denver Broncos	1981–1992	110	73	1
12	Dan Reeves	190	165	2	.535	New York Giants	1993–1996	31	33	0
12	Dan Reeves	190	165	2	.535	Atlanta Falcons	1997–2003	49	59	1
13	Chuck Knox	186	147	1	.558	Los Angeles Rams	1973–1977, 1992–1994	69	48	1
13	Chuck Knox	186	147	1	.558	Buffalo Bills	1978–1982	37	36	0
13	Chuck Knox	186	147	1	.558	Seattle Seahawks	1983–1991	80	63	0
14	John Harbaugh *	185	116	1	.614	Baltimore Ravens	2008–2025	180	113	0
14	John Harbaugh *	185	116	1	.614	New York Giants	2026–present	5	3	1
15	Mike McCarthy *	180	115	2	.609	Green Bay Packers	2006–2018	125	77	2
15	Mike McCarthy *	180	115	2	.609	Dallas Cowboys	2020–2024	49	35	0
15	Mike McCarthy *	180	115	2	.609	Pittsburgh Steelers	2026–present	6	3	0
16	Pete Carroll	173	134	1	.563	New York Jets	1994	6	10	0
16	Pete Carroll	173	134	1	.563	New England Patriots	1997–1999	27	21	0
16	Pete Carroll	173	134	1	.563	Seattle Seahawks	2010–2023	137	89	1
16	Pete Carroll	173	134	1	.563	Las Vegas Raiders	2025	3	14	0
16	Jeff Fisher	173	165	1	.512	Houston / Tennessee Oilers / Titans	1994–2010	142	120	0
16	Jeff Fisher	173	165	1	.512	St. Louis / Los Angeles Rams	2012–2016	31	45	1
18	Bill Parcells ^	172	130	1	.569	New York Giants	1983–1990	77	49	1
18	Bill Parcells ^	172	130	1	.569	New England Patriots	1993–1996	32	32	0
18	Bill Parcells ^	172	130	1	.569	New York Jets	1997–1999	29	19	0
18	Bill Parcells ^	172	130	1	.569	Dallas Cowboys	2003–2006	34	30	0
19	Mike Shanahan	170	138	0	.552	Los Angeles Raiders	1988–1989	8	12	0
19	Mike Shanahan	170	138	0	.552	Denver Broncos	1996–2008	138	86	0
19	Mike Shanahan	170	138	0	.552	Washington Redskins	2010–2013	24	40	0
19	Tom Coughlin	170	150	0	.531	Jacksonville Jaguars	1995–2002	68	60	0
19	Tom Coughlin	170	150	0	.531	New York Giants	2004–2015	102	90	0
21	Mike Holmgren	161	111	0	.592	Green Bay Packers	1992–1998	75	37	0
21	Mike Holmgren	161	111	0	.592	Seattle Seahawks	1999–2008	86	74	0
22	Bud Grant ^	158	96	5	.621	Minnesota Vikings	1967–1983, 1985	158	96	5
23	Joe Gibbs ^	154	94	0	.621	Washington Redskins	1981–1992, 2004–2007	154	94	0
24	Steve Owen ^	153	100	17	.605	New York Giants	1931–1953	153	100	17
25	Bill Cowher ^	149	90	1	.623	Pittsburgh Steelers	1992–2006	149	90	1
26	Marv Levy ^	143	112	0	.561	Kansas City Chiefs	1978–1982	31	42	0
26	Marv Levy ^	143	112	0	.561	Buffalo Bills	1986–1997	112	70	0
27	Tony Dungy ^	139	69	0	.668	Tampa Bay Buccaneers	1996–2001	54	42	0
27	Tony Dungy ^	139	69	0	.668	Indianapolis Colts	2002–2008	85	27	0
28	John Fox	133	123	0	.520	Carolina Panthers	2002–2010	73	71	0
28	John Fox	133	123	0	.520	Denver Broncos	2011–2014	46	18	0
28	John Fox	133	123	0	.520	Chicago Bears	2015–2017	14	34	0
29	Marvin Lewis	131	122	3	.518	Cincinnati Bengals	2003–2018	131	122	3
29	Hank Stram ^	131	97	10	.574	Dallas Texans / Kansas City Chiefs	1960–1974	124	76	10
29	Hank Stram ^	131	97	10	.574	New Orleans Saints	1976–1977	7	21	0
31	Weeb Ewbank ^	130	129	7	.502	Baltimore Colts	1954–1962	59	52	1
31	Weeb Ewbank ^	130	129	7	.502	New York Jets	1963–1973	71	77	6
32	Jim Mora	125	106	0	.541	New Orleans Saints	1986–1996	93	74	0
32	Jim Mora	125	106	0	.541	Indianapolis Colts	1998–2001	32	32	0
33	Sid Gillman ^	122	99	7	.552	Los Angeles Rams	1955–1959	28	31	1
33	Sid Gillman ^	122	99	7	.552	Los Angeles / San Diego Chargers	1960–1969, 1971	86	53	6
33	Sid Gillman ^	122	99	7	.552	Houston Oilers	1973–1974	8	15	0
34	Mike Ditka ~	121	95	0	.560	Chicago Bears	1982–1992	106	62	0
34	Mike Ditka ~	121	95	0	.560	New Orleans Saints	1997–1999	15	33	0
35	Dick Vermeil ^	120	109	0	.524	Philadelphia Eagles	1976–1982	54	47	0
35	Dick Vermeil ^	120	109	0	.524	St. Louis Rams	1997–1999	22	26	0
35	Dick Vermeil ^	120	109	0	.524	Kansas City Chiefs	2001–2005	44	36	0
36	Jon Gruden	117	112	0	.511	Oakland / Las Vegas Raiders	1998–2001, 2018–2021	60	57	0
36	Jon Gruden	117	112	0	.511	Tampa Bay Buccaneers	2002–2008	57	55	0
37	George Allen ^	116	47	5	.712	Los Angeles Rams	1966–1970	49	17	4
37	George Allen ^	116	47	5	.712	Washington Redskins	1971–1977	67	30	1
38	George Seifert	114	62	0	.648	San Francisco 49ers	1989–1996	98	30	0
38	George Seifert	114	62	0	.648	Carolina Panthers	1999–2001	16	32	0
38	Norv Turner	114	122	1	.483	Washington Redskins	1994–2000	49	59	1
38	Norv Turner	114	122	1	.483	Oakland Raiders	2004–2005	9	23	0
38	Norv Turner	114	122	1	.483	San Diego Chargers	2007–2012	56	40	0
40	Dennis Green	113	94	0	.546	Minnesota Vikings	1992–2001	97	62	0
40	Dennis Green	113	94	0	.546	Arizona Cardinals	2004–2006	16	32	0
41	Don Coryell ^	111	83	1	.572	St. Louis Cardinals	1973–1977	42	27	1
41	Don Coryell ^	111	83	1	.572	San Diego Chargers	1978–1986	69	56	0
42	Buddy Parker	104	75	9	.581	Chicago Cardinals	1949	6	5	1
42	Buddy Parker	104	75	9	.581	Detroit Lions	1951–1956	47	23	2
42	Buddy Parker	104	75	9	.581	Pittsburgh Steelers	1957–1964	51	47	6
43	John Madden ^	103	32	7	.759	Oakland Raiders	1969–1978	103	32	7
44	Ron Rivera	102	103	2	.498	Carolina Panthers	2011–2019	76	63	1
44	Ron Rivera	102	103	2	.498	Washington Football Team / Commanders	2020–2023	26	40	1
45	Sean McDermott	98	50	0	.662	Buffalo Bills	2017–2025	98	50	0
45	Sean McVay *	98	61	0	.616	Los Angeles Rams	2017–present	98	61	0
47	Tom Flores ^	97	87	0	.527	Oakland Raiders	1979–1987	83	53	0
47	Tom Flores ^	97	87	0	.527	Seattle Seahawks	1992–1994	14	34	0
48	Vince Lombardi ^	96	34	6	.738	Green Bay Packers	1959–1967	89	29	4
48	Vince Lombardi ^	96	34	6	.738	Washington Redskins	1969	7	5	2
49	Lou Saban	95	99	7	.490	Boston Patriots	1960–1961	7	12	0
49	Lou Saban	95	99	7	.490	Buffalo Bills	1962–1965, 1972–1976	68	45	4
49	Lou Saban	95	99	7	.490	Denver Broncos	1967–1971	20	42	3
50	Jack Del Rio	93	94	0	.497	Jacksonville Jaguars	2003–2011	68	71	0
50	Jack Del Rio	93	94	0	.497	Oakland Raiders	2015–2017	25	23	0
51	Lovie Smith	92	100	1	.479	Chicago Bears	2004–2012	81	63	0
51	Lovie Smith	92	100	1	.479	Tampa Bay Buccaneers	2014–2015	8	24	0
51	Lovie Smith	92	100	1	.479	Houston Texans	2022	3	13	1
51	Bill Walsh ^	92	59	1	.609	San Francisco 49ers	1979–1988	92	59	1
53	Buck Shaw	90	55	5	.621	San Francisco 49ers	1946–1954	71	39	4
53	Buck Shaw	90	55	5	.621	Philadelphia Eagles	1958–1960	19	16	1
53	Kyle Shanahan *	90	68	0	.570	San Francisco 49ers	2017–present	90	68	0
55	Jimmy Conzelman ^	87	63	17	.580	Rock Island Independents	1921–1922	8	3	2
55	Jimmy Conzelman ^	87	63	17	.580	Milwaukee Badgers	1922–1923	7	5	3
55	Jimmy Conzelman ^	87	63	17	.580	Detroit Panthers	1925–1926	12	8	4
55	Jimmy Conzelman ^	87	63	17	.580	Providence Steam Roller	1927–1930	26	16	6
55	Jimmy Conzelman ^	87	63	17	.580	Chicago Cardinals	1940–1942, 1946–1948	34	31	2
55	Ted Marchibroda	87	98	1	.470	Baltimore / Indianapolis Colts	1975–1979, 1992–1995	71	67	0
55	Ted Marchibroda	87	98	1	.470	Baltimore Ravens	1996–1998	16	31	1
55	Jack Pardee	87	77	0	.530	Chicago Bears	1975–1977	20	22	0
55	Jack Pardee	87	77	0	.530	Washington Redskins	1978–1980	24	24	0
55	Jack Pardee	87	77	0	.530	Houston Oilers	1990–1994	43	31	0
58	Jason Garrett	85	67	0	.559	Dallas Cowboys	2010–2019	85	67	0
59	Sam Wyche	84	107	0	.440	Cincinnati Bengals	1984–1991	61	66	0
59	Sam Wyche	84	107	0	.440	Tampa Bay Buccaneers	1992–1995	23	41	0
60	Gary Kubiak	82	75	0	.522	Houston Texans	2006–2013	61	64	0
60	Gary Kubiak	82	75	0	.522	Denver Broncos	2015–2016	21	11	0
60	Bum Phillips	82	77	0	.516	Houston Oilers	1975–1980	55	35	0
60	Bum Phillips	82	77	0	.516	New Orleans Saints	1981–1985	27	42	0
60	Wade Phillips	82	64	0	.562	New Orleans Saints	1985	1	3	0
60	Wade Phillips	82	64	0	.562	Denver Broncos	1993–1994	16	16	0
60	Wade Phillips	82	64	0	.562	Buffalo Bills	1998–2000	29	19	0
60	Wade Phillips	82	64	0	.562	Atlanta Falcons	2003	2	1	0
60	Wade Phillips	82	64	0	.562	Dallas Cowboys	2007–2010	34	22	0
60	Wade Phillips	82	64	0	.562	Houston Texans	2013	0	3	0
60	Dave Wannstedt	82	87	0	.485	Chicago Bears	1993–1998	40	56	0
60	Dave Wannstedt	82	87	0	.485	Miami Dolphins	2000–2004	42	31	0
60	Matt LaFleur *	82	44	1	.650	Green Bay Packers	2019–present	82	44	1
65	Bruce Arians	80	48	1	.624	Arizona Cardinals	2013–2017	49	30	1
65	Bruce Arians	80	48	1	.624	Tampa Bay Buccaneers	2019–2021	31	18	0
65	Brian Billick	80	64	0	.556	Baltimore Ravens	1999–2007	80	64	0
65	Ray Flaherty ^	80	37	5	.684	Boston / Washington Redskins	1936–1942	54	21	3
65	Ray Flaherty ^	80	37	5	.684	New York Yankees	1946–1948	22	8	2
65	Ray Flaherty ^	80	37	5	.684	Chicago Hornets	1949	4	8	0
65	Jimmy Johnson ^	80	64	0	.556	Dallas Cowboys	1989–1993	44	36	0
65	Jimmy Johnson ^	80	64	0	.556	Miami Dolphins	1996–1999	36	28	0
69	Blanton Collier	76	34	2	.691	Cleveland Browns	1963–1970	76	34	2
70	John Robinson	75	68	0	.524	Los Angeles Rams	1983–1991	75	68	0
70	Forrest Gregg ~	75	85	1	.469	Cleveland Browns	1975–1977	18	23	0
70	Forrest Gregg ~	75	85	1	.469	Cincinnati Bengals	1980–1983	32	25	0
70	Forrest Gregg ~	75	85	1	.469	Green Bay Packers	1984–1987	25	37	1
72	Bobby Ross	74	63	0	.540	San Diego Chargers	1992–1996	47	33	0
72	Bobby Ross	74	63	0	.540	Detroit Lions	1997–2000	27	30	0
73	Mike Vrabel *	73	53	0	.576	Tennessee Titans	2018–2023	54	45	0
73	Mike Vrabel *	73	53	0	.576	New England Patriots	2025–present	19	8	0
74	Steve Mariucci	72	67	0	.518	San Francisco 49ers	1997–2002	57	39	0
74	Steve Mariucci	72	67	0	.518	Detroit Lions	2003–2005	15	28	0
74	Mike Zimmer	72	56	1	.562	Minnesota Vikings	2014–2021	72	56	1
76	Dick Nolan	69	82	5	.457	San Francisco 49ers	1968–1975	54	53	5
76	Dick Nolan	69	82	5	.457	New Orleans Saints	1978–1980	15	29	0
77	George Wilson	68	84	8	.447	Detroit Lions	1957–1964	53	45	6
77	George Wilson	68	84	8	.447	Miami Dolphins	1966–1969	15	39	2
78	Jim Harbaugh *	67	39	1	.631	San Francisco 49ers	2011–2014	44	19	1
78	Jim Harbaugh *	67	39	1	.631	Los Angeles Chargers	2024–present	23	20	0
79	Mike Smith	66	46	0	.589	Atlanta Falcons	2008–2014	66	46	0
79	Wayne Fontes	66	67	0	.496	Detroit Lions	1988–1996	66	67	0
79	Norm Van Brocklin ~	66	100	7	.398	Minnesota Vikings	1961–1966	29	51	4
79	Norm Van Brocklin ~	66	100	7	.398	Atlanta Falcons	1968–1974	37	49	0
82	Potsy Clark	64	42	12	.604	Portsmouth Spartans / Detroit Lions	1931–1936, 1940	53	25	7
82	Potsy Clark	64	42	12	.604	Brooklyn Dodgers	1937–1939	11	17	5
82	Wally Lemm	64	64	7	.500	Houston Oilers	1961, 1966–1970	37	38	4
82	Wally Lemm	64	64	7	.500	St. Louis Cardinals	1962–1965	27	26	3
82	Doug Pederson	64	66	1	.488	Philadelphia Eagles	2016–2020	42	37	1
82	Doug Pederson	64	66	1	.488	Jacksonville Jaguars	2022–2024	22	29	0
82	Todd Bowles *	64	80	0	.444	Miami Dolphins	2011	2	1	0
82	Todd Bowles *	64	80	0	.444	New York Jets	2015–2018	24	40	0
82	Todd Bowles *	64	80	0	.444	Tampa Bay Buccaneers	2022–present	38	39	0
86	Greasy Neale ^	63	43	5	.594	Philadelphia Eagles	1941–1950	63	43	5
86	Dan Quinn *	63	64	1	.496	Atlanta Falcons	2015–2020	43	42	0
86	Dan Quinn *	63	64	1	.496	Washington Commanders	2024–present	20	22	1
88	Jim Caldwell	62	50	0	.554	Indianapolis Colts	2009–2011	26	22	0
88	Jim Caldwell	62	50	0	.554	Detroit Lions	2014–2017	36	28	0
89	Rex Ryan	61	66	0	.480	New York Jets	2009–2014	46	50	0
89	Rex Ryan	61	66	0	.480	Buffalo Bills	2015–2016	15	16	0
89	Nick Sirianni *	61	33	0	.649	Philadelphia Eagles	2021–present	61	33	0
91	Jerry Glanville	60	69	0	.465	Houston Oilers	1985–1989	33	32	0
91	Jerry Glanville	60	69	0	.465	Atlanta Falcons	1990–1993	27	37	0
91	Dick Jauron	60	82	0	.423	Chicago Bears	1999–2003	35	45	0
91	Dick Jauron	60	82	0	.423	Detroit Lions	2005	1	4	0
91	Dick Jauron	60	82	0	.423	Buffalo Bills	2006–2009	24	33	0
91	Dan Campbell *	60	45	1	.571	Miami Dolphins	2015	5	7	0
91	Dan Campbell *	60	45	1	.571	Detroit Lions	2021–present	55	38	1
94	Zac Taylor *	59	65	1	.476	Cincinnati Bengals	2019–present	59	65	1
95	Guy Chamberlin ^	58	16	7	.784	Canton Bulldogs	1922–1923	21	0	3
95	Guy Chamberlin ^	58	16	7	.784	Cleveland Bulldogs	1924	7	1	1
95	Guy Chamberlin ^	58	16	7	.784	Frankford Yellow Jackets	1925–1926	27	8	2
95	Guy Chamberlin ^	58	16	7	.784	Chicago Cardinals	1927	3	7	0
95	Jim Fassel	58	53	1	.522	New York Giants	1997–2003	58	53	1
95	Joe Kuharich	58	81	3	.419	Chicago Cardinals	1952	4	8	0
95	Joe Kuharich	58	81	3	.419	Washington Redskins	1954–1958	26	32	2
95	Joe Kuharich	58	81	3	.419	Philadelphia Eagles	1964–1968	28	41	1
98	Mike Sherman	57	39	0	.594	Green Bay Packers	2000–2005	57	39	0
98	Allie Sherman	57	51	4	.528	New York Giants	1961–1968	57	51	4
100	Art Shell ~	56	52	0	.519	Los Angeles / Oakland Raiders	1989–1994, 2006	56	52	0
Rank	Coach	Career wins	Career losses	Career ties	Career win % ^{[A]}	Team(s)	Seasons	W	L	T

Notes

- ^{A} The NFL did not officially count ties in the standings until 1972. Therefore, ties occurring prior to 1972 do not count toward a coach's win percentage, while ties occurring 1972 or later count as half-win, half-loss.

== Postseason wins ==
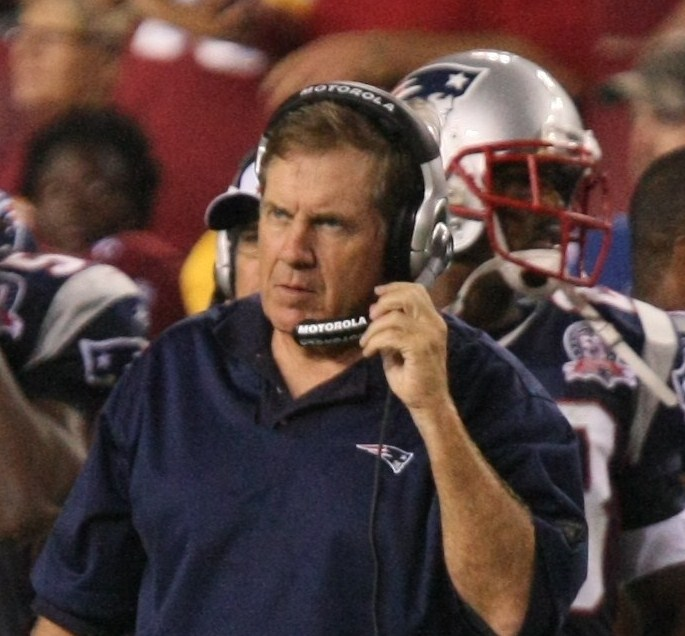
Bill Belichick holds the record for playoff wins with 31.

Key
^ Inducted into the Pro Football Hall of Fame as a head coach
~ Inducted into the Pro Football Hall of Fame as a player
* Active head coach

Rank	Coach	Wins
1	Bill Belichick	31
2	* Andy Reid	28
3	^ Tom Landry	20
4	^ Don Shula	19
5	^ Joe Gibbs	17
6	^ Chuck Noll	16
7	Mike Holmgren	13
7	* John Harbaugh	13
9	Tom Coughlin	12
9	^ Bill Cowher	12
11	Pete Carroll	11
11	^ Marv Levy	11
11	* Mike McCarthy	11
11	^ Bill Parcells	11
11	Dan Reeves	11
16	^ Bud Grant	10
16	George Seifert	10
16	^ Bill Walsh	10
16	* Sean Payton	10
16	* Sean McVay	10
20	^ Paul Brown	9
20	^ Tony Dungy	9
20	^ Jimmy Johnson	9
20	^ Vince Lombardi	9
20	^ John Madden	9
20	* Kyle Shanahan	9

== See also ==
- List of current NFL head coaches
- List of NFL head coaches by playoff record
- List of Super Bowl head coaches
