= Seifert =

Seifert is a German surname. Notable people with the surname include:

- Alfred Seifert (1850–1901), Czech German painter
- Alfred Seifert (flax miller) (1877–1945), New Zealand flax-miller
- Alwin Seifert (1890–1972), German architect
- Benjamin Seifert (born 1982), German cross country skier
- Bernhard Seifert (born 1993), German javelin thrower
- Bernhard Seifert (entomologist) (born 1955), German entomologist
- Bill Seifert (born 1939), American racecar driver
- Christian Seifert (born 1969), German entrepreneur
- Christopher Seifert (1975–2003), American soldier
- Dario Seifert (born 1995), German politician
- Elena Seifert (born 1973), Kazakh-Russian poet, translator, literary critic, and journalist
- Else Seifert (1879–1968), German photographer
- Emil Seifert (1900–1973), Czech football manager
- Ernst Seifert (1855–1928), German organ builder
- Frank Seifert (born 1972), German footballer
- Friedrich Seifert (born 1941), German mineralogist
- George Seifert (born 1940), American football coach
- Harald Seifert (born 1953), East German bobsledder
- Hartmut Seifert (born 1944), German labor economist
- Heath Seifert (born 1968), American television writer
- Herbert Seifert (1897–1996), German mathematician
- Howard S. Seifert (1911–1977), American rocket propulsion authority
- Ilja Seifert (1951–2022), German politician
- Jan Seifert (born 1968), German footballer
- Jaroslav Seifert (1901–1986), Czech writer, poet, and journalist
- Jeremy Seifert, American filmmaker
- Jim Seifert (born 1956), American politician
- Johannes Seifert (1915–1943), German Luftwaffe ace
- Kathi Seifert, American businesswoman
- Kurt Seifert (1903–1950), German actor
- Lewis Seifert (born 1962), American academic
- Manfred Seifert (1949–2005), German football player
- Maria Seifert (born 1981), German Paralympian athlete
- Marty Seifert (born 1972), American politician
- Michael Seifert (disambiguation), multiple people
- Patrick Seifert (born 1990), German ice hockey player
- Rainer Seifert (born 1947), German field hockey player
- Richard Seifert (1910–2001), Swiss British architect
- Robert Seifert (born 1988), German speed-skater
- Robert O. Seifert, U.S. National Guard general
- Rudolf Seifert (born 1934), East German slalom canoer
- Sandra Seifert (born 1984), Taiwanese fashion model
- Sebastian Seifert (born 1978), Swedish handballer
- Shirley Seifert (1888–1971), American historical fiction author
- Stephen Seifert (born 1973), American folk musician
- Steve Seifert, American bassist of Groovy Rednecks
- Steven Seifert (1950–2022), American medical toxicologist
- Tim Seifert (born 1994), New Zealand cricketer
- Tim Seifert (footballer) (born 2002), German footballer
- Toni Seifert (born 1981), German rower
- Viva Seifert (born 1972), British musician and former gymnast
- Walter Seifert (1921–1964), German man who attacked a school
- Werner Seifert (born 1949), Swiss businessman
- Yvonne Seifert (born 1964), German skier
- Zbigniew Seifert (1946–1979), Polish jazz violinist

== See also ==
- Siebert
- Seyfert (disambiguation)
- Siefert
