= List of Super Bowl head coaches =

This is a list of Super Bowl head coaches.

== Super Bowl head coaches ==
Elected to Hall of Fame as Coach	Elected to Hall of Fame as Player	Active NFL Head Coach

(Win number in parentheses). [Loss number in brackets]. Click on heading arrows to sort table.

Date	Super Bowl	Winning coach	Team	Opponent	Losing coach	Score	Site
January 15, 1967	I	Vince Lombardi	Green Bay Packers	Kansas City Chiefs	Hank Stram	35–10	Los Angeles Memorial Coliseum in Los Angeles
January 14, 1968	II	Vince Lombardi (2)	Green Bay Packers	Oakland Raiders	John Rauch	33–14	Miami Orange Bowl in Miami, Florida
January 12, 1969	III	Weeb Ewbank	New York Jets	Baltimore Colts	Don Shula	16–7	Miami Orange Bowl in Miami, Florida
January 11, 1970	IV	Hank Stram	Kansas City Chiefs	Minnesota Vikings	Bud Grant	23–7	Tulane Stadium in New Orleans, Louisiana
January 17, 1971	V	Don McCafferty	Baltimore Colts	Dallas Cowboys	Tom Landry	16–13	Miami Orange Bowl in Miami, Florida
January 16, 1972	VI	Tom Landry	Dallas Cowboys	Miami Dolphins	Don Shula [2]	24–3	Tulane Stadium in New Orleans, Louisiana
January 14, 1973	VII	Don Shula	Miami Dolphins	Washington Redskins	George Allen	14–7	Los Angeles Memorial Coliseum in Los Angeles
January 13, 1974	VIII	Don Shula (2)	Miami Dolphins	Minnesota Vikings	Bud Grant [2]	24–7	Rice Stadium in Houston, Texas
January 12, 1975	IX	Chuck Noll	Pittsburgh Steelers	Minnesota Vikings	Bud Grant [3]	16–6	Tulane Stadium in New Orleans, Louisiana
January 18, 1976	X	Chuck Noll (2)	Pittsburgh Steelers	Dallas Cowboys	Tom Landry [2]	21–17	Miami Orange Bowl in Miami, Florida
January 9, 1977	XI	John Madden	Oakland Raiders	Minnesota Vikings	Bud Grant [4]	32–14	Rose Bowl Stadium in Pasadena, California
January 15, 1978	XII	Tom Landry (2)	Dallas Cowboys	Denver Broncos	Red Miller	27–10	Louisiana Superdome in New Orleans, Louisiana
January 21, 1979	XIII	Chuck Noll (3)	Pittsburgh Steelers	Dallas Cowboys	Tom Landry [3]	35–31	Miami Orange Bowl in Miami, Florida
January 20, 1980	XIV	Chuck Noll (4)	Pittsburgh Steelers	Los Angeles Rams	Ray Malavasi	31–19	Rose Bowl Stadium in Pasadena, California
January 25, 1981	XV	Tom Flores	Oakland Raiders	Philadelphia Eagles	Dick Vermeil	27–10	Louisiana Superdome in New Orleans, Louisiana
January 24, 1982	XVI	Bill Walsh	San Francisco 49ers	Cincinnati Bengals	Forrest Gregg	26–21	Pontiac Silverdome in Pontiac, Michigan
January 30, 1983	XVII	Joe Gibbs	Washington Redskins	Miami Dolphins	Don Shula [3]	27–17	Rose Bowl Stadium in Pasadena, California
January 22, 1984	XVIII	Tom Flores (2)	Los Angeles Raiders	Washington Redskins	Joe Gibbs	38–9	Tampa Stadium in Tampa, Florida
January 20, 1985	XIX	Bill Walsh (2)	San Francisco 49ers	Miami Dolphins	Don Shula [4]	38–16	Stanford Stadium in Palo Alto, California
January 26, 1986	XX	Mike Ditka	Chicago Bears	New England Patriots	Raymond Berry	46–10	Louisiana Superdome in New Orleans, Louisiana
January 25, 1987	XXI	Bill Parcells	New York Giants	Denver Broncos	Dan Reeves	39–20	Rose Bowl Stadium in Pasadena, California
January 31, 1988	XXII	Joe Gibbs (2)	Washington Redskins	Denver Broncos	Dan Reeves [2]	42–10	Jack Murphy Stadium in San Diego, California
January 22, 1989	XXIII	Bill Walsh (3)	San Francisco 49ers	Cincinnati Bengals	Sam Wyche	20–16	Joe Robbie Stadium in Miami, Florida
January 28, 1990	XXIV	George Seifert	San Francisco 49ers	Denver Broncos	Dan Reeves [3]	55–10	Louisiana Superdome in New Orleans, Louisiana
January 27, 1991	XXV	Bill Parcells (2)	New York Giants	Buffalo Bills	Marv Levy	20–19	Tampa Stadium in Tampa, Florida
January 26, 1992	XXVI	Joe Gibbs (3)	Washington Redskins	Buffalo Bills	Marv Levy [2]	37–24	Hubert H. Humphrey Metrodome in Minneapolis, Minnesota
January 31, 1993	XXVII	Jimmy Johnson	Dallas Cowboys	Buffalo Bills	Marv Levy [3]	52–17	Rose Bowl Stadium in Pasadena, California
January 30, 1994	XXVIII	Jimmy Johnson (2)	Dallas Cowboys	Buffalo Bills	Marv Levy [4]	30–13	Georgia Dome in Atlanta, Georgia
January 29, 1995	XXIX	George Seifert (2)	San Francisco 49ers	San Diego Chargers	Bobby Ross	49–26	Joe Robbie Stadium in Miami, Florida
January 28, 1996	XXX	Barry Switzer	Dallas Cowboys	Pittsburgh Steelers	Bill Cowher	27–17	Sun Devil Stadium in Tempe, Arizona
January 26, 1997	XXXI	Mike Holmgren	Green Bay Packers	New England Patriots	Bill Parcells	35–21	Louisiana Superdome in New Orleans, Louisiana
January 25, 1998	XXXII	Mike Shanahan	Denver Broncos	Green Bay Packers	Mike Holmgren	31–24	Qualcomm Stadium in San Diego, California
January 31, 1999	XXXIII	Mike Shanahan (2)	Denver Broncos	Atlanta Falcons	Dan Reeves [4]	34–19	Pro Player Stadium in Miami, Florida
January 30, 2000	XXXIV	Dick Vermeil	St. Louis Rams	Tennessee Titans	Jeff Fisher	23–16	Georgia Dome in Atlanta, Georgia
January 28, 2001	XXXV	Brian Billick	Baltimore Ravens	New York Giants	Jim Fassel	34–7	Raymond James Stadium in Tampa, Florida
February 3, 2002	XXXVI	Bill Belichick	New England Patriots	St. Louis Rams	Mike Martz	20–17	Louisiana Superdome in New Orleans, Louisiana
January 26, 2003	XXXVII	Jon Gruden	Tampa Bay Buccaneers	Oakland Raiders	Bill Callahan	48–21	Qualcomm Stadium in San Diego, California
February 1, 2004	XXXVIII	Bill Belichick (2)	New England Patriots	Carolina Panthers	John Fox	32–29	Reliant Stadium in Houston, Texas
February 6, 2005	XXXIX	Bill Belichick (3)	New England Patriots	Philadelphia Eagles	Andy Reid	24–21	Alltel Stadium in Jacksonville, Florida
February 5, 2006	XL	Bill Cowher	Pittsburgh Steelers	Seattle Seahawks	Mike Holmgren [2]	21–10	Ford Field in Detroit, Michigan
February 4, 2007	XLI	Tony Dungy	Indianapolis Colts	Chicago Bears	Lovie Smith	29–17	Dolphin Stadium in Miami Gardens, Florida
February 3, 2008	XLII	Tom Coughlin	New York Giants	New England Patriots	Bill Belichick	17–14	University of Phoenix Stadium in Glendale, Arizona
February 1, 2009	XLIII	Mike Tomlin	Pittsburgh Steelers	Arizona Cardinals	Ken Whisenhunt	27–23	Raymond James Stadium in Tampa, Florida
February 7, 2010	XLIV	Sean Payton	New Orleans Saints	Indianapolis Colts	Jim Caldwell	31–17	Sun Life Stadium in Miami Gardens, Florida
February 6, 2011	XLV	Mike McCarthy	Green Bay Packers	Pittsburgh Steelers	Mike Tomlin	31–25	Cowboys Stadium in Arlington, Texas
February 5, 2012	XLVI	Tom Coughlin (2)	New York Giants	New England Patriots	Bill Belichick [2]	21–17	Lucas Oil Stadium in Indianapolis, Indiana
February 3, 2013	XLVII	John Harbaugh	Baltimore Ravens	San Francisco 49ers	Jim Harbaugh	34–31	Mercedes-Benz Superdome in New Orleans, Louisiana
February 2, 2014	XLVIII	Pete Carroll	Seattle Seahawks	Denver Broncos	John Fox [2]	43–8	MetLife Stadium in East Rutherford, New Jersey
February 1, 2015	XLIX	Bill Belichick (4)	New England Patriots	Seattle Seahawks	Pete Carroll	28–24	University of Phoenix Stadium in Glendale, Arizona
February 7, 2016	50	Gary Kubiak	Denver Broncos	Carolina Panthers	Ron Rivera	24–10	Levi's Stadium in Santa Clara, California
February 5, 2017	LI	Bill Belichick (5)	New England Patriots	Atlanta Falcons	Dan Quinn	34–28 (OT)	NRG Stadium in Houston, Texas
February 4, 2018	LII	Doug Pederson	Philadelphia Eagles	New England Patriots	Bill Belichick [3]	41–33	U.S. Bank Stadium in Minneapolis, Minnesota
February 3, 2019	LIII	Bill Belichick (6)	New England Patriots	Los Angeles Rams	Sean McVay	13–3	Mercedes-Benz Stadium in Atlanta, Georgia
February 2, 2020	LIV	Andy Reid	Kansas City Chiefs	San Francisco 49ers	Kyle Shanahan	31–20	Hard Rock Stadium, Miami Gardens, Florida
February 7, 2021	LV	Bruce Arians	Tampa Bay Buccaneers	Kansas City Chiefs	Andy Reid [2]	31–9	Raymond James Stadium, Tampa, Florida
February 13, 2022	LVI	Sean McVay	Los Angeles Rams	Cincinnati Bengals	Zac Taylor	23–20	SoFi Stadium, Inglewood, California
February 12, 2023	LVII	Andy Reid (2)	Kansas City Chiefs	Philadelphia Eagles	Nick Sirianni	38–35	State Farm Stadium, Glendale, Arizona
February 11, 2024	LVIII	Andy Reid (3)	Kansas City Chiefs	San Francisco 49ers	Kyle Shanahan [2]	25–22 (OT)	Allegiant Stadium, Paradise, Nevada
February 9, 2025	LIX	Nick Sirianni	Philadelphia Eagles	Kansas City Chiefs	Andy Reid [3]	40–22	Caesars Superdome, New Orleans, Louisiana
February 8, 2026	LX	Mike Macdonald	Seattle Seahawks	New England Patriots	Mike Vrabel	29–13	Levi's Stadium, Santa Clara, California

== Coaches with multiple Super Bowl appearances ==
Elected to Hall of Fame as Coach	Active Coach

The following NFL head coaches have coached in two or more Super Bowls. Of eligible coaches not in the Hall of Fame, only three have had three or more appearances: Bill Belichick, Mike Holmgren and Dan Reeves. There are four eligible coaches with multiple wins to not be inducted into the Hall of Fame: Bill Belichick, Tom Coughlin, George Seifert and Mike Shanahan.

Sort chart by clicking arrows by heading.
In descending order, the tiebreakers are – 1) Better win percentage 2) Earliest Super Bowl

Coaches listed by Games 1st, Wins 2nd, then Super Bowl number
Games	Coach	Wins	Losses	Win percentage	Super Bowls	Team(s)
9	Bill Belichick	6	3	.667	XXXVI, XXXVIII, XXXIX, XLII, XLVI, XLIX, LI, LII, LIII	New England Patriots
6	Andy Reid	3	3	.500	XXXIX	Philadelphia Eagles
6	Andy Reid	3	3	.500	LIV, LV, LVII, LVIII, LIX	Kansas City Chiefs
6	Don Shula	2	4	.333	III	Baltimore Colts
6	Don Shula	2	4	.333	VI, VII, VIII, XVII, XIX	Miami Dolphins
5	Tom Landry	2	3	.400	V, VI, X, XII, XIII	Dallas Cowboys
4	Chuck Noll	4	0	1.000	IX, X, XIII, XIV	Pittsburgh Steelers
4	Joe Gibbs	3	1	.750	XVII, XVIII, XXII, XXVI	Washington Redskins
4	Bud Grant	0	4	.000	IV, VIII, IX, XI	Minnesota Vikings
4	Marv Levy	0	4	.000	XXV, XXVI, XXVII, XXVIII	Buffalo Bills
4	Dan Reeves	0	4	.000	XXI, XXII, XXIV	Denver Broncos
4	Dan Reeves	0	4	.000	XXXIII	Atlanta Falcons
3	Bill Walsh	3	0	1.000	XVI, XIX, XXIII	San Francisco 49ers
3	Bill Parcells	2	1	.667	XXI, XXV	New York Giants
3	Bill Parcells	2	1	.667	XXXI	New England Patriots
3	Mike Holmgren	1	2	.333	XXXI, XXXII	Green Bay Packers
3	Mike Holmgren	1	2	.333	XL	Seattle Seahawks
2	Vince Lombardi	2	0	1.000	I, II	Green Bay Packers
2	Tom Flores	2	0	1.000	XV, XVIII	Oakland/Los Angeles Raiders
2	Jimmy Johnson	2	0	1.000	XXVII, XXVIII	Dallas Cowboys
2	George Seifert	2	0	1.000	XXIV, XXIX	San Francisco 49ers
2	Mike Shanahan	2	0	1.000	XXXII, XXXIII	Denver Broncos
2	Tom Coughlin	2	0	1.000	XLII, XLVI	New York Giants
2	Hank Stram	1	1	.500	I, IV	Kansas City Chiefs
2	Dick Vermeil	1	1	.500	XV	Philadelphia Eagles
2	Dick Vermeil	1	1	.500	XXXIV	St. Louis Rams
2	Bill Cowher	1	1	.500	XXX, XL	Pittsburgh Steelers
2	Mike Tomlin	1	1	.500	XLIII, XLV	Pittsburgh Steelers
2	Pete Carroll	1	1	.500	XLVIII, XLIX	Seattle Seahawks
2	Sean McVay	1	1	.500	LIII, LVI	Los Angeles Rams
2	Nick Sirianni	1	1	.500	LVII, LIX	Philadelphia Eagles
2	John Fox	0	2	.000	XXXVIII	Carolina Panthers
2	John Fox	0	2	.000	XLVIII	Denver Broncos
2	Kyle Shanahan	0	2	.000	LIV, LVIII	San Francisco 49ers

== See also ==
- NFL head coach playoff records
- History of NFL Championships
- List of NFL champions
- List of quarterbacks with multiple Super Bowl starts
- List of Super Bowl appearances
- List of Pro Football Hall of Fame inductees
