= Chuck Noll Field =

Football stadium in Pennsylvania

Coordinates: 40.291028°N 79.403331°W

- Interactive map of Chuck Noll Field
- Location: Latrobe, Pennsylvania
- Owner: Saint Vincent College
- Operator: Saint Vincent College
- Capacity: 1,050
- Surface: Grass

Construction
- Opened: 2003 (playing surface); 2007 (stands constructed)

Tenants
- Saint Vincent Bearcats (NCAA); Pittsburgh Steelers Training camp

Chuck Noll Field is a 1,050-seat football stadium in Latrobe, Pennsylvania. It is home to the Saint Vincent College Bearcats football team. Since 2007, Chuck Noll Field has hosted the Pittsburgh Steelers training camp. It is named after former Steelers head coach, Chuck Noll.

The Steelers regularly attract tens of thousands of fans to training camp and the Rooney family in conjunction with the college administration have vowed to keep with the tradition and always have the camp open and free to the public.

The field is one of the most storied in the NFL and NCAA with Peter King of SI.com describing it as: ". . . I love the place. It's the perfect training-camp setting, looking out over the rolling hills of the Laurel Highlands in west-central Pennsylvania, an hour east of Pittsburgh. On a misty or foggy morning, standing atop the hill at the college, you feel like you're in Scotland. Classic, wonderful slice of Americana. If you can visit one training camp, this is the one to see."

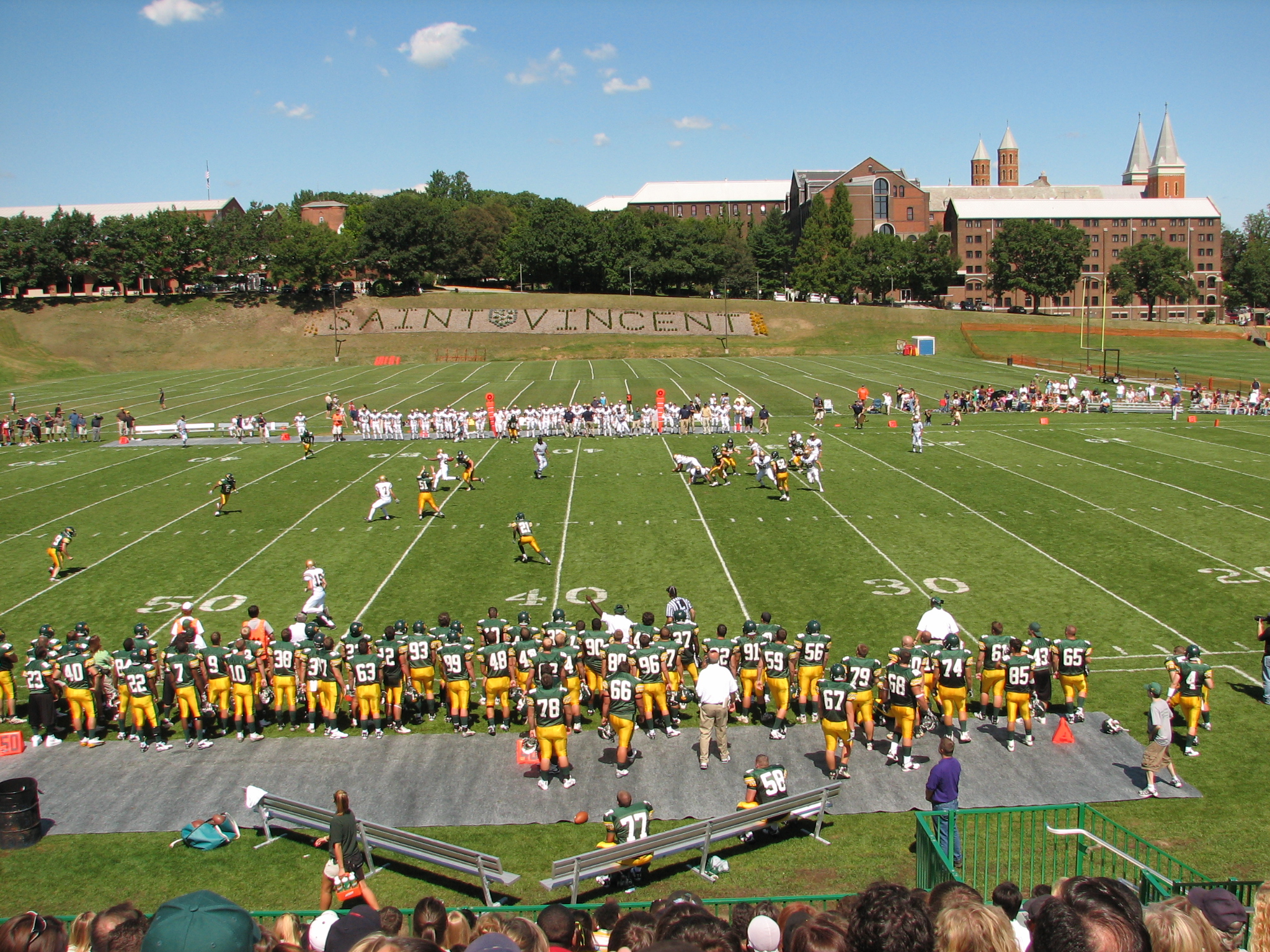
Chuck Noll Field hosting Saint Vincent's 2007 return to football

Events and tenants
Preceded by Elsewhere on Saint Vincent College campus	Host of the Pittsburgh Steelers training camp 2003 – present	Succeeded by present
