= Chuck Noll =

American football player and coach (1932–2014)

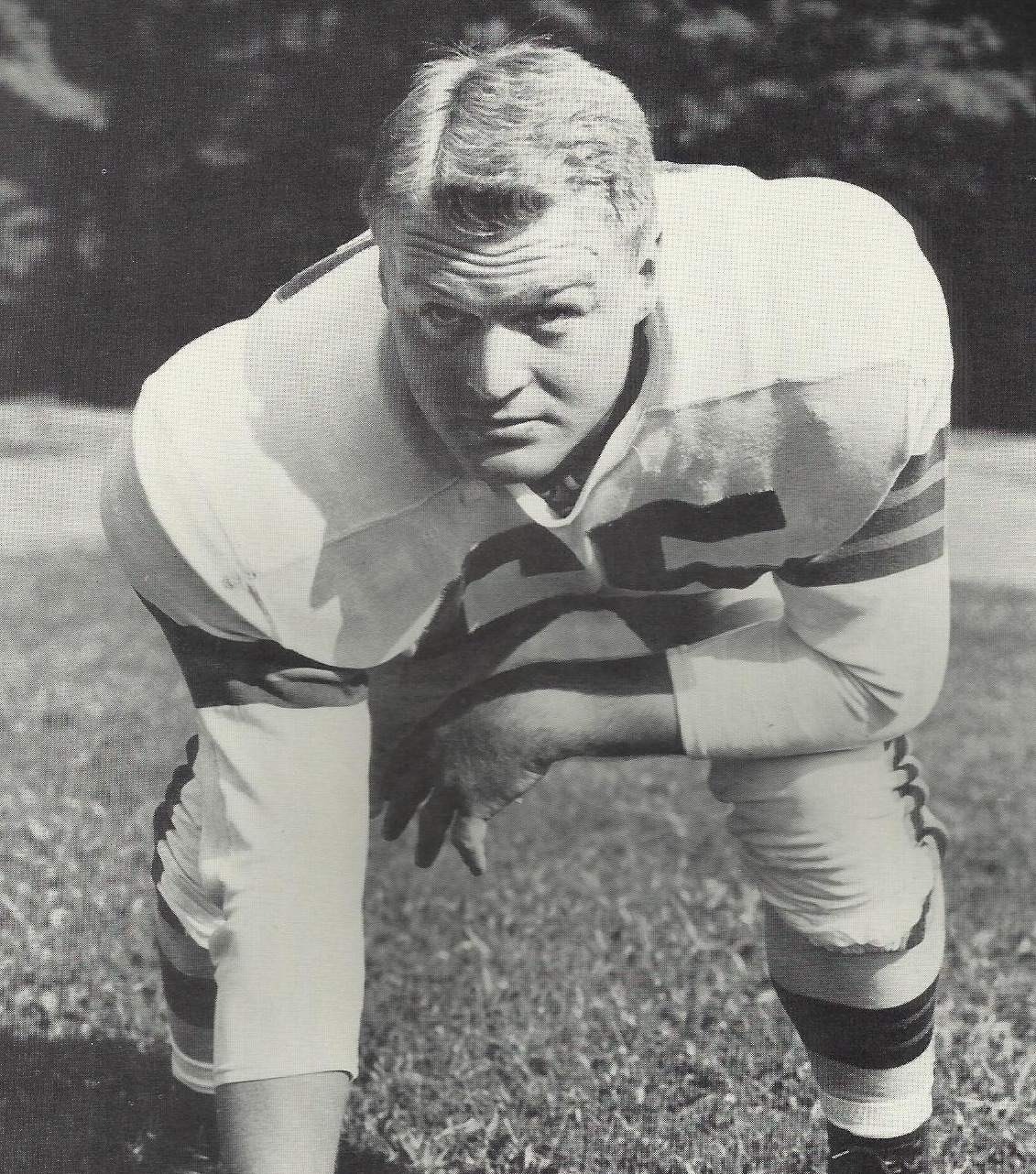
- Noll with the Cleveland Browns in 1954

No. 65
- Positions: Guard, linebacker

Personal information
- Born: January 5, 1932; Cleveland, Ohio, U.S.
- Died: June 13, 2014 (aged 82); Sewickley, Pennsylvania, U.S.
- Listed height: 6 ft 1 in (1.85 m)
- Listed weight: 220 lb (100 kg)

Career information
- High school: Benedictine (Cleveland)
- College: Dayton (1949–1952)
- NFL draft: 1953: 20th round, 239th overall pick

Career history

Playing
- Cleveland Browns (1953–1959)

Coaching
- Los Angeles / San Diego Chargers (1960–1961) Defensive line coach; San Diego Chargers (1962–1965) Defensive coordinator & backfield coach; Baltimore Colts (1966–1968) Defensive coordinator & backfield coach; Pittsburgh Steelers (1969–1991) Head coach

Awards and highlights
- As a player: 2× NFL champion (1954, 1955); As a head coach: 4× Super Bowl champion (IX, X, XIII, XIV); Greasy Neale Award (1989); UPI AFC Coach of the Year (1972); NFL 1970s All-Decade Team; NFL 1980s All-Decade Team; NFL 100th Anniversary All-Time Team; Pittsburgh Steelers Hall of Honor; As an assistant coach: NFL champion (1968); AFL champion (1963)

Career NFL statistics
- Games played: 77
- Games started: 64
- Fumble recoveries: 3
- Interceptions: 8
- Stats at Pro Football Reference

Head coaching record
- Regular season: 193–148–1 (.566)
- Postseason: 16–8 (.667)
- Career: 209–156–1 (.572)
- Coaching profile at Pro Football Reference
- Pro Football Hall of Fame

Charles Henry Noll (January 5, 1932 – June 13, 2014) was an American professional football player and head coach. Regarded as one of the greatest head coaches of all time, his sole head coaching position was for the Pittsburgh Steelers of the National Football League (NFL) from 1969 to 1991. When Noll retired after 23 years, only three other head coaches in NFL history had longer tenures with one team. (Note: George Halas, 30 years with the Chicago Bears, Curly Lambeau, 29 years with the Green Bay Packers, and Tom Landry, 29 years with the Dallas Cowboys.)

After a seven-year playing career that included two NFL Championships as a member of his hometown Cleveland Browns and several years as an assistant coach with various teams, in 1969 Noll took the helm of the Steelers (which had played in only one playoff game in its previous 36 years, a 21–0 loss), and turned it into a perennial contender. As a head coach, Noll won four Super Bowls, four AFC titles and nine Central Division championships, compiled a 209–156–1 (.572) overall record, a 16–8 playoff record and had winning records in 15 of his final 20 seasons. His tenure was defined by a dominant Steelers team, built on the legendary "Steel Curtain" defense and a potent offense. With Terry Bradshaw at quarterback, Franco Harris, Lynn Swann, and John Stallworth led the attack, while defensive greats Joe Greene, Jack Lambert, and Mel Blount anchored one of the most feared units in NFL history. His four Super Bowl victories rank second behind Bill Belichick for the most of any head coach in NFL history, and are the most ever by a head coach without a Super Bowl loss.

Between his playing and coaching tenures, Noll won a total of seven NFL Championships as well as one AFL Championship and was elected to the Pro Football Hall of Fame in 1993, his first year of eligibility.

Noll built the team through astute drafting and meticulous tutoring. During his career, he was notable for the opportunities he gave African Americans, starting the first black quarterback in franchise history and hiring one of the first black assistant coaches in league history. He was often credited with maintaining the morale of Western Pennsylvania, despite the region's steep economic decline in the late 20th century, by creating a team of champions in the image of its blue collar fan base.

== Early life ==
Noll was born in Cleveland, Ohio, the youngest of three siblings (by eight years) of William Noll, a butcher, frequently unable to work owing to Parkinson's disease, and Katherine Steigerwald Noll, a florist. The family lived in the house Noll's mother grew up in with her 12 siblings, near East 74th Street, in a neighborhood with a large African-American population, a fact that helps account for Noll's early championing of opportunity for African Americans in the NFL (both players from traditionally black colleges and later as coaches).

On a local youth football team Noll played with Harold Owens, the nephew of Olympic star Jesse Owens. Noll attended Benedictine High School. He began working in seventh grade and by the time he entered high school, he had saved enough for two-years' worth of the $150 tuition. Throughout high school he continued to work, making 55-cent an hour at Fisher Brothers meat market after school. Education was always important to him, so despite the schedule, he studied enough to graduate 28th in his class of 252.

== Playing career ==
Noll played running back and tackle on the high school football team, winning All-State honors. During his senior year, he was named to the "All Catholic Universe" team by the Diocese of Cleveland newspaper. Noll was also a wrestler while in high school.

Noll planned to attend Notre Dame, but during a practice before his freshman year he suffered an epileptic seizure on the field. Notre Dame coach Frank Leahy refused to take the risk of allowing Noll to play there and so Noll accepted a football scholarship to the University of Dayton. Noll graduated with a degree in secondary education. As a member of the Flyers, he was a lineman, linebacker and a co-captain, and acquired the nickname, the "Pope," for his "'infallible' grasp of the game."

=== Cleveland Browns ===
Noll was selected by the Cleveland Browns in the 20th round of the 1953 NFL draft (239th overall). During his first year, the Browns lost to the Detroit Lions in the NFL championship. The next two years, however, the Browns were NFL champions, and Noll finished his NFL career with eight interceptions, three fumble recoveries, and a touchdown on one of each.

Although the undersized Noll was drafted as a linebacker, Coach Paul Brown used him as one of his "messenger guards" to send play calls to the quarterback, beginning with Otto Graham. Brown recalled that Noll soon "could have called the plays himself without any help from the bench. That's how smart he was." According to Art Rooney, Jr., director of scouting for the Steelers before and during most of Noll's tenure, Noll felt demeaned by Brown's use of him in that way and "disliked the term 'messenger boy' so much that as coach of the Steelers he entrusted all the play calling to his quarterbacks."

Noll was paid only $5,000 per season with the Browns and so while there he acted as substitute teacher at Holy Name High School and sold insurance on the side. During that period Noll also attended Cleveland-Marshall College of Law at night. He told Dan Rooney that he decided against becoming a lawyer because "he didn't really like the constant confrontation and arguments that come with being a lawyer."

When Noll lost the starting guard position to John Wooten, he chose to retire at age 27 expecting to begin his coaching career at his alma mater. He was surprised, however, when he was not offered an open position on the University of Dayton coaching staff. He was offered a position by Sid Gillman on the staff of the Los Angeles Chargers, during its inaugural season.

== Coaching career ==
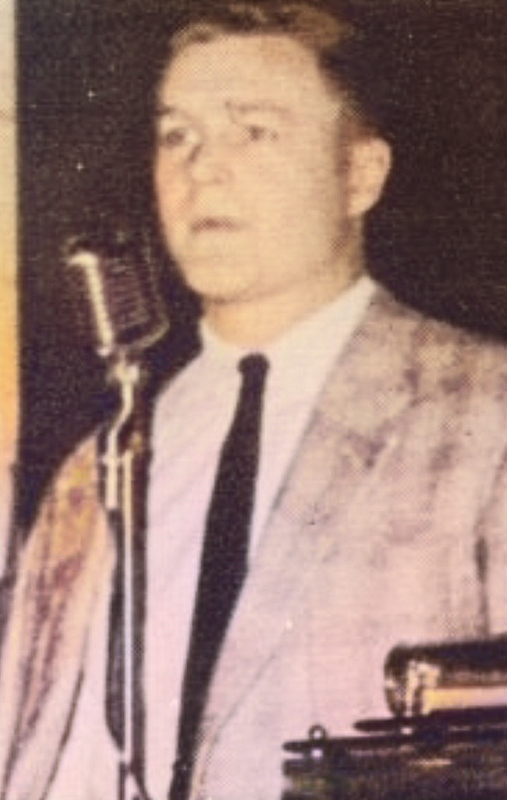
Noll giving a presentation at his alma mater, Benedictine High School, in 1958

Noll was an assistant coach for the American Football League's then Los Angeles and later San Diego Chargers from 1960 to 1965. He then became assistant to head coach Don Shula of the NFL Baltimore Colts from 1965 to 1968, when he was selected as the Pittsburgh Steelers' head coach.

=== Los Angeles/San Diego Chargers ===
Noll is considered part of Sid Gillman's coaching tree. He later remembered Gillman as "one of the game's prime researchers and offensive specialists. In six years, I had more exposure to football than I normally would have received in 12 years." During Noll's six-year tenure with the Chargers, where he was defensive line coach, the defensive backfield coach and defensive coordinator, the team appeared in five AFL championship games. Gillman said that Noll "had a great way with players," specifically "If a guy didn't do the job expected, Chuck could climb on his back." Massive defensive tackle Ernie Ladd said that Noll was a "fiery guy" but also "the best teacher I ever played under." "He and I were always fighting, always squabbling, but he had a great way of teaching. I take my hat off to Chuck. He was one of the main reasons for our success." The defensive line under Noll became known as the "Fearsome Foursome," and during 1961 defensive end Earl Faison was named AFL rookie of the year.

During Noll's time at Chargers, Al Davis was also an assistant and scout. Davis would later become coach and general manager of the Oakland Raiders, the principal AFC rival of the Steelers' in the 1970s.

=== Baltimore Colts ===
With the Colts, Noll was defensive backfield coach and later defensive coordinator. Together with assistant coach Bill Arnsparger the Colts employed shifting alignments of rotating zone and maximum blitz defensive packages. In 1968, Noll's last season as defensive coordinator, the Baltimore Colts compiled a 13–1 record in the regular season and tied the NFL season record for fewest points allowed (144).

Shula was impressed by Noll's approach: "He explained how to do things and wrote up the technique. He was one of the first coaches I was around that wrote up in great detail all of the techniques used by players—for example, the backpedal and the defensive back's position on the receiver. He was like a classroom teacher."

The Colts won the NFL championship by routing the Cleveland Browns 34–0 in Cleveland, but were shocked by the upstart AFL champion New York Jets, 16–7, in Super Bowl III at the Orange Bowl in Miami. The next day, Noll interviewed for the head coach position in Pittsburgh.

=== Pittsburgh Steelers ===
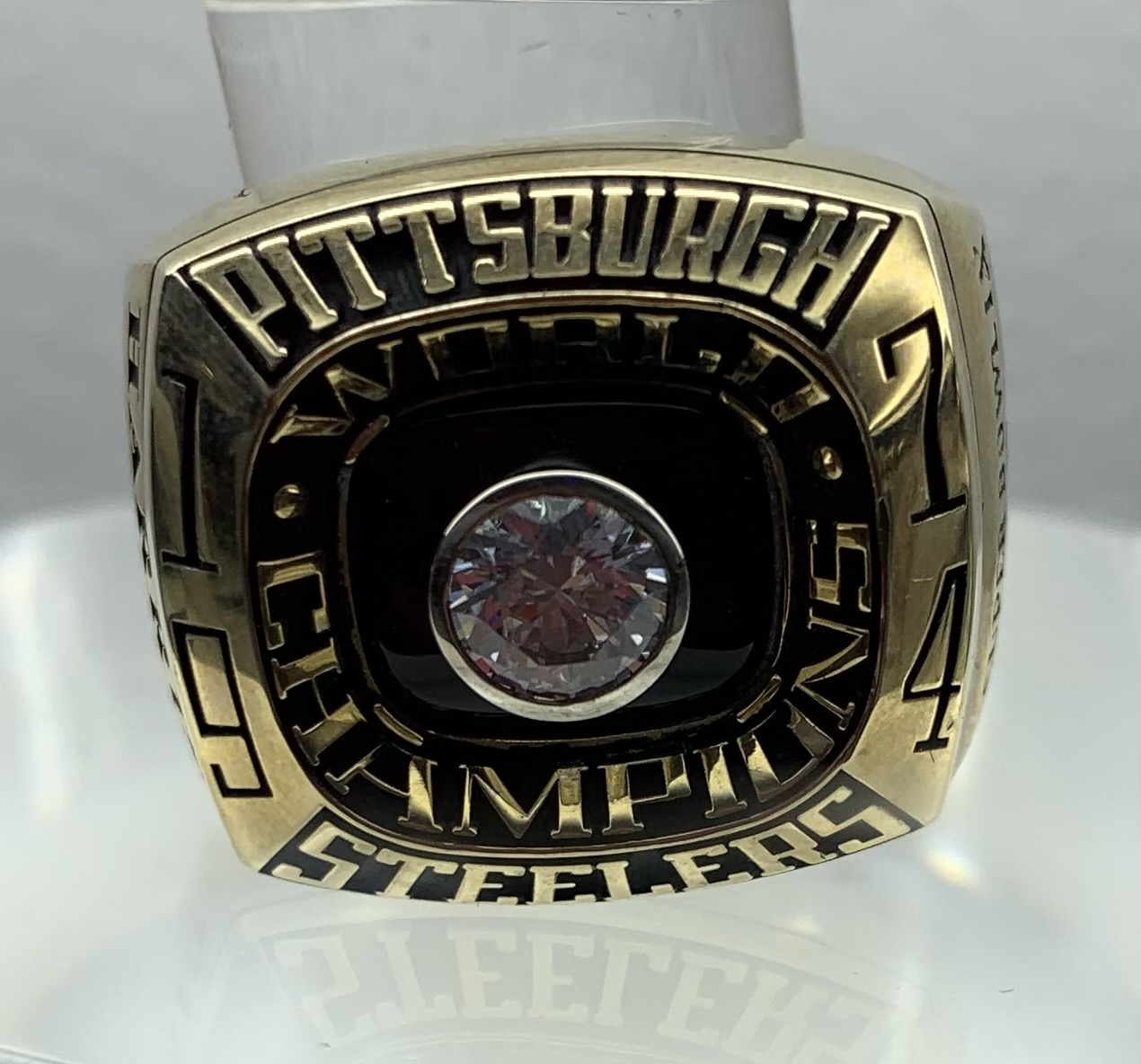
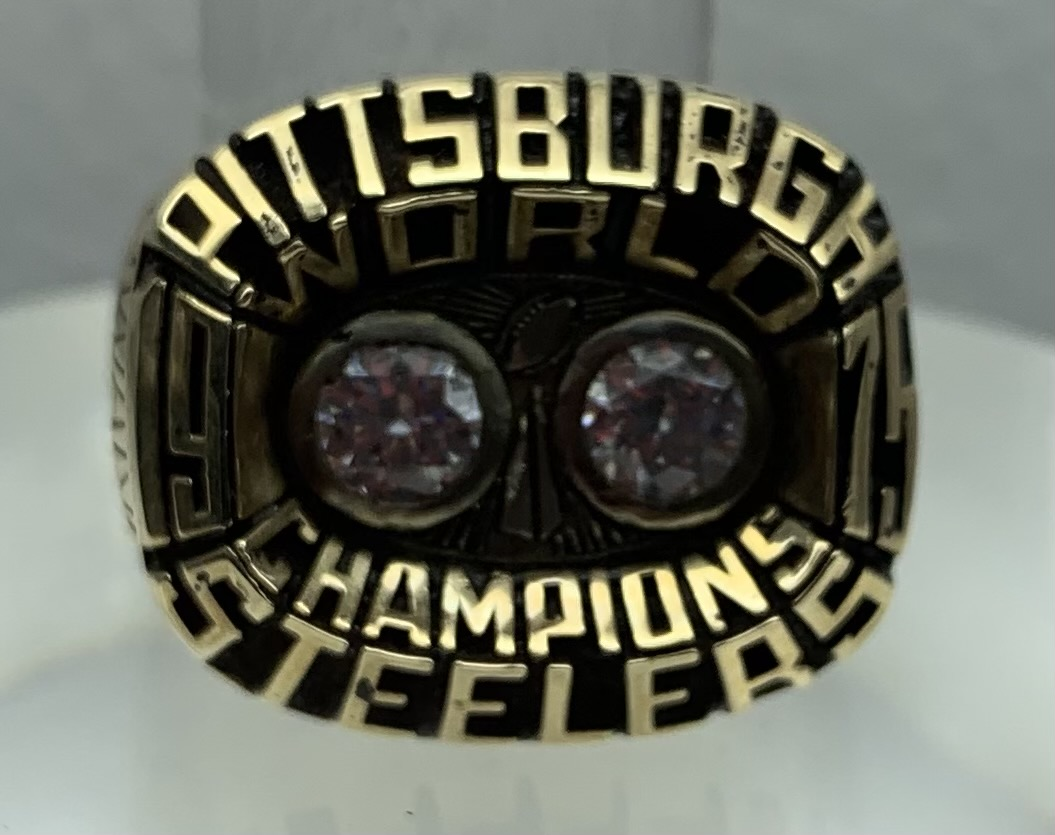
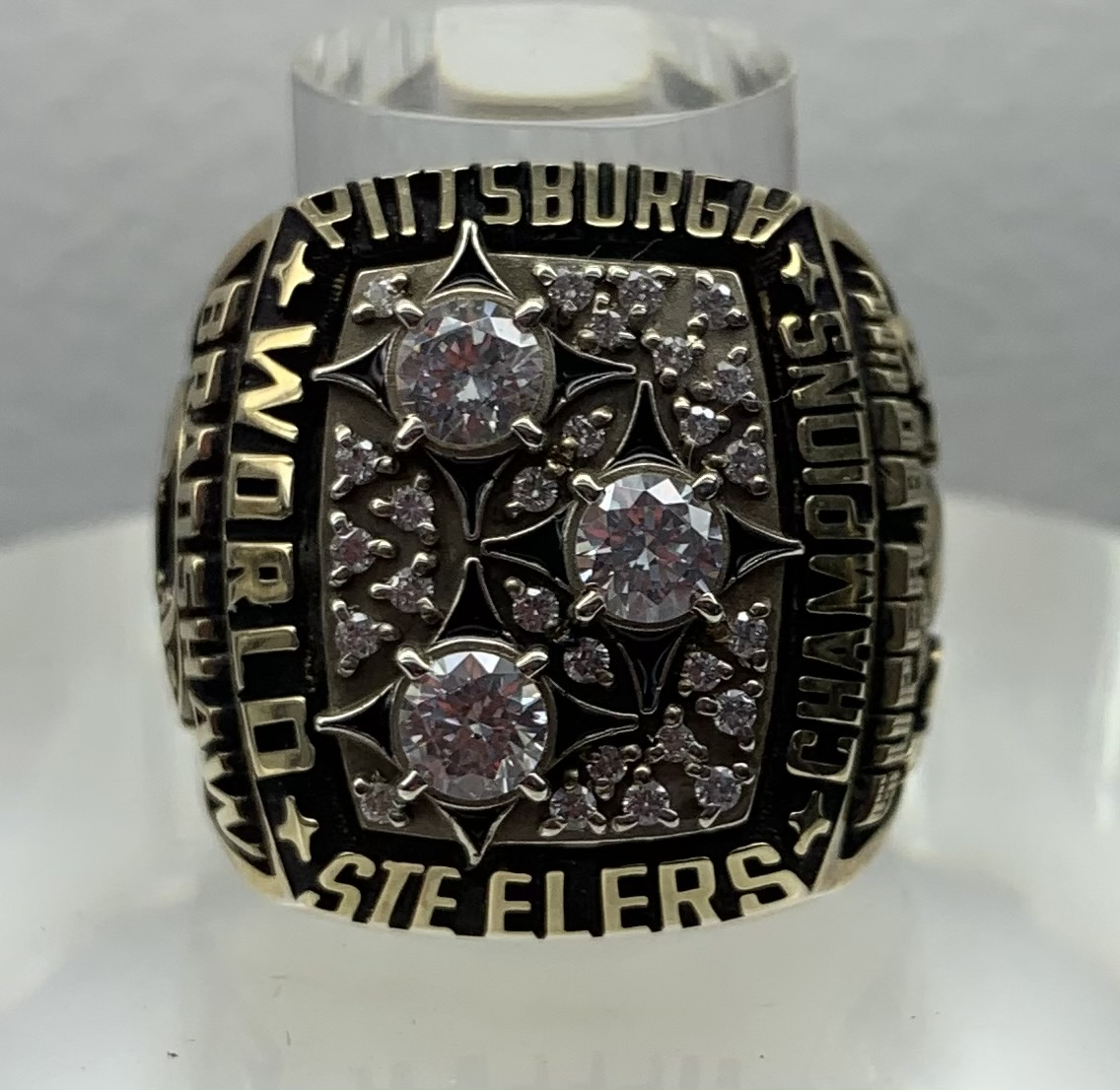
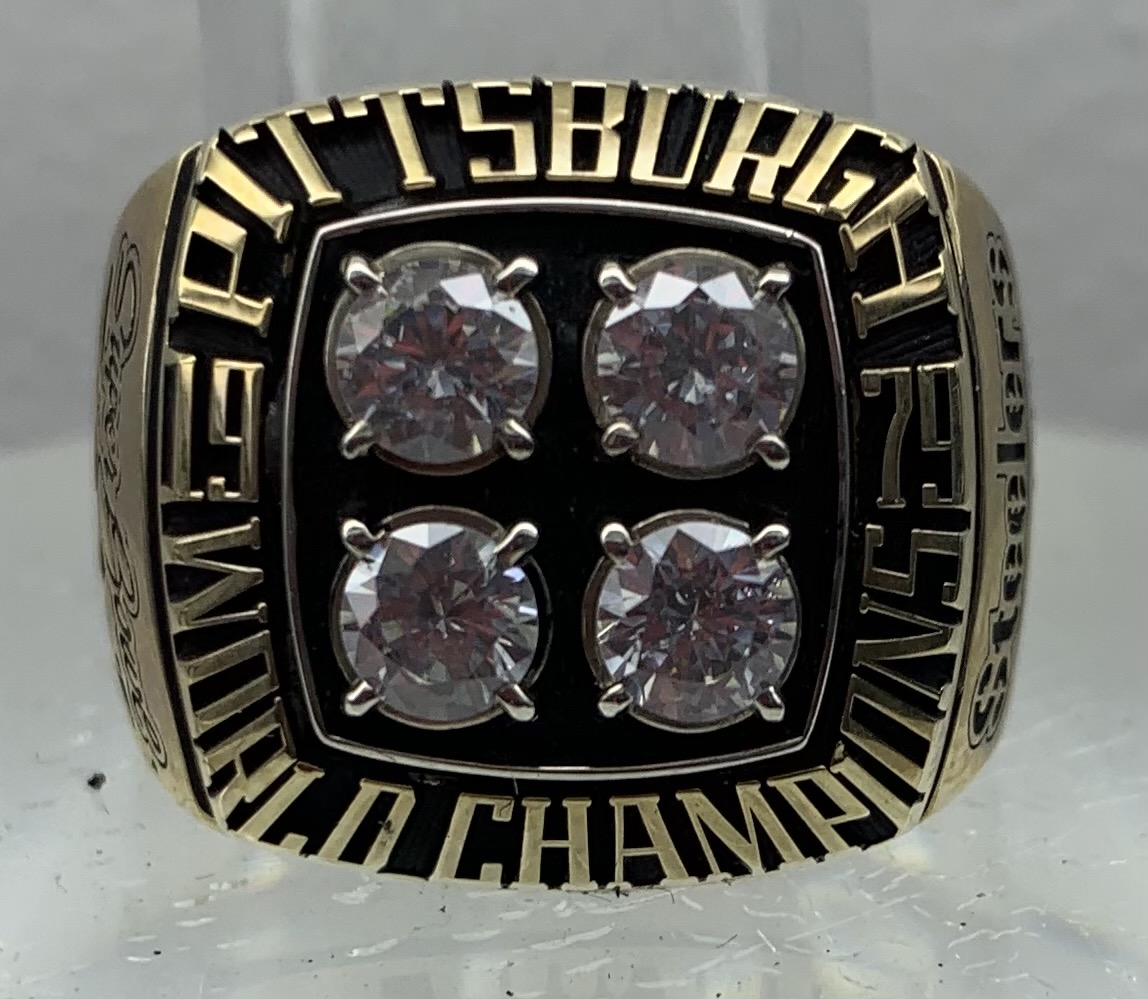
As the head coach of the Steelers, Noll helped lead the team to four Super Bowl victories, IX, X, XIII and XIV

At age 37, Noll was named the 14th head coach of the Pittsburgh Steelers on January 27, 1969, after Penn State coach Joe Paterno turned down an offer for the position. At the time of his hiring, he was the youngest head coach in the NFL. Steelers owner Art Rooney would later credit Don Shula as the person who recommended Noll as a head coach.

Noll inherited a struggling team that had yet to record a postseason victory and regularly trotted out short-term coaches with Noll being the 16th coaching change in the 36 years of the franchise's existence. In his first season as head coach, Noll led the Steelers to their worst season to date in franchise history, finishing with a 1–13 record. This record allowed for the Steelers to hold the first overall pick in the 1970 NFL draft which the team used to select Louisiana Tech quarterback Terry Bradshaw.

Prior to the 1970 season, Noll cut much of the team's roster. Laying the foundation for the coaching style he later became known for, Noll told the team, "The reason you've been losing is you're not any good. You're not fast enough, you're not strong enough, you're not quick enough, you're not smart enough. I'm going to have to get rid of most of you." In total, only 14 players from the 1969 roster returned in 1970. With a rebuilding team, Noll helped the Steelers improve to a record of 5–9, moving them to third place in the AFC Central. Noll became known during practice to dwell on fundamentals—such as the three-point stance, things that professional players were expected to know. Andy Russell, already a Pro Bowl linebacker before Noll arrived and one of the few players Noll kept after purging the roster, was told by Noll that he didn't have his feet positioned correctly.

Throughout 1971, Noll implemented a defensive system that became known as the "Steel Curtain" defense. His defensive philosophy relied on controlling the line of scrimmage, stopping the run, and pressuring the quarterback, notably often done through blitzing with players such as linebackers Jack Lambert and Jack Ham. His coaching style earned him the nickname of The Emperor Chaz by sports announcer Myron Cope. It was with this defensive strategy that the Steelers allowed just 175 points during the regular season, the second-fewest in the NFL and finished with a record of 11–3. The team went on to record their first post season victory against the Oakland Raiders 13–7, which included one of the most famous plays in NFL history, The Immaculate Reception. The Steelers went on to lose the AFC championship to the eventual Super Bowl champion Miami Dolphins 21–17.

Continuing to build on the team's success in 1973, the Steelers won 10 of their 14 games and clinched a second consecutive playoff berth for the first time in franchise history. However, the team fell 33–14 against the Oakland Raiders in a rematch of the previous season's divisional round.

It was in 1974 that the tide turned for Noll and the team. After a regular season record of 10–3–1 clinched a playoff berth for the third year, Noll led the team on an upset playoff run. The Steelers defeated the Buffalo Bills and Oakland Raiders in the playoffs, scoring 56 total points and only allowing a combined 27. The season culminated in a Super Bowl IX victory over the Minnesota Vikings, giving the Steelers their first ever championship appearance and win.

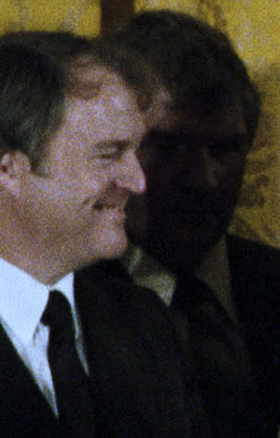
Noll at the White House following the Steelers' Super Bowl XIV victory in 1980

He led the team to continued dominance, winning Super Bowl X the following year over the Dallas Cowboys, making the Steelers the third team to ever repeat Super Bowl titles. He went on to become the first head coach to win four Super Bowls (IX, X, XIII, XIV). The teams that won Super Bowls IX and X used a run-oriented offense, primarily featuring Franco Harris and blocking back Rocky Bleier. Over the next few years, Terry Bradshaw matured into an outstanding passer, and the teams that won Super Bowls XIII and XIV fully utilized the receiving tandem of Lynn Swann and John Stallworth.

While most of his contemporaries enforced strict curfew rules on its players, Noll was very lax on off-the-field behavior. This was shown at Super Bowl IX. While Noll's counterpart – Minnesota Vikings head coach Bud Grant – strictly kept his team in their hotel rooms except for practice before the game, Noll told his team upon arriving in New Orleans to go out on Bourbon Street "and get the partying out of your system now."

Noll was notoriously shy and did not like the media or give many interviews. His 1970s teams were so talented that his contributions as head coach (and architect of the team) often were overlooked. In 23 seasons as coach in Pittsburgh, Noll did exactly one endorsement deal, doing so as a favor to a friend for Pittsburgh National Bank that saw his face plastered on billboards. When asked about why he was at a hospital visiting a friend on the morning of a Steelers game, he stated "You coach during the week. There's nothing I could do on a Sunday morning that's going to make my team win. My team learns to win Thursday through Saturday."

In 1983's draft, Noll elected to pass on University of Pittsburgh quarterback and Pittsburgh native Dan Marino, instead selecting nose tackle Gabriel Rivera. Marino went on to become a Hall of Fame quarterback who broke numerous passing records with the Miami Dolphins and won honors such as league MVP and the Walter Payton NFL Man of the Year Award while being named to the Pro Bowl nine times. Rivera only played six professional games due to being paralyzed after an accident in which he was drunk driving. Noll later said that his decision was a reaction to a rumor that Marino had taken cocaine during his time at Pitt. Noll also believed the team would be able to retain then 34-year-old Bradshaw and that Cliff Stoudt would be able to replace him.

In Noll’s twilight years as a head coach, his team’s performances waned. After Bradshaw unexpectedly retired at the conclusion of the 1983 season, Noll chose 1980's first round pick Mark Malone to be his successor. The Steelers finished 1984 going 9–7 and achieving first place in the AFC Central. Noll led the team on a playoff run that concluded with an AFC Championship loss to the Miami Dolphins who, ironically, had Marino as their starting quarterback. Over Noll’s next four seasons, he led the team to a record of 26–37. In 1988, Noll led the team to the worst record they had experienced since 1969 when they won just five out of their 16 regular season games, making them fall to fourth place in the AFC Central. As of the 2024 season, this remains the last time the Steelers placed last in their division. Noll was heavily criticized during the season. His former quarterback, Terry Bradshaw, commented that "the game has passed him by".

He rebounded in 1989, leading the team to an improved 9–7 record with quarterback Bubby Brister at the helm. Noll was recognized as NFL Coach of the Year, when he guided the Steelers into the second round of the playoffs, which they lost to the Denver Broncos with a final score of 24–23. The team was not especially talented and lost its first two regular-season games by scores of 51–0 and 41–10. However, Noll kept the team focused and its play steadily improved enough to make the playoffs and play competitively in two playoff games; Noll went a combined 16–16 in his last two seasons at the helm of the Steelers. On December 26, 1991, Noll announced his retirement.

=== Post-coaching life ===
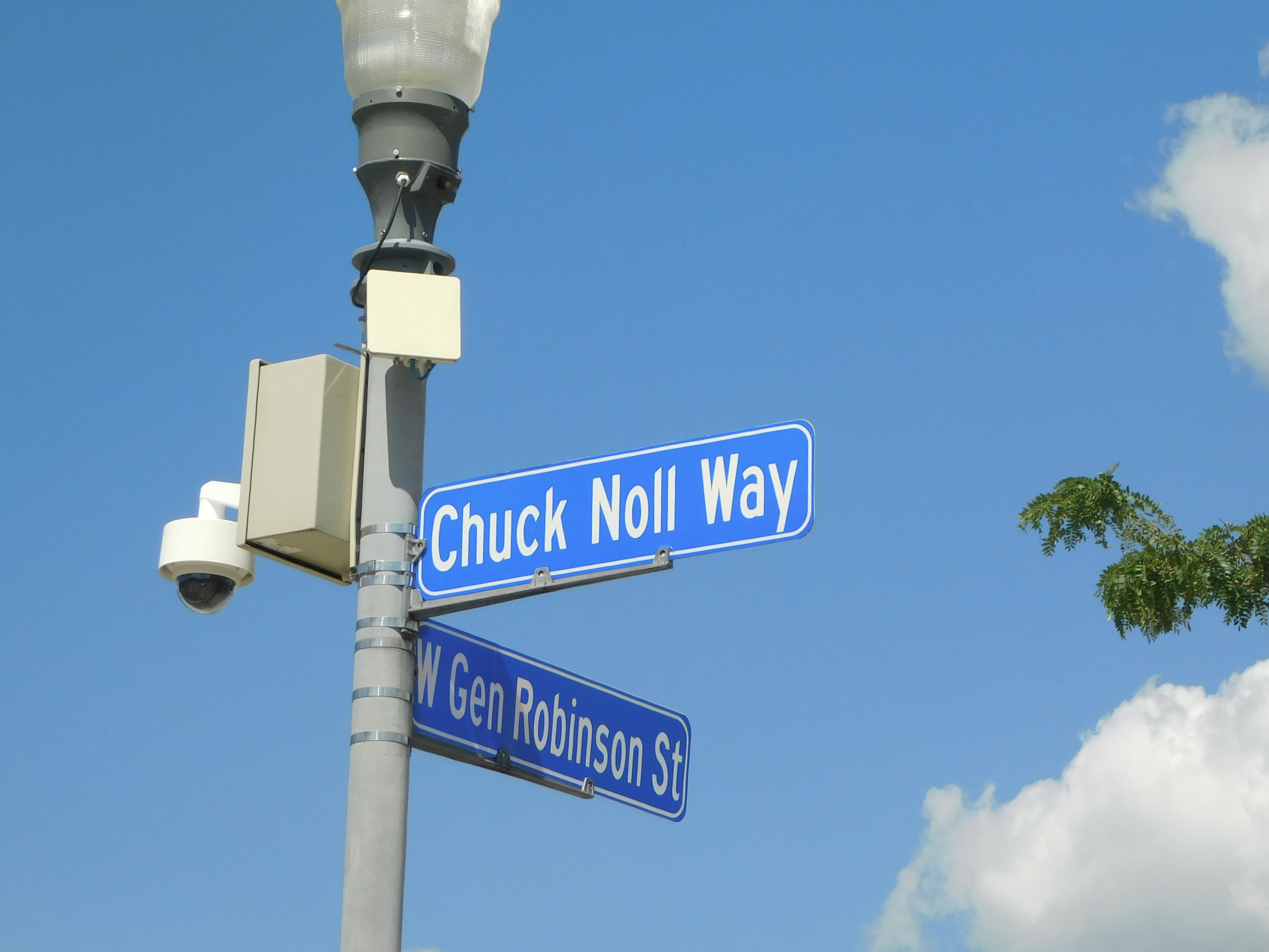
Street sign for Chuck Noll Way as it appeared in July 2022.

Noll retired as Steelers head coach after the 1991 season with a career record of 209–156–1, including regular season and postseason games. He was elected to the Pro Football Hall of Fame two years later, in 1993.

Noll maintained a residence in Sewickley, a suburb of Pittsburgh, and also spent time at his Florida home. The Pittsburgh Steelers gave him a gift of a stationary bicycle, which he avidly used. Noll's mobility was limited by chronic back problems. His soft-spoken nature remained consistent, granting occasional, yet infrequent, interviews between his retirement and his death.

Noll held the ceremonial title of administration adviser in the Pittsburgh Steelers' front office but had no real role in the team's operations after his retirement.

He spent about half the year in Pittsburgh with his wife Marianne. Their son, Chris, is a teacher in a private high school in Connecticut.

== Death ==
Noll died of natural causes in Sewickley, Pennsylvania on June 13, 2014, after suffering for several years from Alzheimer's disease, and a heart condition. Noll's funeral was held on June 17, 2014, at St. Paul's Cathedral in Pittsburgh.

== Legacy ==
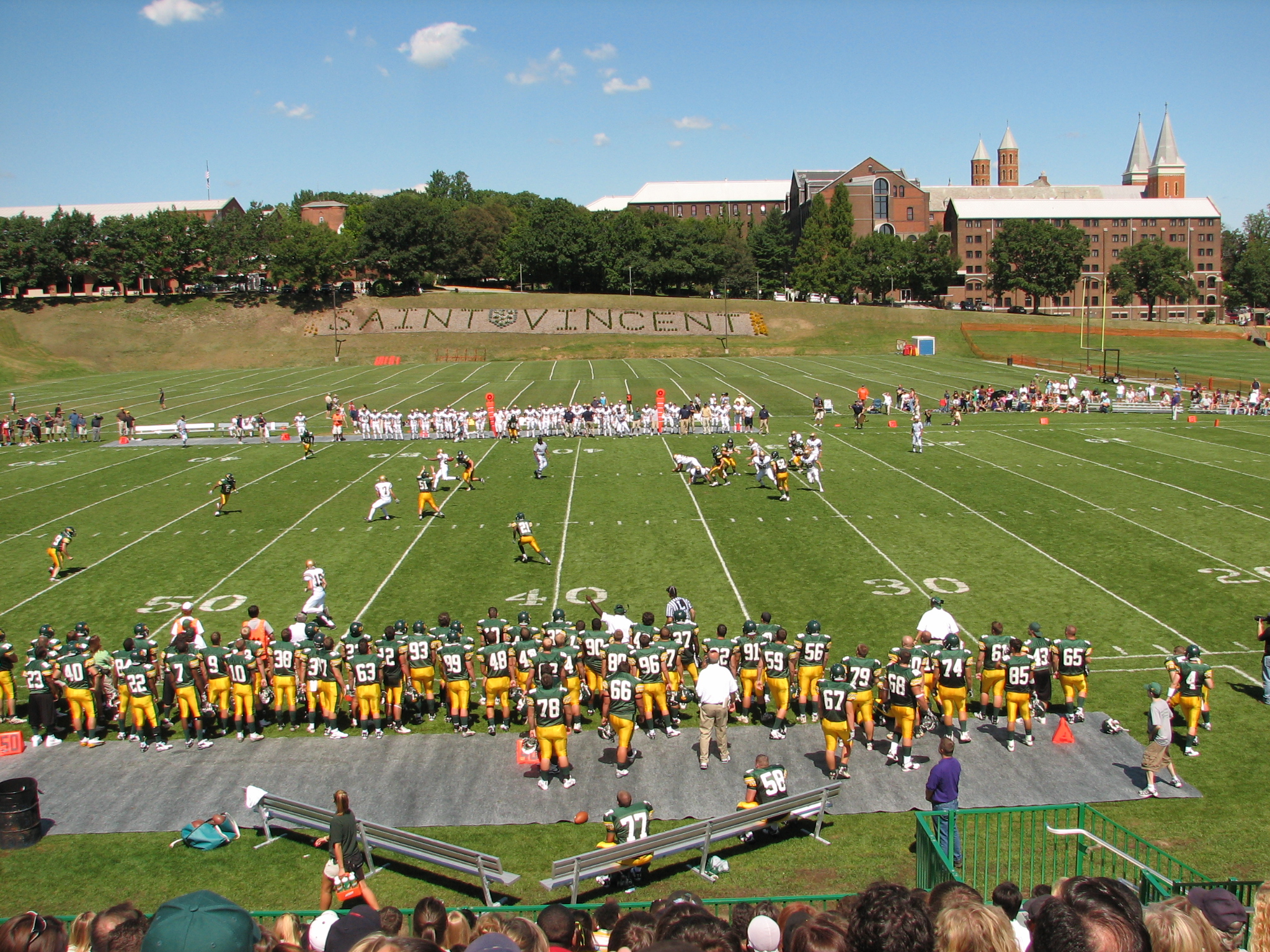
Chuck Noll Field at Saint Vincent College. Here, Saint Vincent returns to college football in a game against Gallaudet University.

Noll's legacy includes providing opportunities for African Americans. Under Noll, Joe Gilliam became the league's first African American starting quarterback just a few seasons after the AFL started Marlin Briscoe, and James Harris (Gilliam started ahead of Terry Bradshaw briefly during the 1974 season). In January 1975, Franco Harris became the first African American to win the Super Bowl MVP award.

During the 1980s, Tony Dungy, who played for two seasons under Noll in the late 1970s, got his start as an NFL assistant coach, initially as the Steelers' defensive backs coach, and later he became the first African-American coordinator (defensive) in the NFL. Noll strongly promoted Dungy as a well-qualified head coaching candidate, but it did not happen for Dungy with the Steelers when Noll retired after the 1991 season. However, Dungy did become head coach of the Tampa Bay Buccaneers and later became the first African American coach to win a Super Bowl (XLI) with the Indianapolis Colts.

On August 2, 2007, the field at St. Vincent Seminary in Latrobe, Pennsylvania, was dedicated and renamed Chuck Noll Field in honor of the former coach. The Steelers have held their summer camp at St. Vincent College, as it was Noll's idea to take the team away from the distractions in the city to prepare for the season each year, since 1975. The team celebrated 50 years of utilizing the field in July 2015.

Noll was honored on October 7, 2007, at Heinz Field during the Pittsburgh Steelers' pre-game ceremonies before the Steelers blew out the Seahawks 21–0.

On September 30, 2011, Pittsburgh honored Noll by naming a new street after him. Chuck Noll Way connects North Shore Drive to West General Robinson St. The street runs along Stage AE, on the North Shore of Pittsburgh.

Noll has been the subject of multiple publications due to his on-field success. His biography, written by sports author Michael MacCambridge, Chuck Noll: His Life's Work was published on October 28, 2016. Men of Steel by Jim Wexwell was published in 2006, which heavily focuses on the Steelers' early success through the 1970s and 1980s, highlighting Noll's tenure with the team.

== Head coaching record ==
Team	Year	Regular season					Postseason			
Team	Year	Won	Lost	Ties	Win %	Finish	Won	Lost	Win %	Result
PIT	1969	1	13	0	.071	4th in NFL Central	—	—	—	—
PIT	1970	5	9	0	.357	3rd in AFC Central	—	—	—	—
PIT	1971	6	8	0	.429	2nd in AFC Central	—	—	—	—
PIT	1972	11	3	0	.786	1st in AFC Central	1	1	.500	Lost to the Miami Dolphins in AFC Championship Game
PIT	1973	10	4	0	.714	2nd in AFC Central	0	1	.000	Lost to the Oakland Raiders in AFC Divisional Round
PIT	1974	10	3	1	.750	1st in AFC Central	3	0	1.000	Super Bowl IX champions
PIT	1975	12	2	0	.857	1st in AFC Central	3	0	1.000	Super Bowl X champions
PIT	1976	10	4	0	.714	1st in AFC Central	1	1	.500	Lost to the Oakland Raiders in AFC Championship Game
PIT	1977	9	5	0	.643	1st in AFC Central	0	1	.000	Lost to the Denver Broncos in AFC Divisional Round
PIT	1978	14	2	0	.875	1st in AFC Central	3	0	1.000	Super Bowl XIII champions
PIT	1979	12	4	0	.750	1st in AFC Central	3	0	1.000	Super Bowl XIV champions
PIT	1980	9	7	0	.563	3rd in AFC Central	—	—	—	—
PIT	1981	8	8	0	.500	2nd in AFC Central	—	—	—	—
PIT	1982	6	3	0	.667	4th in AFC*	0	1	.000	Lost to the San Diego Chargers in AFC Wild Card Round
PIT	1983	10	6	0	.625	1st in AFC Central	0	1	.000	Lost to the Los Angeles Raiders in AFC Divisional Round
PIT	1984	9	7	0	.563	1st in AFC Central	1	1	.500	Lost to the Miami Dolphins in AFC Championship Game
PIT	1985	7	9	0	.438	2nd in AFC Central	—	—	—	—
PIT	1986	6	10	0	.375	3rd in AFC Central	—	—	—	—
PIT	1987	8	7	0	.533	3rd in AFC Central	—	—	—	—
PIT	1988	5	11	0	.313	4th in AFC Central	—	—	—	—
PIT	1989	9	7	0	.563	2nd in AFC Central	1	1	.500	Lost to the Denver Broncos in AFC Divisional Round
PIT	1990	9	7	0	.563	3rd in AFC Central	—	—	—	—
PIT	1991	7	9	0	.438	2nd in AFC Central	—	—	—	—
Total		193	148	1	.566		16	8	.667	

- *- Due to the 1982 NFL season being shortened to nine games due to a players' strike, the top eight teams in each conference, regardless of division, qualified for the playoffs.

== Coaching tree ==
Assistants under Chuck Noll who became college or professional head coaches:

- Rollie Dotsch: Birmingham Stallions (1983–1985)
- George Perles: Michigan State Spartans (1983–1994)
- Lionel Taylor: Texas Southern University (1984–1988), London Monarchs (1998)
- Woody Widenhofer: Oklahoma Outlaws (1984), Missouri Tigers (1985–1988), Vanderbilt Commodores (1997–2001)
- Bud Carson: Cleveland Browns (1989–1990)
- Rod Rust: New England Patriots (1990), Montreal Alouettes (2001)
- Joe Walton: New York Jets (1983–1989), Robert Morris College (1994–2013)
- Tony Dungy: Tampa Bay Buccaneers (1996–2001), Indianapolis Colts (2002–2008)
- Hal Hunter: Louisiana State University (1999)
- John Fox: Carolina Panthers (2002–2010), Denver Broncos (2011–2014), Chicago Bears (2015–2017)

== See also ==
- List of American Football League players
- List of National Football League head coaches with 50 wins
- List of National Football League head coaches with 200 wins
- List of Super Bowl head coaches
