= Hartmut Seifert =

German economist (born 1944)

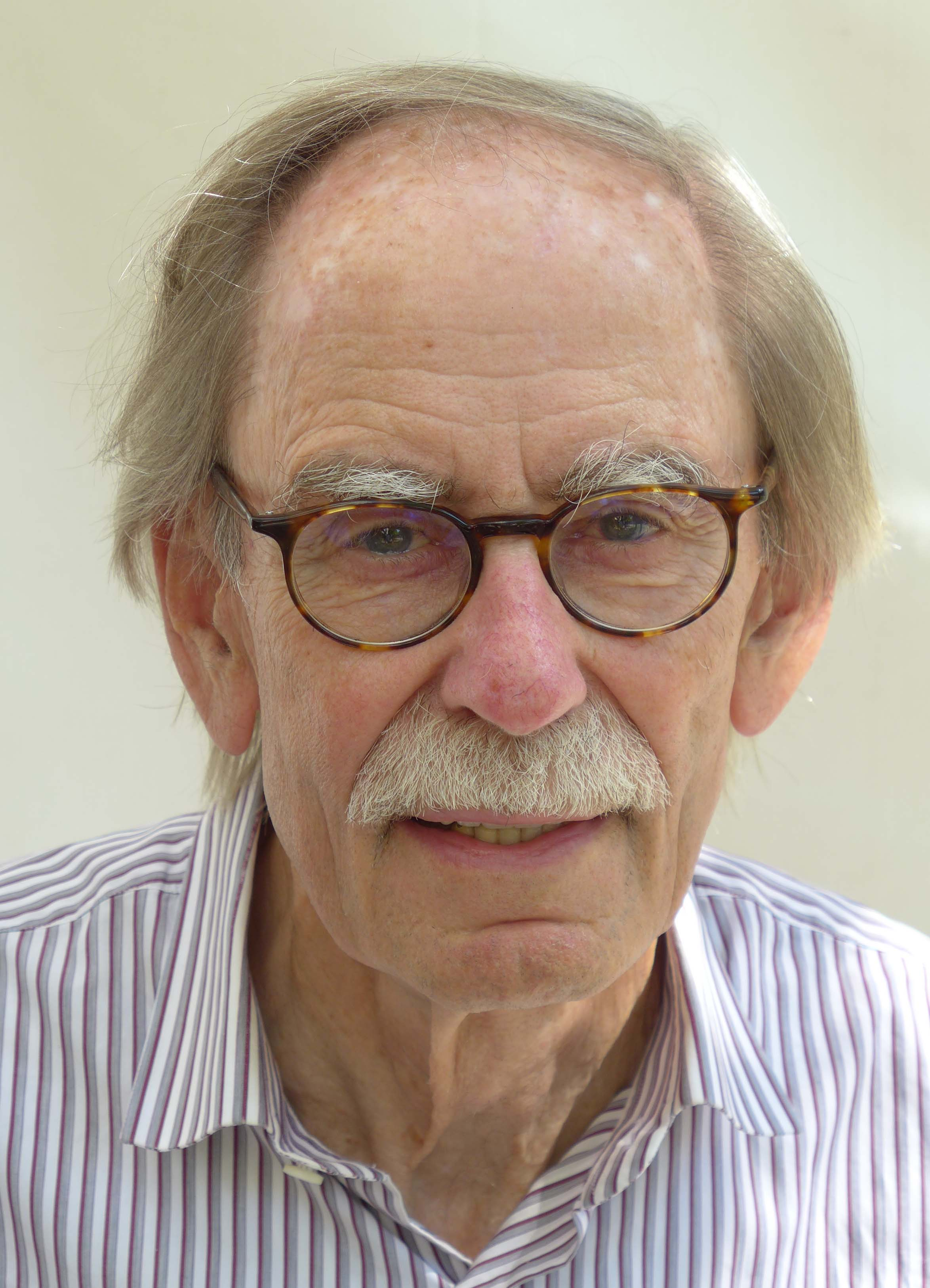
- Hartmut Seifert, Düsseldorf, 2022
- Born: 23 January 1944 (age 82); Tilsit (East Prussia)
- Citizenship: Germany
- Education: Free University of Berlin
- Known for: Contributions to labour economics Leader of the Institute of Economic and Social Research of the Hans Böckler Foundation; Scientific correspondent for the Japan Institute for Labour Policy and Training (JILPT), Tokyo
- Scientific career
- Fields: Labour economics
- Workplaces: Free University of Berlin; Federal Institute for Vocational Training Research in Berlin; Institute of Economic and Social Research of the Hans Böckler Foundation in Düsseldorf

Hartmut Seifert (born 23 January 1944 in Tilsit (East Prussia) is an influential German labor market and working time researcher, former leader of the Institute of Economic and Social Research of the Hans Böckler Foundation and scientific correspondent for the Japan Institute for Labour Policy and Training (JILPT), Tokyo.

== Life ==
Hartmut Seifert studied economics at the University of Würzburg and the Free University of Berlin and graduated in 1971 with a degree in economics. In 1983 he received his PhD. rer. pol. from the University of Paderborn. Hartmut Seifert started his scientific career as a research assistant at the Free University of Berlin (1972-1974), then moved to the Federal Institute for Vocational Training Research in Berlin (1974–1975), from 1975 to 1994 he has worked as a research officer at the Economics and Social Science Institute (WSI) of the DGB. From 1995 to early 2009, he headed the Economic and Social Sciences Institute (WSI) of the Hans Böckler Foundation in Düsseldorf. Since 1990, Seifert has been a corresponding researcher at the Japan Institute for Labor Policy and Training (JILPT), Tokyo. He has had study visits to the United States (Economic Policy Institute, Washington, DC) and Japan (JILPT), and since 2009 he has been a retired independent researcher and policy advisor. From 2012 to 2018 he was a senior research fellow at the WSI of the Hans Böckler Foundation.

== Research ==
Seifert's research activities cover a wide range of working time and labor market issues. They relate to the organization of working hours, their flexibilization and working time autonomy. He also examines the institutional structure of the labor market, investigates questions of deregulation and flexibilization of forms of employment and their social effects. This also includes work on the relationship between flexibility and social security, on Flexicurity.

== Publications (selected) ==
- Hartmut Seifert (1984), Arbeitsmarktpolitik in Deutschland (Public Labour Market Policies in Germany) (in German), Köln: Bund-Verlag, ISBN 3766308572
- Hartmut Seifert, Gerhard Bosch, Bernd-Georg Spies (1984), Arbeitsmarktpolitik und gewerkschaftliche Interessenvertretung (Labour Market Policy and Union Advocacy) (in German), Köln: Bund-Verlag, ISBN 3766305999
- Hartmut Seifert, Gerhard Bosch, Norbert Engelhardt, Klaus Hermann, Ingrid Kurz-Scherf (1988), Arbeitszeitverkürzung im Betrieb (Working Time Reduction in Companies) (in German), Köln: Bund-Verlag, ISBN 3766331051
- Hartmut Seifert, Peter Joachim (1991), Neue Technik und Arbeitszeitgestaltung (New Technologies and Working Time Arrangements) (in German), Opladen: Westdeutscher Verlag, doi:10.1007/978-3-322-94151-0, ISBN 978-3-322-94151-0
- Hartmut Seifert, Klaus Besselmann, Gerd Machalowski, Christiane Ochs (1994), Kurzarbeit und Qualifizierung (Short-Time Work and Qualification Activities) (in German), Bonn: Bundesministeriums für Arbeit und Sozialordnung. Forschungsbericht Nr. 235
- Hartmut Seifert, Markus Promberger, Jörg Rosdücher, Rainer Trinczek (1996), Beschäftigungssicherung durch Arbeitszeitverkürzung (Working Time Reductions as a Measure to Safeguarding Jobs) (in German), Berlin: sigma-verlag, ISBN 3-89404-430-6
- Hartmut Seifert, Markus Promberger, Jörg Rosdücher, Rainer Trinczek (1997), Weniger Geld, kürzere Arbeitszeit, sichere Jobs? (Less Money, Shorter Working Time and Safer Jobs?) (in German), Berlin: sigma-verlag
- Hartmut Seifert, Berndt Keller (2013), Atypische Beschäftigung zwischen Prekarität und Normalität. Entwicklung, Strukturen und Bestimmungsgründe im Überblick (Atypical Employment between Precarity and Nomality. Development, Structures and Determining Factors at a Glance) (in German), Berlin: sigma-verlag
- Hartmut Seifert, Toralf Pusch (2022), "Betriebliche Bündnisse sichern Beschäftigung (Company-based agreements safeguard jobs)", Wirtschaftsdienst (in German), 102 (8): 625–628, doi:10.1007/s10273-022-3261-x, hdl:10419/267061, S2CID 252229985
