= John Fox (American football) =

American football player and coach (born 1955)

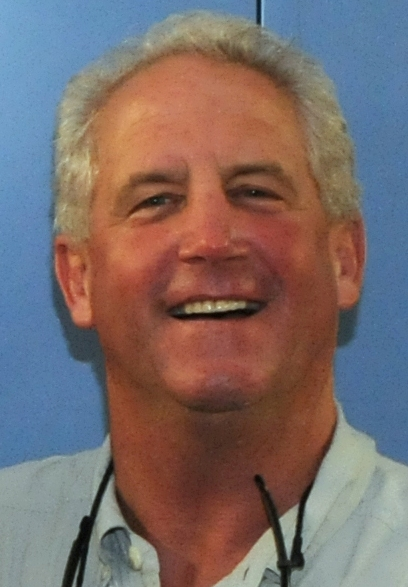
- Fox in 2010

Buffalo Bills
- Title: Senior assistant

Personal information
- Born: February 8, 1955 (age 71); Virginia Beach, Virginia, U.S.

Career information
- High school: Castle Park (Chula Vista, California)
- College: Southwestern (CA); San Diego State
- NFL draft: 1978: undrafted

Career history

Playing
- Tampa Bay Buccaneers (1978)*
- * Offseason or practice squad member only

Coaching
- San Diego State (1978) Graduate assistant; U.S. International (1979) Defensive backs coach; Boise State (1980) Defensive backs coach; Long Beach State (1981) Defensive backs coach; Utah (1982) Defensive backs coach; Kansas (1983) Defensive backs coach; Iowa State (1984) Defensive backs coach; Los Angeles Express (1985) Defensive backs coach; Pittsburgh (1986–1988) Defensive coordinator & defensive backs coach; Pittsburgh Steelers (1989–1991) Defensive backs coach; San Diego Chargers (1992–1993) Defensive backs coach; Los Angeles/Oakland Raiders (1994–1995) Defensive coordinator; St. Louis Rams (1996) Personnel consultant; New York Giants (1997–2001) Defensive coordinator; Carolina Panthers (2002–2010) Head coach; Denver Broncos (2011–2014) Head coach; Chicago Bears (2015–2017) Head coach; Indianapolis Colts (2022) Senior defensive assistant; Detroit Lions (2023) Senior defensive assistant; Buffalo Bills (2026–present) Senior assistant

Awards and highlights
- FCS national champion (1980)

Head coaching record
- Regular season: 133–123 (.520)
- Postseason: 8–7 (.533)
- Career: 141–130 (.520)
- Coaching profile at Pro Football Reference

John Fox (born February 8, 1955) is an American football coach and former player who serves as a senior assistant for the Buffalo Bills of the National Football League (NFL). He was the head coach of the Carolina Panthers (2002–2010), Denver Broncos (2011–2014), and Chicago Bears (2015–2017) of the NFL. He coached the Panthers to an appearance in Super Bowl XXXVIII and the Broncos to an appearance in Super Bowl XLVIII.

== Playing career ==
Fox attended Castle Park High School in Chula Vista, California, where he played football under local celebrated coaches Gil Warren and Reldon "Bing" Dawson. He played two years at Southwestern College also in Chula Vista from 1974 to 1975 before walking on at San Diego State, where he played defensive back with future NFL player and head coach Herman Edwards. Fox received a bachelor's degree in physical education and earned teaching credentials from San Diego State. He then proceeded to the NFL as a free agent and signed a two-year contract with the Tampa Bay Buccaneers. After that contract was over he retired from the NFL.

== Coaching career ==
=== Early years ===
Fox was defensive backs coach at U.S. International University. Sid Gillman, past head coach of the San Diego Chargers, was the athletic director at the time. In 1980, Fox was the defensive backs coach for the Boise State University Broncos when they won the NCAA Division I-AA Football Championship. In 1983, Fox was a member of Mike Gottfried's University of Kansas staff, as the secondary coach. Fox followed Gottfried to the University of Pittsburgh when Gottfried became head coach at Pitt in 1986. Fox was first the Defensive Backs coach and then was promoted to Defensive Coordinator by Gottfried. While at Pitt, Fox made some contacts with Pittsburgh Steeler coaches and when Gottfried was let go by Pitt, Fox got his first NFL coaching gig with the Steelers.

=== USFL career ===
Fox began his first professional football coaching stint in the short-lived United States Football League with the Los Angeles Express in 1985.

=== NFL career ===
He entered the NFL in 1989 as the secondary coach of the Pittsburgh Steelers, later also holding this job with the San Diego Chargers. Fox was the defensive coordinator for the Los Angeles Raiders and later for the New York Giants during Super Bowl XXXV, which they lost.

==== Carolina Panthers ====
On January 25, 2002, Fox was signed as the third head coach of the Carolina Panthers, whose previous coach George Seifert had led the team to a disastrous 1–15 record in 2001, including 15 consecutive losses to end the season. Fox's first regular season game was a 10–7 victory over the Baltimore Ravens which ended the Panthers' 15-game losing streak dating to the previous season. Fox and the Panthers posted a 7–9 record for the 2002 season (his first with the team), demonstrating a drastic improvement over the previous season.

In the 2003 season Fox led the Panthers to Super Bowl XXXVIII, losing 32–29 to the New England Patriots on a last-second field goal by Adam Vinatieri. Fox joined Vince Lombardi as the only other coach to inherit a team that had won only one game in the season prior, and then take that team to an NFL Championship game. Fox also took the Carolina Panthers to the NFC Championship game in the 2005 season, but they were defeated by the Seattle Seahawks.

The 2006 season was disappointing for Fox and the Panthers, as a team that had Super Bowl aspirations finished 8–8 and out of the playoffs.

The 2007 season saw the team finish with a record of 7–9, before rebounding to a 12–4 record in the 2008 season. It was tied for the best record in franchise history and earned them a #2 seed with a Divisional Round game at home. They were then upset by the #4 seed Arizona Cardinals, who went on the Super Bowl weeks later.

The 2009 season was disappointing to Fox and the Panthers much like 2006. The Panthers finished the season 8–8 and in third place in the NFC South division, missing the playoffs again.

The 2010 season saw the Panthers finish last in the league, at 2–14. As of this time, Fox was one of only two coaches, and the only one as a head coach, still working on the NFL sidelines that was once a member of former Pittsburgh Steelers head coach Chuck Noll's coaching staff, the other being Minnesota Vikings wide receivers coach George Stewart. Tom Moore, currently an offensive consultant for the Tampa Bay Buccaneers, is still active in the league but works from home.

On December 31, 2010, Carolina Panthers owner Jerry Richardson announced that he would not be renewing Fox's contract at the conclusion of the 2010 season.

==== Denver Broncos ====
On January 13, 2011, Fox was selected to be the 14th head coach of the Denver Broncos. He was signed to a 4-year $14 million deal. He was chosen by the Broncos out of a list of five possible head coach candidates that included Broncos interim head coach and running backs coach Eric Studesville, Atlanta Falcons offensive coordinator Dirk Koetter, Houston Texans offensive coordinator Rick Dennison and New York Giants defensive coordinator Perry Fewell. Fox was chosen based on his previous head coaching experience plus his 20+ years as an NFL coach. At the conclusion of the 2011 season, the Broncos finished tied for 3rd in the NFL in sacks and 1st in rushing offense, again with Fox.

In April 2012, Fox received a three-year contract extension worth between $5 million and $6 million per year, replacing his contract that expired at the end of the 2014 NFL season.

In week two of the 2012 season, Fox was fined $30,000 for chiding the replacement officials. The Broncos would go on to win their last 11 games after a 2–3 start. In week 17 of the 2012 season, Fox won his 100th career game as an NFL head coach, including the playoffs, beating the Kansas City Chiefs 38–3. However, the Broncos were upset in the divisional playoffs to the Baltimore Ravens, in double-overtime.

Owing to a cardiac-related issue, starting with week 10 of 2013, Fox was replaced by Broncos defensive coordinator Jack Del Rio as Fox underwent an aortic valve replacement. Fox, while playing golf in North Carolina near his offseason home in Charlotte during the Broncos bye week, reported feeling dizzy and was taken for examination to the hospital, where doctors told him not to put off valve replacement surgery any longer; he had done so earlier in the year to continue coaching this season. On November 4, Fox temporarily relinquished his head coaching duties, and Del Rio was named interim head coach for the remainder of the 2013 season regular season. Fox then underwent successful aortic valve replacement surgery.

In the 2013 NFL season, quarterback Peyton Manning threw for 5,477 yards and 55 touchdowns, both records, and the offense combined for 7,317 yards, also a record. Fox coached the Broncos to Super Bowl XLVIII, where they played the NFC champion Seattle Seahawks. He is one of four head coaches to win both an NFC and an AFC championship game along with Bill Parcells, Dan Reeves, and Andy Reid, and one of seven coaches to reach the Super Bowl with multiple teams. On February 2, 2014, the Broncos lost to the Seahawks 43–8.

Fox coached the Broncos to another strong season in 2014; the Broncos finished the regular season 12–4. They earned the AFC's number 2 seed and a first-round playoff bye. Hosting Peyton Manning's former team, the Indianapolis Colts at home in the Divisional Round, the Broncos were upset 24–13 and were eliminated from the playoffs.

On January 12, 2015, the day after Denver lost in the Divisional Round of the playoffs, Fox and the Broncos mutually agreed to part ways. Fox left the Broncos with the highest regular season win percentage in team history. However, general manager John Elway felt the Broncos hadn't shown enough fight at critical times in the playoffs.

Fox is only the second head coach in NFL history to win four straight division titles since joining a new team, and also the only head coach in Broncos history to have never missed the playoffs in their tenure.

==== Chicago Bears ====
On January 16, 2015, Fox accepted a four-year deal to become head coach of the Chicago Bears. Fox led the Bears to a 6–10 record in his first season, only the second time in his career where he had double-digit losses. In the third game of the season, a 26–0 road loss against the Seattle Seahawks, the Bears punted on all of its ten possessions, the only time a team has punted on all of its possessions at least since 1980.

Fox finished his second season with the Bears with a 3–13 record, tied for the worst record by the Bears since the NFL changed to a 16-game season, as well as the first consecutive losing season in Fox's head coaching career.

After a 1–3 start in 2017, Fox benched quarterback Mike Glennon in favor of rookie Mitchell Trubisky in Week 5. With Trubisky, the Bears finished the season 5–11, and Fox was fired at the season's end on January 1, 2018. His overall record with the Bears was 14–34, the second-lowest win percentage in franchise history, as the team failed to record a winning streak longer than two games and finished last in the NFC North in all three seasons.

==== Indianapolis Colts ====
On March 27, 2022, it was announced that Fox was hired by the Indianapolis Colts to be their senior defensive assistant under head coach Frank Reich. This was Fox's first coaching position after a 5-year hiatus and his first as an assistant coach in 21 years.

==== Detroit Lions ====
On February 28, 2023, it was announced that Fox was hired by the Detroit Lions to be their senior defensive assistant. In February 2024, it was announced that he would not return to the Lions for the 2024 season.

==== Buffalo Bills ====
On February 13, 2026, it was announced that Fox was hired by the Buffalo Bills to be a senior assistant. He was recommended to Bills head coach Joe Brady by general manager Brandon Beane, who had worked alongside Fox in Carolina.

== Broadcasting career ==
On March 20, 2018, ESPN announced that Fox would be hired to work as a studio analyst for NFL Live.

== Personal life ==
Fox was born in Virginia Beach, Virginia, and raised in San Diego, California, after moving there at age 15. His stepfather, Ron, was a US Navy SEAL. Fox and his wife, Robin, have four children. Known to his friends as "Foxy", he is an active community leader in the Carolinas. He and his wife co-chair the annual Angels & Stars Gala, which benefits St. Jude Children's Research Hospital.

== Head coaching record ==
| Team | Year | Regular season | | | | | Postseason | | | |
| Team | Year | Won | Lost | Ties | Win % | Finish | Won | Lost | Win % | Result |
|---|---|---|---|---|---|---|---|---|---|---|
| CAR | 2002 | 7 | 9 | 0 | .438 | 4th in NFC South | - | - | - | - |
| CAR | 2003 | 11 | 5 | 0 | .688 | 1st in NFC South | 3 | 1 | .750 | Lost to New England Patriots in Super Bowl XXXVIII |
| CAR | 2004 | 7 | 9 | 0 | .438 | 3rd in NFC South | - | - | - | - |
| CAR | 2005 | 11 | 5 | 0 | .688 | 2nd in NFC South | 2 | 1 | .667 | Lost to Seattle Seahawks in NFC Championship Game |
| CAR | 2006 | 8 | 8 | 0 | .500 | 2nd in NFC South | - | - | - | - |
| CAR | 2007 | 7 | 9 | 0 | .438 | 2nd in NFC South | - | - | - | - |
| CAR | 2008 | 12 | 4 | 0 | .750 | 1st in NFC South | 0 | 1 | .000 | Lost to Arizona Cardinals in NFC Divisional Game |
| CAR | 2009 | 8 | 8 | 0 | .500 | 3rd in NFC South | - | - | - | - |
| CAR | 2010 | 2 | 14 | 0 | .125 | 4th in NFC South | - | - | - | - |
| CAR total | | 73 | 71 | 0 | .507 | | 5 | 3 | .625 | |
| DEN | 2011 | 8 | 8 | 0 | .500 | 1st in AFC West | 1 | 1 | .500 | Lost to New England Patriots in AFC Divisional Game |
| DEN | 2012 | 13 | 3 | 0 | .813 | 1st in AFC West | 0 | 1 | .000 | Lost to Baltimore Ravens in AFC Divisional Game |
| DEN | 2013 | 13 | 3 | 0 | .813 | 1st in AFC West | 2 | 1 | .667 | Lost to Seattle Seahawks in Super Bowl XLVIII |
| DEN | 2014 | 12 | 4 | 0 | .750 | 1st in AFC West | 0 | 1 | .000 | Lost to Indianapolis Colts in AFC Divisional Game |
| DEN total | | 46 | 18 | 0 | .719 | | 3 | 4 | .428 | |
| CHI | 2015 | 6 | 10 | 0 | .375 | 4th in NFC North | - | - | - | - |
| CHI | 2016 | 3 | 13 | 0 | .188 | 4th in NFC North | - | - | - | - |
| CHI | 2017 | 5 | 11 | 0 | .313 | 4th in NFC North | - | - | - | - |
| CHI total | | 14 | 34 | 0 | .292 | | 0 | 0 | .000 | |
| Total | | 133 | 123 | 0 | .520 | | 8 | 7 | .533 | |

== See also ==
- List of National Football League head coach wins leaders
