= Seyfert =

Seyfert is a surname, and may refer to:

- Carl Keenan Seyfert (1911–1960), United States astronomer
- Gabriele Seyfert (born 1948), German athlete in figure skating
- J. Michael Seyfert (born 1959), German Mexican documentary filmmaker, photographer
- Johann Caspar Seyfert (1697–1767), German music composer
- Johann Gottfried Seyfert (1731–1772), German music composer, son of Johann Caspar Seyfert
- R. Tracy Seyfert (born 1941), United States political figure from Pennsylvania

== Other uses ==
- Seyfert (crater), a crater on the far side of Earth's Moon that is named after Carl Keenan Seyfert
- Seyfert Galaxy, a class of galaxies named after Carl Keenan Seyfert
- Seyfert's Sextet, a group of galaxies located in a cluster some 190 million light-years from Earth

== See also ==
- Seifert, surname
- Seiffert, surname
- Siefert, surname
