= Reed Seifer =

American artist (born 1973)

- Born: 1973 (age 52–53)
- Occupation: Artist
- Website: www.reedseifer.com

Reed Seifer (born 1973) is an American artist working in New York City.

== Career ==
Seifer created "optimism MetroCard", a public-art project produced in collaboration with the MTA Arts & Design, and launched in 2009. The artwork involved a wordmark designed by the artist placed on the reverse of 14,000,000 MetroCards, New York City's public transportation pass.

In solo exhibitions at The Armory Show, 2010 and 2011, Reed Seifer presented projects "Spray to Forget" and "New York Is a Lot of Work.", respectively.

"Spray to Forget," is an interactive, aromatherapeutic work proposed to "edit one's consciousness" and remove "undesired memories" by spraying it. "New York Is a Lot of Work." is an edition of 1,000 American one-dollar bills imprinted in foil with the text, "New York is a lot of work." in black and white.

Seifer's work has also been exhibited at Art Platform—Los Angeles, Los Angeles, California; Hunt Gallery, Webster University, St. Louis; Clark University, Worcester, Massachusetts; ISCP and Proteus Gowanus in Brooklyn, New York; DC Moore Gallery, HERE Arts Center, and Printed Matter in New York City, New York; and Huize Frankendael, Amsterdam.
