= Japan Institute for Labour Policy and Training =

Independent Administrative Institution

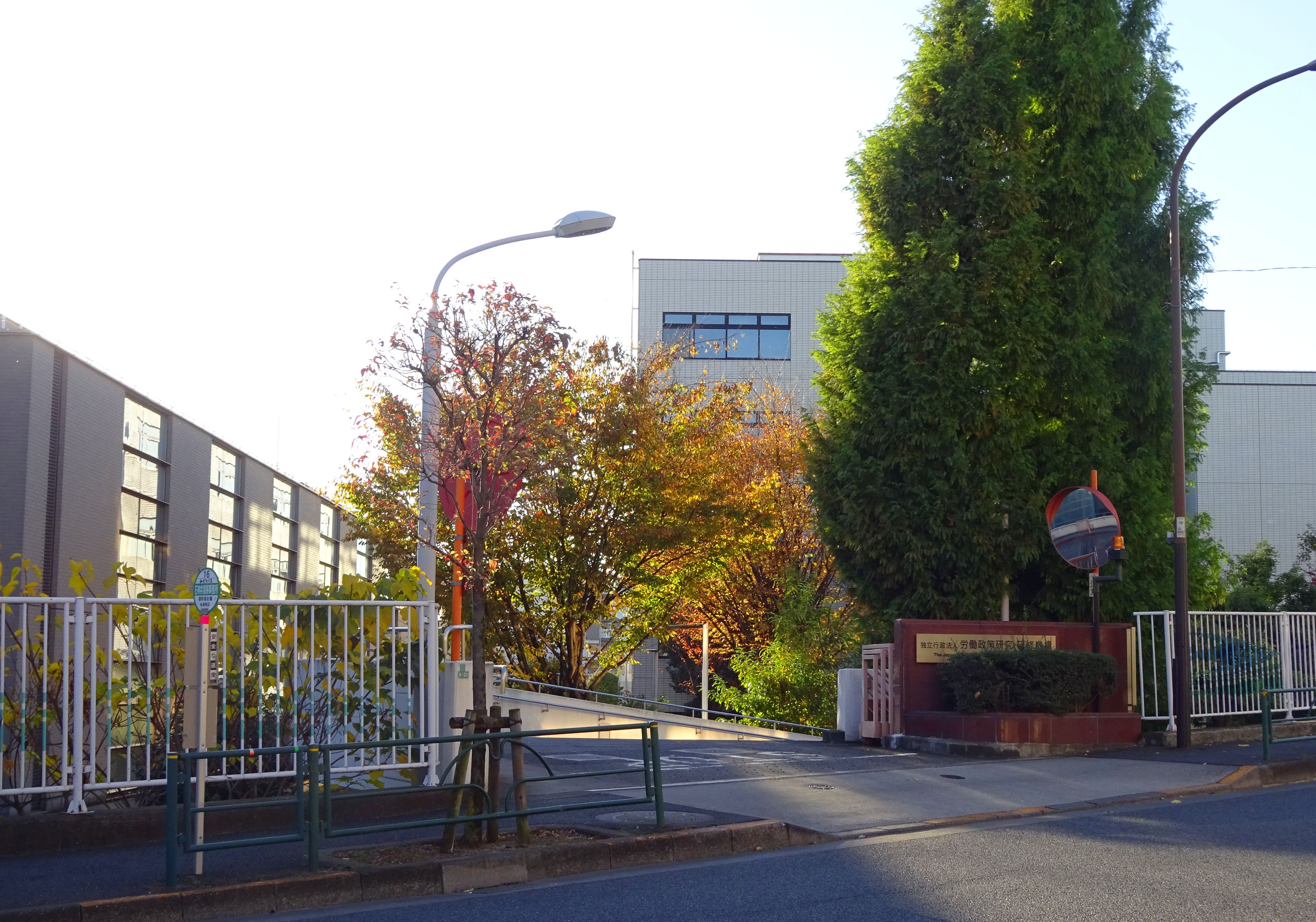

The Japan Institute for Labour Policy and Training (独立行政法人労働政策研究・研修機構, Rōdō seisaku kenkyū kenshū kikō; JILPT) is an Independent Administrative Institution under the supervision of the Ministry of Health, Labour and Welfare. It was established in 2003 with the integration of the Research Institution of Labour (日本労働研究機構) and the Institute of Labour Training (労働研修所). The institute is concerned with working conditions and safety for members of the Japanese work force.
