= Michael Seifert =

Michael Seifert may refer to:

- Michael Seifert (producer), music producer, writer, arranger and recording engineer
- Michael Seifert (programmer) (born 1969), Danish computer programmer, inventor and businessman
- Michael Seifert (SS guard) (1924–2010), SS guard in Italy during World War II
- Mike Seifert (born 1951), American football defensive end
- Michael Seifert, heavy metal vocalist in bands Rebellion and Wolfchant
