= George Seifert =

American football coach (born 1940)

Personal information
- Born: January 22, 1940 (age 86); San Francisco, California, U.S.

Career information
- High school: San Francisco Polytechnic
- College: Utah

Career history
- Utah (1964) Graduate assistant; Westminster (UT) (1965) Head coach; Iowa (1966) Graduate assistant; Oregon (1967–1971) Defensive backs coach; Stanford (1972–1974) Defensive backs coach; Cornell (1975–1976) Head coach; Stanford (1977–1979) Defensive backs coach; San Francisco 49ers (1980–1982) Defensive backs coach; San Francisco 49ers (1983–1988) Defensive coordinator; San Francisco 49ers (1989–1996) Head coach; Carolina Panthers (1999–2001) Head coach

Awards and highlights
- As a head coach: 2× Super Bowl champion (XXIV, XXIX); San Francisco 49ers Hall of Fame; As an assistant coach: 3× Super Bowl champion (XVI, XIX, XXIII)

Head coaching record
- Regular season: 114–62 (.648) (NFL); 6–18 (.250) (college)
- Postseason: 10–5 (.667)
- Career: 124–67 (.649); 6–18 (.250) (college)
- Coaching profile at Pro Football Reference
- Executive profile at Pro Football Reference

George Gerald Seifert (born January 22, 1940) is an American former football coach. He served as the head coach for the San Francisco 49ers and the Carolina Panthers of the National Football League (NFL). Seifert owned the second-greatest winning percentage in NFL history by a head coach at the time of his resignation as the 49ers head coach, second to Guy Chamberlin. Among coaches with at least 100 wins, his winning percentage is fifth best in football history.

== Early life ==
Seifert was born and raised in San Francisco. He ushered at 49ers home games at Kezar Stadium while he attended San Francisco Polytechnic High School across the street. Seifert planned to attend the California Polytechnic State University, San Luis Obispo but a few days before being scheduled to attend classes in August 1958, he was offered a scholarship at the University of Utah. He played guard and linebacker for the Utes.

== Early coaching career ==
He served as graduate assistant at his alma mater for a year before being hired as head coach of Westminster College in Salt Lake City at age 25, where he led the Parsons to a 3–3 record.

After working as an assistant at the University of Iowa, the University of Oregon, and Stanford University, Seifert was hired as head coach at Cornell University, then fired in November 1976 after going 3–15 (.167) in two seasons. He then returned to Stanford in 1977, where he met Bill Walsh. When Walsh moved to the 49ers in 1979, Seifert joined his coaching staff the following year as the team's defensive backs coach. Seifert was promoted to defensive coordinator in 1983.

As a 49er assistant, Seifert defenses finished in the top ten in fewest points allowed in each of his six seasons in that capacity: fourth in 1983, first in 1984, second in 1985, third in 1986 and 1987, and eighth in 1988. His final two defenses, 1987 and 1988, finished first and third in fewest yards allowed, respectively.

== Head coaching career ==
=== San Francisco 49ers (1989–1996) ===
On Seifert's 49th birthday, the 49ers won Super Bowl XXIII over the Cincinnati Bengals. Four days later, on January 26, 1989, Seifert was promoted to succeed Walsh as 49ers head coach as Walsh moved to the front office; owner Edward J. DeBartolo Jr. wanted a "name coach" but Walsh's push for Seifert won out, which happened as the Cleveland Browns wanted to interview Seifert for the job. He would soon be characterized as a coach with intense focus and superstition, whether that involved bluntness or not walking across the 49ers helmet spraypainted on the practice turf. Seifert coached his first game as a head coach against the Indianapolis Colts and saw a 30–24 victory that got the ball rolling for a dominant season. Bolstered by an MVP season from Joe Montana to go with a highly ranked defense, the 49ers went 14–2 (losing those two games by a combined total of five points) to clinch the #1 seed in the playoffs. They defeated the Minnesota Vikings in the Divisional Round and the Los Angeles Rams in the NFC Championship Game to reach Super Bowl XXIV. They beat the Denver Broncos 55–10, the worst defeat for a team in Super Bowl history; that 49ers team is considered one of the best ever. Seifert was the first rookie head coach to win the Super Bowl since Don McCafferty in Super Bowl V.

The 1990 team tried to return to the Super Bowl for a possible "three-peat", which started with ten straight wins to start the season. They finished with a record of 14–2, handily above the second seed New York Giants. The two teams would meet in the NFC Championship Game at Candlestick Park for a highly contested defensive affair; the teams were tied 6–6 at halftime. Montana was knocked out of the game on a rough hit while trying to preserve a 13–9 lead in which New York did not score a touchdown, but a late Roger Craig fumble got the Giants another chance and they drove down the field to kick a game-winning field goal and end the 49ers season; it was only the second postseason loss at home since 1981. As it would turn out, it was the last postseason game for Montana and Craig as 49ers, as an elbow injury knocked Montana out of 1991 and most of 1992 and Craig left in free agency. Steve Young went on to become the starting quarterback for the 49ers, with Montana getting traded in 1993.

The 1991 season saw the departure of Craig and Ronnie Lott. The 49ers lost four of their first six games. A narrow 10–3 loss to the New Orleans Saints had the team at 4–6. From that point, the 49ers won the last six games in a row, but in the last game of the year, they did not control their playoff hopes. The Atlanta Falcons held the tiebreaker with their two wins over San Francisco to sneak in as the sixth seed, while New Orleans had 11 wins to win the division. San Francisco missed the playoffs for the first time since 1982.

The 1992 team (where Seifert ceded a portion of the playcalling on offense to his coordinator) saw the 49ers engage in history with the "No Punt Game" against the Buffalo Bills in a 34–31 loss. It was one of only two losses for the team that year as the 49ers won eight straight games to close out the regular season with the #1 seed at 14–2, as Steve Young went on to be named the league's MVP. The 49ers rolled over the Washington Redskins to reach the NFC Championship Game against the Dallas Cowboys in San Francisco. A four turnover day could not be overcome as Dallas took the lead in the second quarter and never let go in a 30–20 victory.

The 1993 team went to the NFC Championship Game for the fifth time in the last six seasons, although they had a shaky start, winning three of their first six games. They ran off six straight wins to get to 9–3 before stumbling onto one win in their last four games, ranking as the #2 seed. They won the Divisional playoff game against the New York Giants 44–3 but had to go to the #1 seed Dallas Cowboys for the NFC Championship Game, where Dallas scored 21 second quarter points in a 38–21 rout.

Seifert and the 49ers had a tremendous 1994 season that saw Young win another MVP award with a historic passer rating (112.8), as the team scored a franchise record 505 points. They went 13–3 and dominated their competition in the playoffs, with the closest game being a 38–28 victory over the Dallas Cowboys in the NFC Championship Game. The 49–26 victory over the San Diego Chargers in Super Bowl XXIX was historic as Young threw for six touchdown passes, and Seifert became one of few coaches with multiple Super Bowl championships.

The 1995 and 1996 seasons saw San Francisco reach the postseason each time only to lose to the Green Bay Packers in the Divisional Round, the latter being a 35–14 rout on the road. Walsh had been hired as an offensive assistant prior to the 1996 season, which had been seen in some way as a sign of Seifert's vulnerability as head coach, and he himself thought the year would be like 1994 as "another live-or-die season" (the previous year, he had let defensive coordinator Pete Carroll have the responsibilities of the defense). Despite owning the best winning percentage of any NFL head coach in the league's history, 49ers management did not offer an extension on Seifert's contract. 49ers team president Carmen Policy desired to hire California head coach Steve Mariucci to the same position in the 49ers organization. Policy offered Seifert the opportunity to remain head coach for the final year of his contract, with Mariucci serving as offensive coordinator and head coach-in-waiting. Seifert then resigned. His 98 wins are still the most in franchise history.

=== Carolina Panthers (1999–2001) ===
After two years out of the game, Seifert was hired by the Carolina Panthers as head coach. He was also de facto general manager; the Panthers had not had a general manager since Bill Polian's departure in 1997. During his first training camp with the Panthers, he told his players that they should not act like wildebeests. He explained that wildebeests usually give up when caught by a lion. "Don't be that wildebeest," he said. "Don't give up."

In his first season, Seifert led the Panthers to an 8–8 record, a four-game improvement from 1998. The most notable play of that year came when quarterback Steve Beuerlein scored a game-winning touchdown on a fourth-and-five quarterback draw with five seconds left in the fourth quarter to defeat the Green Bay Packers. The Panthers went into the final day of the regular season in contention for a playoff berth; however, their victory margin over the New Orleans Saints needed to be 18 points greater than the Packers' margin over the Arizona Cardinals in order to make the playoffs. While the Panthers routed the Saints 45–13, the Packers beat the Cardinals 49–24, leaving the Packers ahead on point differential and eliminating the Panthers.

The Panthers were competitive for most of 2000 as well but needed to win their season finale against the Oakland Raiders to finish at .500. Instead, the Raiders won in a 52–9 rout, still one of the most lopsided losses in Carolina history, and the Panthers finished with a 7–9 record. Seifert presided over the 2001 NFL draft, which netted the Panthers Steve Smith and Kris Jenkins, two cornerstones of the franchise. Seifert made the push to not retain Beuerlein as the starting quarterback, instead going with Jeff Lewis (signed in 1999) as the intended starter. However, Lewis struggled mightily in the preseason, leading Seifert to cut Lewis before the season even started, as 29-year-old rookie quarterback Chris Weinke was tabbed to start for the team. In the first game of the season, they pulled off a shocking upset of the defending NFC Central champion Minnesota Vikings, winning 24–13. They followed up that impressive victory by losing every game the rest of the year, finishing at 1–15 (with nine losses by eight points or less), the worst record in franchise history. The Panthers' final two games were played before what are still the two smallest crowds in franchise history (in terms of turnstile count), including a 38–6 loss to the New England Patriots that drew only 21,000 people. After the game, Seifert announced that he was planning to return for the 2002 season. Team owner Jerry Richardson had other plans, however, firing Seifert the following day. Richardson stated that the energy "has been sucked out of our organization and our fan base. In my opinion, we had no alternative.” Wesley Walls, who played for Seifert in both San Francisco and Carolina, stated that Seifert lacked a cohesive leadership in the locker room with the Panthers, saying that when the team started to get worse, "we felt like he kind of disappeared a little bit from us", while not placing the blame fully on Seifert. For his part, Seifert said he had no hard feelings or regrets about how his tenure went down in Carolina, only wishing they had won more games.

Seifert is the first head coach since the implementation of the 16-game schedule in place from 1978 to 2020 to guide a team to 15 consecutive losses following a Week 1 victory. Seifert's dubious distinction would be matched by Doug Marrone of the 2020 Jacksonville Jaguars.

== Head coaching record ==
=== National Football League ===
Team	Year	Regular season					Postseason			
Team	Year	Won	Lost	Ties	Win %	Finish	Won	Lost	Win %	Result
SF	1989	14	2	0	.875	1st in NFC West	3	0	1.000	Super Bowl XXIV champions
SF	1990	14	2	0	.875	1st in NFC West	1	1	.500	Lost to New York Giants in NFC Championship Game
SF	1991	10	6	0	.625	3rd in NFC West	—	—	—	—
SF	1992	14	2	0	.875	1st in NFC West	1	1	.500	Lost to Dallas Cowboys in NFC Championship Game
SF	1993	10	6	0	.625	1st in NFC West	1	1	.500	Lost to Dallas Cowboys in NFC Championship Game
SF	1994	13	3	0	.813	1st in NFC West	3	0	1.000	Super Bowl XXIX champions
SF	1995	11	5	0	.688	1st in NFC West	0	1	.000	Lost to Green Bay Packers in NFC Divisional Game
SF	1996	12	4	0	.750	2nd in NFC West	1	1	.500	Lost to Green Bay Packers in NFC Divisional Game
SF Total		98	30	0	.766		10	5	.667	
CAR	1999	8	8	0	.500	2nd in NFC West	—	—	—	—
CAR	2000	7	9	0	.438	3rd in NFC West	—	—	—	—
CAR	2001	1	15	0	.062	5th in NFC West	—	—	—	—
CAR Total		16	32	0	.333		—	—	—	
Total		114	62	0	.648		10	5	.667	

=== College ===
Year	Team	Overall	Conference	Standing
Westminster Parsons (NAIA independent) (1965)
1965	Westminster	3–3		
Westminster:		3–3		
Cornell Big Red (Ivy League) (1975–1976)
1975	Cornell	1–8	0–7	8th
1976	Cornell	2–7	2–5	T–5th
Cornell:		3–15	2–12	
Total:		6–18		

== Broadcasting stint ==
CBS Sports hired Seifert to serve as a panelist for The NFL Today in its first season after CBS regained NFL broadcast rights (for the AFC) in 1998. His performance was not well received, however, and the network removed him before the end of the regular season.

== Personal life ==
Seifert currently resides in Bodega Bay, California and Incline Village, Nevada with his wife Linda. They have two children, Eve and Jason.

== See also ==
- List of National Football League head coaches with 50 wins
- List of Super Bowl head coaches
