= Siefert =

Siefert is a surname. Notable people with the surname include:

- Annemarie Gethmann-Siefert (born 1945), professor of philosophy at the University of Hagen, Germany
- Janet Siefert, origin of life researcher
- Louisa Siefert (1845–1877), French poet
- Paul Siefert, (1586–1666), German composer and organist
- Silvia Siefert (born 1953), former East German Olympic handball medalist

== See also ==
- Seifert
- Seyfert (disambiguation)
