= Seneca Caverns =

Seneca Caverns may refer to:

- Seneca Caverns (Ohio)
- Seneca Caverns (West Virginia)
