= Seybert =

Seybert is a spelling variant of the German language surname Seibert. Notable people with the name include:

- Adam Seybert (1773–1825), politician from Philadelphia
- Joanna Seybert (1946), United States federal judge
- John Seybert (1791–1860), American bishop
