= Seneca Caverns (West Virginia) =

Cave in Pendleton County, West Virginia

Coordinates: 38.76344°N 79.38860°W

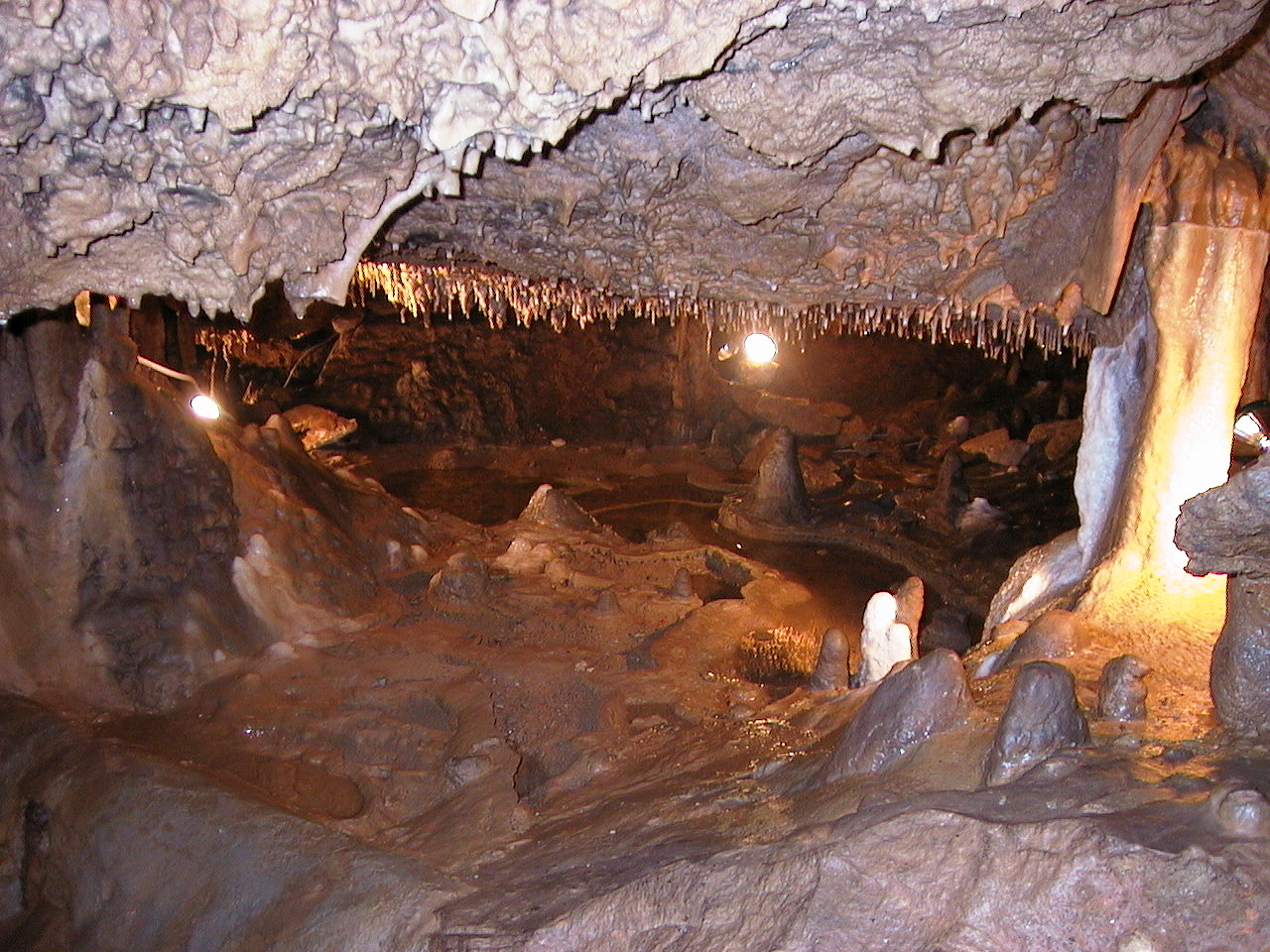
- Fairyland in Seneca Caverns
- Interactive map of Seneca Caverns
- Location: Riverton, West Virginia
- Depth: Unknown
- Length: Unknown
- Discovery: 1770s or '80s
- Geology: Limestone
- Entrances: Two, and a separate, now closed cave called Stratosphere Cave on the property.
- Access: Fee

Seneca Caverns is a karst show cave in Germany Valley near Riverton, West Virginia, USA. It has been operational since 1930. The largest room inside the cave is the Teter Hall, which is 60 feet tall by 60 feet wide in some areas.

== History ==
A German-American settler named Phillip Dieter (later Teter; 1740-1813) purchased the land surrounding Seneca Caverns in the 1770s. He may have first entered the cave on a quest for water to supply his livestock. The first recorded entry into the cave was in 1781 by the Rev. Francis Asbury. The Teter family maintained ownership until 1928, at which point it became property of the Harman family, who began the process of commercializing the cave. In 1930 the new owners opened it to the public as a show cave. The property was acquired in 1984 by Greer Limestone.

== Gallery ==
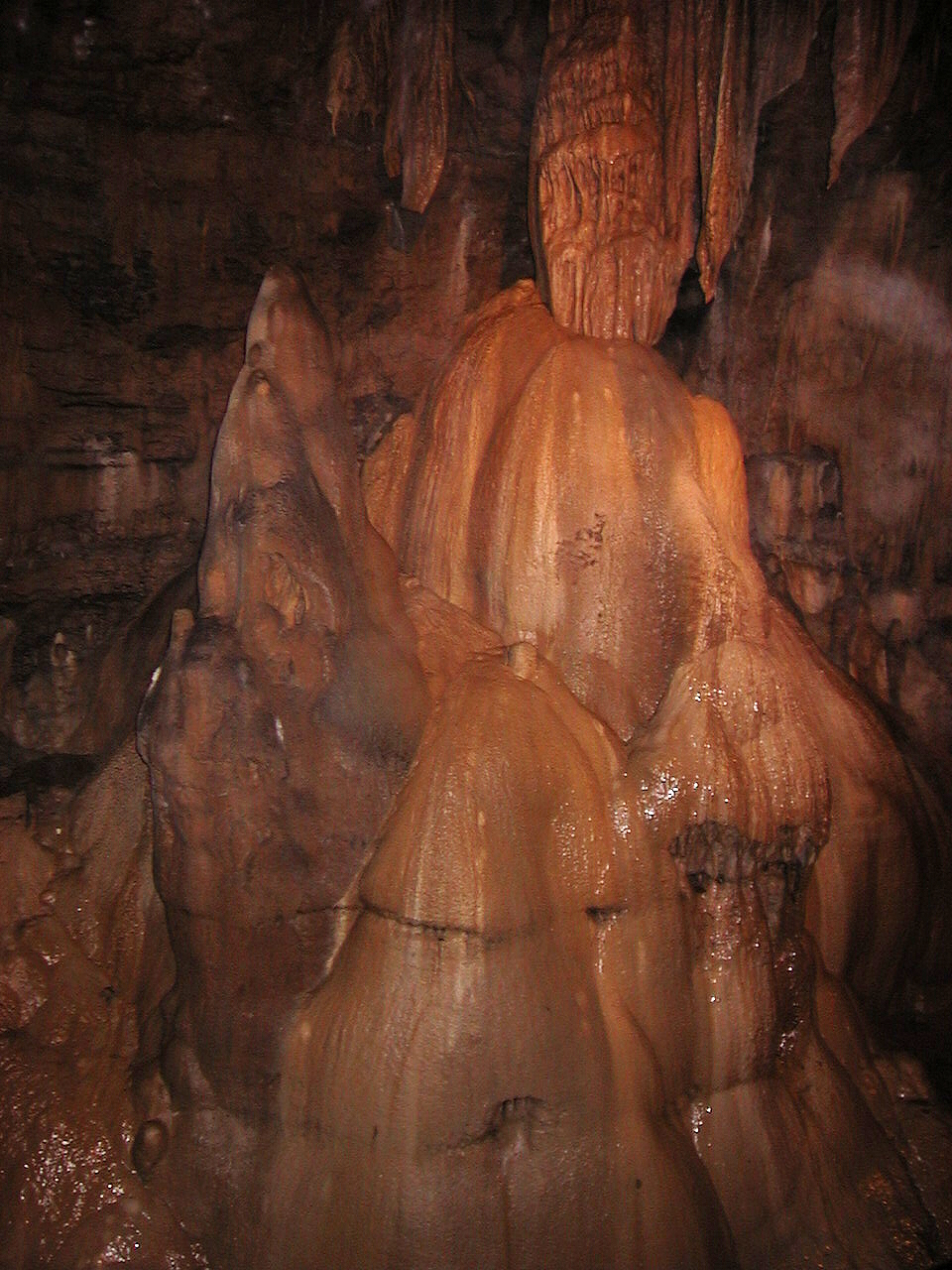
'Castle on the Rhine'

== See also ==
- Smoke Hole Caverns
- Seneca Caverns (Ohio)
