= William B. Oden =

American bishop (1935–2018)

William Bryant Oden (1935–2018) was an American bishop of the United Methodist Church, elected in 1988. He was born 3 August 1935 in McAllen, Texas. He was married to Marilyn Brown Oden, the author of over eight books. They have four children and four grandchildren.

== Education ==
William graduated from Oklahoma State University earning a B.A. in Philosophy. He earned the M.Div. degree from Harvard University, and the Th.D. from Boston University.

== Ordained ministry ==
Prior to his election to the episcopacy, William served as pastor of Aldersgate U.M.C., Oklahoma City, Oklahoma (1963–69); St. Stephen's U.M.C., Norman, Oklahoma (1969–76); Crown Heights U.M.C., Oklahoma City (1976–83) and First U.M.C., Enid, Oklahoma (1983–88).

William was elected a delegate to four U.M. General Conferences and six Jurisdictional Conferences. He led the Oklahoma clergy delegation in 1984 and 1988. He chaired three Conference Boards: Ordained Ministry, Evangelism, and Higher Education. He was active in other conference leadership positions as well. He was appointed a member of the Governor's Blue Ribbon Commission on Government Reform in Oklahoma, co-chairing the Committee on City-State Government Relations. During his last ten years as a pastor, he also served on the faculty of Phillips Graduate Seminary, where he taught courses in preaching, worship, and spiritual formation.

== Episcopal ministry ==
Upon his election to the episcopacy, Bishop Oden was assigned to the Louisiana Episcopal Area (1988–96). He then served the Dallas Area until his retirement in 2004. He was the president of the U.M. Council of Bishops (2000–01). He served as president of the U.M. General Board of Higher Education and Ministry (1996-2000), and president of the U.M. Commission on Communications (2000–04). He has also served on the executive committee of the World Methodist Council and as a co-chair of the United Methodist/Episcopal Church Dialogue.

As bishop he was much in demand as a speaker at numerous conferences and lectureships. He was the Jackson Lecturer at Perkins School of Theology, and the visiting preacher for the Boston University School of Theology. He has also served as trustee at numerous institutions, including the Methodist Hospital of Dallas, and S.M.U. (also serving as secretary of board of trustees).

== Selected writings ==
- Wordeed: Evangelism in Biblical/Wesleyan Perspective.
- Liturgy as Life Journey.
- Oklahoma Methodism in the Twentieth Century.
- a chapter in Send Me? The Itineracy in Crisis.
- has also contributed to devotional guides and theological journals, including Quarterly Review.

== See also ==
- List of bishops of the United Methodist Church
