= Bishop =

Leadership position in religious institutions

In Christianity, a bishop is an ordained member of the clergy who is entrusted with a position of authority and oversight in a religious institution. Bishops are normally responsible for the governance and administration of dioceses, although some function in the various Christian denominations and traditions as auxiliaries, apostolic administrators, and as titular bishops.

The role or office of the bishop is called episcopacy or the episcopate. Organisationally, several Christian denominations utilise ecclesiastical structures that call for the position of bishops, while other denominations have dispensed with this office, seeing it as a symbol of power. Bishops have also exercised political authority within their dioceses. Historically, Manichaeism also employed a similar office within their church, having a fixed number of 72 bishops.

Traditionally, bishops claim to be within apostolic succession and the historic episcopacy, a direct historical lineage dating back to the original Twelve Apostles, Saint Paul, or one of the Seventy. The bishops are by doctrine understood as those who possess the full priesthood given by Jesus Christ, and therefore may ordain other clergy, including other bishops. A person ordained as a deacon, priest (i.e. presbyter), and then bishop is understood to hold the fullness of the ministerial priesthood, given responsibility by Christ to govern, teach and sanctify the Body of Christ (the Christian Church). Priests, deacons and lay ministers co-operate and assist their bishops in pastoral ministry.

Some Pentecostal and other Protestant denominations have bishops who oversee congregations, though they do not necessarily claim apostolic succession, with exception to those Pentecostals and Charismatics affiliated to churches founded by J. Delano Ellis and Paul S. Morton.

== Etymology and terminology ==
The English word bishop derives, via Latin episcopus, Old English biscop, and Middle English bisshop, from the Greek word ἐπίσκοπος, epískopos, meaning "overseer" or "supervisor". Greek was the language of the early Christian church, but the term epískopos did not originate in Christianity: it had been used in Greek for several centuries before the advent of Christianity.

The English words priest and presbyter both derive, via Latin, from the Greek word πρεσβύτερος, presbýteros, meaning "elder" or "senior", and not originally referring to priesthood.

In the early Christian era the two terms were not always clearly distinguished, but epískopos is used in the sense of the order or office of bishop, distinct from that of presbýteros, in the writings attributed to Ignatius of Antioch in the second century.

== Christian episcopal development ==
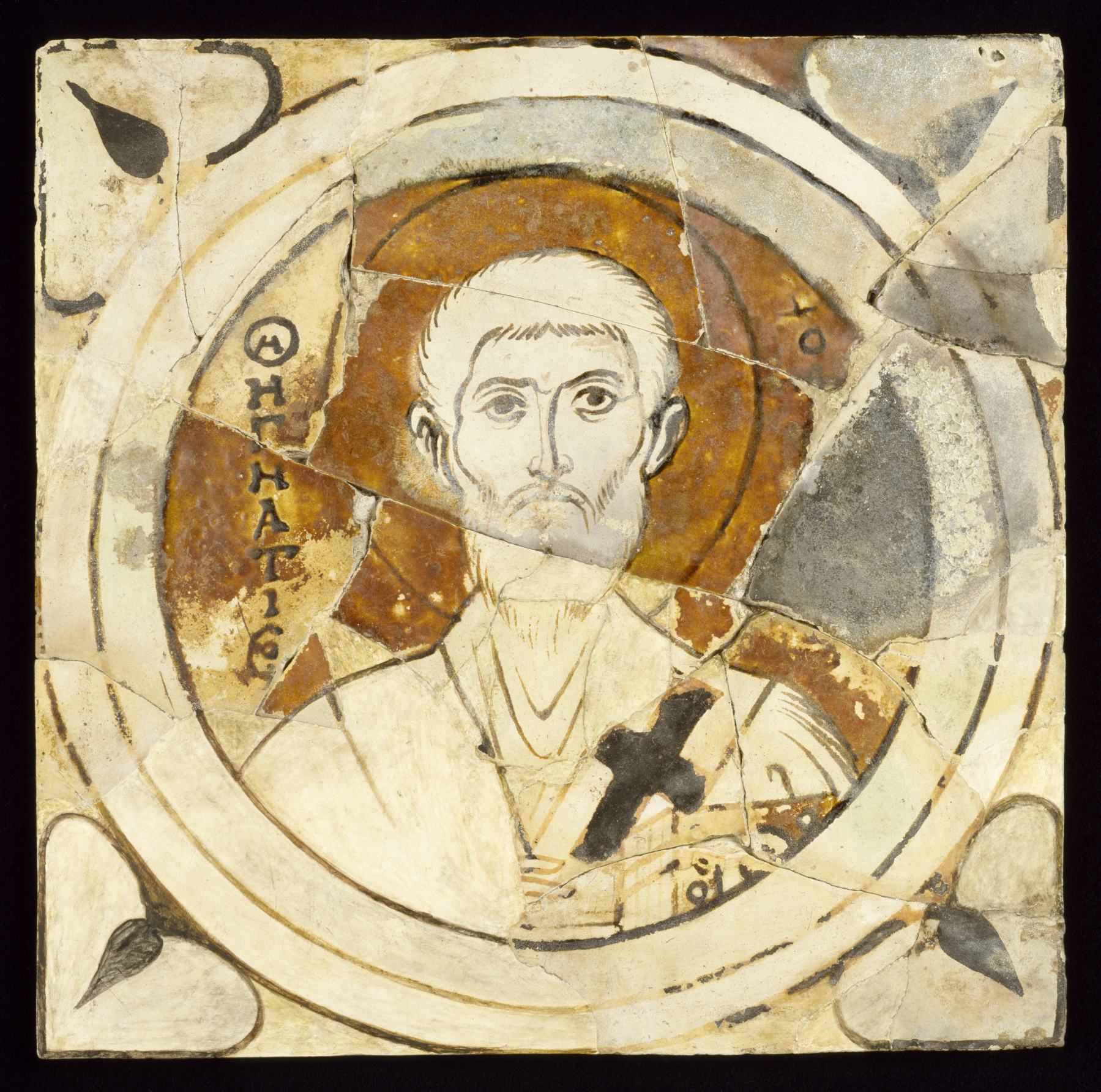
Ignatius, bishop of Antioch, student of John the Apostle

According to most scholars, the earliest organization of the Christian church in Jerusalem was similar to that of Jewish synagogues, but it had a council or college of ordained presbyters (πρεσβύτεροι, elders). In Acts 11:30 and Acts 15:22, a collegiate system of government in Jerusalem is chaired by James the Just, according to tradition the first bishop of the city. In Acts 14:23, the Apostle Paul ordains presbyters for churches in Anatolia. The word presbyter was not yet distinguished from overseer (ἐπίσκοπος, episkopos, later used exclusively to mean bishop), as in Acts 20:17 and 20:28, Titus 1:5–7 and 1 Peter 5:1. (Note: "It seems that at first the terms 'episcopos' and 'presbyter' were used interchangeably ...") (Note: "The general consensus among scholars has been that, at the turn of the first and second centuries, local congregations were led by bishops and presbyters whose offices were overlapping or indistinguishable.") The earliest writings of the Apostolic Fathers, the Didache and the First Epistle of Clement, for example, show the church used two terms for local church offices—presbyters (seen by many as an interchangeable term with episkopos or overseer) and deacon.

In the First Epistle to Timothy and Epistle to Titus in the New Testament a more clearly defined episcopate can be seen. Both letters state that Paul had left Timothy in Ephesus and Titus in Crete to oversee the local church. Paul commands Titus to ordain presbyters/bishops and to exercise general oversight. John Zizioulas argues that "The task of the Bishop was from the beginning principally liturgical, consisting in the offering of the Divine Eucharist." The authorship of both those letters is questioned by many scholars in the field and the question whether they reflect a first or second century structure of church hierarchy is among the arguments used in the debate as to their authenticity.

Early sources are unclear but various groups of Christian communities may have had the bishop surrounded by a group or college functioning as leaders of the local churches. Eventually the head or "monarchic" bishop came to rule more clearly, and all local churches would eventually follow the example of the other churches and structure themselves after the model of the others with the one bishop in clearer charge, though the role of the body of presbyters remained important.

=== Apostolic Fathers ===
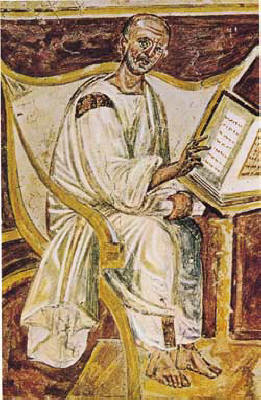
A 6th-century image of Saint Augustine, bishop of Hippo Regius

Around the end of the 1st century, the early church's organization became clearer in historical documents. In the works of the Apostolic Fathers, and Ignatius of Antioch in particular, the role of the episkopos, or bishop, became more important, or became more clearly defined. Other contemporary Christian writers do not describe monarchial bishops, either continuing to equate them with the presbyters or speaking of episkopoi (bishops, plural) in a city.

Clement of Alexandria (end of the 2nd century) writes about the ordination of a certain Zachæus as bishop by the imposition of Simon Peter Bar-Jonah's hands. The words bishop and ordination are used in their technical meaning by the same Clement of Alexandria. The bishops in the 2nd century are defined also as the only clergy to whom the ordination to priesthood (presbyterate) and diaconate is entrusted: "a priest (presbyter) lays on hands, but does not ordain." (cheirothetei ou cheirotonei).

At the beginning of the 3rd century, Hippolytus of Rome describes another feature of the ministry of a bishop, which is that of the "Spiritum primatus sacerdotii habere potestatem dimittere peccata": the primate of sacrificial priesthood and the power to forgive sins.

=== Canonical age ===
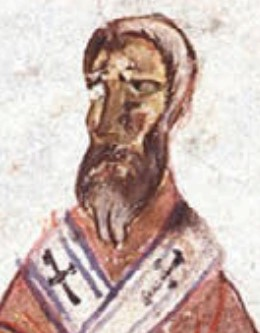
Patriarch Stephen I of Constantinople was ordained (consecrated) as bishop at the age of 19

As the bishop's role further developed into the 4th century, the First Council of Nicaea decreed that bishops should be ordained by at least three others. Age requirements for episcopal ordination or consecration were neither universal nor fixed in early Christian churches. It was, however, universally required that a bishop be male; and lacking a definitive ecumenical age requirement for holy orders—between the early ecumenical councils of the Great and imperial Roman churches, and after schism into the Latin and Greek churches—young men had been ordained, appointed, and/or enthroned as bishops, archbishops, patriarchs and cardinals, some as young as 5.

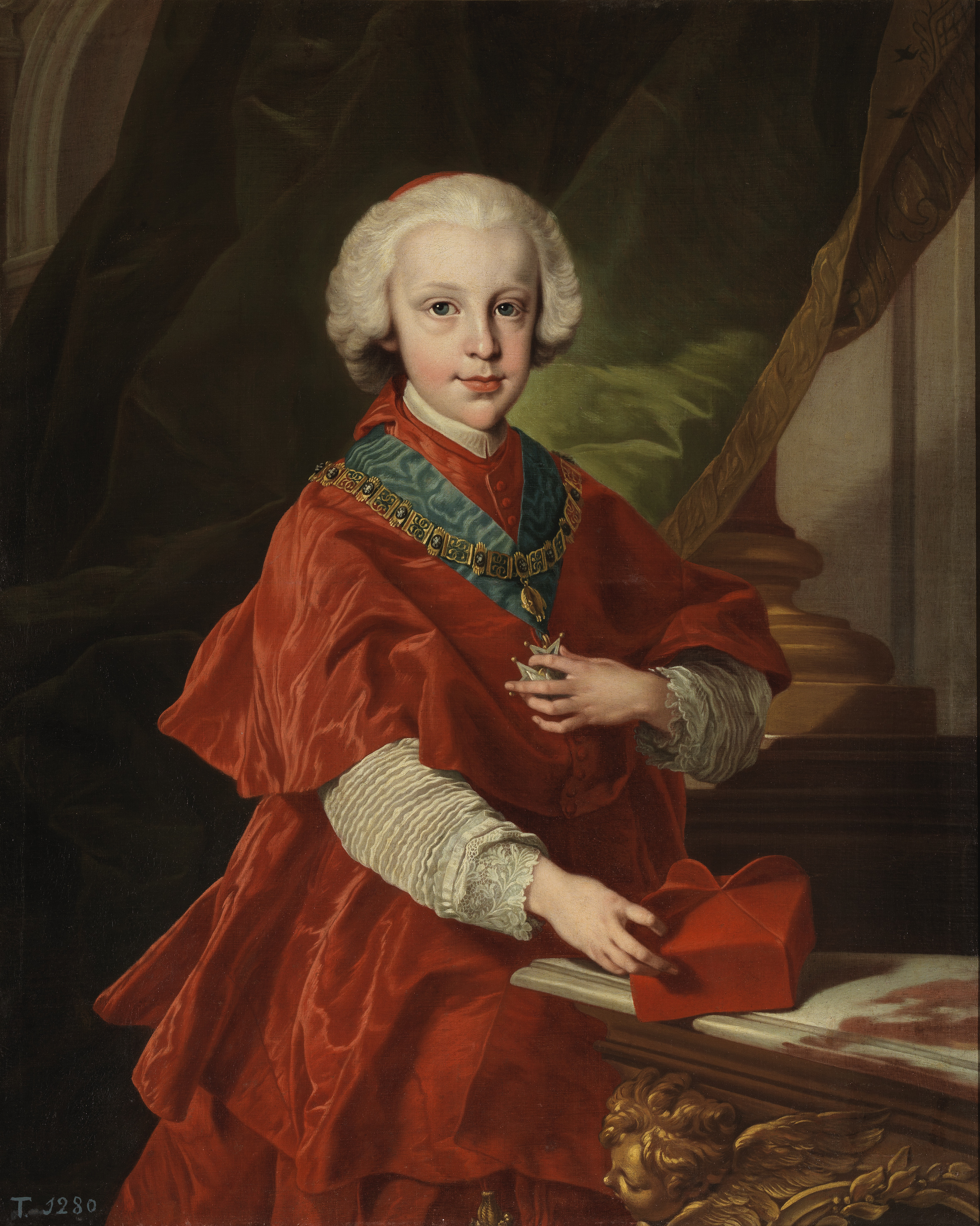
Luis Antonio Jaime de Borbón y Farnesio, as cardinal at age 8

Some notable younger Latin and Greek bishops (from ages 5 to 29) have included: Hugh Vermandois (5); Luis Antonio Jaime de Borbón y Farnesio (8); Guido Ascanio Sforza di Santa Fiora (9); Benedict IX (between 11 and 20); Karol Ferdynand Vasa (11); Alexander Stewart (11); Charles Joseph of Lorraine (12); Niccolò Caetani (13); Bruno von Bayern (14); Odo of Bayeux (14); Alessandro Farnese (14); Cesare Borgia (15); Clemens August (15); Ranuccio Farnese (16); Alfonso Carafa (16); James II of Cyprus (16) Theophylact (16); Ippolito de' Medici (17); Cyril V Zaim (18); Diomede Carafa (19); Stephen I (19); Luis de Milà y de Borja (21); Nicolas de Besse (21); Clemente Grosso della Rovere (21); Luis María de Borbón y Vallabriga (22); Niccolò Gaddi (22); Juan de Borja Lanzol de Romaní, el menor (24); Gabriele Condulmer (later Eugene IV, aged 24) of Rome; Dositheus II (then metropolitan of Caesarea, aged 25 and later Greek patriarch of Jerusalem, aged 28); Alfonso Carrillo de Acuña (25); Ludovico Ludovisi (25); Giovanni Michiel (25); Charles Borromeo (25); Pedro González de Mendoza (26); Pietro Riario (26); Mark Sittich von Hohenems Altemps (26); Jošt Rožmberk (26); Giuliano della Rovere (later Julius II, aged 27); Bonifazio Bevilacqua Aldobrandini (27); Francesco Condulmer (27); Philipp Ludwig von Sinzendorf (27); Pedro Luis de Borja Lanzol de Romaní (27); Alessandro Riario (28); Gerhard II Lippe (29); and Sebastião da Silveira Cintra (29).

Throughout the Church of the East, other notable younger bishops (from ages 12 to 22) have included: Shimun XXIII Eshai (12); Shimun XIX Benyamin (16); Yohannan VIII Hormizd (16); Sargis Yosip (17); Shimun XVII Abraham (20); and Yosip Khnaninsho (22). Among the Oriental Orthodox, Grigor III Pahlavuni (born 1093) became catholicos of the Armenian Apostolic Church between the ages of 19 and 20 (1113/4); Mathews Athanasius (born 1818) became the Malankara Metropolitan around 23 years of age; and Geevarghese Mar Gregorios of Parumala (born 1848)—one of Joseph Rene Vilatte's co-consecrators—became a metropolitan bishop at age 28 (1876).

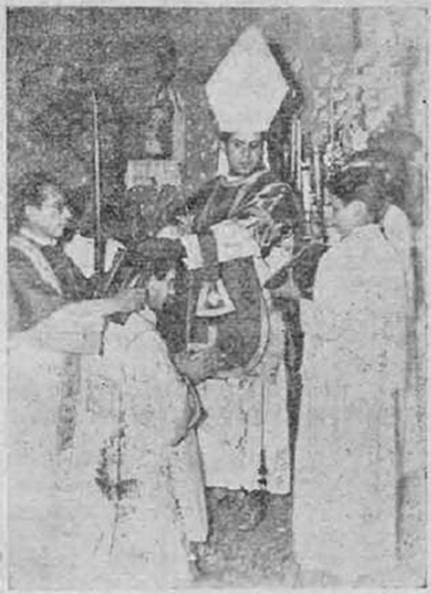
Luis Fernando Castillo Mendez's elevation at age 25

During the Catholic Church's Council of Trent in the 16th century, the Holy See dogmatically mandated a minimum canonical age of 30 for the episcopacy. The Eastern Orthodox Church would also impose a minimum age of 30 for the priesthood. The Coptic Orthodox have adopted a minimum canonical age of at least 28 for the priesthood, including its specialized ministries leading to the chorepiscopacy. For the office of bishop, the Eastern Orthodox Church imposed a minimum canonical age of 35. Overall, the Oriental Orthodox Churches, the Assyrian Church of the East and Protestantism have not established a universal, canonical age for elevation into the episcopacy.

During the 20th century, the Independent Catholic Carlos Duarte Costa consecrated Luis Fernando Castillo Mendez at the age of 25. He also consecrated Orlando Arcye Moya at the age of 29; and another bishop descending from Costa's historical episcopate was consecrated at the age of 22. Within the Holiness-Pentecostal tradition during the same century, bishops within the Church of God in Christ elevated Clarence Leslie Morton Jr. (born 1942) into the episcopacy at the age of 20 in 1962. J. Delano Ellis (born 1944), co-founder of the Joint College of African-American Pentecostal Bishops, was also elevated as bishop at the age of 26 in 1970 by a bishop within the United Holy Church of America.

In 2026, Leon Scoggins was consecrated as a bishop prior to the age of 35 within Pilgrim Assemblies International—a Pentecostal denomination founded by Roy E. Brown, another co-founder of the Joint College of African-American Pentecostal Bishops; during this episcopal elevation, concelebrants justified this consecration citing contrasts between Roman Catholic canon law and the Bible.

== Christian bishops and civil government ==
The efficient organization of the Roman Empire became the template for the organisation of the Great Church in the 4th century, particularly after Constantine's Edict of Milan. As the church moved from the shadows of privacy into the public forum it acquired land for churches, burials and clergy. In 391, Theodosius I decreed that any land that had been confiscated from the church by Roman authorities be returned.

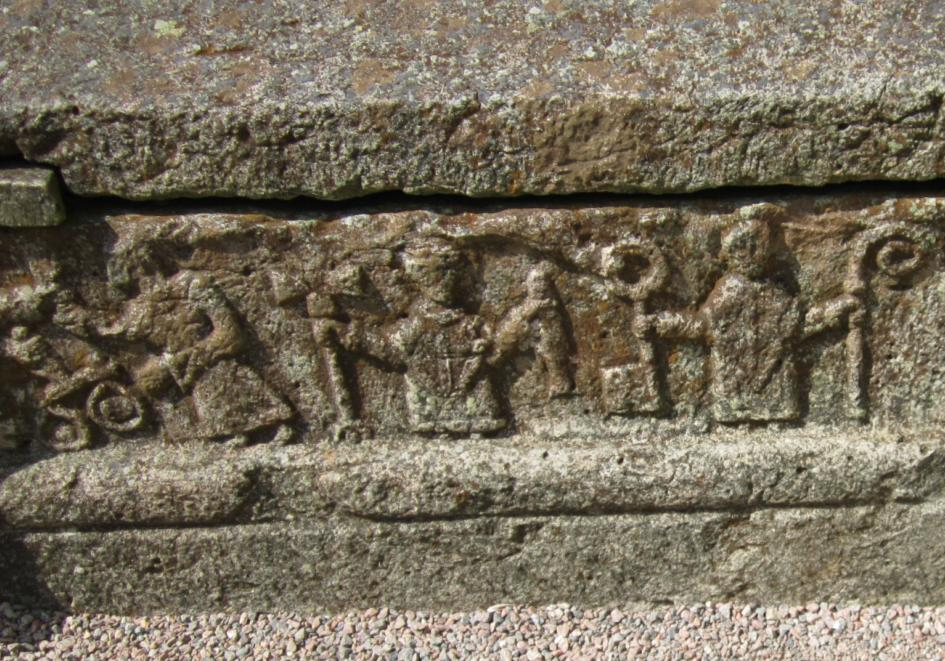
A bishop with other officials on an 11th-century grave in Sweden

The most usual term for the geographic area of a bishop's authority and ministry, the diocese, began as part of the structure of the Roman Empire under Diocletian. As Roman authority began to fail in the western portion of the empire, the church took over much of the civil administration. This can be clearly seen in the ministry of two popes: Pope Leo I in the 5th century, and Pope Gregory I in the 6th century. Both of these men were statesmen and public administrators in addition to their role as Christian pastors, teachers and leaders. In the Eastern churches, latifundia entailed to a bishop's see were much less common, the state power did not collapse the way it did in the West, and thus the tendency of bishops acquiring civil power was much weaker than in the West. However, the role of Western bishops as civil authorities, often called prince bishops, continued throughout much of the Middle Ages.

=== Bishops holding political office ===
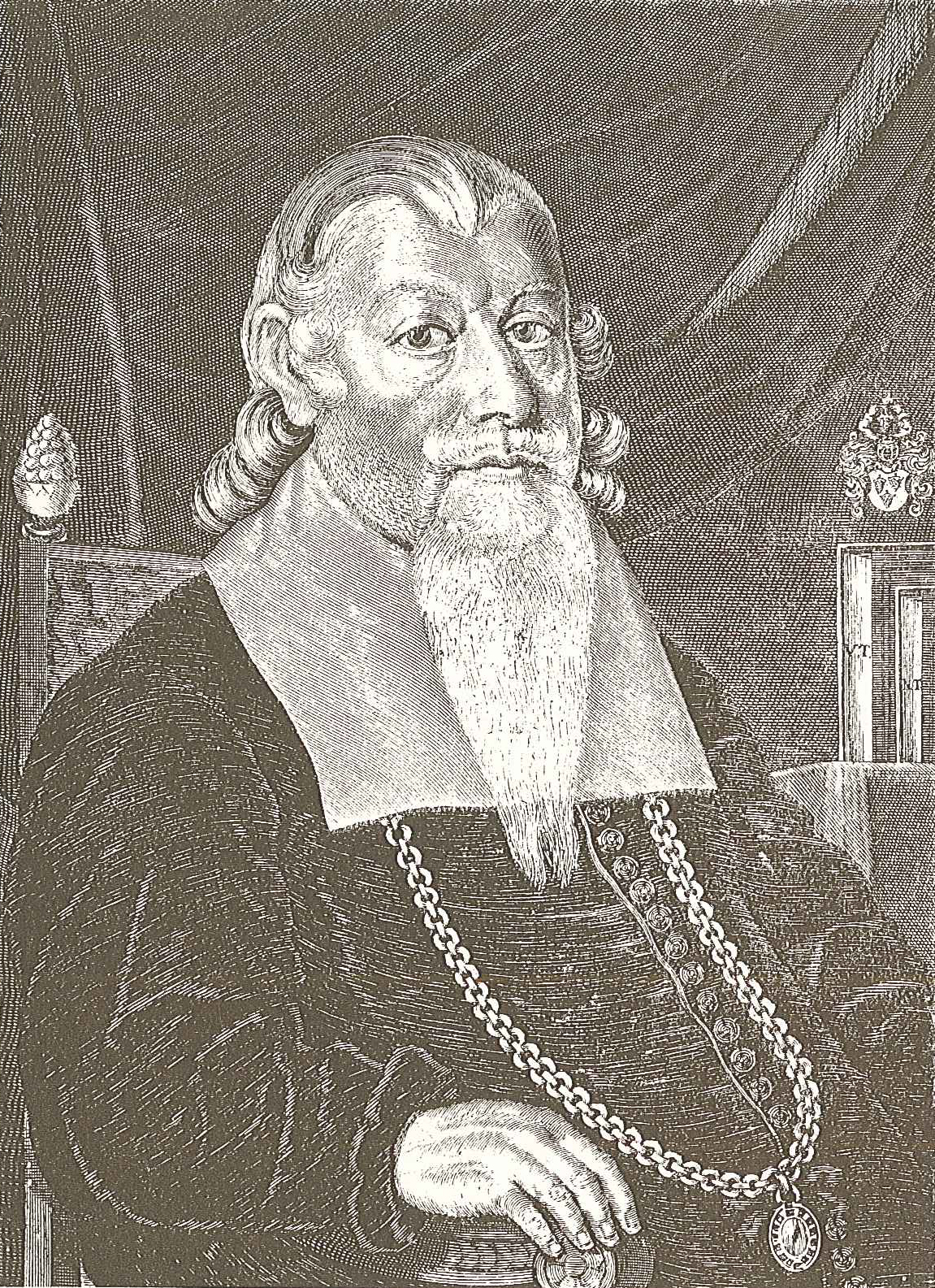
Peder Winstrup, a Danish bishop

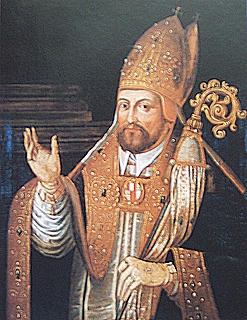
Johann Otto von Gemmingen, Prince-Bishop of Augsburg

As well as being archchancellors of the Holy Roman Empire after the 9th century, bishops generally served as chancellors to medieval monarchs, acting as head of the justiciary and chief chaplain. The Lord Chancellor of England was almost always a bishop up until the dismissal of Cardinal Thomas Wolsey by Henry VIII. Similarly, the position of Kanclerz in the Polish kingdom was always held by a bishop until the 16th century.

In modern times, the principality of Andorra is headed by Co-Princes of Andorra, one of whom is the Bishop of Urgell and the other, the sitting President of France, an arrangement that began with the Paréage of Andorra (1278), and was ratified in the 1993 constitution of Andorra.

The office of the Papacy is inherently held by the sitting Roman Catholic Bishop of Rome. Though not originally intended to hold temporal authority, since the Middle Ages the power of the Roman papacy gradually expanded deep into the secular realm and for centuries the sitting Bishop of Rome was the most powerful governmental office in Central Italy. In modern times, the Pope of Rome is also the sovereign Prince of Vatican City, an internationally recognized micro-state located entirely within the city of Rome.

In France, prior to the Revolution, representatives of the clergy—in practice, bishops and abbots of the largest monasteries—comprised the First Estate of the Estates-General. This role was abolished after separation of church and state was implemented during the French Revolution.

In the 21st century, the more senior bishops of the Church of England continue to sit in the House of Lords of the Parliament of the United Kingdom, as representatives of the established church, and are known as Lords Spiritual. The Bishop of Sodor and Man, whose diocese lies outside the United Kingdom, is an ex officio member of the Legislative Council of the Isle of Man. In the past, the Bishop of Durham had extensive vice-regal powers within his northern diocese, which was a county palatine, the County Palatine of Durham, (previously, Liberty of Durham) of which he was ex officio the earl. In the 19th century, a gradual process of reform was enacted, with the majority of the bishop's historic powers vested in The Crown by 1858.

Eastern Orthodox bishops, along with all other members of the clergy, are canonically forbidden to hold political office. Occasional exceptions to this rule are tolerated when the alternative is political chaos. In the Ottoman Empire, the Patriarch of Constantinople, for example, had de facto administrative, cultural and legal jurisdiction, as well as spiritual authority, over all Eastern Orthodox Christians of the empire, as part of the Ottoman millet system. An Eastern Orthodox bishop headed the Prince-Bishopric of Montenegro from 1516 to 1852, assisted by a secular guvernadur. More recently, Archbishop Makarios III of Cyprus, served as President of the Cyprus from 1960 to 1977, an extremely turbulent time period on the island.

In 2001, Peter Hollingworth, AC, OBE—then the Anglican Archbishop of Brisbane—was controversially appointed Governor-General of Australia. Although Hollingworth gave up his episcopal position to accept the appointment, it still attracted considerable opposition in a country which maintains a formal separation between Church and State.

=== Episcopacy during the English Civil War ===
During the period of the English Civil War, the role of bishops as wielders of political power and as upholders of the established church became a matter of heated political controversy. Presbyterianism was the polity of most Reformed Christianity in Europe, and had been favored by many in England since the English Reformation. It was commonly claimed by proponents of the system that the primitive Church the offices of presbyter and episkopos were not clearly distinguished, many Puritans held that this was the only form of government the church should have. The Anglican divine, Richard Hooker, objected to this claim in his famous work Of the Laws of Ecclesiastic Polity while, at the same time, defending Presbyterian ordination as valid (in particular Calvin's ordination of Beza). This was the official stance of the English Church until the Commonwealth, during which time, the views of Presbyterians and Independents (Congregationalists) were more freely expressed and practiced.

== Christian churches ==
=== Catholic, Eastern and Oriental Orthodox, Lutheran and Anglican churches ===
A mitre is used as a symbol of the bishop's ministry in Western Christianity.

One form for the coat of arms of a Catholic bishop

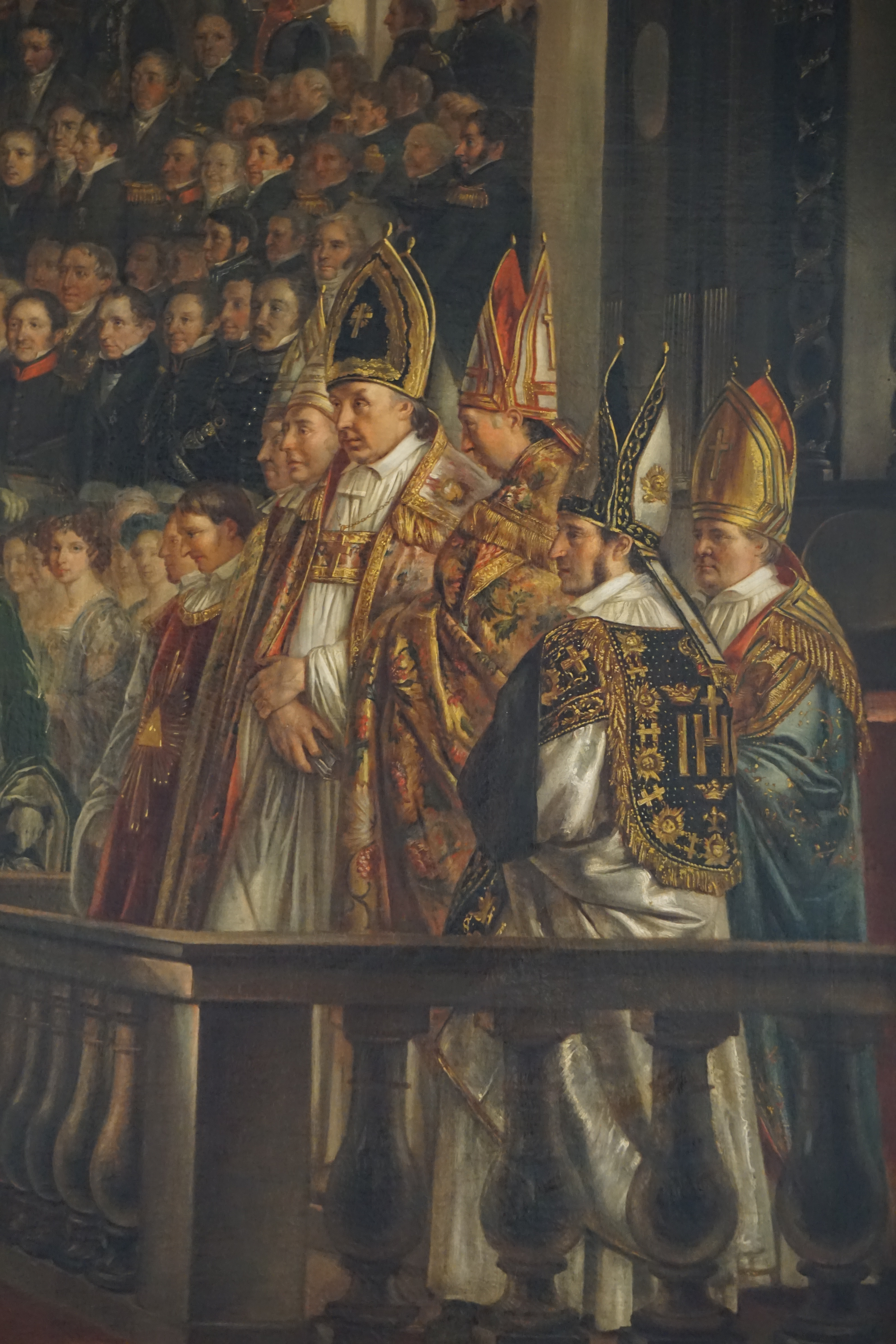
Karl XIV Johans kröning by Per Krafft the Younger (1818) depicting Evangelical-Lutheran bishops and priests in vestments during the coronation of Charles XIV John in Stockholm Cathedral

Bishops exercise leadership roles in the Catholic Church, the Eastern Orthodox Church, the Oriental Orthodox Churches, certain Evangelical-Lutheran churches, the Anglican Communion, the Independent Catholic churches, the Independent Anglican churches, and certain other, smaller, denominations.

The traditional role of a bishop is as pastor of a diocese (also called a bishopric, synod, eparchy or see), and so to serve as a "diocesan bishop", or "eparch" as it is called in many Eastern Christian churches. Dioceses vary considerably in size, geographically and population-wise. Some dioceses around the Mediterranean Sea which were Christianised early are rather compact, whereas dioceses in areas of rapid modern growth in Christian commitment, as in some parts of Sub-Saharan Africa, South America and the Far East, are much larger and more populous.

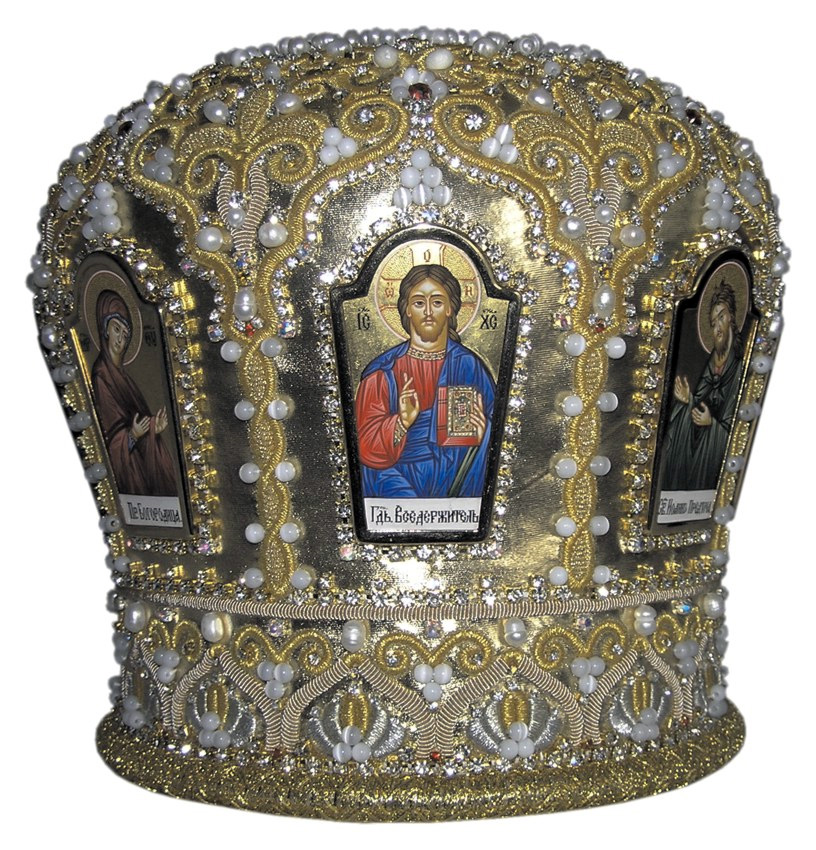
Mitre worn by an Eastern bishop with icons of Christ, the Theotokos (Mary, Mother of God) and Forerunner (John the Baptist)

As well as traditional diocesan bishops, many churches have a well-developed structure of church leadership that involves a number of layers of authority and responsibility:

Archbishop
An archbishop is the bishop of an archdiocese. This is usually a prestigious diocese with an important place in local church history. In the Catholic Church, the title is purely honorific and carries no extra jurisdiction, though most archbishops are also metropolitan bishops, as above, and are always awarded a pallium. In most provinces of the Anglican Communion, however, an archbishop has metropolitical and primatial power.
Area bishop
Some Anglican suffragans are given the responsibility for a geographical area within the diocese (for example, the Bishop of Stepney is an area bishop within the Diocese of London).
Assistant bishop
Honorary assistant bishop, assisting bishop, or bishop emeritus: these titles are usually applied to retired bishops who are given a general licence to minister as episcopal pastors under a diocesan's oversight. The titles, in this meaning, are not used by the Catholic Church.
Auxiliary bishop
An auxiliary bishop is a full-time assistant to a diocesan bishop (the Catholic and Eastern Orthodox equivalent of an Anglican suffragan bishop). An auxiliary bishop is a titular bishop, and he is to be appointed as a vicar general or at least as an episcopal vicar of the diocese in which he serves.
Catholicos
Catholicoi are the heads of some of the Eastern Orthodox, Oriental Orthodox, and Eastern Rite Catholic sui iuris churches (notably the Armenian), roughly similar to a Patriarch.
Chorbishop
A chorbishop is an official of a diocese in some Eastern Christian churches. Chorbishops are not generally ordained bishops – they are not given the sacrament of Holy Orders in that degree – but function as assistants to the diocesan bishop with certain honorary privileges.
Coadjutor bishop
A coadjutor bishop is an auxiliary bishop who is given almost equal authority in a diocese with the diocesan bishop, and the automatic right to succeed the incumbent diocesan bishop. The appointment of coadjutors is often seen as a means of providing for continuity of church leadership.
General bishop
A title and role in some churches, not associated with a diocese. In the Coptic Orthodox Church the episcopal ranks from highest to lowest are metropolitan archbishops, metropolitan bishops, diocesan bishops, bishops exarchs of the throne, suffragan bishops, auxiliary bishops, general bishops, and finally chorbishops. Bishops of the same category rank according to date of consecration.
Major archbishop
Major archbishops are the heads of some of the Eastern Catholic Churches. Their authority within their sui juris church is equal to that of a patriarch, but they receive fewer ceremonial honors.
Metropolitan bishop
A metropolitan bishop is an archbishop in charge of an ecclesiastical province, or group of dioceses, and in addition to having immediate jurisdiction over his own archdiocese, also exercises some oversight over the other dioceses within that province. Sometimes a metropolitan may also be the head of an autocephalous, sui iuris, or autonomous church when the number of adherents of that tradition are small. In the Latin Church, metropolitans are always archbishops; in many Eastern churches, the title is "metropolitan", with some of these churches using "archbishop" as a separate office.
Patriarch
Patriarchs are the bishops who head certain ancient autocephalous or sui iuris churches, which are a collection of metropolitan sees or provinces. After the First Ecumenical Council at Nicea, the church structure was patterned after the administrative divisions of the Roman Empire wherein a metropolitan or bishop of a metropolis came to be the ecclesiastical head of a civil capital of a province or a metropolis. Whereas, the bishop of the larger administrative district, diocese, came to be called an exarch. In a few cases, a bishop came to preside over a number of dioceses, i.e., Rome, Antioch, and Alexandria. At the Fourth Ecumenical Council at Chalcedon in 451, Constantinople was given jurisdiction over three dioceses for the reason that the city was "the residence of the emperor and senate". Additionally, Jerusalem was recognized at the Council of Chalcedon as one of the major sees. In 692, the Quinisext Council formally recognized and ranked the sees of the Pentarchy in order of preeminence, at that time Rome, Constantinople, Alexandria, Antioch, and Jerusalem. In the Catholic Church, Patriarchs sometimes call their leaders Catholicos; the Patriarch of the Coptic Orthodox Church of Alexandria, Egypt, is called Pope, meaning 'Father'. While most patriarchs in the Eastern Catholic Churches have jurisdiction over a particular church sui iuris, all Latin Church patriarchs, except for the Pope, have only honorary titles. In 2006, Pope Benedict XVI gave up the title of Patriarch of the West. The first recorded use of the title by a Roman Pope was by Theodore I in 620. However, early church documents, such as those of the First Council of Nicaea (325) had always listed the Pope of Rome first among the Ancient Patriarchs (first three, and later five: Rome, Constantinople, Alexandria, Antioch and Jerusalem—collectively referred to as the Pentarchy). Later, the heads of various national churches became Patriarchs, but they are ranked below the Pentarchy.
Te Pīhopa
The Anglican Church in Aotearoa, New Zealand and Polynesia uses — even in English language usage — this Māori language term for its tikanga Māori bishops.
Primate
A primate is usually the bishop of the oldest church of a nation. Sometimes this carries jurisdiction over metropolitan bishops, but usually it is purely honorific. The primate of the Scottish Episcopal Church is chosen from among the diocesan bishops, and, while retaining diocesan responsibility, is called Primus.
Presiding bishop or president bishop
These titles are often used for the head of a national Anglican church, but the title is not usually associated with a particular episcopal see like the title of a primate.
Suffragan bishop
A suffragan bishop is a bishop subordinate to a metropolitan. In the Catholic Church this term is applied to all non-metropolitan bishops (that is, diocesan bishops of dioceses within a metropolitan's province, and auxiliary bishops). In the Anglican Communion, the term applies to a bishop who is a full-time assistant to a diocesan bishop: the Bishop of Warwick is suffragan to the Bishop of Coventry (the diocesan), though both live in Coventry.
Supreme bishop
The obispo maximo, or supreme bishop, of the Philippine Independent Church is elected by the General Assembly of the church. He is the chief executive officer of the church. He also holds an important pastoral role, being the spiritual head and chief pastor of the church. He has precedence of honor and prominence of position among, and recognized to have primacy, over other bishops.
Titular bishop
A titular bishop is a bishop without a diocese. Rather, the bishop is head of a titular see, which is usually an ancient city that used to have a bishop, but, for some reason or other, does not have one now. Titular bishops often serve as auxiliary bishops. In the Ecumenical Patriarchate, bishops of modern dioceses are often given a titular see alongside their modern one (for example, the archbishop of Thyateira and Great Britain).

==== Duties ====
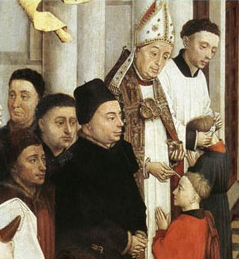
A bishop administering Confirmation. Rogier van der Weyden, The Seven Sacraments, 15th century. In the Latin Church of the Catholic Church the administration of Confirmation is normally reserved to the local bishop.

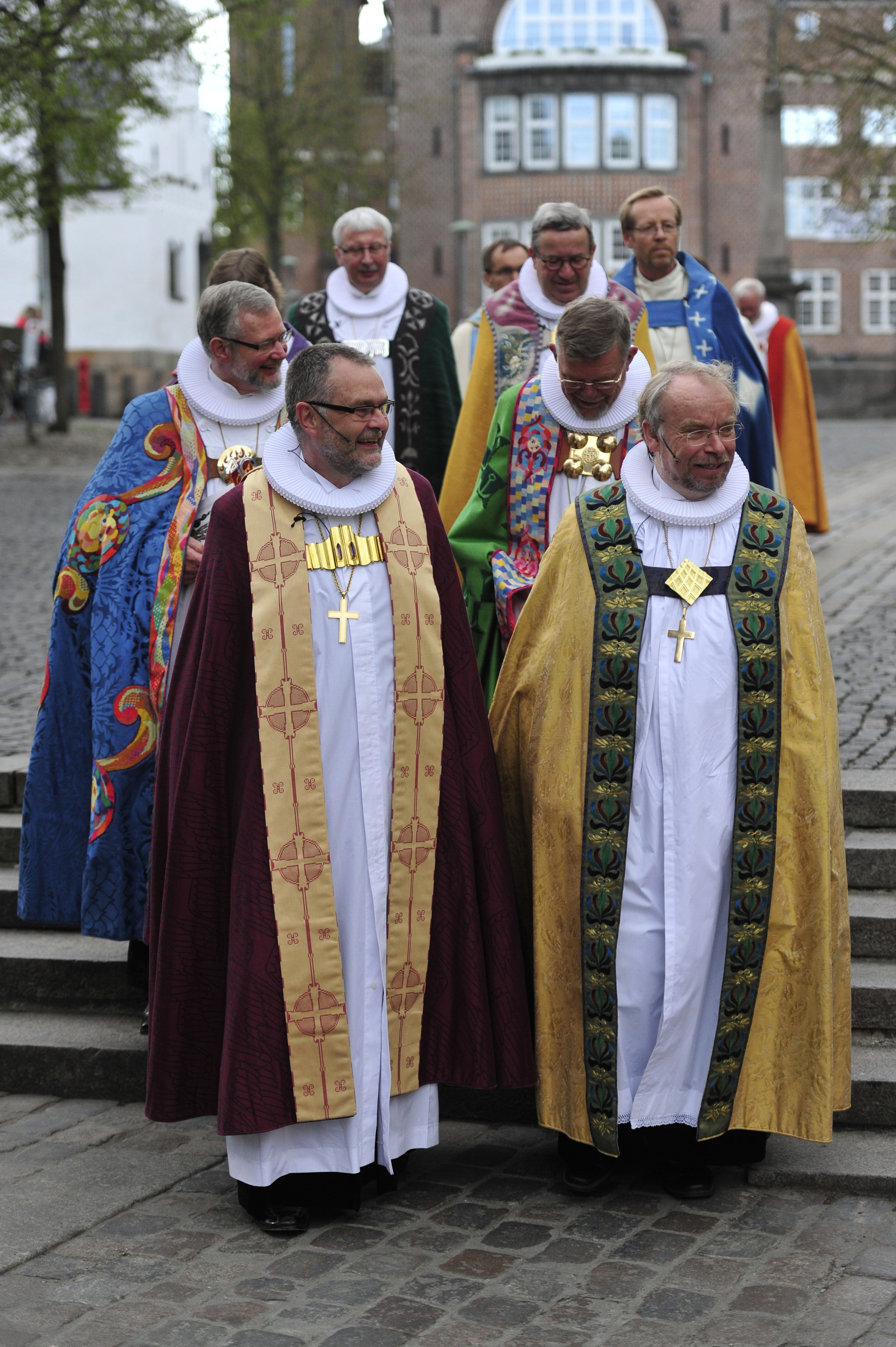
Danish Lutheran bishops wearing a cope over cassock, surplice, ruff and pectoral cross

In Catholicism, Eastern Orthodoxy, Oriental Orthodoxy, High Church Lutheranism, and Anglicanism, only a bishop can ordain other bishops, priests, and deacons.

The bishop is the ordinary minister of the sacrament of confirmation in the Latin Church, and in the Old Catholic communion only a bishop may administer this sacrament. In the Lutheran and Anglican churches, the bishop normatively administers the rite of confirmation, although in those denominations that do not have an episcopal polity, confirmation is administered by the priest. However, in the Byzantine and other Eastern rites, whether Eastern or Oriental Orthodox or Eastern Catholic, chrismation is done immediately after baptism, and thus the priest is the one who confirms, using chrism blessed by a bishop.

==== Ordination of bishops ====
Bishops in all of these communions are ordained or consecrated by other bishops through the laying on of hands. Ordination of a bishop, and thus continuation of apostolic succession, takes place through a ritual centred on the imposition of hands and prayer.

In Scandinavia and the Baltic region, Lutheran churches participating in the Porvoo Communion (those of Iceland, Norway, Sweden, Finland, Estonia, and Lithuania), as well as many non-Porvoo membership Lutheran churches (including those of Kenya, Latvia, and Russia), as well as the confessional Communion of Nordic Lutheran Dioceses, believe that they ordain their bishops in the apostolic succession in lines stemming from the original apostles. The New Westminster Dictionary of Church History states that "In Sweden the apostolic succession was preserved because the Catholic bishops were allowed to stay in office, but they had to approve changes in the ceremonies."

While traditional teaching maintains that any bishop with apostolic succession can validly perform the ordination of another bishop, some churches require two or three bishops participate, either to ensure sacramental validity or to conform with church law.

===== Peculiar to the Catholic Church =====
Catholic doctrine holds that one bishop can validly ordain another (priest) as a bishop. Although a minimum of three bishops participating is desirable (there are usually several more) in order to demonstrate collegiality, canonically only one bishop is necessary. The Second Vatican Council's Constitution on the Sacred Liturgy stated that "when a bishop is consecrated, the laying of hands may be done by all the bishops present".

Apart from the ordination, which is always done by other bishops, there are different methods as to the actual selection of a candidate for ordination as bishop. The Dicastery for Bishops generally oversees the selection of new bishops, with recommendations sent for the approval of the pope. The papal nuncio usually solicits names from the bishops of a country, consults with priests and leading members of a laity, and then selects three to be forwarded to the Holy See. In Europe, some cathedral chapters have duties to elect bishops. The Eastern Catholic churches generally elect their own bishops. Most Eastern Orthodox churches allow varying amounts of formalised laity or lower clergy influence on the choice of bishops. This also applies in those Eastern churches which are in union with the pope, though it is required that he give assent.

The pope, in addition to being the Bishop of Rome and spiritual head of the Catholic Church, is also the Patriarch of the Latin Church. Each bishop within the Latin Church is answerable directly to the Pope and not any other bishop except to metropolitans in certain oversight instances. In this instance, the pope uses the title Patriarch of the West, although this title was dropped from use between 2006 and 2024, when Pope Francis reinstituted it.

===== Recognition of other churches' ordinations =====
The Catholic Church does recognise as valid (though illicit) ordinations done by breakaway Catholic, Old Catholic or Oriental bishops, and groups descended from them; it also regards as both valid and licit those ordinations done by bishops of the Eastern churches, (Note: Section 16 of the Second Vatican Council's Decree on Ecumenism, Unitatis Redintegratio states: "To remove, then, all shadow of doubt, this holy Council solemnly declares that the Churches of the East, while remembering the necessary unity of the whole Church, have the power to govern themselves according to the disciplines proper to them, since these are better suited to the character of their faithful, and more for the good of their souls.") so long as those receiving the ordination conform to other canonical requirements (for example, is an adult male) and an eastern orthodox rite of episcopal ordination, expressing the proper functions and sacramental status of a bishop, is used; this has given rise to the phenomenon of episcopi vagantes (for example, clergy of the Independent Catholic groups which claim apostolic succession, though this claim is rejected by both Catholicism and Eastern Orthodoxy). With respect to Lutheranism, "the Catholic Church has never officially expressed its judgement on the validity of orders as they have been handed down by episcopal succession in these two national Lutheran churches" (the Evangelical Lutheran Church of Sweden and the Evangelical Lutheran Church of Finland) though it does "question how the ecclesiastical break in the 16th century has affected the apostolicity of the churches of the Reformation and thus the apostolicity of their ministry".

Since Pope Leo XIII issued the bull Apostolicae curae in 1896, the Catholic Church has insisted that Anglican orders are invalid because of the Reformed changes in the Anglican ordination rites of the 16th century and divergence in understanding of the theology of priesthood, episcopacy and Eucharist. However, since the 1930s, Utrecht Old Catholic bishops (recognised by the Holy See as validly ordained) have sometimes taken part in the ordination of Anglican bishops. According to the writer Timothy Dufort, by 1969, all Church of England bishops had acquired Old Catholic lines of apostolic succession recognised by the Holy See. This development has been used to argue that the strain of apostolic succession has been re-introduced into Anglicanism, at least within the Church of England. However, other issues, such as the Anglican ordination of women, is at variance with Catholic understanding of Christian teaching, and have contributed to the reaffirmation of Catholic rejection of Anglican ordinations.

The Eastern Orthodox Church does not accept the validity of any ordinations performed by the Independent Catholic or Independent Orthodox groups, as Eastern Orthodoxy considers to be spurious any consecration outside the church as a whole. Eastern Orthodoxy considers apostolic succession to exist only within themselves as the one true church, and not through any authority held by individual bishops; thus, if a bishop ordains someone to serve outside the (Eastern Orthodox) Church, the ceremony is ineffectual, and no ordination has taken place regardless of the ritual used or the ordaining prelate's position within the Eastern Orthodox Church.

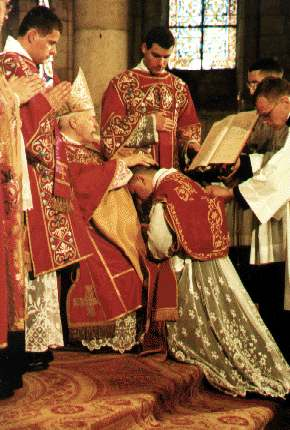
The consecrated bishop is the only minister of Holy Orders. Photo of pre-Vatican II ceremony.

The position of the Catholic Church is slightly different. Whilst it does recognise the validity of the orders of certain groups which separated from communion with Holy See (for instance, the ordinations of the Old Catholics in communion with Utrecht, as well as the Polish National Catholic Church, which received its orders directly from Utrecht, and was until recently part of that communion), Catholicism does not recognise the orders of any group whose teaching is at variance with what they consider the core tenets of Christianity; this is the case even though the clergy of the Independent Catholic groups may use the proper ordination ritual. There are also other reasons why the Holy See does not recognise the validity of the orders of the independent clergy:

- They hold that the continuing practice among many independent clergy of one person receiving multiple ordinations in order to secure apostolic succession, betrays an incorrect and mechanistic theology of ordination.
- They hold that the practice within independent groups of ordaining women (such as within certain member communities of the Anglican Communion) demonstrates an understanding of priesthood that they vindicate is totally unacceptable to the Catholic and Eastern Orthodox churches as they believe that the Universal Church does not possess such authority; thus, they uphold that any ceremonies performed by these women should be considered sacramentally invalid.
- The theology of male clergy within the Independent movement is also suspect according to the Catholics, as they presumably approve of the ordination of females, and may have even undergone an (invalid) ordination ceremony conducted by a woman.

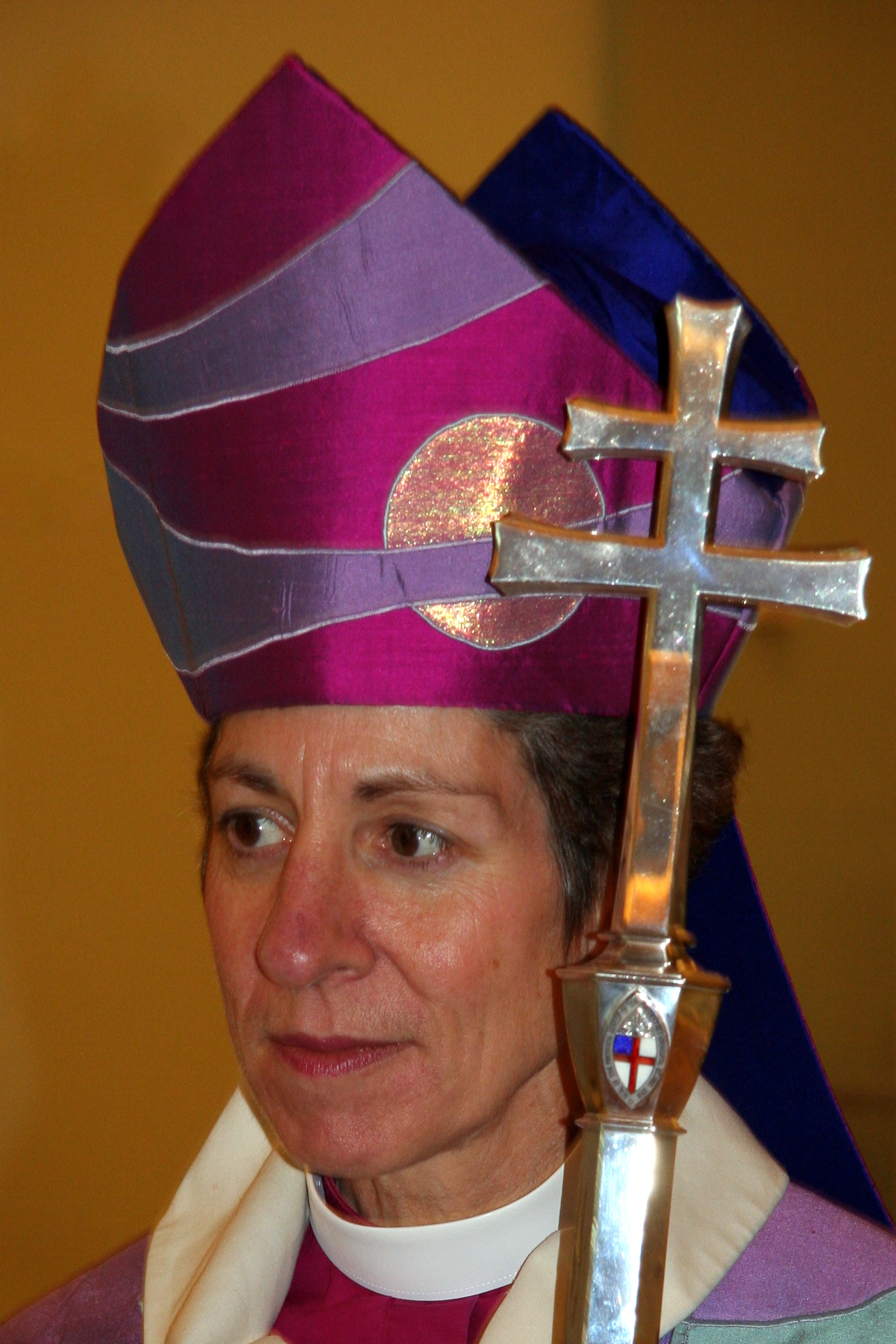
Katharine Jefferts Schori, the 26th presiding bishop of the Episcopal Church (United States)

Whilst members of the Independent Catholic movement take seriously the issue of valid orders, it is highly significant that the relevant Vatican Congregations tend not to respond to petitions from Independent Catholic bishops and clergy who seek to be received into communion with the Holy See, hoping to continue in some sacramental role. In those instances where the pope does grant reconciliation, those deemed to be clerics within the Independent Old Catholic movement are invariably admitted as laity and not priests or bishops.

There is a mutual recognition of the validity of orders amongst Catholic, Eastern Orthodox, Old Catholic, Oriental Orthodox and Assyrian Church of the East churches.

Some provinces of the Anglican Communion have begun ordaining women as bishops in recent decades—for example, England, Ireland, Scotland, Wales, the United States, Australia, New Zealand, Canada and Cuba. The first woman to be consecrated a bishop within Anglicanism was Barbara Harris, who was ordained in the United States in 1989. In 2006, Katharine Jefferts Schori, the Episcopal Bishop of Nevada, became the first woman to become the presiding bishop of the Episcopal Church.

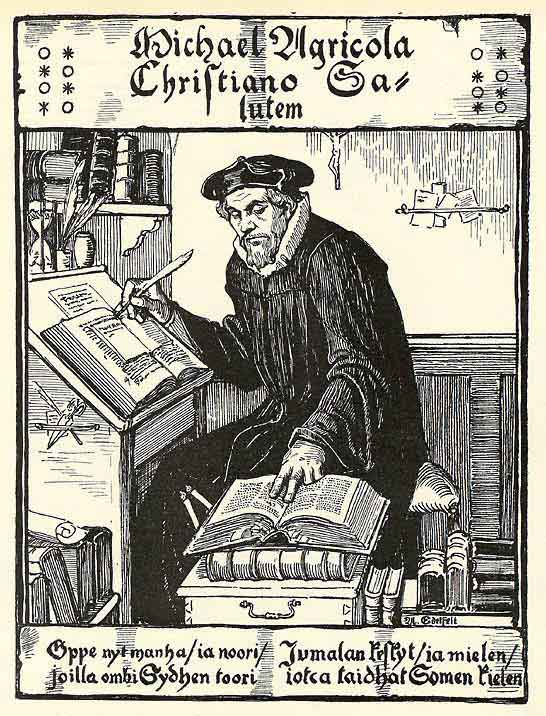
Mikael Agricola (1510–1557), a Finnish Lutheran clergyman and the Bishop of Turku

In the Evangelical Lutheran Church in America (ELCA) and the Evangelical Lutheran Church in Canada (ELCIC), the largest Lutheran church bodies in the United States and Canada, respectively, and roughly based on the Nordic Lutheran national churches (similar to that of the Church of England), bishops are elected by Synod Assemblies, consisting of both lay members and clergy, for a term of six years, which can be renewed, depending upon the local synod's "constitution" (which is mirrored on either the ELCA or ELCIC's national constitution). Since the implementation of concordats between the ELCA and the Episcopal Church of the United States and the ELCIC and the Anglican Church of Canada, all bishops, including the presiding bishop (ELCA) or the national bishop (ELCIC), have been consecrated using the historic succession in line with bishops from the Evangelical Lutheran Church of Sweden, with at least one Anglican bishop serving as co-consecrator.

Although ELCA agreed with the Episcopal Church to limit ordination to the bishop "ordinarily", ELCA pastor-ordinators are given permission to perform the rites in "extraordinary" circumstance. In practice, "extraordinary" circumstance have included disagreeing with Episcopalian views of the episcopate, and as a result, ELCA pastors ordained by other pastors are not permitted to be deployed to Episcopal Churches (they can, however, serve in Presbyterian Church USA, United Methodist Church, Reformed Church in America, and Moravian Church congregations, as the ELCA is in full communion with these denominations). The Lutheran Church–Missouri Synod (LCMS) and the Wisconsin Evangelical Lutheran Synod (WELS), the second and third largest Lutheran bodies in the United States and the two largest Confessional Lutheran bodies in North America, do not follow an episcopal form of governance, settling instead on a form of quasi-congregationalism patterned off what they believe to be the practice of the early church. The second largest of the three predecessor bodies of the ELCA, the American Lutheran Church, was a congregationalist body, with national and synod presidents before they were re-titled as bishops (borrowing from the Lutheran churches in Germany) in the 1980s. With regard to ecclesial discipline and oversight, national and synod presidents typically function similarly to bishops in episcopal bodies.

=== Methodism ===
==== African Methodist Episcopal Church ====
In the African Methodist Episcopal Church, "Bishops are the Chief Officers of the Connectional Organization. They are elected for life by a majority vote of the General Conference which meets every four years."

==== Christian Methodist Episcopal Church ====
In the Christian Methodist Episcopal Church in the United States, bishops are administrative superintendents of the church; they are elected by "delegate" votes for as many years deemed until the age of 74, then the bishop must retire. Among their duties, are responsibility for appointing clergy to serve local churches as pastor, for performing ordinations, and for safeguarding the doctrine and discipline of the church. The General Conference, a meeting every four years, has an equal number of clergy and lay delegates. In each Annual Conference, CME bishops serve for four-year terms. In 2010, Teresa E. Jefferson-Snorton was elected as a bishop, becoming the first woman to hold that position. As of 2024, she remains the only female bishop in CME.

==== United Methodist Church ====
United Methodist Episcopal Shield

In the United Methodist Church (the largest branch of Methodism in the world) bishops serve as administrative and pastoral superintendents of the church. They are elected for life from among the ordained elders (presbyters) by vote of the delegates in regional (called jurisdictional) conferences, and are consecrated by the other bishops present at the conference through the laying on of hands. In the United Methodist Church bishops remain members of the "Order of Elders" while being consecrated to the "Office of the Episcopacy". Within the United Methodist Church only bishops are empowered to consecrate bishops and ordain clergy. Among their most critical duties is the ordination and appointment of clergy to serve local churches as pastor, presiding at sessions of the Annual, Jurisdictional, and General Conferences, providing pastoral ministry for the clergy under their charge, and safeguarding the doctrine and discipline of the church. Furthermore, individual bishops, or the Council of Bishops as a whole, often serve a prophetic role, making statements on important social issues and setting forth a vision for the denomination, though they have no legislative authority of their own. In all of these areas, bishops of the United Methodist Church function very much in the historic meaning of the term. According to the Book of Discipline of the United Methodist Church, a bishop's responsibilities are:

Leadership.—Spiritual and Temporal—

1. To lead and oversee the spiritual and temporal affairs of The United Methodist Church, which confesses Jesus Christ as Lord and Savior, and particularly to lead the Church in its mission of witness and service in the world.
2. To travel through the connection at large as the Council of Bishops (¶ 526) to implement strategy for the concern of the Church.
3. To provide liaison and leadership in the quest for Christian unity in ministry, mission, and structure and in the search for strengthened relationships with other living faith communities.
4. To organize such Missions as shall have been authorized by the General Conference.
5. To promote and support the evangelistic vision of the whole Church.
6. To discharge such other duties as the Discipline may direct.

Presidential Duties.—1. To preside in the General, Jurisdictional, Central, and Annual Conferences. 2. To form the districts after consultation with the district superintendents and after the number of the same has been determined by vote of the Annual Conference. 3. To appoint the district superintendents annually (¶¶ 517–518). 4. To consecrate bishops, to ordain elders and deacons, to consecrate diaconal ministers, to commission deaconesses and home missionaries, and to see that the names of the persons commissioned and consecrated are entered on the journals of the conference and that proper credentials are furnished to these persons.

Working with Ministers.—1. To make and fix the appointments in the Annual Conferences, Provisional Annual Conferences, and Missions as the Discipline may direct (¶¶ 529–533).

2. To divide or to unite a circuit(s), stations(s), or mission(s) as judged necessary for missionary strategy and then to make appropriate appointments. 3. To read the appointments of deaconesses, diaconal ministers, lay persons in service under the World Division of the General Board of Global Ministries, and home missionaries. 4. To fix the Charge Conference membership of all ordained ministers appointed to ministries other than the local church in keeping with ¶443.3. 5. To transfer, upon the request of the receiving bishop, ministerial member(s) of one Annual Conference to another, provided said member(s) agrees to transfer; and to send immediately to the secretaries of both conferences involved, to the conference Boards of Ordained Ministry, and to the clearing house of the General Board of Pensions written notices of the transfer of members and of their standing in the course of study if they are undergraduates.

In each Annual Conference, United Methodist bishops serve for four-year terms, and may serve up to three terms before either retirement or appointment to a new Conference. United Methodist bishops may be male or female, with Marjorie Matthews being the first woman to be consecrated a bishop in 1980.

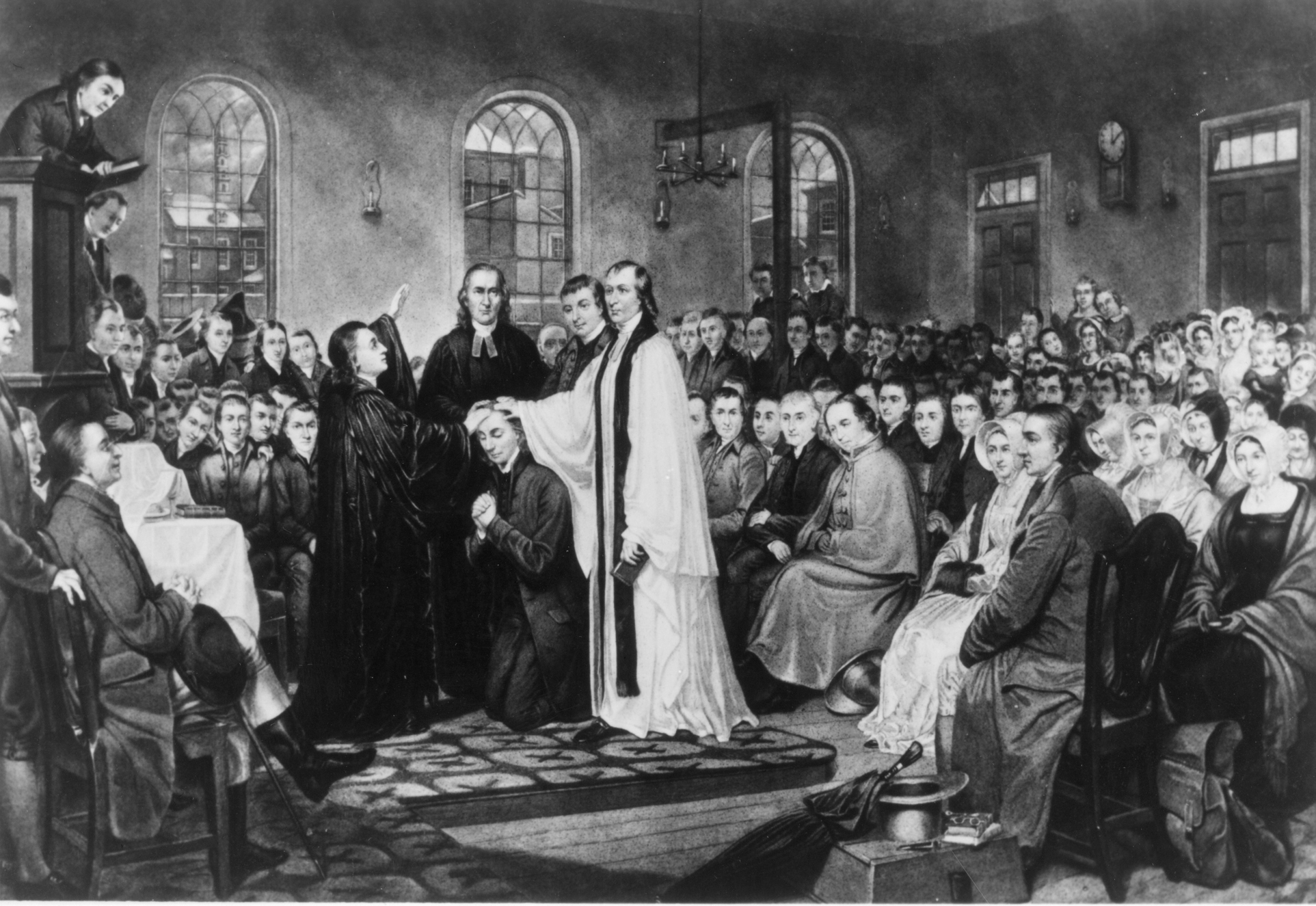
Francis Asbury's ordination as bishop by Thomas Coke at the 1784 Christmas Conference

The collegial expression of episcopal leadership in the United Methodist Church is known as the Council of Bishops. The Council of Bishops speaks to the church and through the church into the world and gives leadership in the quest for Christian unity and interreligious relationships. The Conference of Methodist Bishops includes the United Methodist Council of Bishops plus bishops from affiliated autonomous Methodist or United churches.

John Wesley consecrated Thomas Coke a "General Superintendent", and directed that Francis Asbury also be consecrated for the United States of America in 1784, where the Methodist Episcopal Church first became a separate denomination apart from the Church of England. Coke soon returned to England, but Asbury was the primary builder of the new church. At first he did not call himself bishop, but eventually submitted to the usage by the denomination.

Notable bishops in United Methodist history include Coke, Asbury, Richard Whatcoat, Philip William Otterbein, Martin Boehm, Jacob Albright, John Seybert, Matthew Simpson, John S. Stamm, William Ragsdale Cannon, Marjorie Matthews, Leontine T. Kelly, William B. Oden, Ntambo Nkulu Ntanda, Joseph Sprague, William Henry Willimon, and Thomas Bickerton.

=== The Church of Jesus Christ of Latter-day Saints ===
In The Church of Jesus Christ of Latter-day Saints, the bishop is the leader of a local congregation, called a ward. As with most LDS priesthood holders, the bishop is a part-time lay minister and earns a living through other employment. As such, it is his duty to preside, call local leaders, and judge the worthiness of members for certain activities. The bishop does not deliver sermons at every service (generally asking members to do so), but is expected to be a spiritual guide for his congregation. It is therefore believed that he has both the right and ability to receive divine inspiration (through the Holy Spirit) for the ward under his direction. Because it is a part-time position, all able members are expected to assist in the management of the ward by holding delegated lay positions (for example, women's and youth leaders, teachers) referred to as callings. The bishop is especially responsible for leading the youth, in connection with the fact that a bishop is the president of the Aaronic priesthood in his ward (and is thus a form of Mormon Kohen). Although members are asked to confess serious sins to him, unlike the Catholic Church, he is not the instrument of divine forgiveness, but merely a guide through the repentance process (and a judge in case transgressions warrant excommunication or other official discipline). The bishop is also responsible for the physical welfare of the ward, and thus collects tithing and fast offerings and distributes financial assistance where needed.

A literal descendant of Aaron has "legal right" to act as a bishop after being found worthy and ordained by the First Presidency. In the absence of a literal descendant of Aaron, a high priest in the Melchizedek priesthood is called to be a bishop. Each bishop is selected from resident members of the ward by the stake presidency with approval of the First Presidency, and chooses two counselors to form a bishopric. An priesthood holder called as bishop must be ordained a high priest if he is not already one, unlike the similar function of branch president. In special circumstances (such as a ward consisting entirely of young university students), a bishop may be chosen from outside the ward. Traditionally, bishops are married, though this is not always the case. A bishop is typically released after about five years and a new bishop is called to the position. Although the former bishop is released from his duties, he continues to hold the Aaronic priesthood office of bishop. Church members frequently refer to a former bishop as "Bishop" as a sign of respect and affection.

Latter-day Saint bishops do not wear any special clothing or insignia the way clergy in many other churches do, but are expected to dress and groom themselves neatly and conservatively per their local culture, especially when performing official duties. Bishops (as well as other members of the priesthood) can trace their line of authority back to Joseph Smith, who, according to church doctrine, was ordained to lead the church in modern times by the ancient apostles Peter, James, and John, who were ordained to lead the Church by Jesus Christ.

At the global level, the presiding bishop oversees the temporal affairs (buildings, properties, commercial corporations, and so on) of the worldwide church, including the church's massive global humanitarian aid and social welfare programs. The presiding bishop has two counselors; the three together form the presiding bishopric. As opposed to ward bishoprics, where the counselors do not hold the office of bishop, all three men in the presiding bishopric hold the office of bishop, and thus the counselors, as with the presiding bishop, are formally referred to as "Bishop".

=== Irvingism ===
==== New Apostolic Church ====
The New Apostolic Church (NAC) teaches three classes of ministries: deacons, priests and apostles. The apostles, who are all included in the apostolate with the Chief Apostle as head, are the highest ministries. Of the several kinds of priestly ministries, the bishop is the highest. Nearly all bishops are set in line directly from the chief apostle. They support and help their superior apostle.

=== Pentecostalism ===
==== Church of God in Christ ====
In the Church of God in Christ (COGIC), the ecclesiastical structure is composed of large dioceses that are called "jurisdictions" within COGIC, each under the authority of a bishop, sometimes called "state bishops". They can either be made up of large geographical regions of churches or churches that are grouped and organized together as their own separate jurisdictions because of similar affiliations, regardless of geographical location or dispersion. Each state in the U.S. has at least one jurisdiction while others may have several more, and each jurisdiction is usually composed of between 30 and 100 churches. Each jurisdiction is then broken down into several districts, which are smaller groups of churches (either grouped by geographical situation or by similar affiliations) which are each under the authority of District Superintendents who answer to the authority of their jurisdictional/state bishop. There are currently over 170 jurisdictions in the United States, and over 30 jurisdictions in other countries. The bishops of each jurisdiction, according to the COGIC Manual, are considered to be the modern day equivalent in the church of the early apostles and overseers of the New Testament church, and as the highest ranking clergymen in the COGIC, they are tasked with the responsibilities of being the head overseers of all religious, civil, and economic ministries and protocol for the church denomination. They also have the authority to appoint and ordain local pastors, elders, ministers, and reverends within the denomination. The bishops of the COGIC denomination are all collectively called "The Board of Bishops". From the Board of Bishops, and the General Assembly of the COGIC, the body of the church composed of clergy and lay delegates that are responsible for making and enforcing the bylaws of the denomination, every four years, twelve bishops from the COGIC are elected as "The General Board" of the church, who work alongside the delegates of the General Assembly and Board of Bishops to provide administration over the denomination as the church's head executive leaders. One of twelve bishops of the General Board is also elected the "presiding bishop" of the church, and two others are appointed by the presiding bishop himself, as his first and second assistant presiding bishops.

Bishops in the Church of God in Christ usually wear black clergy suits which consist of a black suit blazer, black pants, a purple or scarlet clergy shirt and a white clerical collar, which is usually referred to as "Class B Civic attire". Bishops in COGIC also typically wear the Anglican Choir Dress style vestments of a long purple or scarlet chimere, cuffs, and tippet worn over a long white rochet, and a gold pectoral cross worn around the neck with the tippet. This is usually referred to as "Class A Ceremonial attire". The bishops of COGIC alternate between Class A Ceremonial attire and Class B Civic attire depending on the protocol of the religious services and other events they have to attend.

==== Church of God (Cleveland, Tennessee) ====
In the polity of the Church of God (Cleveland, Tennessee), the international leader is the presiding bishop, and the members of the executive committee are executive bishops. Collectively, they supervise and appoint national and state leaders across the world. Leaders of individual states and regions are administrative bishops, who have jurisdiction over local churches in their respective states and are vested with appointment authority for local pastorates. All ministers are credentialed at one of three levels of licensure, the most senior of which is the rank of ordained bishop. To be eligible to serve in state, national, or international positions of authority, a minister must hold the rank of ordained bishop.

=== Seventh-day Adventists ===
According to the Seventh-day Adventist understanding of the doctrine of the church:

"The "elders" (Greek, presbuteros) or "bishops" (episkopos) were the most important officers of the church. The term elder means older one, implying dignity and respect. His position was similar to that of the one who had supervision of the synagogue. The term bishop means "overseer". Paul used these terms interchangeably, equating elders with overseers or bishops (Acts 20:17, 28; Titus 1:5, 7).

"Those who held this position supervised the newly formed churches. Elder referred to the status or rank of the office, while bishop denoted the duty or responsibility of the office—"overseer". Since the apostles also called themselves elders (1 Peter 5:1; 2 John 1; 3 John 1), it is apparent that there were both local elders and itinerant elders, or elders at large. But both kinds of elder functioned as shepherds of the congregations."

The above understanding is part of the basis of Adventist organizational structure. The world wide Seventh-day Adventist church is organized into local districts, conferences or missions, union conferences or union missions, divisions, and finally at the top is the general conference. At each level (with exception to the local districts), there is an elder who is elected president and a group of elders who serve on the executive committee with the elected president. Those who have been elected president would in effect be the "bishop" while never actually carrying the title or ordained as such because the term is usually associated with the episcopal style of church governance most often found in Catholic, Anglican, Methodist and some Pentecostal/Charismatic circles.

=== Others ===
Some Baptists also have begun taking on the title of bishop; and the position was recognized in several early Baptist confessions of faith (although, considering elders and bishops as the same). In some smaller Protestant denominations and independent churches, the term bishop is used in the same way as pastor, to refer to the leader of the local congregation; and these bishops may be male or female. This usage is especially common in African-American churches, particularly through the Full Gospel Baptist Church Fellowship.

In the Church of Scotland, which has a Presbyterian church structure, the word "bishop" refers to an ordained person, usually a normal parish minister, who has temporary oversight of a trainee minister. Previously, in the Presbyterian Church (USA) the term "bishop" was an expressive name for a Minister of Word and Sacrament who served a congregation and exercises "the oversight of the flock of Christ." However the title was not normally used and no longer appears in the Book of Order. The use of the term "bishop" in American Presbyterianism is traceable to the 1789 Form of Government of the denomination that would become the contemporary PC(USA). Reformed churches on the whole do not tend to have bishops, although there are exceptions.

While not considered orthodox Christian, the Ecclesia Gnostica Catholica uses roles and titles derived from Christianity for its clerical hierarchy, including bishops who have much the same authority and responsibilities as in Catholicism.

The Salvation Army does not have bishops but has appointed leaders of geographical areas, known as Divisional Commanders. Larger geographical areas, called territories, are led by a territorial commander, who is the highest-ranking officer in that territory.

Jehovah's Witnesses do not use the title 'bishop' within their organizational structure, but appoint elders to be overseers (to fulfill the role of oversight) within their congregations.

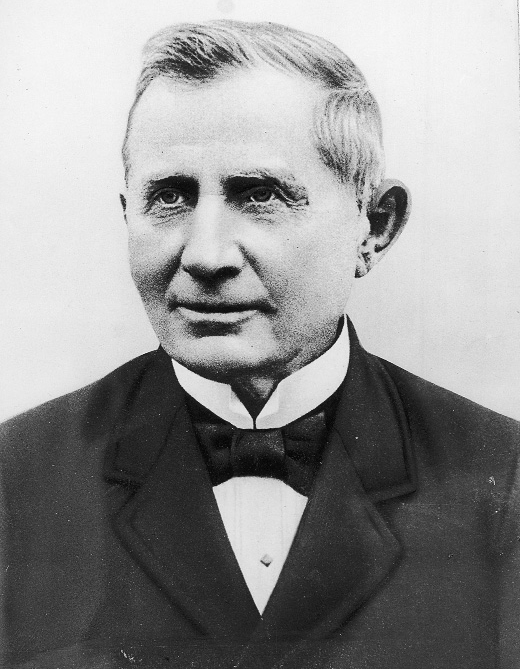
Ludwig Ingwer Nommensen, the German Lutheran missionary from Rhenish Missionary Society, also first Ephorus of the Batak Christian Protestant Church

The Batak Christian Protestant Church of Indonesia, the most prominent Protestant denomination in Indonesia, uses the term Ephorus instead of bishop.

In the Vietnamese syncretist religion of Caodaism, bishops (giáo sư) comprise the fifth of nine hierarchical levels, and are responsible for spiritual and temporal education as well as record-keeping and ceremonies in their parishes. At any one time there are seventy-two bishops. Their authority is described in Section I of the text Tân Luật (revealed through seances in December 1926). Caodai bishops wear robes and headgear of embroidered silk depicting the Divine Eye and the Eight Trigrams. (The color varies according to branch.) This is the full ceremonial dress; the simple version consists of a seven-layered turban.

In Amish and Conservative Mennonite church organization, bishop is the highest rank in the clergy, although Amish and Mennonite bishops usually oversee regions comparable to a parish priest in more highly-organized denominations. Liberal Mennonite conferences do not have bishops.

== Dress and insignia in Christianity ==
Traditionally, a number of items are associated with the office of a bishop, most notably the mitre and the crosier. Other vestments and insignia vary between Eastern and Western Christianity.

In the Latin Church of the broader Catholic Church, the choir dress of a bishop includes the purple cassock with amaranth trim, rochet, purple zucchetto (skull cap), purple biretta, and pectoral cross. The cappa magna may be worn, but only within the bishop's own diocese and on especially solemn occasions. The mitre, zucchetto, and stole are generally worn by bishops when presiding over liturgical functions. For liturgical functions other than the Mass the bishop typically wears the cope. Within his own diocese and when celebrating solemnly elsewhere with the consent of the local ordinary, he also uses the crosier. When celebrating Mass, a bishop, like a priest, wears the chasuble. The Caeremoniale Episcoporum recommends, but does not impose, that in solemn celebrations a bishop should also wear a dalmatic, which can always be white, beneath the chasuble, especially when administering the sacrament of holy orders, blessing an abbot or abbess, and dedicating a church or an altar. The Caeremoniale Episcoporum no longer makes mention of episcopal gloves, episcopal sandals, liturgical stockings (also known as buskins), or the accoutrements that it once prescribed for the bishop's horse. The coat of arms of a Latin Church Catholic bishop usually displays a galero with a cross and crosier behind the escutcheon; the specifics differ by location and ecclesiastical rank (see Ecclesiastical heraldry).

Anglican bishops generally make use of the mitre, crosier, ecclesiastical ring, purple cassock, purple zucchetto, and pectoral cross. However, the traditional choir dress of Anglican bishops retains its late mediaeval form, and looks quite different from that of their Catholic counterparts; it consists of a long rochet which is worn with a chimere.

In the Eastern churches (Eastern Orthodox, Eastern Rite Catholic) a bishop will wear the mandyas, panagia (and perhaps an enkolpion), sakkos, omophorion and an Eastern-style mitre. Eastern bishops do not normally wear an episcopal ring; the faithful kiss (or, alternatively, touch their forehead to) the bishop's hand. To seal official documents, he will usually use an inked stamp. An Eastern bishop's coat of arms will normally display an Eastern-style mitre, cross, Eastern-style crosier and a red and white (or red and gold) mantle. The arms of Oriental Orthodox bishops will display the episcopal insignia (mitre or turban) specific to their own liturgical traditions. Variations occur based upon jurisdiction and national customs.

=== Cathedra ===
In Catholic, Eastern Orthodox, Oriental Orthodox, Lutheran and Anglican cathedrals there is a special chair set aside for the exclusive use of the bishop. This is the bishop's cathedra and is often called the throne. In some Christian denominations, for example, the Anglican Communion, parish churches may maintain a chair for the use of the bishop when he visits; this is to signify the parish's union with the bishop.

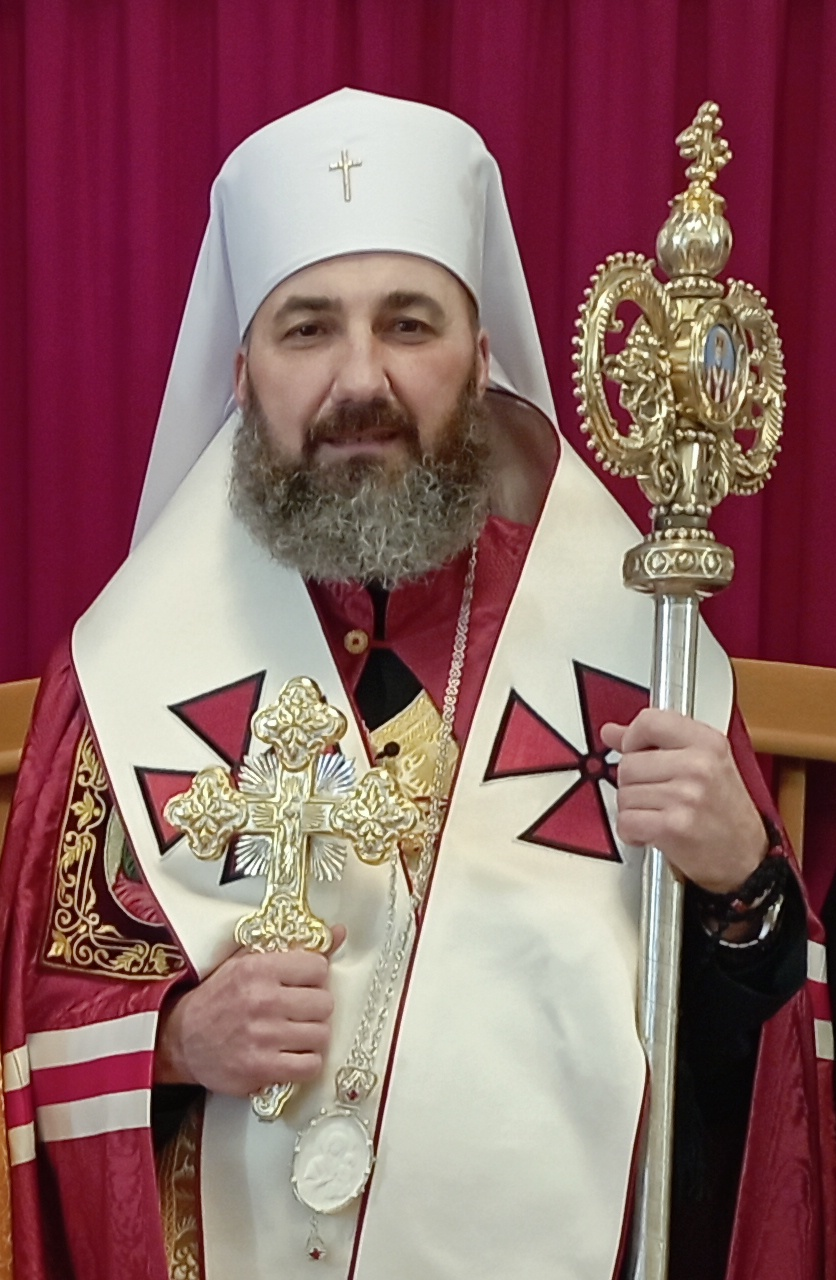
Byzantine Rite Catholic bishop in non-liturgical clothing

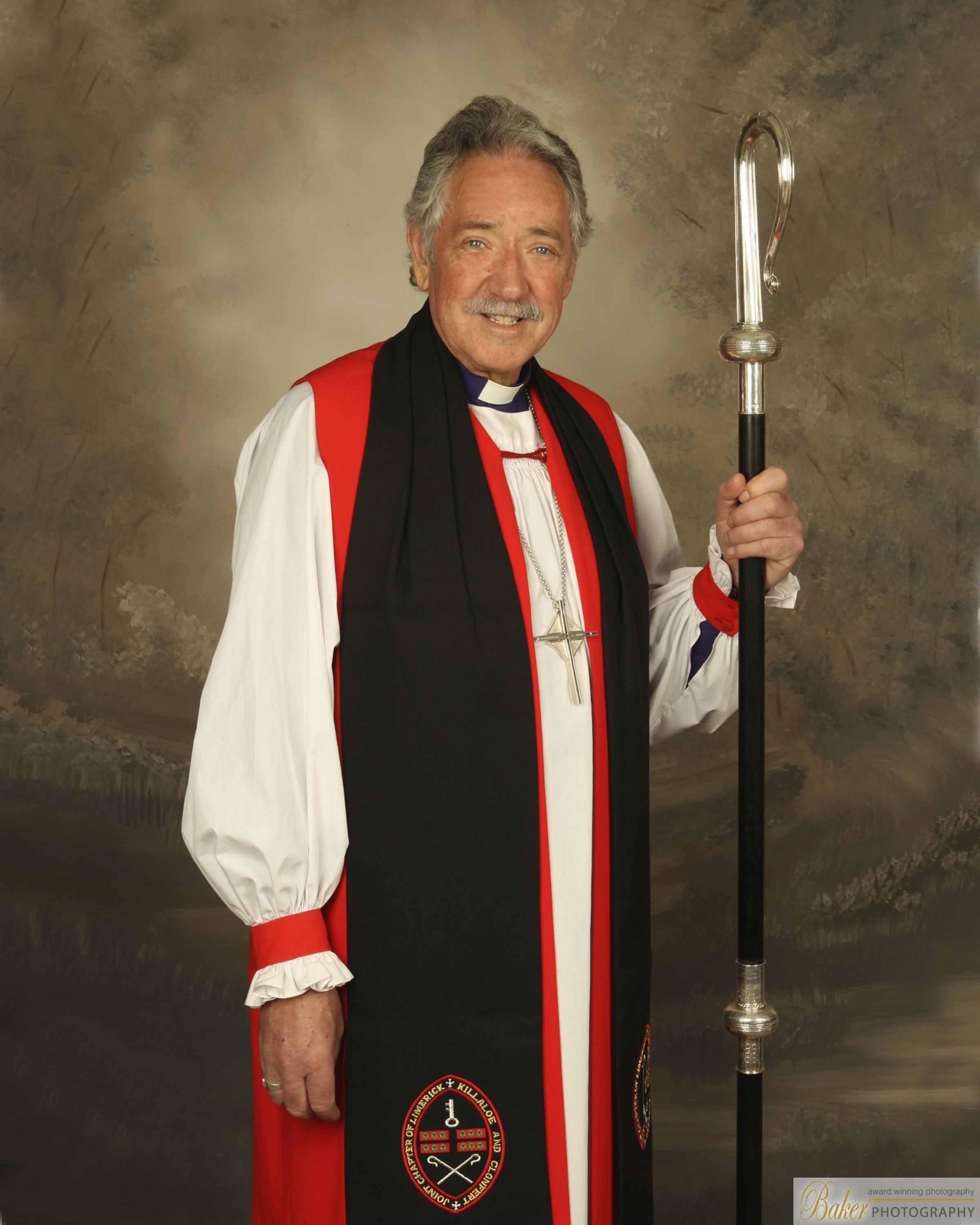
An Anglican bishop with a crosier, wearing a rochet under a red chimere and cuffs, a black tippet, and a pectoral cross

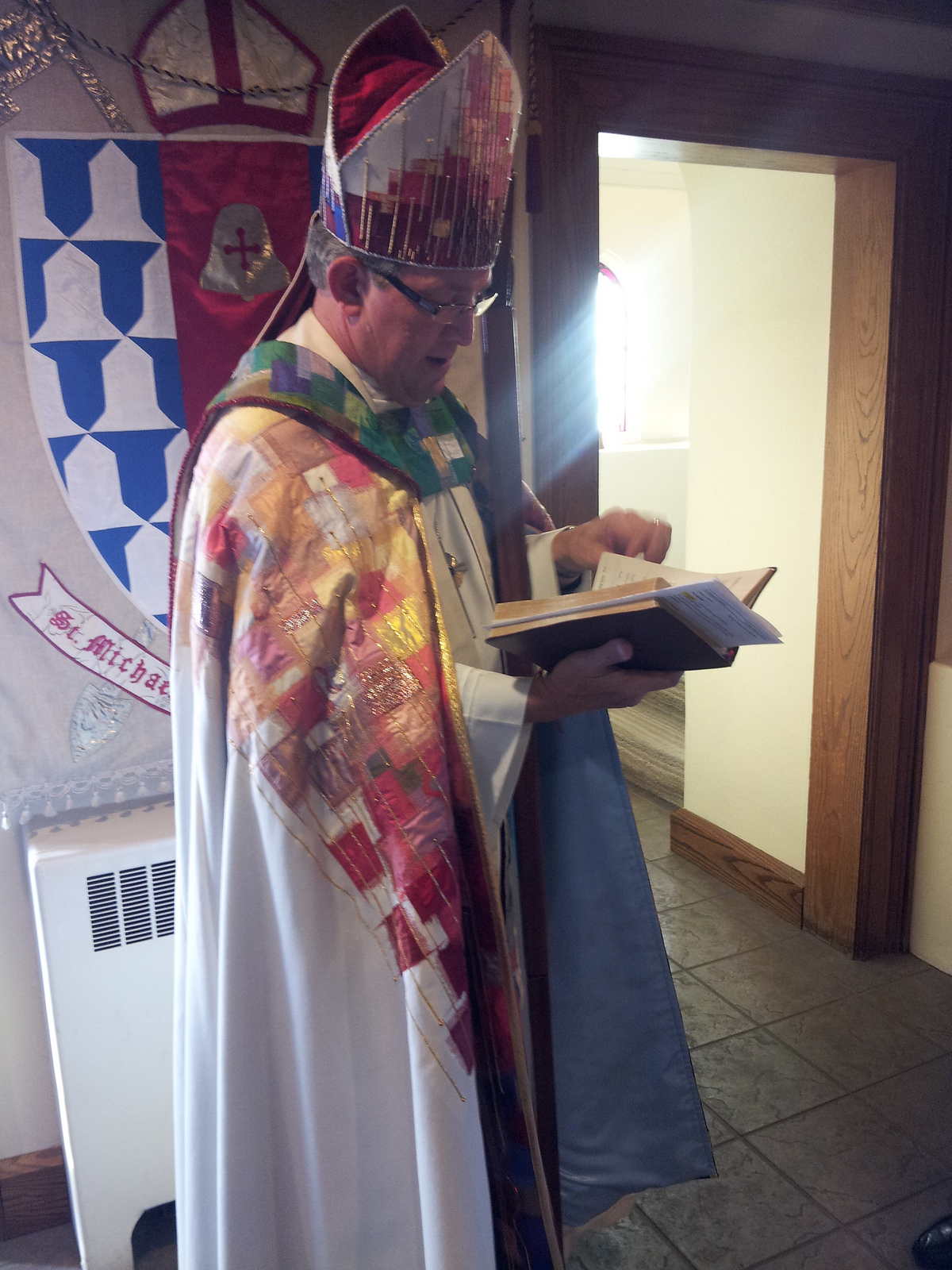
An Episcopal bishop immediately before presiding at the Great Vigil of Easter in the narthex of St. Michael's Episcopal Cathedral in Boise, Idaho.

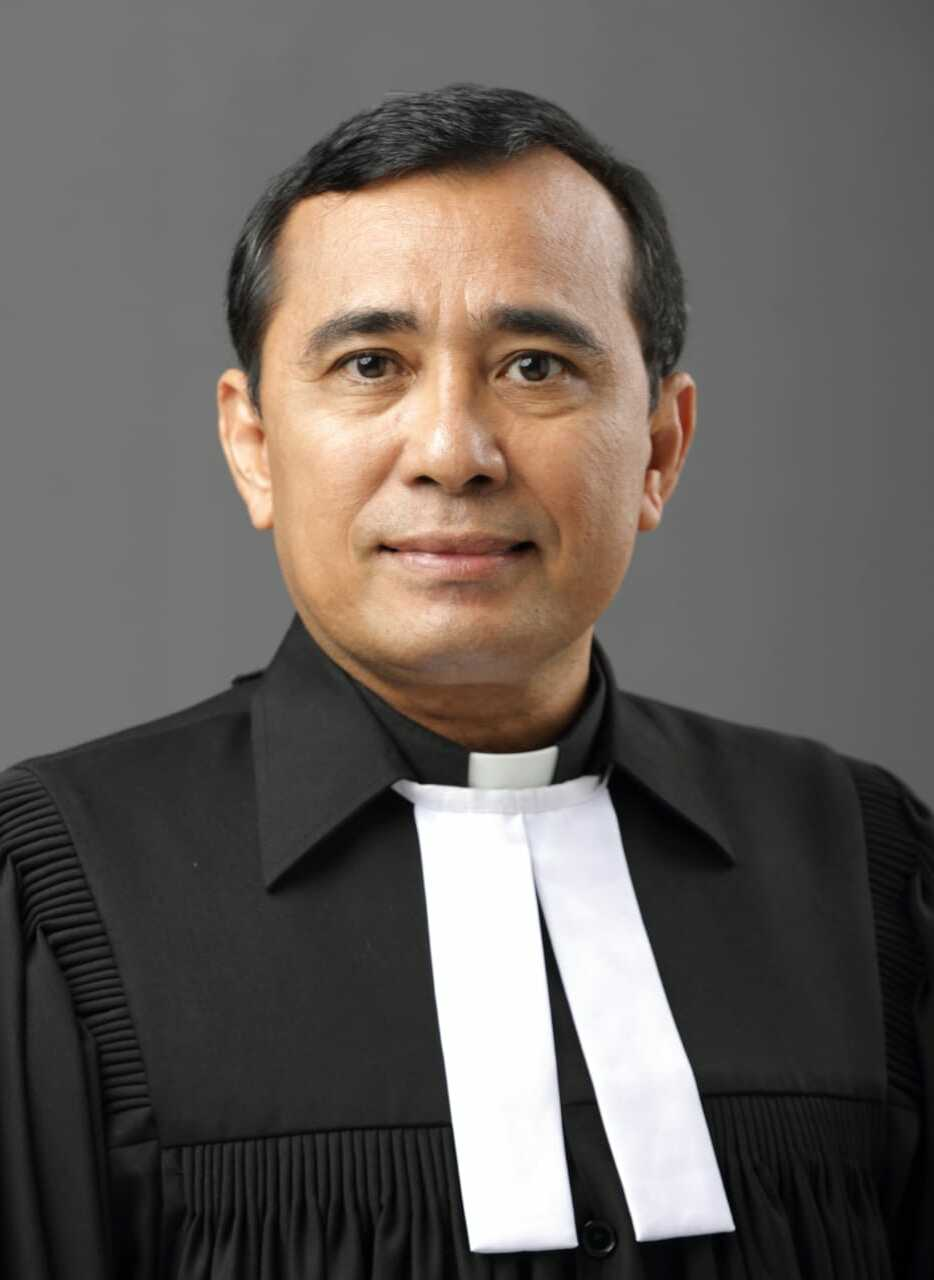
An Ephorus of the Batak Christian Protestant Church in Indonesia, one of the largest Lutheran churches in Southeast Asia, wearing white bands and Geneva gown

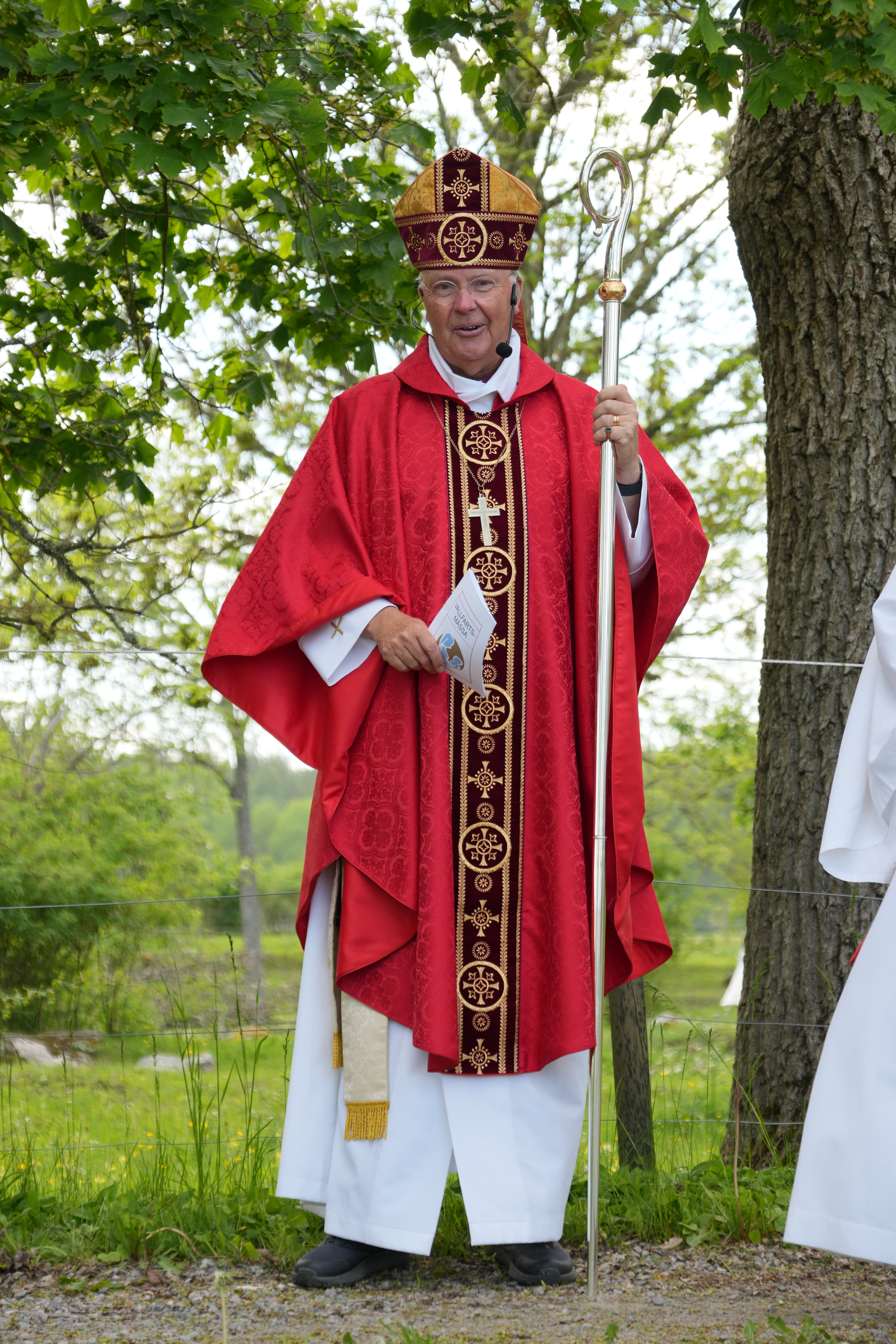
A Lutheran bishop wearing liturgical vestments prior to celebrating a pilgrimage mass

== In non-Christian religions ==
=== Buddhism ===
The leader of the Buddhist Churches of America (BCA) is their bishop. The Japanese title for the bishop of the BCA is sochō, although the English title is favored over the Japanese. When it comes to many other Buddhist terms, the BCA chose to keep them in their original language (terms such as sangha and dana), but with some words (including sochō), they changed/translated these terms into English words.

Between 1899 and 1944, the BCA held the name Buddhist Mission of North America. The leader of the Buddhist Mission of North America was called kantoku (superintendent/director) between 1899 and 1918. In 1918 the kantoku was promoted to bishop (sochō). However, according to George J. Tanabe, the title "bishop" was in practice already used by Hawaiian Shin Buddhists (in Honpa Hongwanji Mission of Hawaii) even when the official title was kantoku.

Bishops are also present in other Japanese Buddhist organizations. Higashi Hongan-ji's North American District, Honpa Honganji Mission of Hawaii, Jodo Shinshu Buddhist Temples of Canada, a Jodo Shu temple in Los Angeles, the Shingon temple Koyasan Buddhist Temple, Sōtō Mission in Hawai'i (a Soto Zen Buddhist institution), and the Sōtō Zen Buddhist Community of South America (Comunidade Budista Sōtō Zenshū da América do Sul) all have or have had leaders with the title bishop. As for the Sōtō Zen Buddhist Community of South America, the Japanese title is sōkan, but the leader is in practice referred to as "bishop".

=== Tenrikyo ===
Tenrikyo is a Japanese New Religion with influences from both Shinto and Buddhism. The leader of the Tenrikyo North American Mission has the title of bishop.

== See also ==
- Anglican bishops
- Appointment of Catholic bishops
- Appointment of Church of England bishops
- Bishop in Europe
- Bishops in the Catholic Church
- Bishop of Alexandria, or Pope
- Bishops in the Church of Scotland
- Diocesan bishop
- Ecclesiastical polity (church governance)
  - Congregationalist polity
  - Presbyterian polity
- Ganzibra
- Gay bishops
- Hierarchy of the Catholic Church
- List of Catholic bishops of the United States
- List of metropolitans and patriarchs of Moscow
- List of types of spiritual teachers
- List of Lutheran bishops and archbishops
- Lists of patriarchs, archbishops, and bishops
- Lord Bishop
- Order of precedence in the Catholic Church
- Shepherd in religion
- Spokesperson bishops in the Church of England
- Suffragan Bishop in Europe
