= John Seybert =

American bishop (1781–1860)

John Seybert (July 7, 1791 – 1860) was an American bishop of the Evangelical Association. He was only the second Bishop of this denomination, a predecessor to the Evangelical United Brethren Church (and the United Methodist Church). He was elected at the General Conference of 1839.

== Birth and family ==
Seybert was born July 7, 1791 in Manheim, Pennsylvania and died January 4, 1860 near Flat Rock, Ohio. His father, Henry, had been a German mercenary soldier in the British army during the American Revolutionary War. He was captured and imprisoned at Lancaster, Pennsylvania. After the war, he became something of an indentured servant to a Mr. Schaffner, serving for three years. In 179,0, Henry was married to Susan Kreuzer. Two of their four sons survived to maturity, John and David.

Seybert never married.

== Early life and conversion ==
John, Sr. was confirmed in the Lutheran faith. He received an elementary education in German and English. The family prospered, John receiving in 1806 at his father's death a farm near Manheim. One year after Henry's death, John's mother deserted her sons and entered a religious community at Harmony, Pennsylvania, called the Rappites. Though John maintained contact with her until his death, her actions permanently alienated David from their mother.

Though raised, even confirmed, a Lutheran, John was converted at a revival held by an itinerant Evangelical preacher, Matthias Betz, in Manheim, 21 June 1810. Immediately, he showed great zeal for the Christian faith. He was chosen as the class leader of a class that met in Manheim. He was also recruited as class leader of a class that met in nearby Mount Joy.

== Ordained ministry ==
Seybert was brought into the preaching ministry of the Evangelical Association by the Rev. John Dreisbach, an early denominational leader. Seybert was received as a preacher-on-trial in 1819 and appointed to the Lancaster Circuit. He began a strenuous discipline of Biblical and theological study, which he followed throughout his long ministry.

In 1822, Seybert was ordained a deacon. He went on to serve other churches/circuits, finally arriving in the Ohio Conference. While traveling through swampy areas of Ohio, he contracted malaria, which kept him in precarious health the rest of his life. In 1824, he was ordained an elder. In 1825 he was elected to the supervisory position of presiding elder, appointed to the Canaan District in Pennsylvania (a large area mostly east of the Susquehanna River, south into Virginia, and north into New York).

== Episcopal ministry ==
The expansion of the Evangelical Association, both in territory as well as the increasing complexity of its Charitable and Mission Societies, led the denomination in 1839 to adopt a great centralization of leadership. This led to John Seybert's election as Bishop, the first Evangelical leader to hold that office since the death of the founder, Bishop Jacob Albright in 1808. Seybert accepted this election only after much prayer and self-examination.

As a bishop, Seybert was required to travel extensively throughout the expanding Church, both in general ministry as well as to preside at all Conferences. He traveled by carriage where roads were passable. Where there were no roads, he traveled on horseback, and sometimes walked. His travels ranged from New York to New Jersey, to the Shenandoah Valley, to southwestern Pennsylvania, as far west as St. Louis, eastern Iowa, northern Illinois, Milwaukee, Detroit, Waterloo in Canada, Buffalo, and the Mohawk Valley. In one year (1850), for example, he traveled 106 days in Pennsylvania, 50 days in New York, 60 days in Ohio, 11 days in Michigan, 34 days in Indiana, 81 days in Illinois, 14 days in Wisconsin, 6 days in Maryland, and 3 days in Canada (for a total of 365 days). Although in later years he could have traveled by train, Bishop Seybert continued his previous methods of travel because it allowed him to minister to people in need all along his route.

== See also ==
- List of bishops of the United Methodist Church
