= Flat Rock, Ohio =

Flat Rock
- Census-designated place
- Location within the state of Ohio
- Coordinates: 41°14′08″N 82°51′33″W
- Country: United States
- State: Ohio
- County: Seneca
- Township: Thompson

Area
  - Total: 0.21 sq mi (0.55 km^{2})
  - Land: 0.21 sq mi (0.55 km^{2})
  - Water: 0 sq mi (0.00 km^{2})
- Elevation: 801 ft (244 m)

Population (2020)
  - Total: 227
  - Density: 1,069.0/sq mi (412.76/km^{2})
- Time zone: UTC-5 (Eastern (EST))
  - Summer (DST): UTC-4 (EDT)
- ZIP codes: 44828
- FIPS code: 39-27356
- GNIS feature ID: 2628891

Flat Rock is a census-designated place in northeastern Thompson Township, Seneca County, Ohio, United States. It has a post office with the ZIP code 44828. The population was 227 at the 2020 census.

== History ==
Flat Rock was originally called Lewisville, and under the latter name was platted in 1841. A post office called Flat Rock has been in operation since 1846. The present name comes from a flat layer of rock covering an artesian aquifer.

== Demographics ==
Historical population
Census	Pop.	Note	%±
2020	227		—
U.S. Decennial Census

== Place of interest ==
- Seneca Caverns
