= Seneca Caverns (Ohio) =

Caves in Seneca County, Ohio, USA

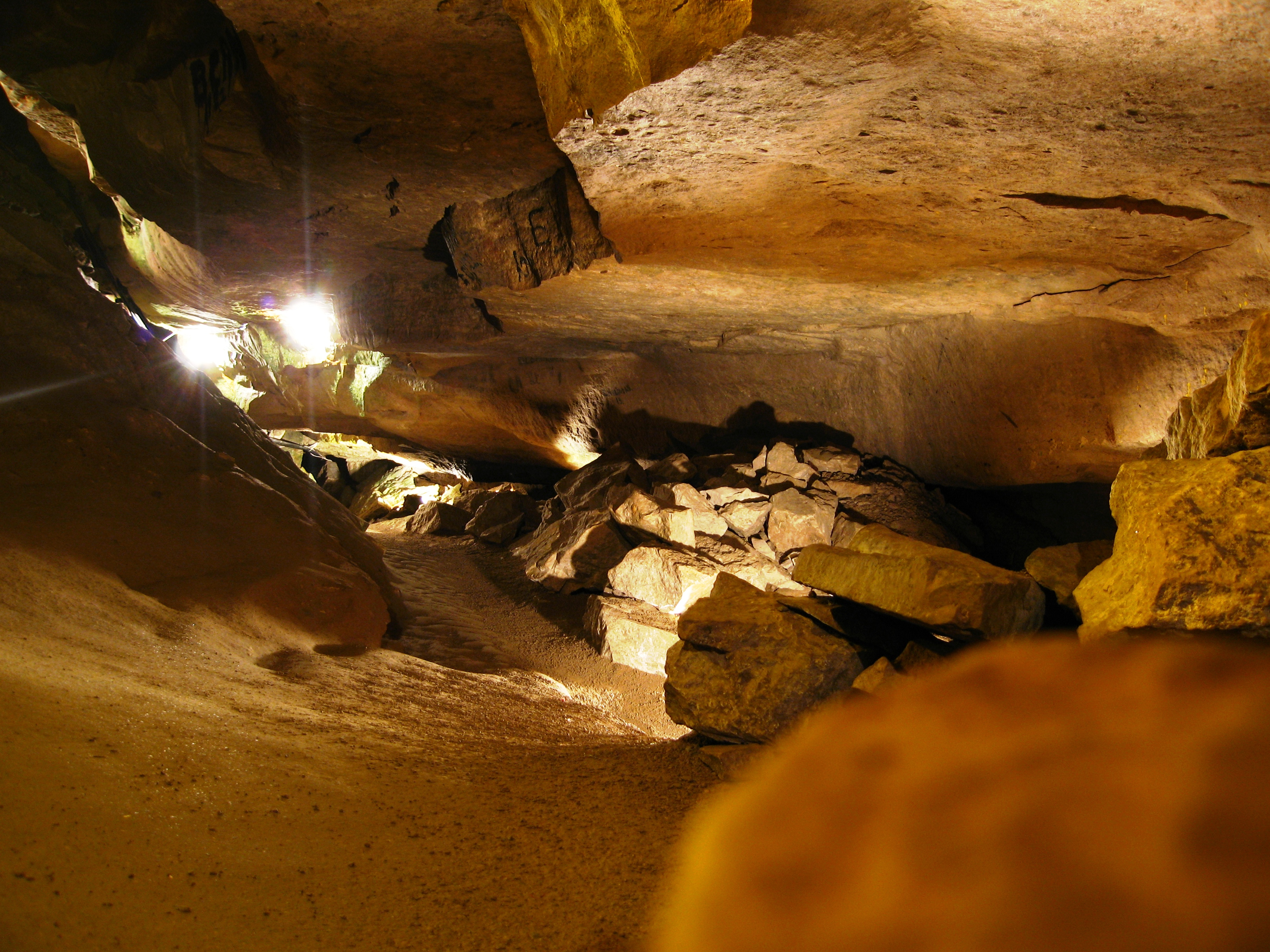
- A subterranean gallery in Seneca Caverns.
- Interactive map of Seneca Caverns
- Location: Flat Rock, Ohio
- Depth: Unknown
- Length: Unknown
- Discovery: 1872
- Geology: Columbus Limestone and Lucas Dolomite
- Entrances: One
- Access: Fee

Seneca Caverns is a show cave located in northeastern Seneca County, Ohio, USA, just outside Flat Rock. The cave is designated as a Registered Natural Landmark by the Ohio Department of Natural Resources.

== History ==
The cave was discovered in June 1872 by two boys named Peter Rutan and Henry Homer while they were hunting rabbits with their dog. The dog chased a rabbit into a brush pile, where they then disappeared. While searching through the brush pile, the two boys found an opening, fell through it, and landed in the first level of the cave, where they found their dog. The boys returned home and told everyone about their discovery. The cave became known as Good's Cave, named for Emmanuel Good, the owner of the farm on which the cave was located.

In 1931, Don Bell, a lawyer from Bellevue, discovered a series of passageways and rooms in the cave which led to an underground river, called Ole' Mist'ry River, which is part of the vast groundwater system that underlies the surrounding region. After two and a half years of improvement effort, the cave was renamed Seneca Caverns and opened to the public on May 14, 1933.

== Levels ==
There are 7 levels that are open to the public

- Level 1: "Foyer", entrance, and exit. About 20 ft under ground.
- Level 2: "Fossil Room". About 30 ft under ground.
- Level 3: "Chert Alley." About 55 ft under ground.
- Level 4: "Inscription Hall", "Cathedral Hall" and "West Hall". Ranges from 60 to 65 ft under ground. Largest level at 250 ft in length.
- Level 5: Beginning of Lucas Dolomite. About 80 ft under ground. Typical water level in spring.
- Level 6: Smallest level. Ranges from 95 to 100 ft under ground. Typical water level in early to mid summer.
- Level 7: "River Room". About 110 ft underground. Typical water level in late summer to autumn.

There are lower levels that have only been explored during severe droughts

- Level 8: Flooded. Deepest level for early public tours of the 1930s. No longer part of the tour.
- Level 9: Flooded.
- Level 10: Flooded.
- Level 11: Flooded.
- Level 12: Flooded. About 220 ft underground. Deepest level any person has reached.
- Levels 13+: Unknown

== Gallery ==
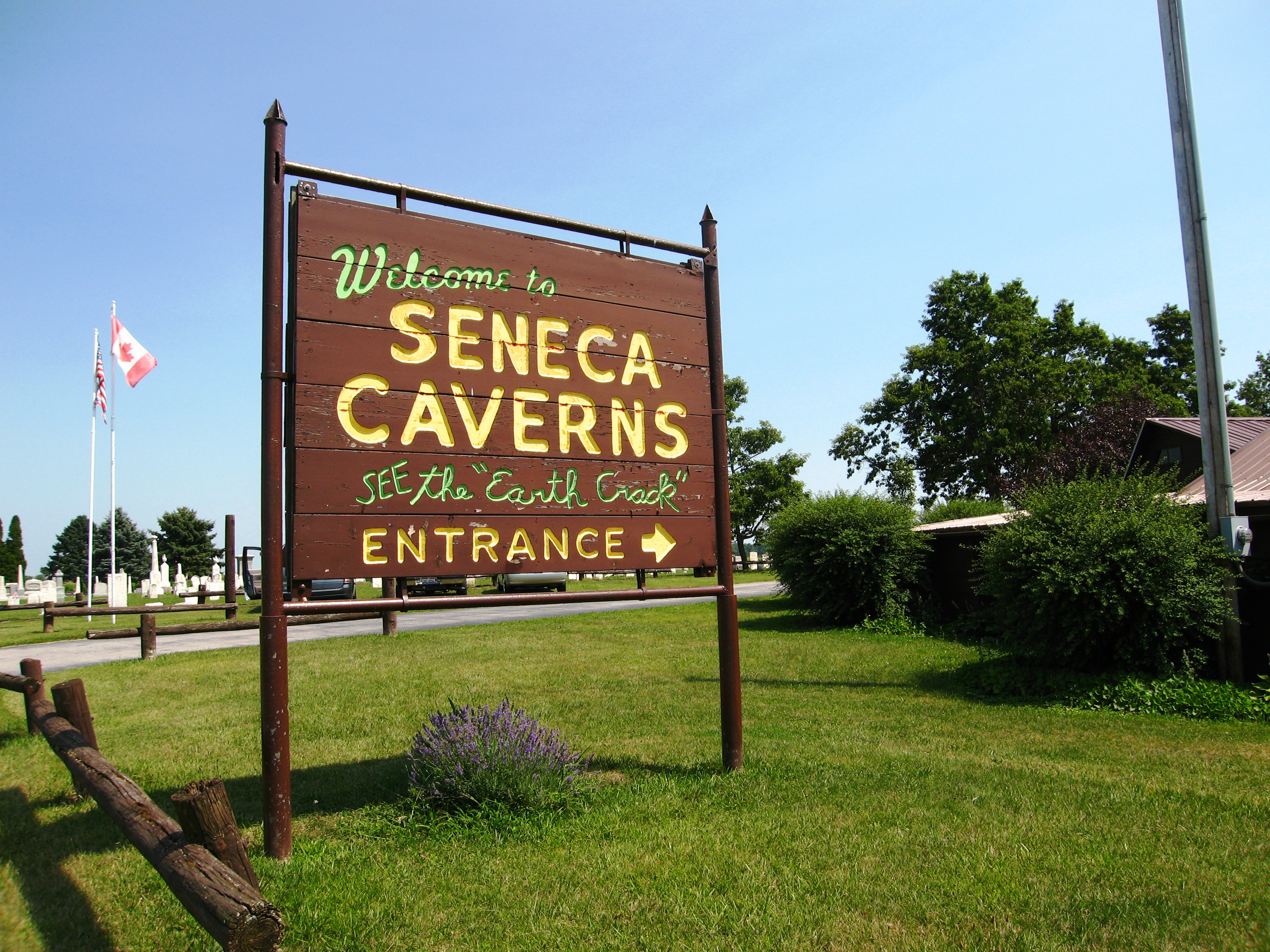
Entrance sign

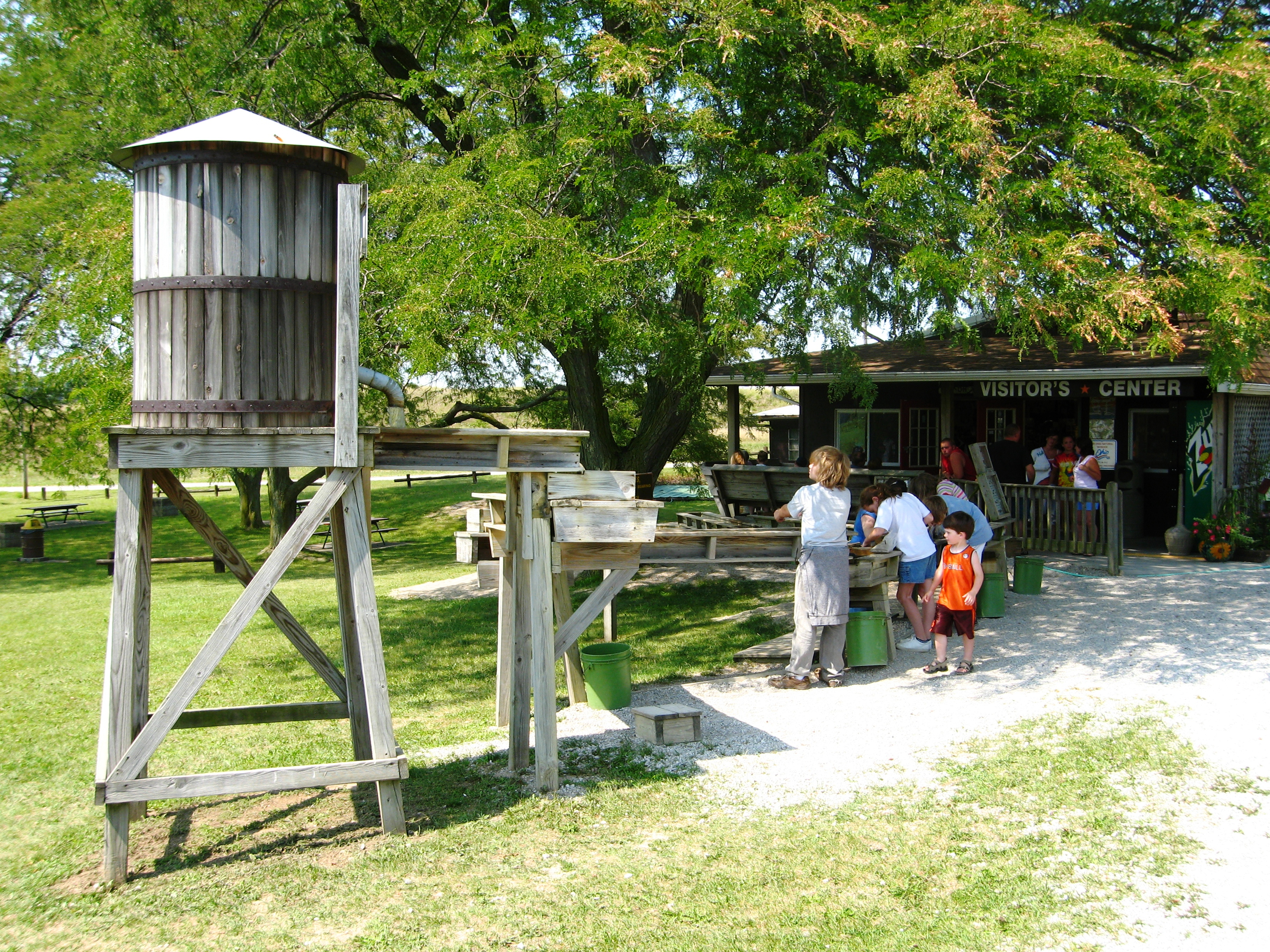
Visitor's center

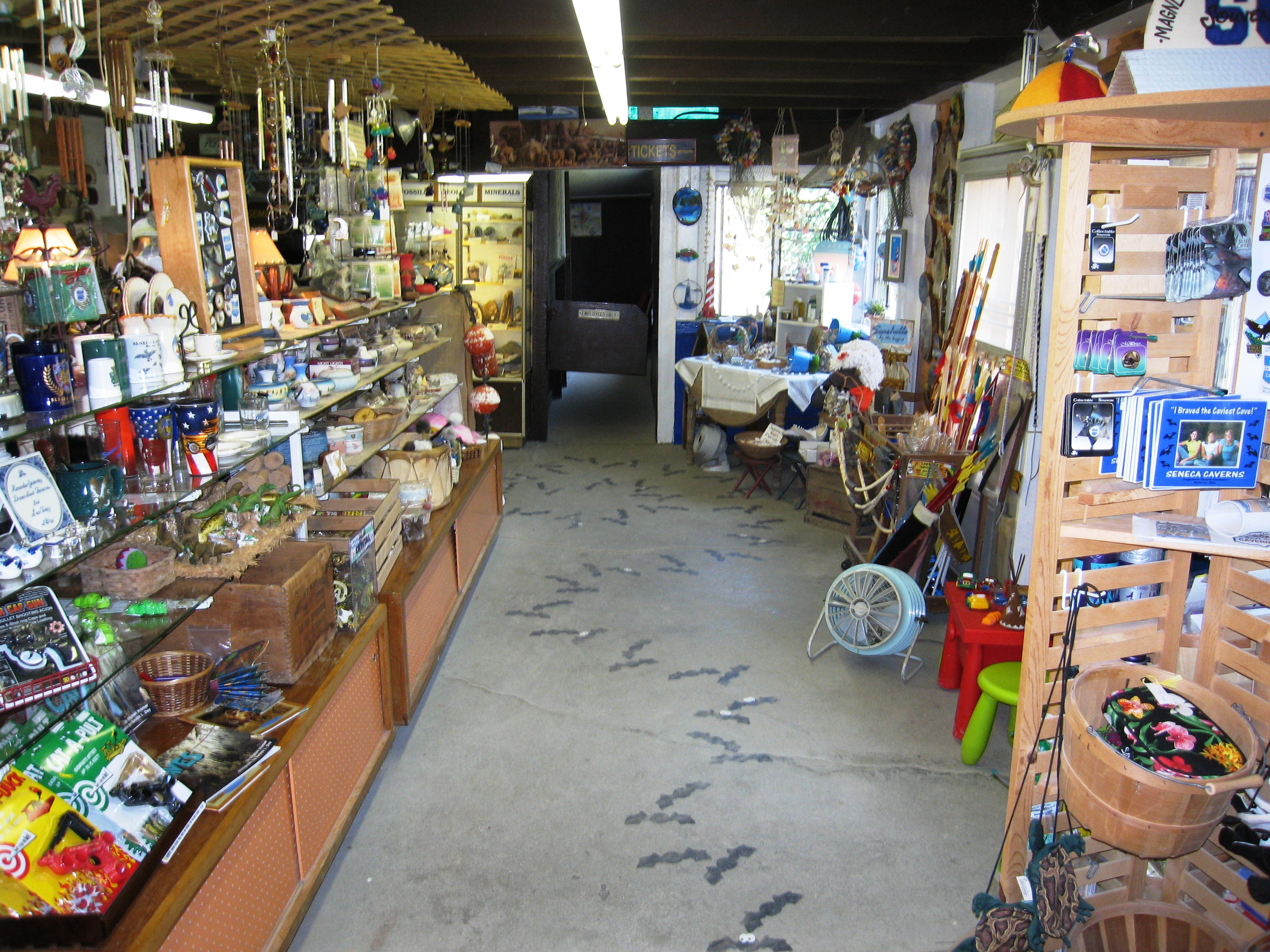
Gift shop

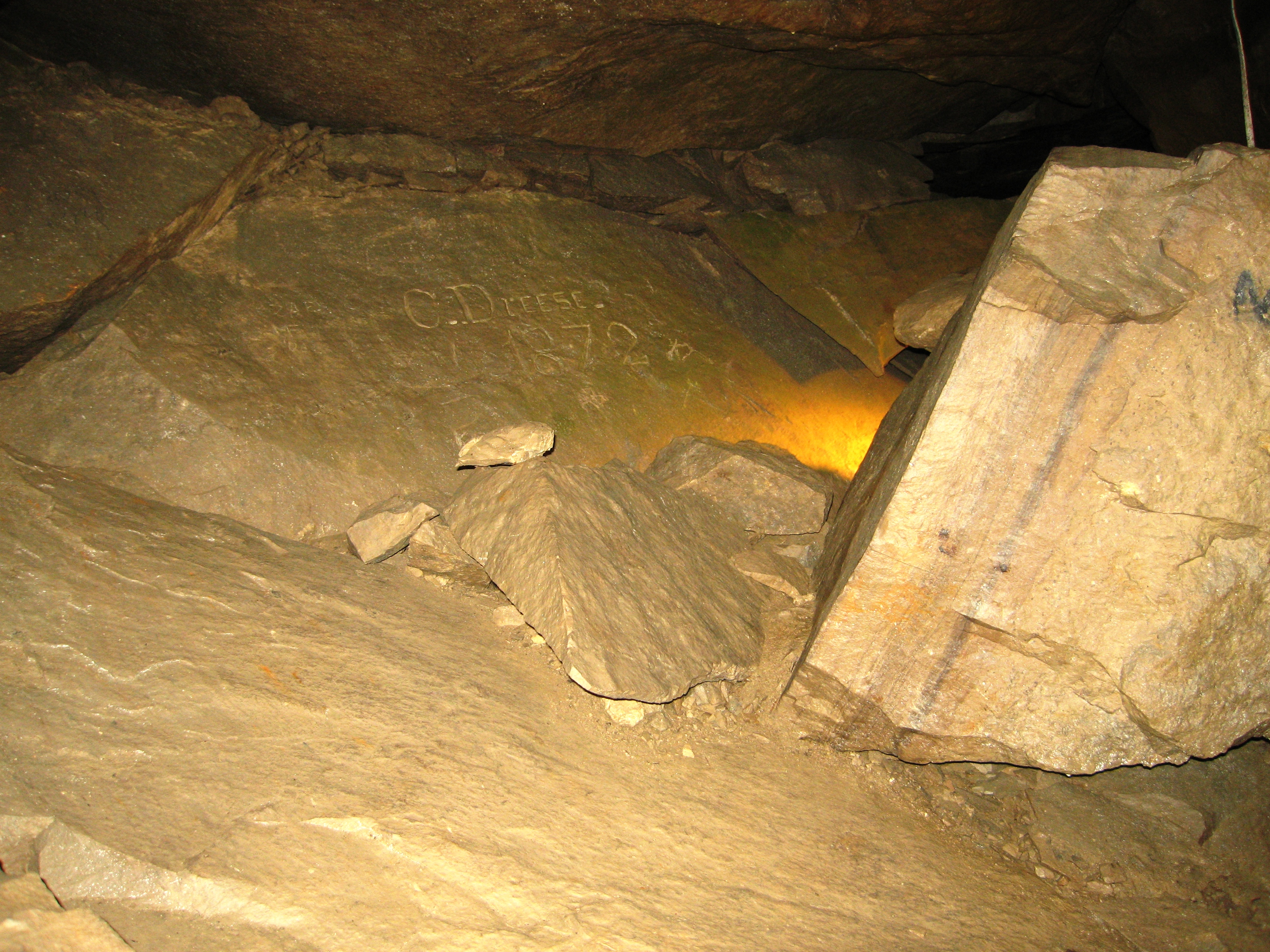
The oldest graffiti in Seneca Caverns. It reads: "C. Dreese 1872".

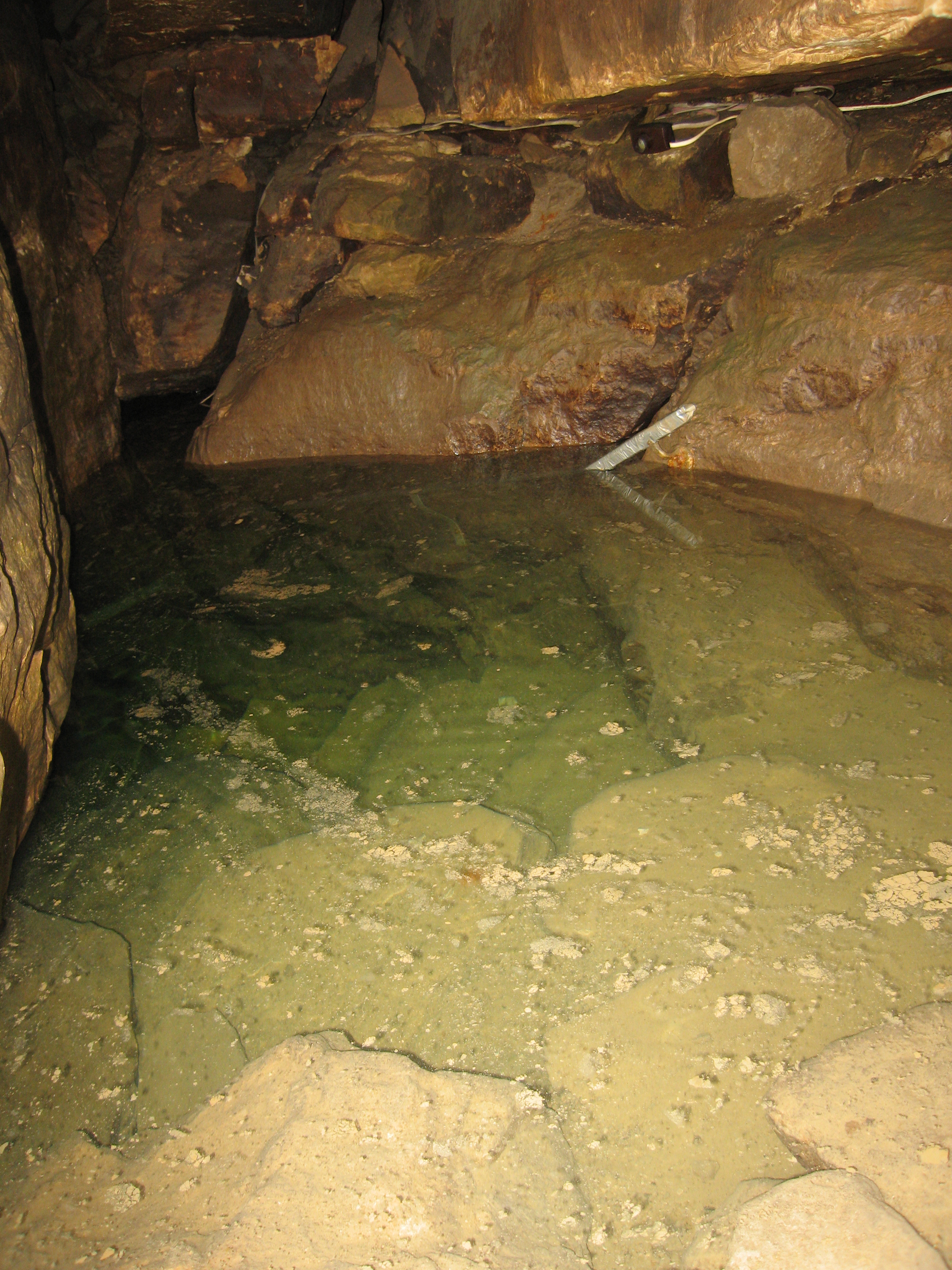
Submerged stairway leading down from the sixth to the seventh level of Seneca Caverns.
