= Siebert =

Siebert is a surname derived from the Germanic personal name composed of the elements sigi ‘victory’ + berht ‘bright’, ‘famous’.

Notable people with the surname include:

- Allan Siebert (born 1942), American bridge player
- Babe Siebert (1904–1939), Canadian professional ice hockey player
- Bernd Siebert (politician) (born 1949), German politician
- Charles Siebert (1938–2022), American actor and television director
- Christoph Siebert, German choral conductor
- Daniel Lee Siebert (1954–2008), American serial killer
- Daniel Siebert (ethnobotanist) (contemporary), American ethnobotanist, pharmacognosist, and author
- Daniel Siebert (referee) (born 1984), German football referee
- Detlef Siebert (contemporary), British television writer and director
- Dick Siebert (1912–1978), American professional baseball player
- Friedrich Siebert (1888–1950), German Army general of World War II
- Gloria Siebert (born 1964), German Olympic hurdler
- Günter Siebert (footballer) (1930–2017), German footballer
- Günter Siebert (weightlifter) (born 1931), German weightlifter
- Hannes Siebert (born 1961), South African diplomat
- Klaus Siebert (1955–2016), German Olympic biathlete
- Ludwig Siebert (1874–1942), German lawyer and Nazi Party politician
- Ludwig Siebert (bobsleigh) (1939–2016), West German bobsledder
- Muriel Siebert (1928–2013), American businesswoman; first woman to hold a seat on the New York Stock Exchange
- Neville Siebert, New Zealand international football (soccer) player
- Sonny Siebert (born 1937), American professional baseball player
- Thomas L. Siebert (born 1946), American lawyer and diplomat; ambassador to Sweden 1994–97

== Fictional characters ==
- President Siebert
- Paul Siebert (spy)

== See also ==
- Seibert
- Seifert
- Sibert (disambiguation)
- Seiber
- Sieber (disambiguation)
- Ziebart
- Zíbrt
- Zeibert
- Žibert
