= Zibert =

Zibert may refer to:

- Žibert, Slovenian surname
- Russian-language transliteration of the German surname Siebert
- Paul Zibert, a fictional spy in a 1967 Soviet spy film Strong with Spirit partly based on real story of soviet spy with false name Paul Zibert.
