= Ziebart (disambiguation) =

Ziebart is a German-language surname, a variant of Siebert.

Ziebart may also refer to:

- Ziebart International Corporation, USA
- Kurt Ziebart (1920–2011), founder of Ziebart Corp.
- Wolfgang Ziebart (born 1950), German engineer and entrepreneur
- Wolfgang Ziebart (karate), German karateka of 1970s
