= Günter Siebert =

Günter Siebert may refer to:

- Günter Siebert (footballer) (1930–2017), German footballer
- Günter Siebert (weightlifter) (born 1931), German weightlifter
