= Seibert (disambiguation) =

Seibert is a surname of German origin.

Seibert may also refer to:

- Seibert, Colorado, statutory town in Kit Carson County, Colorado, United States
- Seibert Hall, multi-purpose arena in Homewood, Alabama, United States
- Seibert Stadium, Homewood, Alabama, United States
- Seibert Straughn, retired Barbadian sprinter
- Seibert Hall of Selinsgrove Hall and Seibert Hall, historic educational buildings located on the campus of Susquehanna University in Selinsgrove in Snyder County, Pennsylvania
- Seibert Lake (Alberta), Canada
