= Artie Fields =

American songwriter (1922–2009)

- Birth name: Arthur Fields
- Born: April 13, 1922; Brooklyn, New York, United States
- Died: October 14, 2009 (aged 87); West Bloomfield, Michigan, United States
- Genres: Jazz
- Occupation(s): Bandleader, songwriter, record producer, trumpeter
- Instrument: Trumpet
- Formerly of: Recorded vocalist, Kris Peterson in the late '60's including international hits, Mama's Little Baby (is a big girl now", and "Just as Much" written by Mike & Gwen Terry

Arthur Fields (April 13, 1922 – October 14, 2009) was an American bandleader, songwriter, record producer and jazz trumpeter.

== Biography ==
Fields was born in Brooklyn, New York, United States. After his family moved to Ann Arbor, Michigan, and then later to Dearborn, Michigan, he attended Cass Technical High School in Detroit and began playing music locally. In the late 1950s, he led an orchestra at Detroit's Fortune Records. In 1967, he opened Artie Fields Productions in the old Alhambra Theater at 9428 Woodward Avenue in Detroit as well as Top Dog Records, located in the same building.

Fields died in West Bloomfield, Michigan on October 14, 2009, at age 87.

== Recordings ==
Fields recorded songs in the 1970s for several American pop bands, as well as other recording artists, including the MC5, Parliament-Funkadelic, the Ohio Players, In early '69, the Rationals began sessions for their first LP the Detroit Emeralds, the Fantastic Four, Don Rondo, and Larry Santos. He also recorded the vocals for the 1973 Gladys Knight #1 hit single "Midnight Train To Georgia". Fields wrote and recorded the 1968 World Series Champion Detroit Tigers theme song "Go Get Em, Tigers" (sung by Don Rondo and Kris Peterson). Fields also wrote and recorded the famous Ziebart "It's Us, Or Rust" jingle (sung by Don Rondo). Fields died in West Bloomfield, Michigan on October 14, 2009, at age 87.
