= Seibert =

Seibert is a surname of German origin. It comes from the German personal name Seibert, which was formed from Old High German sigu/Old Saxon *sigi, meaning victory, and Old High German beraht/Old Saxon berht, meaning bright. The "g" was dropped and the first vowel became a diphthong. There are 3495 people with this surname in Germany, mostly in the west of the country. Variants include Siegbert, Siebert, Siepert, Seiberth, Saibert and Zeiberts.

== List of people surnamed Seibert ==
- Austin Seibert (born 1997), American football player
- Donald Seibert (1922–2003), American college football coach
- Earl Seibert (1910–1990), Canadian professional ice hockey player
- Florence B. Seibert (1897–1991), American biochemist
- Fred Seibert (born 1951), American television producer
- Kurt Seibert (born 1955), American baseball player
- Lloyd Seibert (1889–1972), American soldier; recipient of the Medal of Honor for action in World War I
- Margo Seibert (born 1984), American actress
- Mark Seibert (born 1960), American musician; composer of music for video games
- Michael Seibert (born 1960), American champion figure skater
- Oliver Seibert (1881–1944), Canadian ice hockey player
- Pete Seibert (1924–2002), American founder of Vail Ski Resort
- Robert Seibert (1941–2021), American professor of political science and political commentator
- Simon Seibert (1857–1917), New York politician
- Steffen Seibert (born 1960), German journalist and press secretary of the Chancellor's office

== See also ==
- Seibert Straughn, retired Barbadian sprinter
