= Two Different Worlds =

Two Different Worlds may refer to:

- "Two Different Worlds" (1956 song), a song co-written in 1956 by Sid Wayne and Al Frisch
- "Two Different Worlds", a song by LL Cool J from his 1989 album Walking with a Panther
