= White Silver Sands =

Single by Don Rondo
- B-side: "Stars Fell on Alabama"
- Released: June 1957
- Recorded: 1957
- Genre: Traditional pop
- Length: 2:39
- Label: Jubilee
- Songwriter(s): Charles 'Red' Matthews

Don Rondo singles chronology
"To Belong" (1957)	"White Silver Sands" (1957)	"Forsaking All Others" (1957)

"White Silver Sands" is a popular song. The words and music were written in 1957 by Charles "Red" Matthews, although partial authorship is also claimed by Gladys Reinhart.

The song was a hit for Don Rondo in the summer of 1957, and peaked at number 7 on the Billboard Charts. An uptempo tune, it was Rondo's second hit, and a contrast to the ballads he had recorded up to that point. On Canada's CHUM Chart's the song reached number 5.

== Other charting versions ==
- Bill Black's Combo rendition reached number 9 in 1960 in the Billboard Pop Chart, number 1 on the R&B chart, and number 16 in Canada.
- Sonny James' 1972 recording reached number 5 on the U.S. Billboard Hot Country Singles chart, and number 2 in Canada.
