= Sibert =

Sibert may refer to:

== People ==
- Edwin L. Sibert (1897–1977), U.S. Army major general
- Franklin C. Sibert (1891–1980), U.S. Army major general
- Jordan Sibert (born 1992), American basketball player
- Paul Siefert (1586–1666), also spelled Sibert, German composer and organist
- Sam Sibert (born 1949), American basketball player
- William L. Sibert (1860–1935), U.S. Army major general

== Places ==
- Sibert, Haiti, a village
- Sibert, Kentucky, United States, a coal town
- Sibert Lake, Waseca County, Minnesota, United States
- Camp Sibert, Alabama, a U.S. Army chemical weapons training facility

== Other uses ==
- Sibert Medal for most distinguished informational book for children

== See also ==
- one of the two Wyandotte Caves, Indiana, United States, also called Siberts Cave
- Sigebert
