= Kurt Ziebart =

German-born American inventor

Kurt Ziebart (27 July 1920 – 12 September 2011) was a German-born American who is best known for inventing the rustproofing process for automobiles.

== Early years ==
Ziebart was born on 27 July 1920 in West Prussia, Germany, before it became part of Poland. He served in the German Army during World War II. After the war, Ziebart became an auto mechanic before coming to the United States in 1953. He landed in Detroit, where he worked at a Packard factory outlet that housed several auto dealerships.

== Rustproofing ==
It was while working in a Detroit body shop that Ziebart saw the effects of rust and began looking for a way to protect cars against it. That is when he developed the process to rust proof automobiles. The process is often called "Ziebart-ing" or "Ziebart-ed", the generic term for rustproofing.

in 1959, he founded Auto Rustproofing Company with two other investors, and opened the first shop in Detroit on Harper Avenue. The company's first franchise was sold in 1962.

== Later years ==
In 1963, Kurt Ziebart sold his rustproofing company to an investor group. He also sold the rights to the name Ziebart which he registered with the company's trademark, a helmet and shield design. In addition, he sold the rights to the exclusive tooling designed by Ziebart. By 2011, the company he had founded, now called Ziebart International, had grown to over 400 shops in 30 countries.

== Death ==
Kurt Ziebart died at his home in Williamsburg, Michigan on 12 September 2011. He was 91. No cause was given.
