= Strong with Spirit =

Strong with Spirit (Сильные духом)
- Directed by: Viktor Georgiyev
- Written by: Anatoli Grebnev; Aleksandr Lukin
- Starring: Gunārs Cilinskis; Ivan Pereverzev; Yevgeni Vesnik; Lyusyena Ovchinnikova; Yuri Solomin
- Production company: Sverdlovsk Film Studio
- Release date: 1967
- Running time: 192 minutes
- Country: Soviet Union
- Language: Russian
- Box office: First part was viewed by 55.2 million and the second part by 54.6 million

Strong with Spirit (Russian: Сильные духом, romanized: Silnye dukhom) is a 1967 Soviet spy film directed by Viktor Georgiyev based on a screenplay by Anatoli Grebnev and Aleksandr Lukin. It tells the story of the Soviet intelligence officer Nikolai Kuznetsov. The picture was the 26th most attended domestic film in the Soviet Union.

== Plot ==
The film is about the Soviet intelligence officer Nikolai Ivanovich Kuznetsov.

== Cast ==
- Gunārs Cilinskis as Nikolai Kuznetsov / Paul Zibert (dubbed by Aleksandr Belyavsky)
- Ivan Pereverzev as Dmitry Medvedev
- Yevgeni Vesnik as Voronchuk, agent
- Lyusyena Ovchinnikova as Galya
- Yuri Solomin as Mayor Gettel
- Vija Artmane as Lidia Lisovskaya
- Victoria Fyodorova as Valentina Dovger
- Aleksandr Galevsky as Prikhodko
- Yuri Bogolyubov as Belotinsky
- Yuri Volkov as Ortel
- Daniil Netrebin as mayor
- Paul Butkevich as Kaminsky
- Andrei Fajt as count Gran
- Pyotr Sobolevsky as hauptmann
- Anatoli Romashin as ober-lieutenant (dubbed by Oleg Golubitsky)
