= Sieber =

Sieber may refer to:

- Sieber (surname)
- Sieber (river), a river in the Harz mountains of Germany
- Sieber (Herzberg am Harz), a village in Lower Saxony, Germany
- Sozialwerke Pfarrer Sieber, a Swiss charity and relief organization founded by Pastor Ernst Sieber
