= Sieber (surname) =

Sieber is a German surname. Notable people with the surname include:

- Al Sieber (1843–1907), German-American chief of scouts
- Bodo Sieber (born 1979), German rugby player
- Caroline Sieber (born 1982), Austrian fashion stylist
- Christoph Sieber (born 1971), Austrian sailor
- Christopher Sieber (born 1969), American actor
- Ernst Sieber (1927–2018), Swiss pastor and politician
- Fiona Sieber (born 2000), German chess master
- Franz Sieber (1789–1844), German botanist
- Günter Sieber (1930–2006), German politician
- Josef Sieber (1900-1962), German film actor
- Lothar Sieber (1922–1945), German test pilot
