= Stryzhavka =

Rural settlement in Vinnytsia Oblast, Ukraine

- Rural settlement
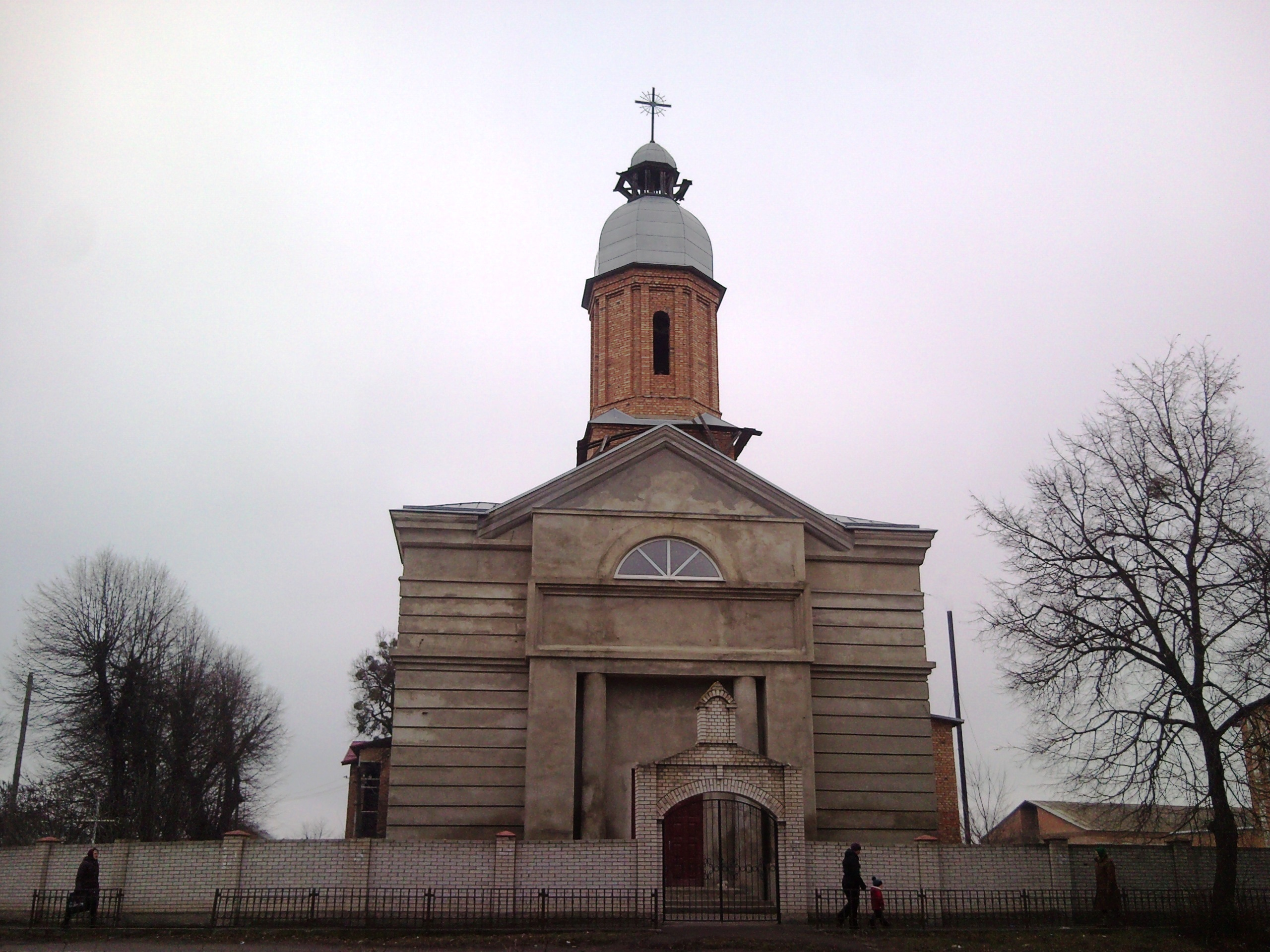

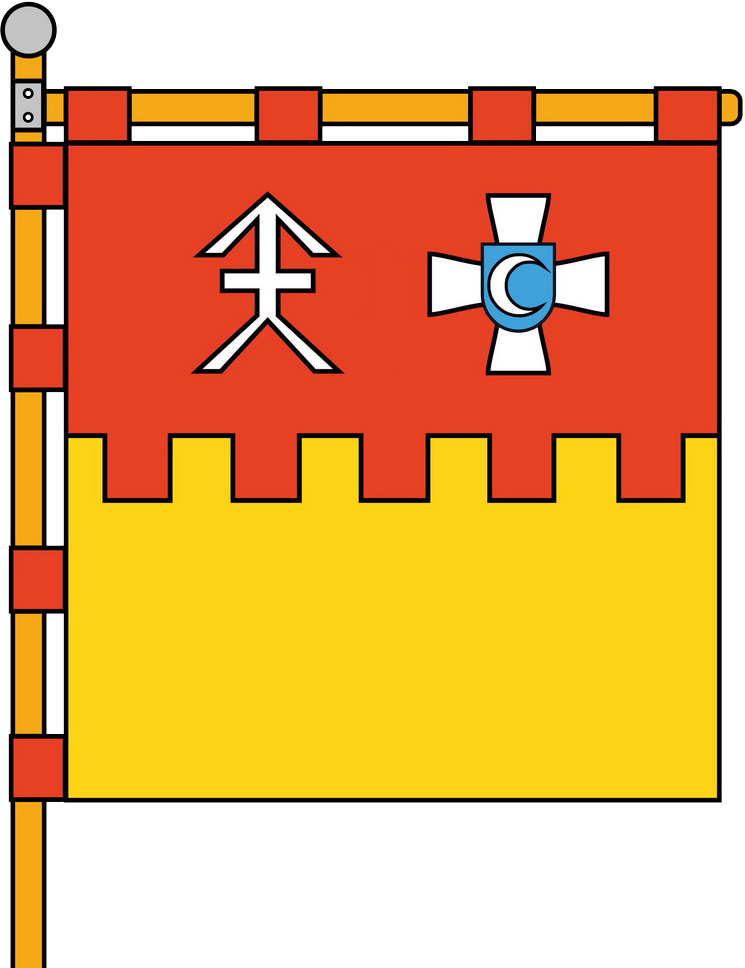
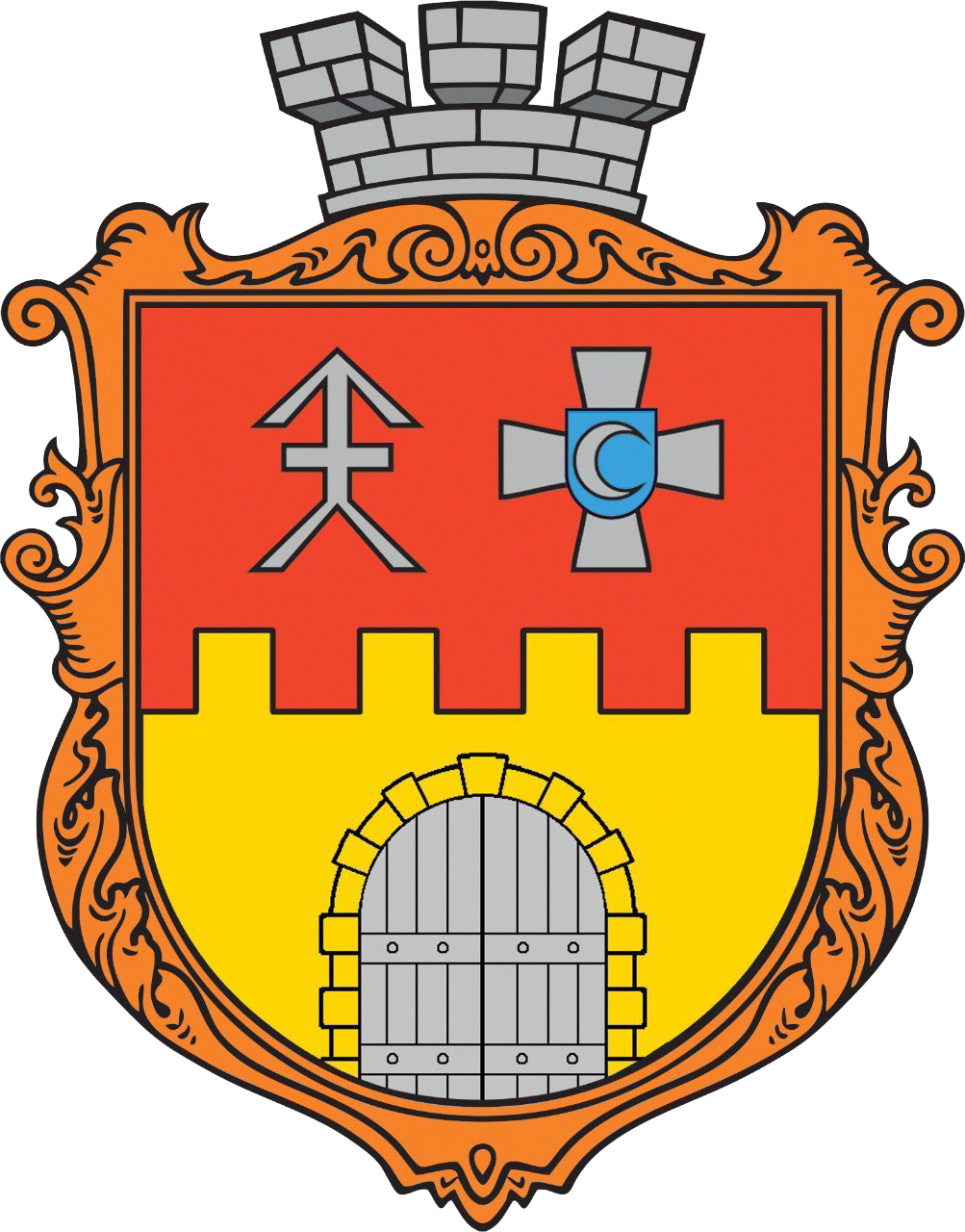
- Flag Coat of arms

- Location within Vinnytsia Oblast Location within Ukraine
- Coordinates: 49.3103°N 28.4808°E
- Country: Ukraine
- Oblast: Vinnytsia Oblast
- District: Vinnytsia Raion
- Founded: 1552

Population (2022)
  - Total: 9,000
- Time zone: UTC+2 (EET)
  - Summer (DST): UTC+3 (EEST)

Stryzhavka (Ukrainian: Стрижавка, Polish: Strzyżawka, Russian: Стрижавка) is a rural settlement in Vinnytsia Oblast, Ukraine, located in the historic region of Podolia. The population is 9,000 (2022 estimate)

== History ==
The town is founded in 1552. Until the Partitions of Poland it was part of the Bracław Voivodeship of the Lesser Poland Province of the Polish Crown. Polish nobleman Michał Grocholski founded a Classicist palace in Strzyżawka, destroyed in 1918.

Before the war, there was a significant Jewish population.

On January 10, 1942, 227 Jews from the village are murdered by an Einsatzgruppen. The next day, 12 Jews are also shot in a mass execution. A memorial is built on the site of the massacre.

In June 1942, the Werwolf (Wehrmacht HQ) is built with forced labor.

Until 26 January 2024, Stryzhavka was designated urban-type settlement. On this day, a new law entered into force which abolished this status, and Stryzhavka became a rural settlement.

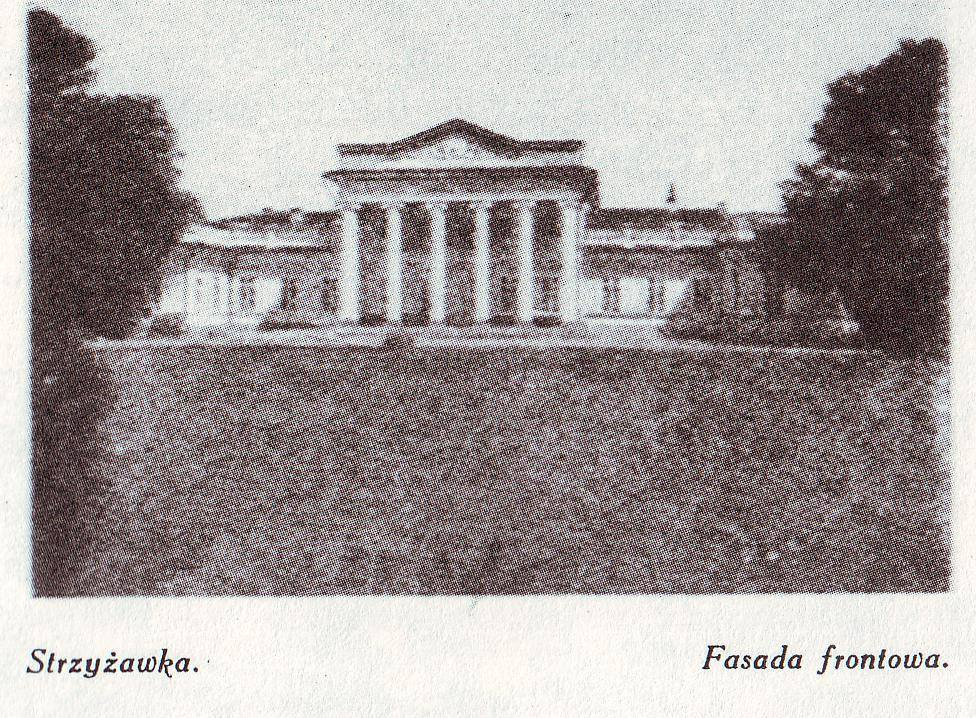
Grocholski Palace (demolished)
