= Dmitry Medvedev (partisan) =

Soviet Russian partisan leader

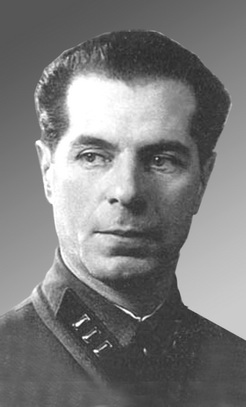
- Born: August 22, 1898; Bryansk, Oryol Governorate, Russian Empire
- Died: December 14, 1954 (aged 56); Moscow, Russian SFSR, Soviet Union
- Military career
- Allegiance: Soviet Union
- Branch: NKVD
- Rank: Colonel
- Awards: Hero of the Soviet Union
- Other work: Writer

Dmitry Nikolayevich Medvedev (Russian: Дмитрий Николаевич Медведев; August 22, 1898 – December 14, 1954) was one of the leaders of the Soviet partisan movement in western Russia and Ukraine.

Medvedev was born in Bryansk in a steelworker's family. During the Russian Civil War he joined the Red Army and in 1920 he joined the All-Russian Communist Party (Bolsheviks). Between 1920 and 1935, he worked for the Cheka, OGPU and the NKVD in Soviet Ukraine.

In 1936 Dmitry Medvedev was sent as a NKVD intelligence agent abroad. In 1938 he returned to the Soviet Union and was appointed the head of the NKVD department of Norillag, a GULAG labor camp in Norilsk. Several months later, Medvedev was fired from NKVD officially for "unjustified closures of criminal investigations" against political prisoners of the GULAG.

In 1939 Medvedev retired and settled in the Moscow region.

In the summer of 1941, a few days after the German invasion of the Soviet Union, he was re-instated as a NKVD officer and sent to his native Bryansk region to organize underground resistance behind enemy lines. Between September 1941 and January 1942 Medvedev successfully organized guerrilla units in Bryansk, Smolensk, Oryol and Mogilev regions.

During the spring of 1942 Medvedev was given a new assignment - to organize partisan units deep behind the enemy lines in Nazi-occupied Ukraine.

In June his guerrilla unit, named Pobediteli (The Victorious), was air-dropped into Zhytomyr region of Ukraine. Between June 1942 and March 1944 Medvedev's units operated in Rivne and Lviv (in particular in Huta Pieniacka) regions and in about 120 engagements and liquidated up to 2000 German soldiers and officers including 11 generals and other high-ranking officials. The wartime activities of the Medvedev group in occupied Western Ukraine focused on sabotage, assassinations and espionage against the Wehrmacht.

On November 5, 1944 Medvedev was awarded the Hero of the Soviet Union title and the Gold Star medal.

After the war, the retired partisan became the author of several books including It Happened Near Rovno. (1948) His memoirs were dedicated to the story of his war-time partner - Soviet intelligence agent Nikolai Kuznetsov.

Dmitry Medvedev died in Moscow in 1954.

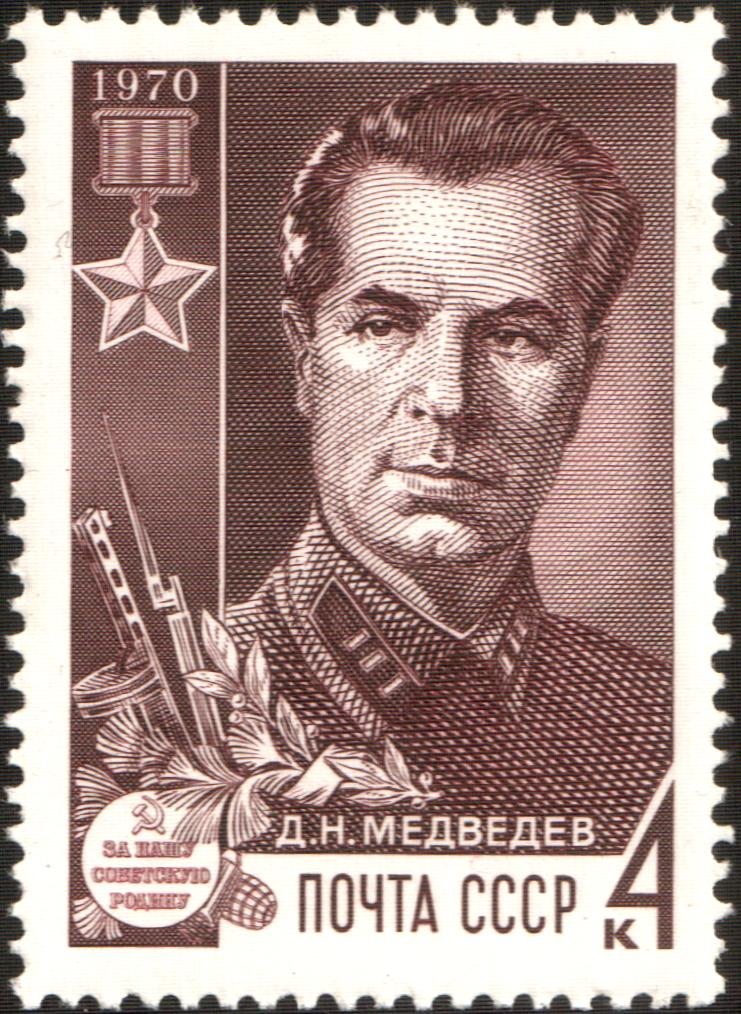
Soviet stamp depicting Medvedev.

== Honours and awards ==
- Hero of the Soviet Union
- Four Orders of Lenin
- Order of the Red Banner
- Medal "Partisan of the Patriotic War" 1st class
- Medal "For the Victory over Germany in the Great Patriotic War 1941–1945"

== Literature ==
- Dmytro Chobit. Trahediya Huty Peniats'koyi. In: Culture and Life. 2018. № 17—24, 26. (in Ukrainian)
- Dmitry Medvedev. Silnyie dukhom (Eto bylo pod Rovno). (in Russian)
