= Zeibert =

Zeibert is a Yiddish surname, a transliteration variant of the German surname Seibert. Notable people with the surname include:

- Duke Zeibert (1910–1997), proprietor of a Washington DC restaurant
- Edith Claire Zeibert, birth name of Edith Méra (1905–1935), Austrian actress
- Hanoch Zeibert, Israeli rabbi, politician and former mayor of the Israeli city of Bnei Brak.
