= Werwolf (Wehrmacht headquarters) =

One of Adolf Hitler's military headquarters on the Eastern Front

- Wehrmacht HQ
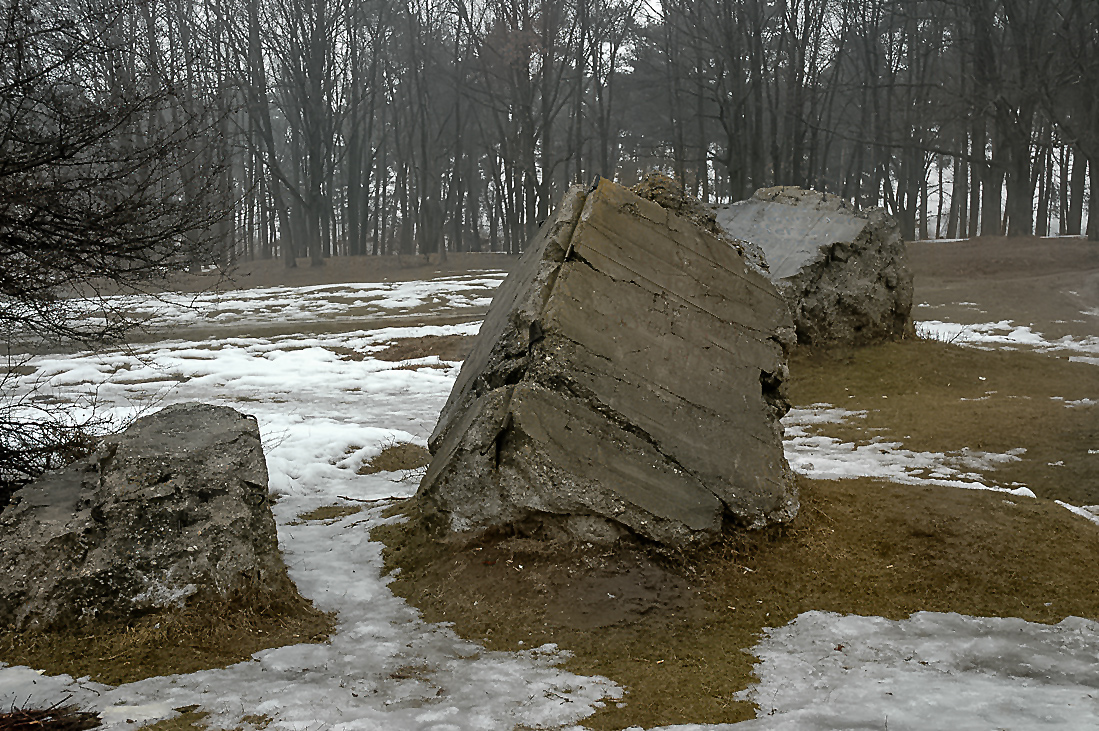
- Ruins of Hitler's headquarters Werwolf near Vinnytsia, Ukraine

- Location within Ukraine Location within the European Soviet Union

General information
- Type: Blast resistant concrete bunker
- Location: Wervolf Forest; Vinnytsia, Ukraine
- Coordinates: 49°18′30″N 28°29′36″E
- Elevation: 243 m (797 ft)
- Construction started: November 1, 1941
- Completed: June 1942
- Destroyed: March 1944
- Owner: Third Reich

Technical details
- Structural system: Steel-reinforced concrete

Design and construction
- Architecture firm: Organisation Todt

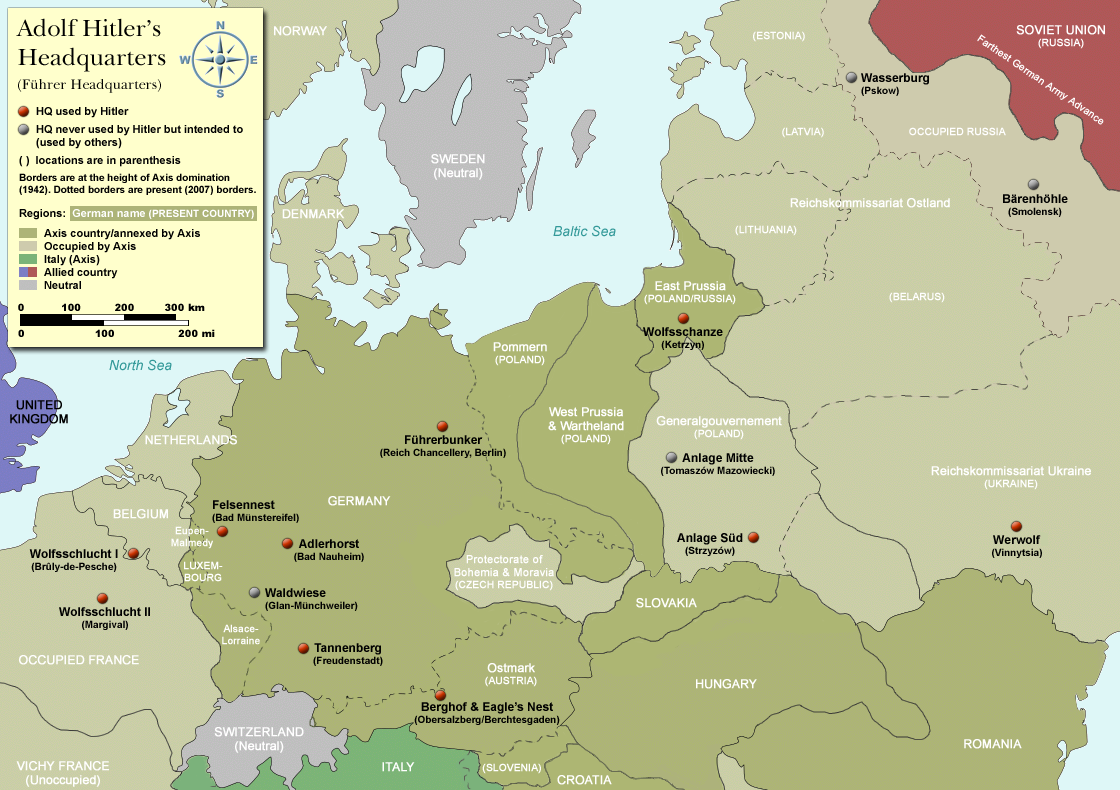
Map showing the location of "Werwolf", and other Führer Headquarters throughout Europe

Führerhauptquartier Werwolf was the codename used for one of Adolf Hitler's military headquarters on the Eastern Front during World War II. It was located in a pine forest about 12 kilometres (7 1/2 miles) north of Vinnytsia, in Ukraine, which was used between 1942 and 1943. It was one of a number of Führer Headquarters throughout Europe, and the most easterly ever used by Hitler in person.

== Naming ==
The name is derived from Werwolf or Wehrwolf in German, which can be translated as werewolf. The Nazis also used the term Werwolf as a codename for clandestine resistance groups which were intended to carry out guerrilla attacks against the occupying forces towards the end of World War II. The naming scheme is in accord with other code-names given to Führerhauptquartiere during the Second World War, such as Wolfsschanze. Several were named for Hitler himself, whose nickname was Wolf. The site was also the easternmost Wehrmacht headquarters.

== Headquarters ==
The complex was located in a pine forest about 12 kilometres (7 1/2 miles) north of Vinnytsia in Nazi-occupied Ukraine, between the villages of Stryzhavka and Kolo-Mikhailovka on the Kiev highway. It was built between December 1941 and June 1942 under top secret conditions by Soviet prisoners of war. In July 1941 the whole Vinnyts’ka oblast’ was occupied by the Nazi regime and later the entire region. Systematic warcrimes took place nearby. According to official figures, during the Nazi occupation of the region over 200,000 local civilians were killed, including 25,000 in Vinnytsia in September 1941 and April 1942. Also 1,800 psychiatric patients were shot, starved or poisoned. The Nazi regime built 18 camps for Soviet prisoners of war in the region, and several ghettos, labor camps and prisons for Jewish residents, all of whom were killed by the German occupants. Thousands of women from the Vinnytsia region were sent to forced labor camps in Germany—61,000 people were removed to be replaced by German occupants.

The location may have been influenced by the Nazis' proposed trans-European highway to the Crimean Peninsula, which would have connected with the site. The Wehrmacht had its regional headquarters in Vinnytsia, and the Luftwaffe had a strong presence at their airbase in Kalinovka, about 20 km (12 mi) away.

Hitler's accommodation at Werwolf (the Führerhaus) consisted of a modest log cabin built around a private courtyard with its own concrete bunker. The rest of the complex consisted of about 20 wooden cottages and barracks and up to three "B" class bunkers, surrounded by a ring of barbed wire and ground defensive positions connected by tunnels. A couple of observation points were set up on platforms in the oak trees surrounding the pine forest. The area was surrounded by a defensive strip of bunkers, anti-aircraft guns and tanks, as well as anti-tank ditches and minefields.

There was a tea house, a barber shop, a bathhouse, a sauna, a cinema, and a swimming pool primarily intended for Hitler who never used it. The facility also contained a large vegetable garden organised by the German horticultural company Zeidenspiner to provide Hitler with a secure supply of food. Hitler's personal chef selected his vegetables and the food was chemically analyzed before being tried by a taster because of Hitler's fear of poisoning. Oxygen tanks were also available at Hitler's insistence. Water for the site was provided by artesian wells while power was provided by a generator. Some buildings were connected by tunnels.

The bunkers were constructed by Organisation Todt using some local Ukrainian workers, but mainly Soviet prisoners of war. The code name for the secret construction project was Anlage Eichenhain (Camp Oak Grove). The 4000 forced laborers were lined up and shot when construction was finished.

The complex was served by a daily three-hour flight connection from Berlin to the airfield in Kalinovka 20 km (12 mi) from the compound. There was also a regular train connection from Berlin-Charlottenburg to "Eichenbein" station at Werwolf. The journey took 34 hours.

During Germany's Eastern campaign, Adolf Hitler lived mainly at FHQ Wolfsschanze (near Rastenburg, East Prussia) but he stayed at FHQ Werwolf three times:

- 16 July to 30 October 1942: The weather was hot, up to 37 °C (99 °F), and the bunkers were humid. Hitler caught severe influenza, with a temperature running up to 40 °C (104 °F). In this condition, he gave his fateful Führer Directive 45, splitting Army Group South into two parts in a bid to reach both Stalingrad and the Caucasian oil fields simultaneously. The Directive was the main cause of the eventual defeat and destruction of the German 6th Army at Stalingrad and the German Army's subsequent withdrawal from Southern Russia to a new front near the Soviet city of Kursk.
- 19 February to 13 March 1943: to observe Field Marshal Erich von Manstein's Kharkov offensive in the wake of Germany's defeat at Stalingrad.
- 27 August to 15 September 1943: to observe the unsuccessful defense of Kharkov.

== History ==
The Nazis destroyed the site, including mining access to the underground complex, upon abandoning the region. The site was examined after the Nazi departure in March 1944 under the orders of Joseph Stalin, but no documentation was found. The Soviet Union took steps to permanently seal the underground parts of the complex.

Today only the swimming pool and concrete fragments remain visible on the site, which is an open recreation area. The site can be visited and plans to create a full-fledged museum had come to fruition as of May 2026. Nearby is a memorial to the thousands of labourers and others buried by the Nazis in gravepits at Stryzhavka.

== Photos ==
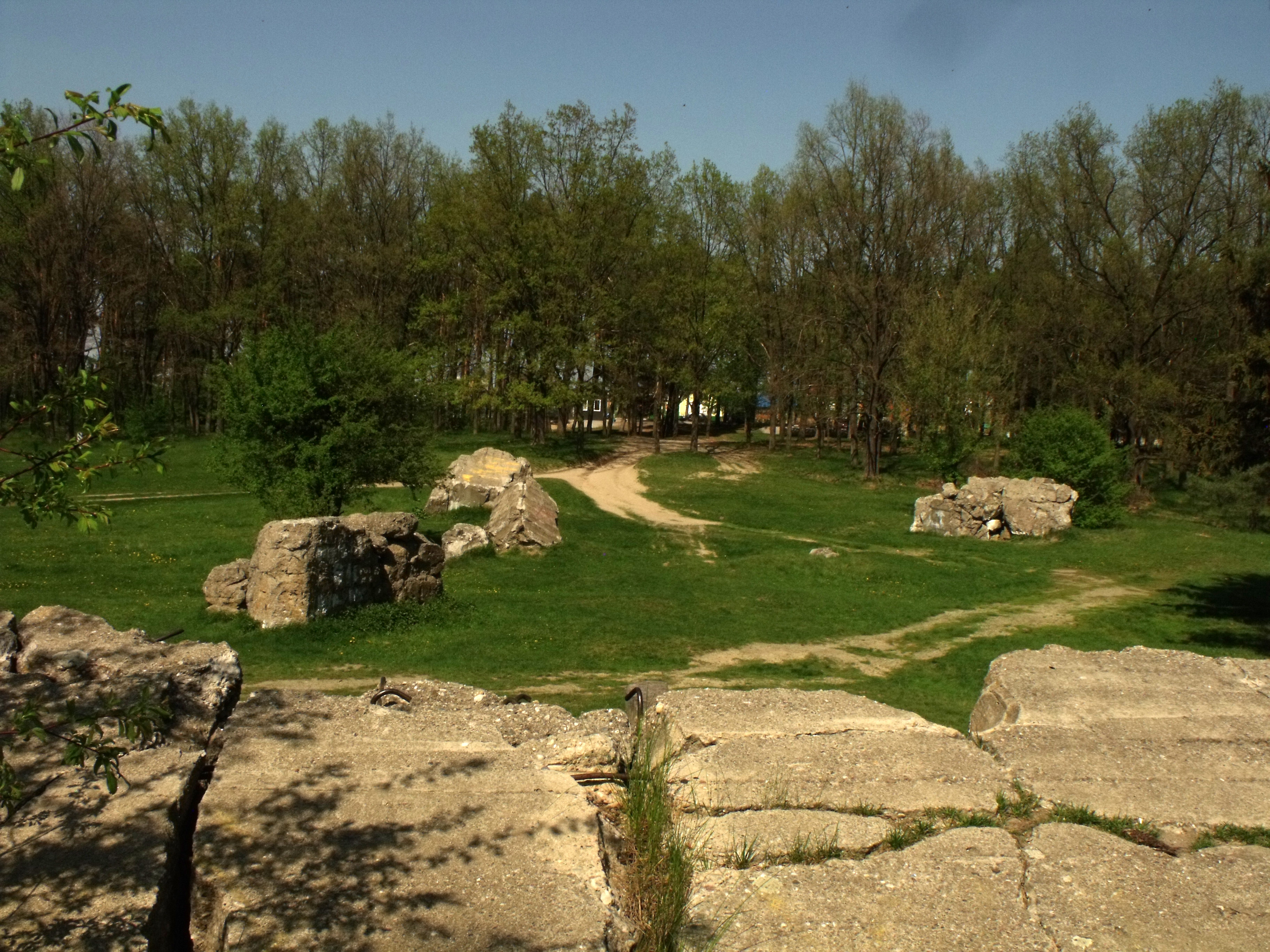

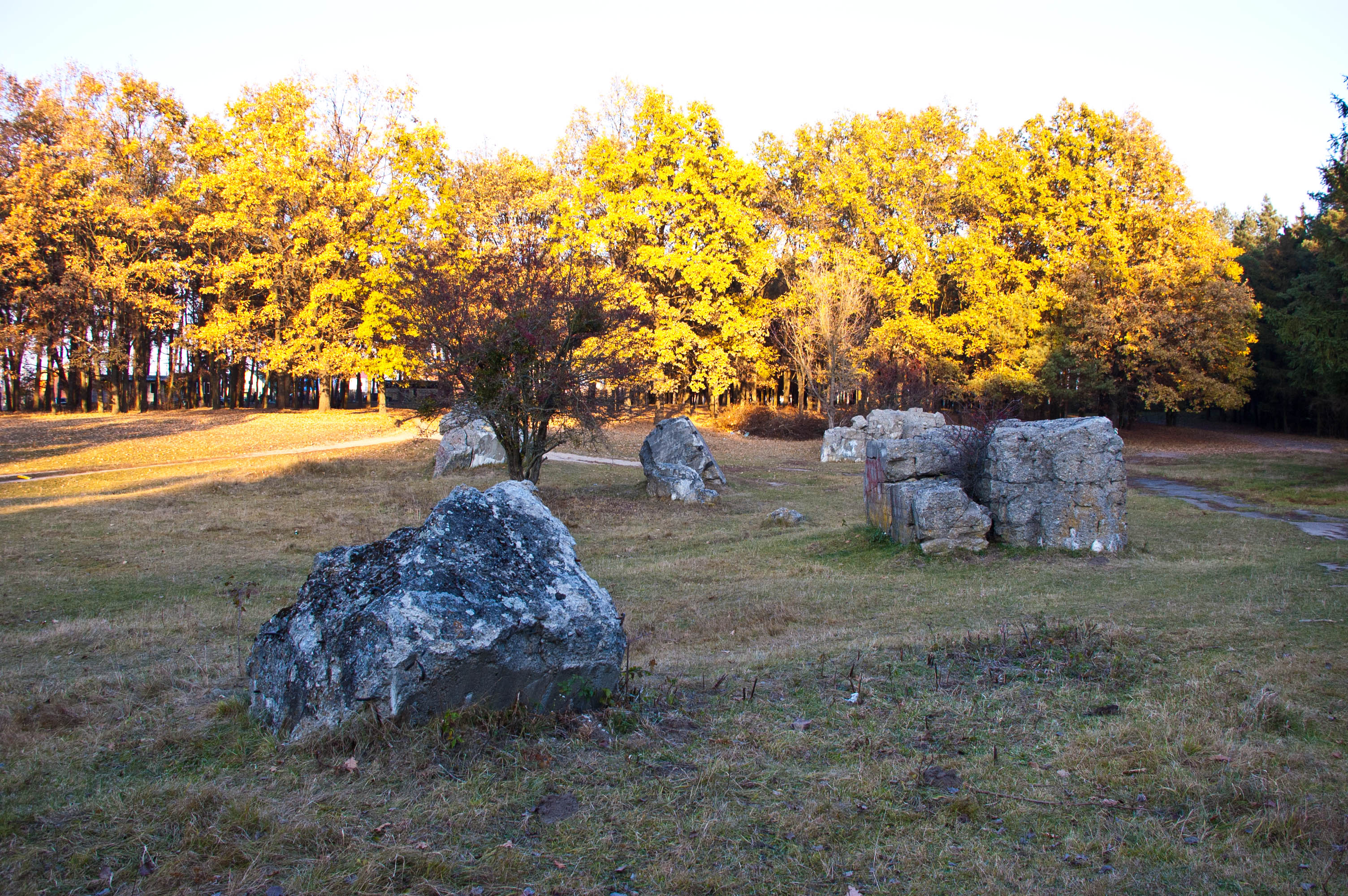

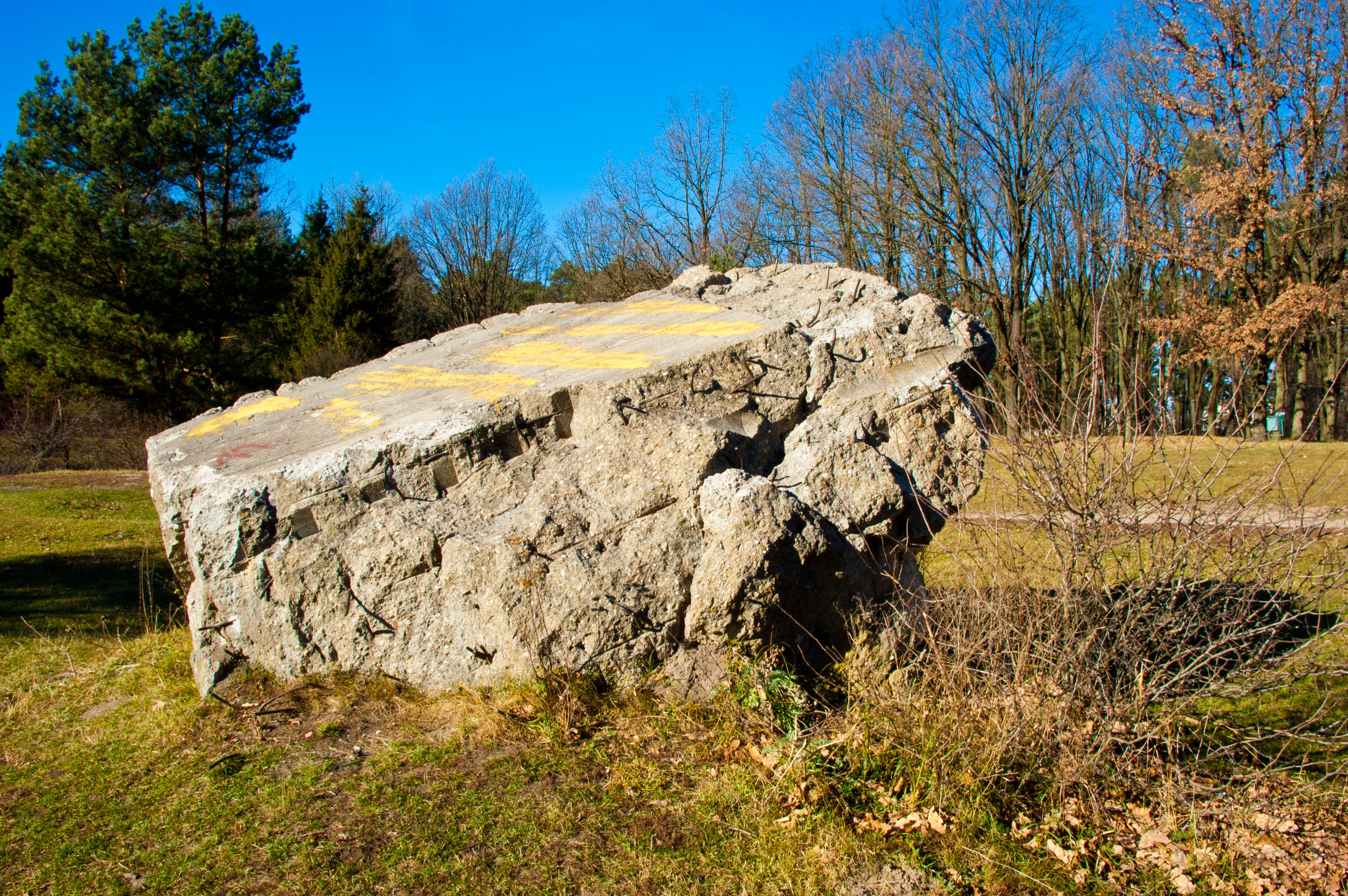

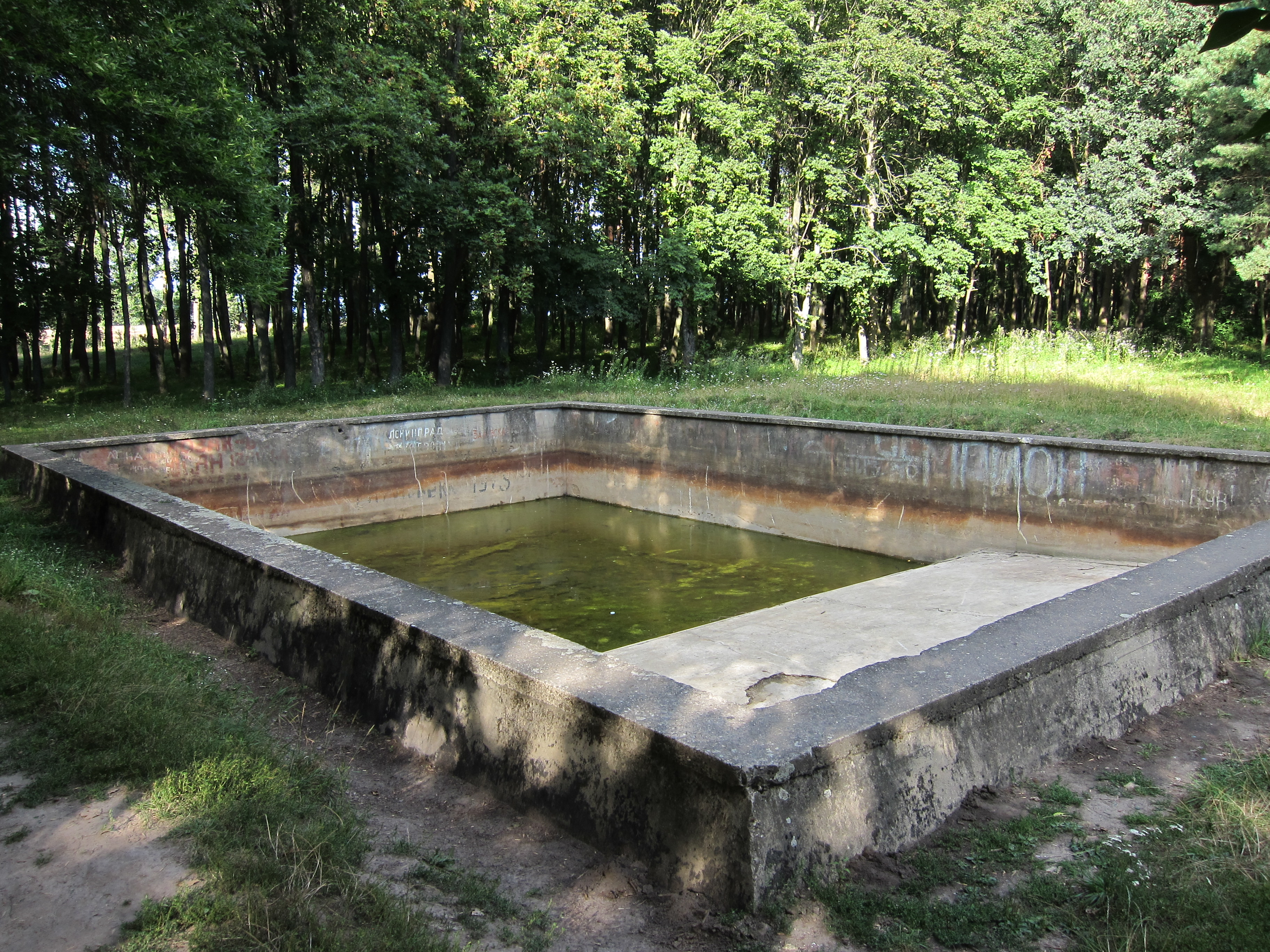
Remains of the bunker compound's swimming pool

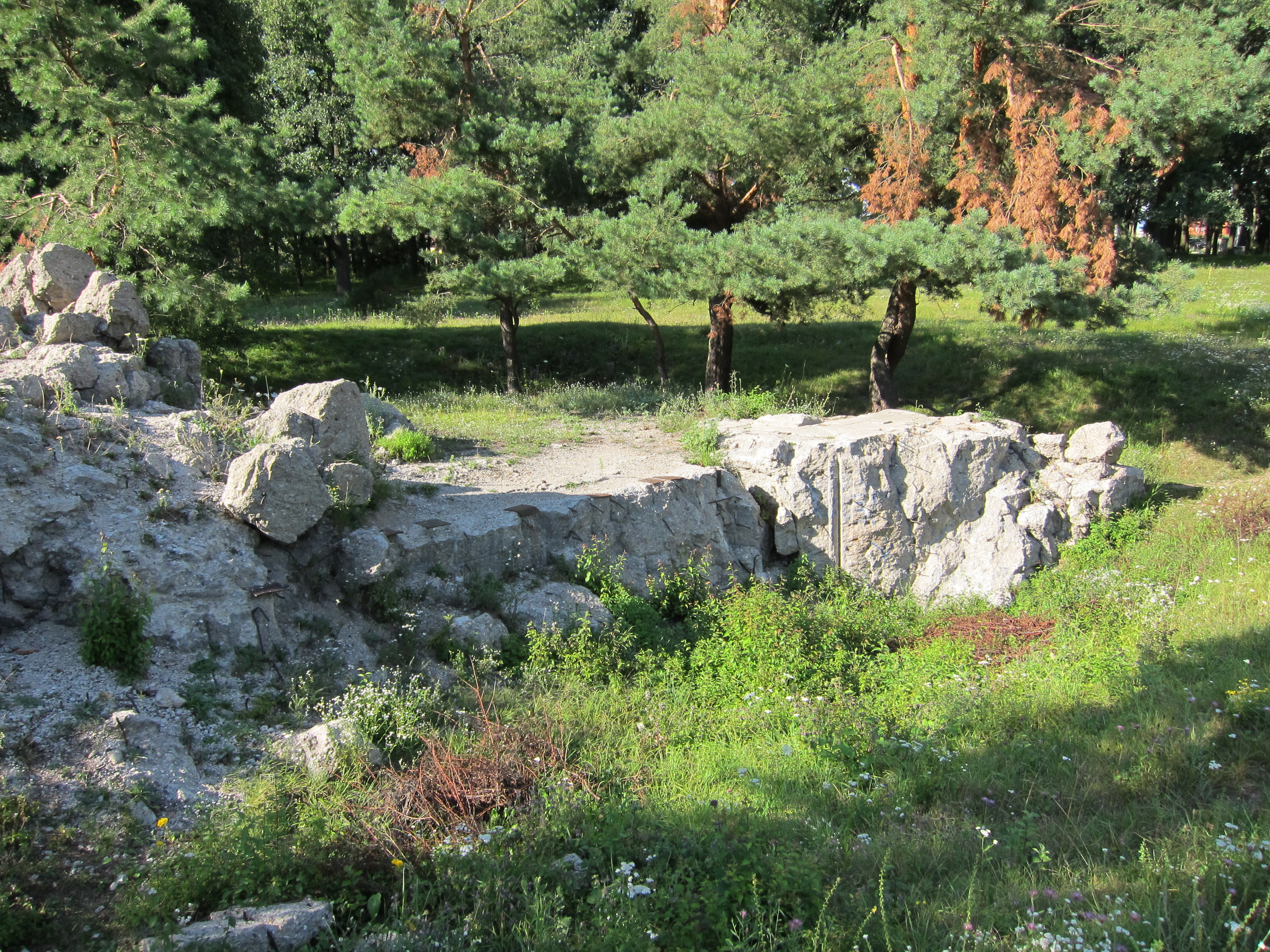

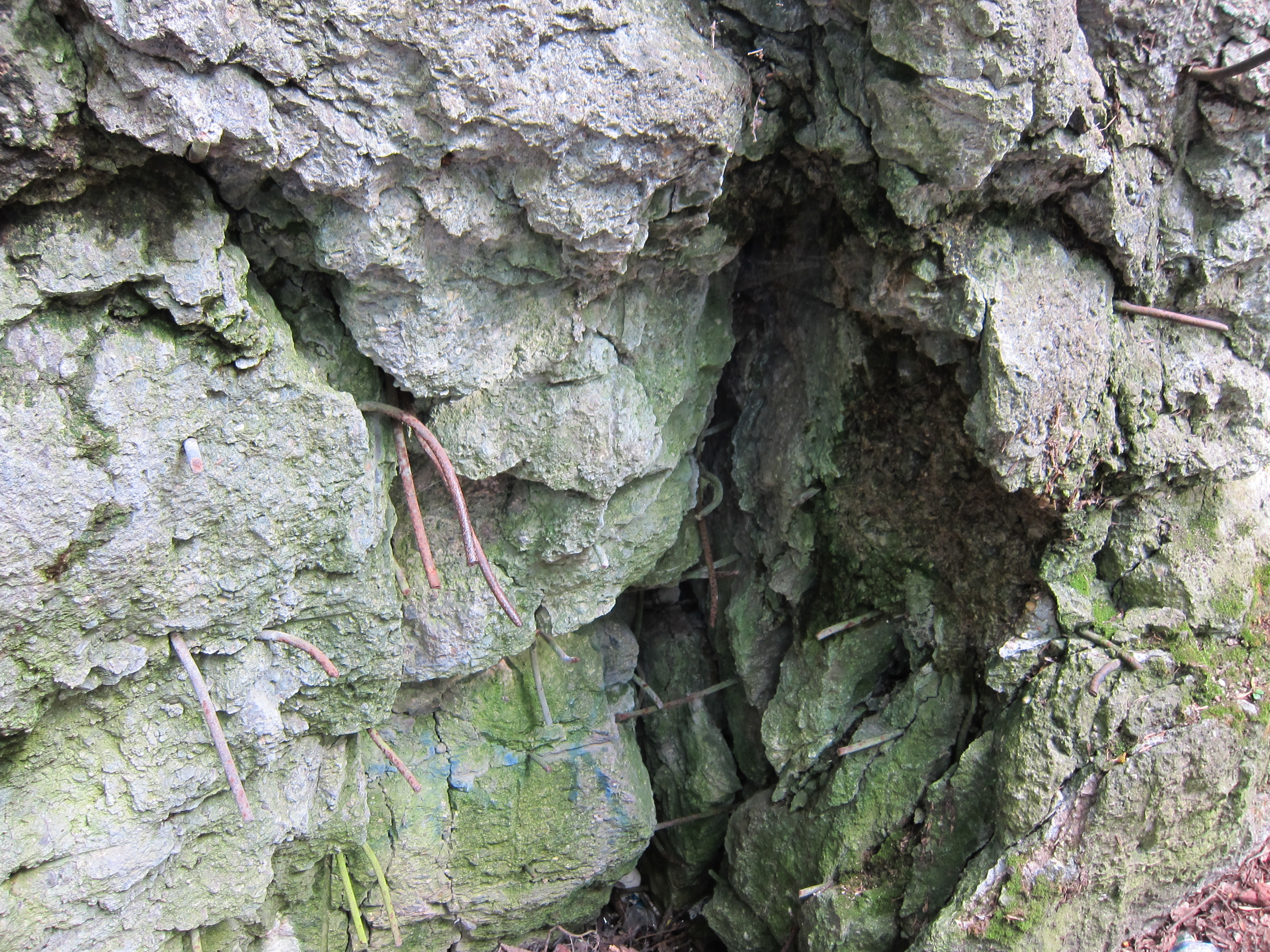

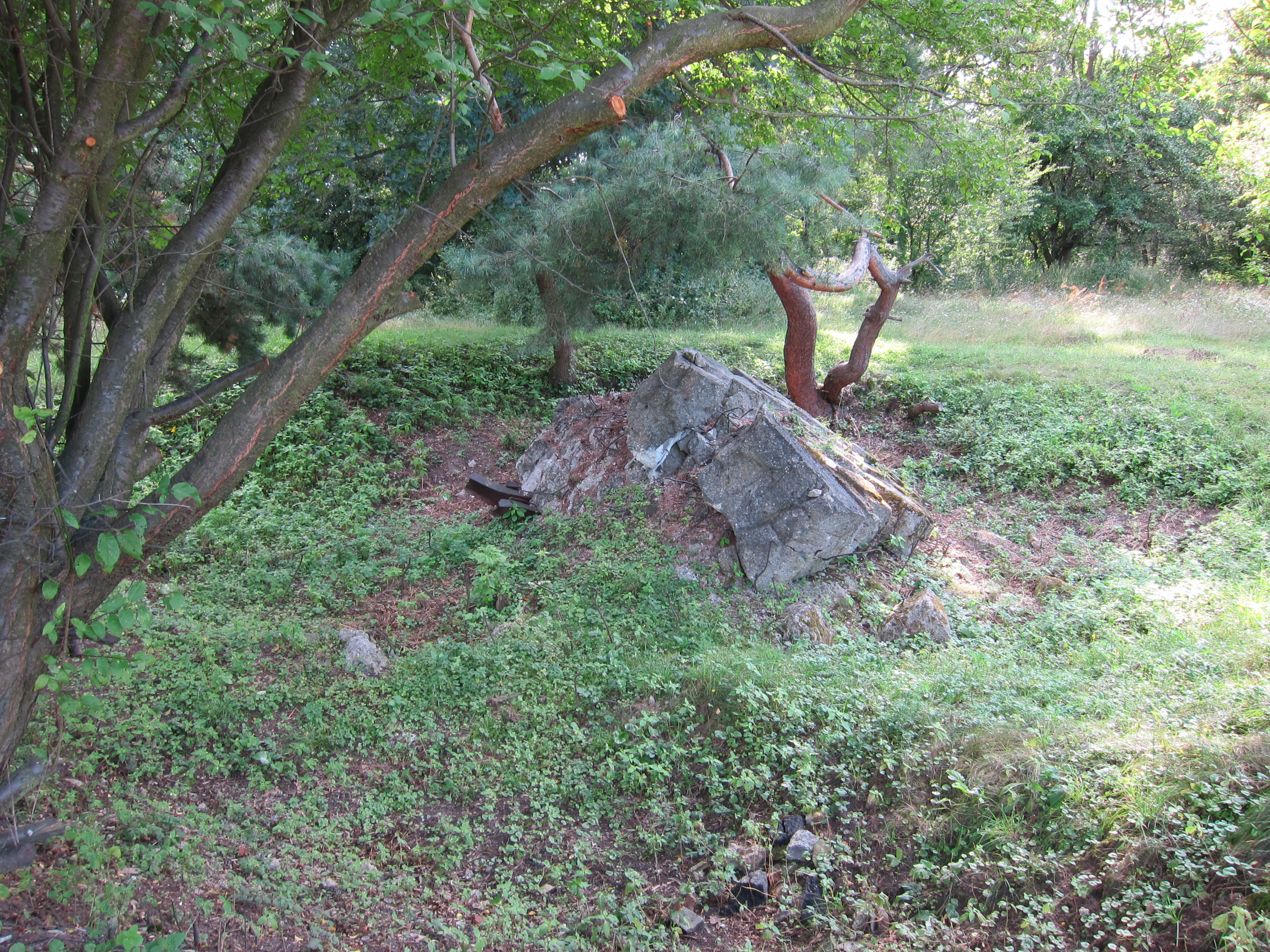

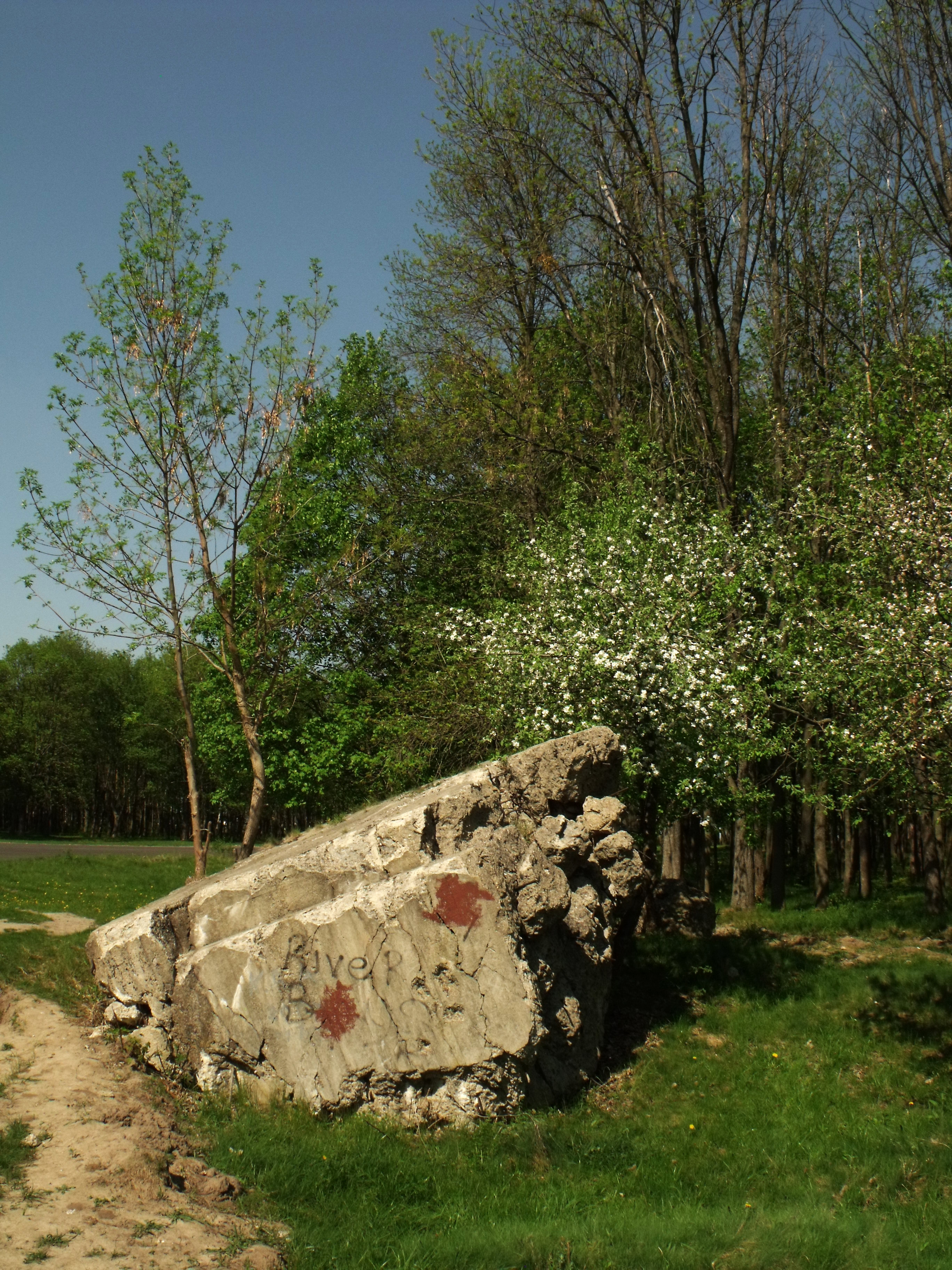

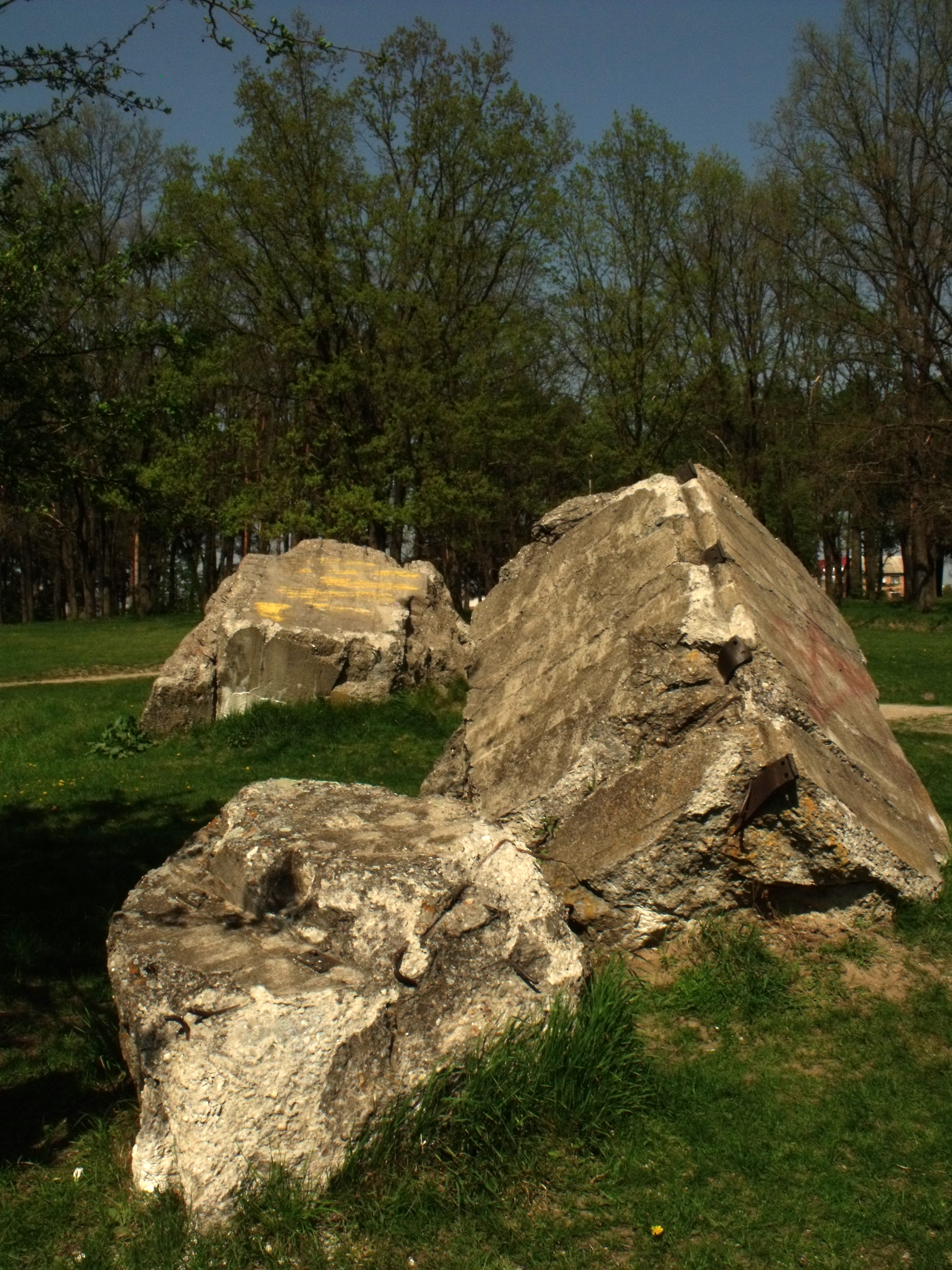

== See also ==
- Führer Headquarters

== Bibliography ==
- Zeidler, Zeigert, Die Führerhauptquartiere.
