= Siegbert =

Siegbert is the given name of:

- Siegbert Alber (1936–2021), German politician
- Siegbert Droese (born 1969), German politician
- Siegbert Einstein (1889–1968), German-Jewish politician, factory worker, civil servant, lawyer and Holocaust survivor
- Siegbert Horn (1950–2016), East German slalom canoeist
- Siegbert Hummel (1908−2001), German Tibetologist and cultural historian
- Siegbert Salomon Prawer (1925–2012), professor of German language and literature
- Siegbert Rippe (born 1936), Uruguayan lawyer and jurist
- Siegbert Schmeisser (born 1957), East German cyclist
- Siegbert Tarrasch (1862−1934), German chess player
- Siggi B. Wilzig (1926−2003), American businessman and Holocaust survivor
- Siegbert Wirth (1929–1999), American soccer player

== See also ==
- Sigebert
