= Two Different Worlds (1956 song) =

Single by Don Rondo
- B-side: "He Made You Mine"
- Released: September 1956
- Recorded: 1956
- Genre: Traditional pop
- Length: 2:47
- Label: Jubilee
- Songwriters: Al Frisch, Sid Wayne

Don Rondo singles chronology
| "Evening Star" (1956) | "Two Different Worlds" (1956) | "Don't" (1957) |

"Two Different Worlds" is a popular song with music by Al Frisch and the lyrics by Sid Wayne, published in 1956.

== Notable recordings ==
- The biggest U.S. hit version was recorded by Don Rondo. It reached number 19 on the Billboard chart and number 12 on the Cashbox chart.
- A cover version of the song was recorded by Roger Williams and Jane Morgan which reached number 41 on the Billboard chart.
- A recording by Ronnie Hilton in the same year reached number 13 on the UK Singles Chart.
- In 1965, Lenny Welch recorded the song peaking at number 6 on the Easy Listening chart and number 61 on the Hot 100.

== Other recordings ==
- Nat King Cole also recorded the song in 1956 but without chart success.
- A recording by Jerry Vale in 1963, appeared on the original Columbia album, The Language of Love.
- Sammy Davis Jr. covered the song in his 1966 album Sammy Davis Jr. Sings and Laurindo Almeida Plays
- The British pop singer Engelbert Humperdinck also covered the song on his 1967 album The Last Waltz.
- Earl Coleman recorded a version with a quartet led by Sonny Rollins. The cut appeared on Rollins's album, Tour de Force.
