= Hannes Siebert =

Hannes Siebert (February 17, 1961) is an international peace process and negotiations adviser and facilitator, who is known for his work on national peace structures, the role of media in conflict resolution, authentic negotiations processes and local/regional conflict interventions in several countries.

== Personal life ==
He was born in Port Elizabeth, South Africa in 1961. He grew up in the house of an Afrikaner Dutch Reform Minister who ministered to both white and black communities. His political turning point happened during a sequence of events from 1980 to 1984 when he worked as a railway worker to support his studies—witnessing the brutal impact of Apartheid on the lives of black migrant workers. He became a victim of a hit-and-run accident after exposing a double insurance scandal (that had fatal consequences for insured workers) and spent many months in hospital; then as reporter for the daily newspaper, Die Volksblad writing about corruption in the Dutch Reformed Church and the force removals under the Apartheid Regime; and finally as co-founder and editor of the black newspaper, City Beat.

In 1990, Hannes Siebert has been elected to the Ashoka Fellowship.

== Professional career ==
As an international peace process and negotiations adviser and facilitator, Hannes Siebert has worked in many of the world's most conflict-ridden societies. In South Africa he served as director in the National Peace Secretariat (1992-4), the multi-party body mandated to implement its 1992 Peace Accord. Post-1994 he assisted the Special Presidential Task Force in key in-tractable conflicts, focusing on de-militarization of youth militia.

In 1998, he became known as the executive producer for a Search for Common Ground TV mini-series documentary on Africa.

In Sri Lanka Hannes advised the country's peace secretariats and facilitated the creation of the multi-party negotiations forum (SL One-Text Initiative); in Nepal he co-facilitated and contributed to the drafting of key agreements – including the Comprehensive Peace Agreement, co-facilitated talks between the Nepal Army and the Maoist Army, facilitated the setting-up of the confidential dialogue process (Nepal Transitions To Peace), and advised the Peace Ministry; in the USA he facilitated talks between members from prominent Arab and Israeli think tanks; in the Balkans he worked on healing and reconciliation initiatives as part of the "Stability Pact Agreements"; in Lebanon he acted as senior advisor for the Common Space Initiative, Berghof Foundation and UN, working on issues related to sustainable peace and constitutional reform. Internationally Hannes assisted several governments with the development of strategy and policy papers for peace and negotiations support initiatives, peacebuilding, conflict interventions, and looking at best practices worldwide.

With 5 Nobel Peace Prize laureates, he initiated the establishment of the Peace Appeal Foundation in 2000 in support of their "Appeal for Peace and Non-Violence"; in 2001, as an associate and fellow at the Center for War, Peace and the News Media at NYU, he coordinated the West-Dar al Islam Media Dialogues program – facilitating dialogue between major media institutions in the West and Middle East; and in 2003 he developed Peace Tools, a comprehensive set of innovative tools for conflict transformation and negotiations processes.

== Articles and public lectures ==
- Baumann, Melissa; Siebert, Hannes (Winter 1993). "The Media as Mediator". NIDR Forum. pp. 28–32. Archived from the original on 2011-10-05.
- Siebert, Hannes (December 1998). "Debunking the 'Big O'". Track Two. 7 (4). Archived from the original on 2012-04-25.
- Siebert, Hannes (November 5, 2007) [2006]. "Sri Lanka One-Text Initiative: A Multi-Stakeholder Negotiations and Dialogue". Peace and Collaborative Development Network. Archived from the original on May 23, 2012.
- "Supporting Peace Processes: A Toolkit for Development Intervention" (PDF). United States Agency for International Development. June 2009. Archived from the original (PDF) on 2011-10-22.
- Siebert, Hannes; Charles, Chanya (Jan 18, 2009). "Sri Lanka: When Negotiations Fail... Talks for the sake of Talks, War for the sake of Peace". Peace Appeal Foundation.
- Siebert, Hannes (September 19, 2010). "Imperfect Bridges To Peace: National Peace Structures Study Nepal, South Africa, Sri Lanka, Colombia, Israel/Palestine". Berghof Foundation/ Peace Appeal.
- "Beyond Mediation: Promoting Change and Resolving Conflicts Through Authentic National Dialogue". The Bill and Sally Hambrecht Distinguished Peacemakers Lecture. American University Beirut (AUB), Issam Fares Institute for Public Policy and International Affairs. May 23, 2011.
- Siebert, Hannes (March 2013). National Peace and Dialogue Structures. Strengthening the Immune System from Within instead of Prescribing Antibiotics, Berghof Handbook Dialogue Series No. 10 (PDF). Berlin: Berghof Foundation. Archived from the original (PDF) on 2013-01-25.
