= Nikolai Kuznetsov (spy) =

Soviet partizan

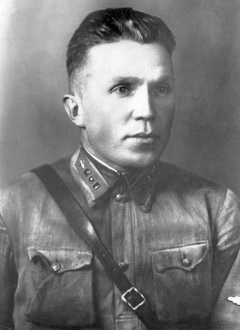
- Born: Nikanor Ivanovich Kuznetsov; 27 July 1911; Zyryanka village, Yekaterinburgsky Uyezd, Perm Governorate, Russian Empire
- Died: 9 March 1944 (aged 32); Near Brody, Reichskommissariat Ukraine
- Military career
- Allegiance: Soviet Union
- Branch: NKVD
- Service years: 1938–1944
- Rank: Senior Lieutenant
- Awards: Hero of the Soviet Union

Nikolai Ivanovich Kuznetsov (Russian: Николай Иванович Кузнецов; 27 July 1911 – 9 March 1944) was a Soviet intelligence agent and partisan who operated in Nazi-occupied Ukraine (Reichskommissariat Ukraine) during World War II and who personally killed six high-ranking German officials. It was not until 1990 that Kuznetsov was officially recognized as a NKVD agent. He used several pseudonyms during his intelligence operations: e.g. Rudolf Schmidt, Nikolai Vasilevitsh Grachov (Николай Васильевич Грачёв) and Oberleutnant Paul Siebert. Kuznetsov was posthumously awarded the title Hero of the Soviet Union.

== Biography ==
Kuznetsov was born into a peasant family of Russian ethnicity in the Yekaterinburgsky Uyezd of the Perm Governorate of the Russian Empire (present-day Sverdlovsk Oblast, Russia). He studied forestry in a technical school and, after discovering his linguistic talents, learned the German, Esperanto, Polish, Ukrainian and Mordvinic languages (particularly Erzya language). In 1926, at age 15, Kuznetsov enrolled at Tyumen Agricultural College but did not finish and was forced to return home because of the death of his father. During that time Kuznetsov joined the ranks of the Komsomol. At home he enrolled in the local forestry college but in 1929 Kuznetsov was accused of having counter-revolutionary origins and excluded from Komsomol and the college. After moving in 1930 to Kudymkar (Komi-Permyak Autonomous Okrug) Kuznetsov was recruited by the local department of the OGPU. In 1932 he enrolled into Sverdlovsk Industrial Institute and continued to study German and other foreign languages.

In 1938 Kuznetsov moved to Moscow and joined the NKVD, his tasks included posing as a Volga German and collecting intelligence about German diplomats in Moscow.

When Germany invaded the Soviet Union Kuznetsov, at his own request, was sent to join Soviet partisan units in the Nazi-occupied Ukraine. In 1942, the same year he became a member of the Communist Party, he fought as a member of the guerrilla group "Victors", led by Dmitry Medvedev, in central and western Ukraine. Kuznetsov was in charge of several complex operations involving assassinations and kidnappings of high-ranking Nazi officials in the Rivne and Lviv regions, such as successful operations against the German-appointed chief judge of Ukraine, the vice-governor of Galicia, the adviser to the Reichskommissar of Ukraine, three German generals and others. Kuznetsov was also the first intelligence agent to uncover German plans to launch a massive tank attack in the Kursk region, and information about German V-2 rockets, as well as about Operation Long Jump, Hitler's alleged plan to assassinate the heads of the USSR, USA and Great Britain during the Tehran Conference. Kuznetsov was operating in Rivne (the capital of Reichskommissariat Ukraine) using the fake German identity of Oberleutnant Paul Siebert. It was Kuznetsov who obtained information about the location of Hitler's "Werwolf" headquarters, near the city of Vinnitsya.

According to a report submitted by Josef Witiska to Heinrich Müller (and cited by D. Medvedev in his memoir about Kuznetsov), "Paul Siebert" and his accomplices were detained and shot by the Ukrainian Insurgent Army, which then informed SS-Obergruppenführer Hans-Adolf Prützmann about the incident. According to official Soviet version, Kuznetsov was killed in a firefight with members of the Ukrainian Insurgent Army near the city of Brody on 9 March 1944. In another version by the Ukrainian Insurgent Army, Kuznetsov and his associates were detained in the village of Boratyn near Brody, dressed as German soldiers. To avoid being discovered, Kuznetsov blew himself up with a grenade.

Kuznetsov is currently buried in Lviv, Ukraine. Since 2003, several unsuccessful attempts have been made to rebury him in Russia. A 2007 attempt was stopped by the Russian Foreign Ministry, which claimed that "such a move would open a kind of Pandora’s box and give Ukrainian nationalists a reason to launch a campaign to transfer other graves of Soviet soldiers buried in Ukraine." A 2018 attempt was prevented by the Lviv authorities, who claimed that such a reburial could not be considered while Ukrainian prisoners were being held captive in Russia during an ongoing Russian military intervention in Ukraine.

== Legacy ==
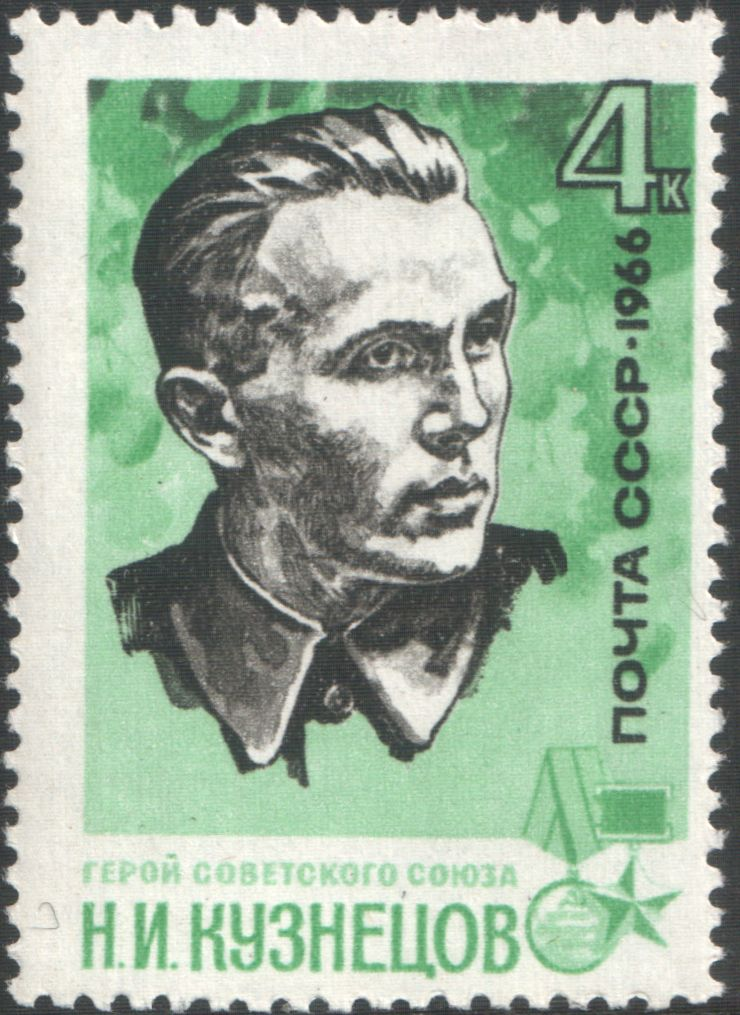
Soviet 1966 postage stamp honoring Kuznetsov

Nikolai Ivanovich Kuznetsov has been posthumously awarded the honorary title of Hero of the Soviet Union. Minor planet 2233 Kuznetsov, discovered in 1972 by Soviet astronomer Lyudmila Zhuravlyova, is named after him. Kuznetsovsk, a city in Volhynia, was named after the Soviet agent (renamed in 2016 to Varash conforming to a law prohibiting names of Communist origin).

=== Films about Kuznetsov ===
- Strong with Spirit («Сильные духом»)
- Special Operations Squad («Отряд специального назначения»)
- Genius of the intelligence («Гений разведки»)
- Saboteurs (2012) («Диверсанты (2012)»)

Kuznetsov's story was allegedly an inspiration for the Polish TV series More than Life at Stake and the Russian TV series Seventeen Moments of Spring, both of which narrated the exploits of agents who successfully infiltrated Nazi armed forces during World War II.

== Kuznetsov's targets ==
Kuznetzov's main target, Nazi Party official Erich Koch, survived World War II and outlived his Soviet "nemesis", dying of old age in a Polish prison in 1986 at the age of 90.

- On 20 September 1943: the head of the financial department of the Reichskommissariat Ukraine, Ministerialrat (councilor of the ministry) Hans Gehl, and the Inspector General of Commissariat of the Rovno region, Adolf Winter, shot in the street in Rivne.
- On 15 November 1943: the chief of the Eastern Troops 740, Major General Max Iigen, abducted from his quarters in Rivne under the supervision and with the direct involvement of Kuznetsov. Along with Ilgen, Kuznetsov and his accomplices captured Paul Granau, driver of Gauleiter Erich Koch, who was an accidental witness. Both were executed shortly after interrogation.
- On 16 November 1943: Senate president Oberfuhrer Alfred Funk, shot at the courthouse in Rovno.
- On 9 February 1944: Deputy Governor of Galicia District, Otto Bauer, and his secretary Heinrich Schneider, shot outside their quarters in Lviv.

According to the Ukrainian Institute of National Remembrance Kuznetzov "carried out provocations against the Ukrainian liberation movement, as a result of which the Nazi invaders executed hostages".

Colonel Dmitry Medvedev, who oversaw Kuznetsov's activities, repeatedly attributes him discovery of a planned Nazi operation against the Tehran Conference of Allied leaders. However, this version is not accepted by historians due to apparent controversy. He also mentions occasional killing of other middle-ranked Nazi officers by Kuznetsov, of which the last victim, major Kanter of Feldgendarmerie, shot at the checkpoint while Kuznetsov was trying to escape from Lviv, is mentioned in the SS report about Kuznetsov's death.

=== Unsuccessful attempts ===
- 20 April 1943 – Erich Koch
- Summer 1943 – Erich Koch
- 5 June 1943 – Alfred Rosenberg
- 30 September 1943 – Paul Dargel
