= Don Rondo =

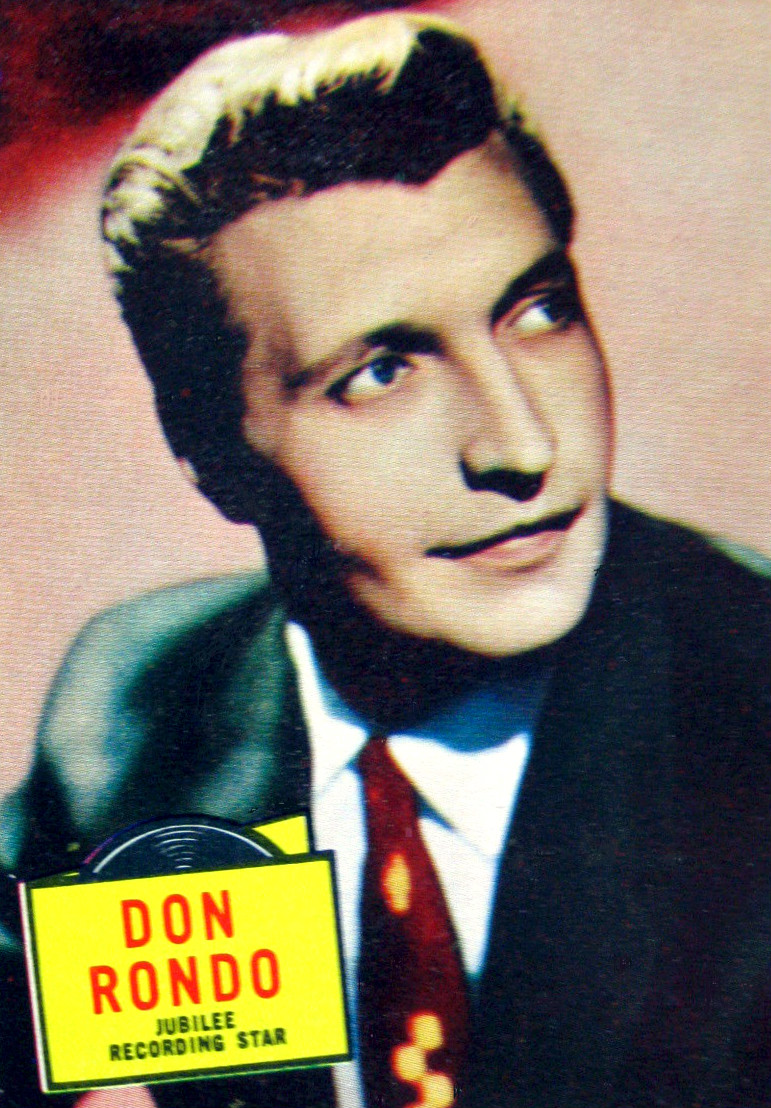
- Rondo in 1957
- Born: Donald T. Rondeau; January 5, 1930; Ware, Massachusetts
- Died: January 27, 2011 (aged 81); Contoocook, New Hampshire
- Occupations: Singer, broadcaster
- Spouses: Ida Mae Bousquet
- Children: 3

Don Rondo (born Donald T. Rondeau; January 5, 1930 – January 27, 2011) was an American singer of popular music ballads during the mid-1950s, known for his distinctive baritone voice.

== Early life ==
Rondo was the son of Oliver and Elmira Rondeau, and grew up on a dairy farm near Ware, Massachusetts. He had five brothers and one sister.

According to his official website his first time singing in public was at a local Lions Club talent show. Two salesmen came to his father's farm, heard the boy singing in the barn, and signed him up for the talent show.

== Career ==
Rondo first became popular following the 1956 release of his rendition of the song "Two Different Worlds". Released by Jubilee Records in October 1956, the song spent three months on the Billboard chart, peaking at #11. It eventually sold more than a million copies, and established Rondo at a time when music of his genre was facing strong competition from rock and roll. Among his television appearances was a 1957 appearance on the TV game show, To Tell the Truth.

Jubilee quickly followed the success of "Two Different Worlds" with another release, a double A-side, "The Love I Never Had" and "Don't", which was an entirely different song from the Elvis Presley song of the same name. However, this release fared less well, and a third single, "On Forgotten Street", also failed to make an impact.

Changing tempo in 1957, Rondo's next release was a cheerful number, "White Silver Sands", written by Red Matthews, which provided Rondo with a #7 chart hit. The song actually became Jubilee's biggest selling record, and another million-seller, but the gold disc-winning "White Silver Sands" was to be Rondo's last major hit. On the B-side of this record was the jazz standard "Stars Fell on Alabama". Other releases followed, including "There's Only You" and "Forsaking All Others", but these barely made it into the charts.

Rondo appeared on the February 5, 1957, broadcast of the CBS game show To Tell the Truth. Nearly stumping the entire panel, Rondo received only one vote, from panelist Glenn Ford. New York Yankees baseball player Jerry Coleman appeared as one of the other two imposters, receiving two votes.

After leaving Jubilee, Rondo signed with Atlantic Records, where he released another double A-side, "Malibu" / "So Did I". He also recorded songs for Carlton Records, Roulette and Decca. Among his Carlton releases was "A Hoot 'n A Holler", while his Roulette recordings included "The Golden Rule". Among his Decca recordings are "Beyond The Mighty River" and "Evening Star". None of these achieved the success of his early Jubilee material, however, and musical tastes had, by then, dramatically shifted.

By the mid-1960s, Rondo had moved into broadcasting. He did a number of voiceovers for radio and television commercials, including the popular jingles "Where the Rubber Meets the Road" for Firestone and "It's Us, Or Rust" for Ziebart.

In his later years, he became a radio presenter in New Hampshire.

== Personal life and death ==
Rondo was married to the former Ida Mae Bousquet for 61 years. The couple had three children: Deborah, Gary, and Ronald.

He died at his home in Contoocook, New Hampshire on January 27, 2011, a year after being diagnosed with lung cancer.
