= Caroline Sieber =

Austrian fashion stylist based in London (born 1984)

- Born: 10 May 1984 (age 42); Vienna, Austria
- Occupation: Stylist
- Spouse: Fritz von Westenholz (m. 2013)

Caroline Sieber (born 10 May 1982) is an Austrian fashion stylist based in London. She was named the best dressed woman in the world by Tatler in 2010 and has been a Chanel brand ambassador since 2009.

== Life and career ==
Sieber grew up in Vienna, Austria. She spent some of her formative years living in a wing of the Palais Schwarzenberg. After completing university in Austria, she relocated to London where she initially worked as an accountant. Sieber would later leave accountancy to become a fashion stylist. Actress Emma Watson was one of her early notable clients, and one of her closest friends. In June 2009, fashion brand, Chanel, announced that Sieber would be one of five new beauty ambassadors for its brand alongside Poppy Delevingne, Leigh Lezark, Vanessa Traina, and Jen Brill. The women were referred to by Chanel as "Les Fidèles" ("Faithful Ones").

In 2011, she became the face of Louis Vuitton's "Speedy Bag" campaign. She was quoted in 2012 as describing the joy of buying couture as "like opening Pandora's box; you can never go back".

On 13 July 2013, Sieber married Fritz von Westenholz in Vienna. The wedding was featured on the September 2013 cover of Vogue where it was called the "Wedding of the Year". Guests included Christopher Kane, Erdem, Clare Waight Keller, Lauren Santo Domingo, Hamish Bowles, Derek Blasberg, Pippa Middleton, Emma Watson, and Julia Restoin Roitfeld. Sieber was married in a Chanel Haute Couture dress designed by Karl Lagerfeld, from radzimir silk with a long train and featured balloon sleeves and embroideries by Lesage on chest and back. She was wearing a veil by Maison Michel and shoes by Massaro.

In 2015, Sieber was again featured in Vogue for a piece discussing her and her husband's London residence. In November 2018, Sieber co-hosted an event for the opening of the Marie-Chantal London flagship store. Throughout her career, Sieber has been a fixture at numerous runway shows and fashion events. She is also a regular attendee of the Serpentine Summer Party, including most recently in June 2019.
