= Sigebert =

Sigebert (which means roughly "magnificent victory"), also spelled Sigbert, Sigibert, Sigobert, Sigeberht, or Siegeberht, is the name of:

== Frankish and Anglo-Saxon kings ==
- Sigobert the Lame (died c. 509), a king of the Franks
- Sigebert I, King of Austrasia (reigned 561–575)
- Sigebert II, King of Austrasia and Burgundy (reigned 613)
- Sigebert III, King of Austrasia (reigned 634–656)
- Sigeberht the Little, King of Essex (reigned 623?–653)
- Sigeberht the Good, a king of Essex (reigned c. 653–660)
- Sigeberht of East Anglia, saint and a king of the East Angles (reigned c. 629–c. 634)
- Sigeberht of Wessex, King of Wessex (reigned 756–757)

== Others ==
- Sigebert of Gembloux (c. 1030–1112), Belgian medieval author and historian
- Sigebert Buckley (c. 1520–probably 1610), Benedictine monk in England
- Sigebert IV, fictitious son of the Merovingian king Dagobert II

== See also ==
- Siegbert
