= Ziebart =

American automotive aftermarket provider

Ziebart International Corporation

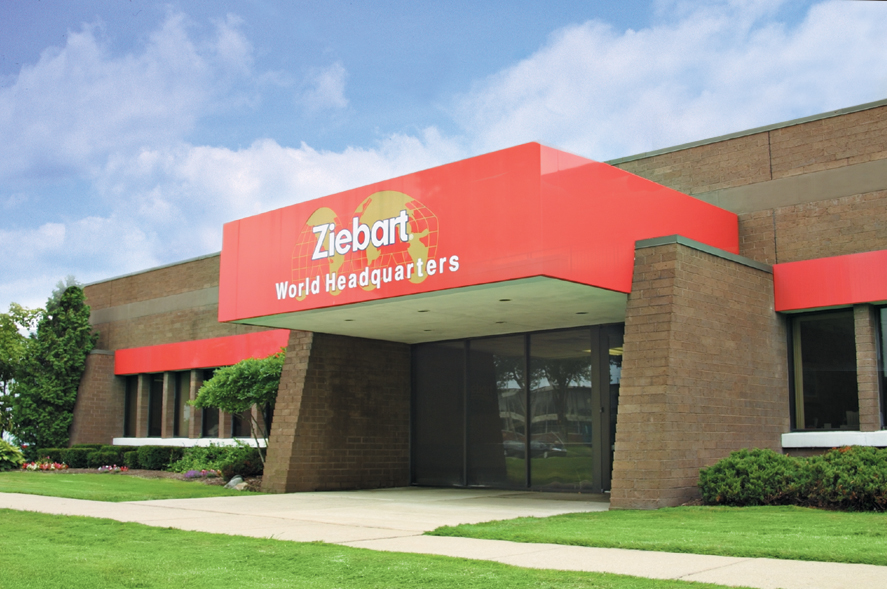
- Ziebart World Headquarters in Troy, Michigan
- Type: Private
- Industry: automotive aftermarket
- Founded: Detroit, Michigan (1959)
- Founder: Kurt Ziebart
- Headquarters: Troy, Michigan, United States
- Area served: 34 countries (1200 service centers)
- Key people: Thomas E. Wolfe, President and CEO
- Services: rustproofing and automobile detailing
- Revenue: US$ 170 million (2018)
- Number of employees: 578 (2018)
- Website: ziebart.com

Ziebart International Corporation is a privately owned corporation based in Troy, Michigan, and is the worldwide franchisor of the Ziebart brand of automotive aftermarket stores.

Services offered by Ziebart stores include rustproofing, paint sealant, paint protection film, automobile detailing, window tinting; and the installation of various aftermarket accessories.

== History ==
The German-born American Kurt Ziebart was the inventor of the rustproofing process for automobiles. It was while working in a Packard body shop in Detroit that Ziebart saw the effects of rust and began looking for a way to protect cars against it. The process he developed is now often called "Ziebart-ing" or "Ziebart-ed", a generic term for rustproofing.

In 1959, Kurt Ziebart founded the Auto Rustproofing Company in Detroit with two partners. The first international location opened in Windsor, Ontario in 1962.

In 1963, Ziebart sold the company to an investor group led by Roger Waindle, who acquired the trademarked name, patented process, and exclusive tooling. Waindle developed a franchise system, and the company was renamed Ziebart Auto Truck Rustproofing Company.

By 1969, Ziebart (then Ziebart Rustproofing Company) had about 150 franchises in the Midwest of the US and in Canada. As Waindle was interested in selling the company, he hired E.J. Hartmann as Chief Operating Officer. Hartmann was an MBA graduate from the University of Michigan who was recruited from Shatterproof Glass Corporation where he was the company's controller.

In 1970, Hartmann acquired the controlling stock of Ziebart and started an aggressive marketing program both in the US and internationally.

In 1973, Ziebart in Hilo Hawaii opened its doors to be the first and the only Ziebart franchise in the Hawaiian Islands.

In 1977, Ziebart introduced "Zee-Glaze", a protective polymer sealant that chemically bonded to cars' paint.

In 1979, Ziebart (then Ziebart International Corporation) acquired Arndt Palmer Laboratories, a small chemical manufacturer for car care chemicals in Melvindale, MI. This company was then relocated to Redford, MI, and became the base for Ziebart's manufacturing of its own rustproofing sealant, a wax based petroleum product.

By the end of the decade, Ziebart had increased the number of franchised locations worldwide to over 650, while at the same time doubling the retail volume of US franchisees.

In 1980, Ziebart expanded its services to include sunroofs, running boards, window tinting, and other automotive accessories. That year, all American Motors cars received "Ziebart Factory Rust Protection," featuring epoxy-based primer dipping, galvanized steel panels, plastic fender liners, and aluminized screws. AMC supported this with a 5-year "No Rust Thru" warranty as part of its "Buyer Protection Plan."

In 1988, Ziebart acquired the North American franchise rights for its competitor Tuff-Kote Dinol. Tuff-Kote franchisees were subsequently converted to the Ziebart brand. Kurt Ziebart appeared in national television commercials coinciding with his former company's 25th anniversary.

In 1989, Ziebart acquired the Tidy Car automotive detailing franchise operation. The brands were merged and over 250 locations became "Ziebart Tidy Car".

In 1990, Ziebart had more than 1,000 locations in 40 countries and more than $100 million in worldwide dealer sales.

In 1995, Hartmann sold the ownership to Ziebart International Corporation to an Employee Stock Ownership Plan (ESOP) led by Thomas Wolfe, the then CFO. Hartman then retired.

In 1998, Ziebart entered into a co-branding agreement with Speedy Auto Glass and began offering auto glass replacement in many of its locations. Ziebart has also partnered to co-brand with Rhino Linings USA, which offers polyurethane spray-on liners for truck beds.

As of 2011, there were over 400 Ziebart locations in 30 countries worldwide.

In 2014, Ziebart introduced a proprietary paint protection film.

== Advertising ==
Ziebart grew in large part due to its successful advertising campaigns.

- In 1970, corporate advertising started with Ziebart ads appearing in Life, Look, Time, Newsweek and other national magazines.
- On radio and television, Don Rondo sang the famous Ziebart jingle, "It's Us, Or Rust", which was written by Artie Fields.
- Actor Malachi Throne was a national television spokesman for Ziebart in several advertising campaigns in the early 1970s.
- In 1975, The Twilight Zone's Rod Serling was Ziebart's spokesman in a series of television commercials
- In 1979, actor Cameron Mitchell became the national spokesman for Ziebart in a series of television commercials that ran for several years.
- In 1983, radio personality Russ Gibb was the voice-over on Ziebart rust protection TV spots.
- In 1985, Ziebart's first Clio Award-winning TV campaign, "Friend of the Family (Rust in Peace)", began running with actor Andrew Duggan doing the voice-over.
- In 1988, company founder Kurt Ziebart appeared in television commercials coinciding with its 25th anniversary.
- In 1997, Ziebart ran an advertising campaign featuring Batman's Adam West as its spokesman.

Ziebart's advertising agencies of record through the years have included Meltzer Aaron & Lemen (San Francisco, CA), Ross Roy (Detroit, MI), Simons Michelson Zieve (Troy, MI) and Doyle Dane Bernbach (New York, NY).

Ziebart's public relations agency from 1970 through 1993 was Anthony M. Franco Inc (Detroit, MI).
