= Žibert =

Žibert is a Slovene surname, a variant of Siebert. Notable people with the surname include:

- Anja Bah Žibert (born 1973), Slovenian politician
- Urban Žibert (born 1992), Slovenian footballer
