= Donald Seibert =

American football player and coach (1922–2003)

Biographical details
- Born: January 31, 1922; Hanover, Pennsylvania, U.S.
- Died: December 9, 2003 (aged 81); Carlisle, Pennsylvania, U.S.
- Education: George Washington University

Playing career
- 1942: George Washington
- Position: Fullback

Coaching career (HC unless noted)
- 1957–1964: Dickinson

Head coaching record
- Overall: 23–39–1

Donald R. Seibert (January 31, 1922 – December 9, 2003) was an American football coach. He was the 29th head football coach at Dickinson College in Carlisle, Pennsylvania, serving for eight seasons, from 1957 to 1964, and compiling a record of 23–39–1.
