= Rustproofing =

Prevention of rusting of iron and steel objects

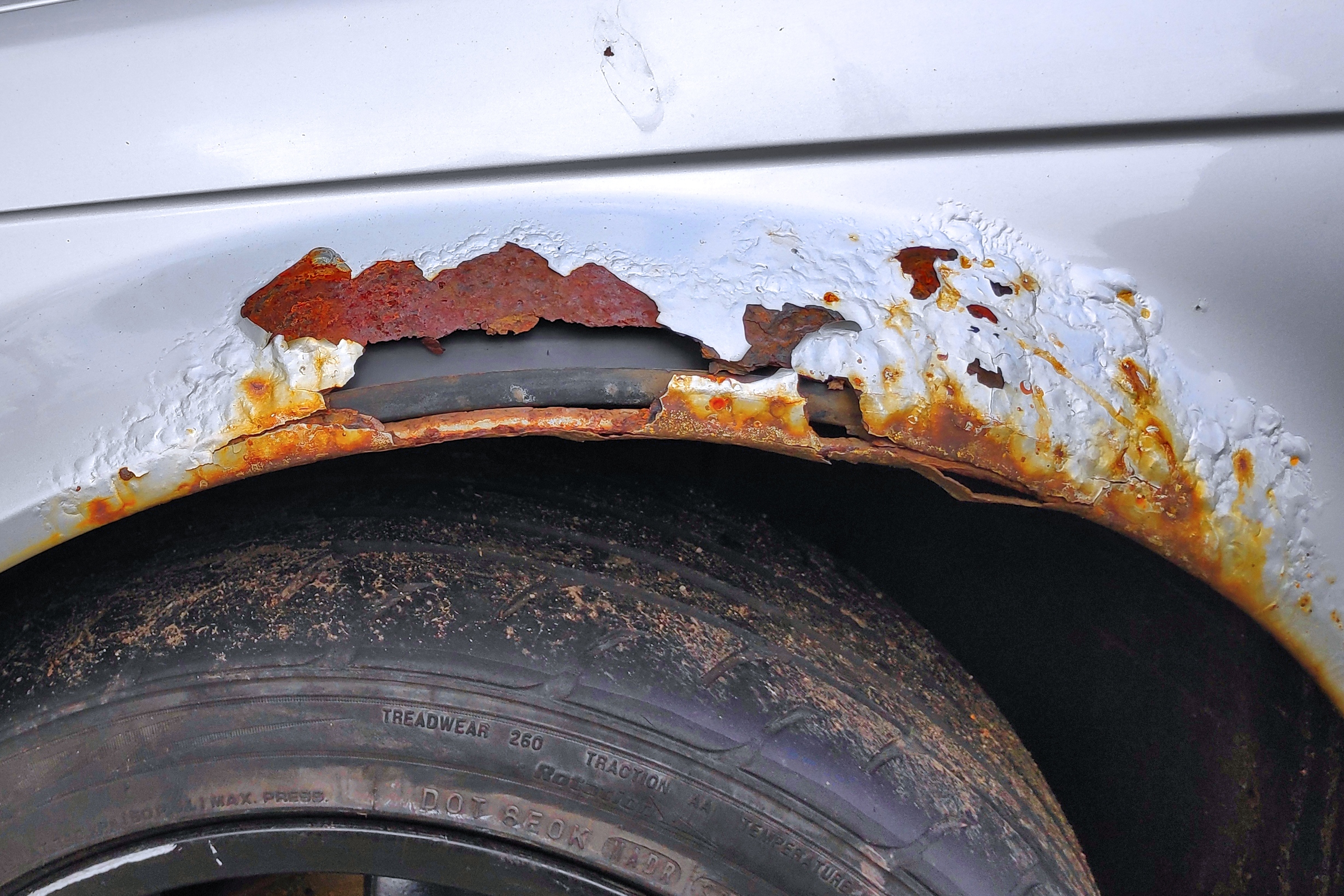
Severe car body corrosion example

Rustproofing is the prevention or delay of rusting of iron and steel objects, or the permanent protection against corrosion. Typically, the protection is achieved by a process of surface finishing or treatment. Depending on mechanical wear or environmental conditions, the degradation may not be stopped completely, unless the process is periodically repeated. The term is particularly used in the automobile industry.

== Vehicle rustproofing ==
=== Factory ===
In the factory, car bodies are protected with special chemical formulations.

Typically, phosphate conversion coatings were used. Some firms galvanized part or all of their car bodies before the primer coat of paint was applied. If a car is body-on-frame, then the frame (chassis) must also be rustproofed. In traditional automotive manufacturing of the early- and mid-20th century, paint was the final part of the rustproofing barrier between the body shell and the atmosphere, except on the underside. On the underside, an underseal rubberized or PVC-based coating was often sprayed on. These products will be breached eventually and can lead to unseen corrosion that spreads underneath the underseal. Old 1960s and 1970s rubberized underseal can become brittle on older cars and is particularly liable to this.

The first electrodeposition primer was developed in the 1950s, but were found to be impractical for widespread use. Revised cathodic automotive electrocoat primer systems were introduced in the 1970s that markedly reduced the problem of corrosion that had been experienced by a vast number of automobiles in the first seven decades of automobile manufacturing. Termed e-coat, "electrocoat automotive primers are applied by totally submerging the assembled car body in a large tank that contains the waterborne e-coat, and the coating is applied through cathodic electrodeposition. This assures nearly 100% coverage of all metal surfaces by the primer. The coating chemistry is waterborne enamel based on epoxy, an aminoalcohol adduct, and blocked isocyanate, which all crosslink on baking to form an epoxy-urethane resin system.

E-coat resin technology, combined with the excellent coverage provided by electrodeposition, provides one of the more effective coatings for protecting steel from corrosion. For modern automobile manufacturing after the 1990s, nearly all cars use e-coat technology as base foundation for their corrosion protection coating system.

=== Aftermarket ===
Aftermarket kits are available to apply rustproofing compounds both to external surfaces and inside enclosed sections, for example sills/rocker panels (see monocoque), through either existing or specially drilled holes. The compounds are usually wax-based and can be applied by aerosol can, brush, low pressure pump up spray, or compressor fed spray gun.

An alternative for sills/rocker panels is to block drain holes and simply fill them up with wax and then drain most of it out (the excess can be stored and reused), leaving a complete coating inside. Anti-rust wax like phosphoric acid based rust killers/neutralizers can also be painted on already rusted areas. Loose or thick rust must be removed before anti-rust wax like Waxoyl or a similar product is used.

Structural rust (affecting structural components which must withstand considerable forces) should be cut back to sound metal and new metal welded in, or the affected part should be completely replaced. Wax may not penetrate spot-welded seams or thick rust effectively. A thinner (less viscous) mineral-oil-based anti-rust product followed by anti-rust wax can be more effective. Application is easier in hot weather rather than cold because even when pre-heated, the products are viscous and don't flow and penetrate well on cold metal.

Aftermarket "underseals" can also be applied. They are particularly useful in high-impact areas like wheel arches. There are two types - drying and non-drying. The hardening and drying products are also known as "Shutz" and "Anti Stone Chip" with similar potential problems to the original factory underseals. These are available in black, white, grey and red colors and can be overpainted. These are best used for the area below the bumpers on cars that have painted metal body work in that location, rather than modern plastic deep bumpers. The bitumen based products do not dry and harden, so they cannot become brittle, like the confusingly named "Underbody Seal with added Waxoyl" made by Hammerite, which can be supplied in a Shutz type cartridge labelled "Shutz" for use with a Shutz compressor fed gun. Mercedes bodyshops use a similar product supplied by Mercedes-Benz. There are many manufacturers of similar products at varying prices, these are regularly group tested and reviewed in the classic car magazine press.

The non drying types contain anti-rust chemicals similar to those in anti-rust waxes. Petroleum-based rust-inhibitors provide several benefits, including the ability to creep over metal, covering missed areas. Additionally, a petroleum, solvent-free rust inhibitor remains on the metal surface, sealing it from rust-accelerating water and oxygen. Other benefits of petroleum-based rust protection include the self-healing properties that come naturally to oils, which helps undercoatings to resist abrasion caused by road sand and other debris. The disadvantage of using a petroleum-based coating is the film left over on surfaces, rendering these products too messy for top side exterior application, and unsafe in areas where it can be slipped on. They also cannot be painted.

There are aftermarket electronic "rustproofing" technologies claimed to prevent corrosion by "pushing" electrons into the car body, to limit the combination of oxygen and iron to form rust. The loss of electrons in paint is also claimed to be the cause of “paint oxidisation” and the electronic system is also supposed to protect the paint. However, there is no peer reviewed scientific testing and validation supporting the use of these devices and corrosion control professionals find they do not work.

=== Rate of corrosion ===
The rate at which vehicles corrode is dependent upon:

- Local climate and use of ice-melting chemicals (salt) upon the roads
- Atmospheric pollution, such as acid rain or salt spray, which can cause paint damage
- Quality, thickness, and composition of metal used, often an alloy of mild steel
- Improper use of some dissimilar metals, which can accelerate the rusting of steel bodywork through electrolytic corrosion
- Design of "rust traps" (nooks and crannies that collect road dirt and water)
- Particular process of rustproofing used
- Plastic/under-seal protection on the car underside
- Exposure to salt water, which strips off the protective paint and also causes rust much more quickly than ordinary rain water would

== Rustproof alloys ==
Stainless steel, also known as "inox steel" does not stain, corrode, or rust as easily as ordinary steel. Pierre Berthier, a Frenchman, was the first to notice the rust-resistant properties of mixing chromium with alloys in 1821, which led to new metal treating and metallurgy processes, and eventually the creation of usable stainless steel. DeLorean cars had a fiberglass body structure with a steel backbone chassis, along with external brushed stainless-steel body panels.

Some cars have been made from aluminum, which may be more corrosion resistant than steel when exposed to water, but not to salt or certain other chemicals.

Weathering steel, often referred to by the genericised trademark COR-TEN steel and sometimes written without the hyphen as corten steel, is a group of steel alloys which were developed to eliminate the need for painting by forming a stable external layer of rust. U.S. Steel (USS) holds the registered trademark on the name COR-TEN. The name COR-TEN refers to the two distinguishing properties of this type of steel: corrosion resistance and tensile strength.

== See also ==
- Corrosion
- Corrosion engineering
- Hot-dip galvanizing
- Tinning
- Iron pillar of Delhi
- Cathodic Protection for Vehicles
- Cosmoline
- Corrosion inhibitor
