= Günter Siebert (weightlifter) =

German weightlifter (born 1931)

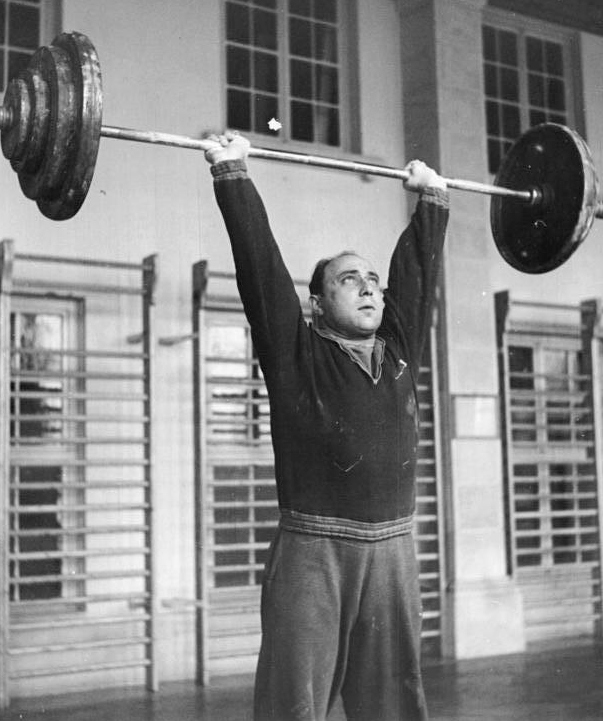
- Siebert in 1957

Personal information
- Born: 1931 (age 94–95)

Sport
- Sport: Weightlifting
Medal record
Representing East Germany
European Weightlifting Championships
Bronze medal – third place	1956 Helsinki	Light heavyweight
Bronze medal – third place	1958 Stockholm	Light heavyweight

Günter Siebert (born 1931) is a retired German light heavyweight (−82.5 kg) weightlifter who won bronze medals at the European championships of 1956 and 1956.
