= List of NFL officials =

American football officials who have experience working National Football League (NFL) games include:

Note: Years listed refer to season the official began or ended career in the NFL. At the start of the 1998 season, the NFL switched position titles of back judge and field judge. Prior to 1998, the field judge was the deep official in the center of the field, and the back judge was deep on the sideline.

| Active officials | Retired officials |
|---|---|
| == A == : Brad Allen (2014–present) referee; Barry Anderson (2007–present) side judge 2007–2010; field judge 2011–2014; umpire 2015–present; == B == : Michael Banks (2002–present) side judge 2002–2014; field judge 2015–present; Allen Baynes (2008–present) side judge; Rusty Baynes (1999, 2010–present) line judge; Grantis Bell (2020–present) back judge; Jeff Bergman (1991–present) line judge 1991–2015; head linesman 2016–2017; line judge 2018–present; Jerry Bergman Jr. (2002–present) down judge; Tra Blake (2020–present) umpire 2020–2021, 2025; referee 2022–2024; Clete Blakeman (2008–present) field judge 2008–2009; referee 2010–present; Brian Bolinger (2017–present) line judge; Derick Bowers (2003–present) line judge 2003; head linesman/down judge 2004–present; Greg Bradley (2009–present) side judge 2009; head linesman/down judge 2010–present; Terry Brown (2006–present) field judge 2006–2016; side judge 2017–present; Fred Bryan (2009–present) umpire; Jimmy Buchanan (2009–present) field judge; == C == : Ed Camp (2000–present) head linesman; Mike Carr (2017–present) line judge; Gary Cavaletto (2003–present) field judge 2003–2014; side judge 2015–present; Carl Cheffers (2000–present) side judge 2000–2007; referee 2008–present; Land Clark (2018–present) field judge 2018–2019; referee 2020–present; Kevin Codey (2015–present) line judge; James Coleman (2005–present) side judge 2005–2015, 2017–present; field judge 2016; Walt Coleman IV (2015–present) side judge; == D == : Ryan Dickson (2017–present) side judge; Lee Dyer (2003–present) field judge 2003–2004; back judge 2005–present; == E == : Scott Edwards (1999–present) field judge 1999–2013; side judge 2014–present; Roy Ellison (2003–present) umpire; Alan Eck (2016–present) side judge 2016; umpire 2017–present; == F == : Keith Ferguson (2000–present) back judge; Walt Flowers (2023-present) Line Judge; Dan Ferrell (2003–present) umpire; Brad Freeman (2014–present) field judge 2014–2016; side judge 2017–present; Steve Freeman (2001–present) field judge 2001; back judge 2002–present; == G == : Frank Glover Sr. (1972-1988) line judge 1972, head linesman 1973-1988; Greg Gautreaux (2002–present) field judge 2002–2014, 2017–present; side judge 2015–2016; Ramon George (2016–present) umpire; == H == : Eugene Hall (2014–present) field judge; Rich Hall (2004–present) umpire; Laird Hayes (1995–present) side judge; Scott Helverson (2003–present) back judge; Adrian Hill (2010–present) line judge 2010–2013; field judge 2014–2016; side judge 2017–2018; referee 2019–present; Tom Hill (1999–present) side judge 1999–2015; field judge 2016–present; Mark Hittner (1997–present) head linesman; Shawn Hochuli (2014–present) side judge 2014; back judge 2015–2017; referee 2018–present; Buddy Horton (1999–present) back judge 1999–2002; field judge 2003–present; Jim Howey (1999–present) back judge 1999–2008; field judge 2009–2011; head linesman 2012–present; John Hussey (2002–present) line judge 2002–2014; referee 2015–present; == I == : Kent Intagliata (2012 NFL season) side judge 2012; umpire 2012; == J == : John Jenkins (2014–present) field judge; Carl Johnson (2001–2009; 2013–present) line judge; vice president of officiating 2010–2012; Ken Jurca (2009–present) umpire; == K == : Alex Kemp (2014–present) field judge 2014; side judge 2015–2017; referee 2018–present; Terry Killens (2019–present) umpire; Paul King (2009–present) umpire; == L == : Jeff Lamberth (2002–present) field judge 2002, 2013; side judge 2003–2012, 2014–present; Joe Larrew (2002–present) side judge 2002–2016; field judge 2017–present; Bart Longson (2015–present) line judge; Jon Lucivansky (2009–present) field judge 2009–2014, 2017–present; side judge 2015–2016; Lawrence Smith (American football) (2025–present) judge 2015-present; == M == : Wayne Mackie (2007–present) head linesman; Clay Martin (2015–present) umpire 2015–2017; referee 2018–present; Julian Mapp (2009–present) head linesman 2009–2011; line judge 2012–present; Rich Martinez (2014–present) back judge; John McGrath (2002–present) head linesman; Dana McKenzie (2008–present) head linesman 2008–2015; line judge 2016–present; Phil McKinnely (2002–present) head linesman; Jim Mello (2004–present) head linesman; David Meslow (2011–present) field judge; Greg Meyer (2002–present) field judge 2002; side judge 2003–2015; back judge 2016–present; Tony Michalek (2002–present) umpire; Terrence Miles (2008–present) back judge; Jonah Monroe (2015–present) side judge; Alex Moore (2022–present) umpire 2022–2024; referee 2025; == N == : Bryan Neale (2014–present) umpire; Scott Novak (2014–present) side judge 2014–2016; field judge 2017–2018; referee 2019–present; == O == : David Oliver (2017–present) down judge; == P == : Carl Paganelli (1999–present) umpire; Dino Paganelli (2006–present) back judge; Perry Paganelli (1998–present) back judge; Steve Patrick (2014–present) back judge; Rick Patterson (1995–present) side judge 1995–2014; field judge 2015–present; Kent Payne (2004–present) head linesman 2004–2016; line judge 2017–present; Mark Pellis (2014–present) umpire; Mark Perlman (2000–2001, 2003–present) line judge (was on medical leave during the 2002 NFL season); Jerod Phillips (2016–present) head linesman; Tim Podraza (2008–present) line judge; Dyrol Prioleau (2007–present) side judge 2007, 2016–present; field judge 2008–2015; Todd Prukop (2009–present) back judge; == Q == : Jim Quirk Jr. (2010–present) field judge 2010–2012; back judge 2013–present; == R == : Mearl Robinson (2017–present) field judge; Brad Rogers (2017–present) field judge 2017–2018, referee 2019-present; Doug Rosenbaum (2001–present) side judge 2001–2003, 2012–2013; field judge 2004–2011, 2014–present; Jimmy Russell (2019–present) side judge; == S == : Aaron Santi (2015–present) field judge; Bill Schuster (2000–present) umpire; Jeff Seeman (2002–present) line judge; Dale Shaw (2013–present) back judge 2013–2015; field judge 2016–present; Danny Short (2017–present) line judge; Hol Slutz (1946-1949) Referee; Shawn Smith (2015–present) umpire 2015–2017, referee 2018–present; Mike Spanier (1999–present) line judge 1999–2016; down judge 2017–present; Greg Steed (2003–present) back judge; Mark Steinkerchner (1994–present) line judge; Steve Stelljes (2002–present) head linesman; Tom Stephan (1999–present) line judge; Bruce Stritesky (2006–present) umpire; Tom Symonette (2004–present) line judge 2004–2016; down judge 2017–present; == T == : Sarah Thomas (2015–present) line judge 2015–2016; down judge 2017–present (first full-time female official; down judge for Super Bowl LV); Ronald Torbert (2010–present) side judge 2010–2013; referee 2014–present; Karina Tovar (2024–present) field judge (fourth full-time female official; also first female official assigned to deep position); Pat Turner (2014–present) head linesman; == U == == V == : Lo Van Pham (2022--present) side judge (first Asian-American official in pro football history); Rob Vernatchi (2004–present) side judge 2004, 2013–present; field judge 2005–2009; back judge 2010–2012; Tony Veteri Jr. (1992–present) head linesman; Bill Vinovich (2001–2006; 2012–present) side judge 2001–2003; referee 2004–2006, 2012–present; == W == : Ed Walker (2014–present) line judge 2014; head linesman 2015–present; Jabir Walker (2015–present) field judge 2015–2016; side judge 2017–present; Undrey Wash (2000–present) umpire; Keith Washington (2008–present) side judge; Greg Wilson (2008–present) side judge 2008; back judge 2009–present; Steve Woods (2017–present) umpire; Craig Wrolstad (2003–present) field judge 2003–2013; referee 2014–present; == X == == Y == : Greg Yette (2010–present) back judge; == Z == | == A == : John Alderton 1989–1995 line judge; Bruce Alford (1960–1979) line judge; Hendi Ančićh (1982–1998) line judge 1982; umpire 1983–1998; Dave Anderson (1984–2002) head linesman; line judge; Walt Anderson (1996–2019) line judge 1996–2002; referee 2003–2019; senior vice president of officiating 2020–2023; Gary Arthur (1997–2020) line judge; Gerald Austin (1982–2007) side judge 1982–1989; referee 1990–2007; == B == : Mark Baltz (1989–2013) head linesman; Tom Barnes (1986–2012) line judge; Gene Barth (1971–1990) line judge 1971–75; referee 1976–90 (died in October 1991 while active); Ron Baynes (1987–2000) side judge 1987; line judge 1988–2000; Tommy Bell (1962–1976) referee (referee for Super Bowl III and Super Bowl VII); Bob Beeks (1968-1990) line judge (first African-American to officiate five Super Bowls); Michael Bell (2012) head linesman; Jerry Bergman (1966–1995) head linesman (father of NFL officials Jeff Bergman and Jerry Bergman Jr.); Ron Blum (1985–2007) line judge 1985–1992, 2004–2007; referee 1993–2003; Jerome Boger (2004–2022) line judge 2004–2005; referee 2006–2022; Mike Borgard (1990–1996) side judge; Byron Boston (1995–2019) line judge (father of NFL WR David Boston); Ron Botchan (1980–2001) line judge 1980; umpire 1981–2001; Bob Boylston (1978–1998) umpire; Barry Brown (1966–1971) umpire; Chad Brown (1992–2014) umpire; Author of Inside the Meat Grinder; Bud Brubaker (1950–1969) referee; Fred Bryan (2009–present) umpire; == C == : Don Carey (1995-2013) field judge 1995–1997; back judge 1998–2008, 2010–2013; referee 2009; Mike Carey (1990–2013) side judge 1990–1994; referee 1995–2013; former NFL on CBS rules analyst (first African-American referee in a Super Bowl, Super Bowl XLII); Don Carlsen (1989–2012) side judge; Bill Carollo (1989–2008) side judge 1989–1996; referee 1997–2008; Duke Carroll (1995-2008 [1]) back judge 1995–1997; field judge 1998–2008; Red Cashion (1972–1996) line judge 1972–1975; referee 1976–1996; Maia Chaka (2021–2023) line judge 2021–2023 (second full-time female official); Boris Cheek (1996–2025) back judge 1996–1997; field judge 1998–2010, 2012–2013, 2015; side judge 2011, 2014, 2016–2025; Jimmy Cole 1970–1976 field judge; Walt Coleman (1989–2018) line judge 1989–1994; referee 1995–2018; Joe Connell (1952–1978) umpire; Al Conway (1969–1996) umpire; Tony Corrente (1995–2021) back judge 1995–1997; referee 1998–2021; Ed Coukart (1989–2005) umpire; Wilmer G. Crowell (1936) head referee during 1936 NFL Championship Game; Hugo Cruz (2015–2018) head linesman 2015–2016; down judge 2017–2018 – first official fired mid-season in the Super Bowl era [2]; == D == : Scott Dawson (1995–2013) umpire; Jim Daopoulos (1989–1999) back judge 1989–1996; umpire 1997–1999; League Supervisor 2000–2011; Jimmy DeBell (2009–2014) side judge; Garth DeFelice (1998–2013) umpire; Robin DeLorenzo (2022–2024) down judge 2022; line judge 2023–2024 (third full-time female official; demoted to NCAA FBS for 2025); Art Demmas (1968–1996) umpire; Ray Dodez (1968–1992) head linesman; line judge; side judge; back judge; Dick Dolack (1965–1990) field judge; Tom Dooley (1978–1992) line judge 1978–1980; referee 1981–1992; Don Dorkowski (1986–2006) field judge 1986–1997; back judge 1998–2006; Kirk Dornan (1994–2014) field judge 1994–1997; back judge 1998–2014; Ray Douglas (1968–1983) back judge (died on Christmas Day 1983 while active); Ben Dreith (1960–1990) field judge 1960–1964; referee 1965–1989; line judge 1990; == E == : Shannon Eastin (2012), line judge (first female on-field official); Rich Eichhorst (1969–70) line judge; George Ellis (1967–1973) field judge (forced to miss 1973 season due to kidney disease, passed away in July 1974); == F == : Jack Fette (1966–1987) line judge; Dr Edward Fiffick (1970s—1980s) back judge; Tom Fincken (1984–2007) side judge; Bruce Finlayson 1961–1974 head linesman 1961–72; line judge 1973–74; Bob Finley 1960–1970 umpire, referee (referee for "Heidi Game"); Walt Fitzgerald 1970 referee; John Fouch 1960–1979 back judge; Ruben Fowler (2006–2020) umpire; Bob Frederic (1965–1987) back judge 1965–1970; referee 1971–1987; Dick Ferguson (1974–1985) side judge; == G == : Greg Gautreaux (2002–2021) field judge 2002–2014, 2017–present; side judge 2015–2016; Ronald Gibbs (1942–1960) referee (referee for 1958 NFL Championship Game, "The Greatest Game Ever Played"); Terry Gierke (1981–2001) head linesman; Joe Gonzales (1954–1974) field judge; Fritz Graf (1960–1983) field judge; Scott Green (1991–2013) field judge 1991–1997; back judge 1998–2004; referee 2005–2013; Johnny Grier (1981–2004) field judge 1981–1987; referee 1988–2004 (first African-American referee); == H == : Pat Haggerty (1965–1992) line judge 1965, referee 1966–1992; Don Hakes (1977–1998) field judge 1977–1997; back judge 1998; Jim Hamer (1947–1960) referee; Dale Hamer (1978–1994; 1996–2001) head linesman 1978–1988, 1998–2001; referee 1989–1994, 1996–1997 (On leave in 1995); Dave Hamilton (1975–1994) umpire (died in January 1995 while active); Donnie Hampton (1988–1994) field judge (died in January 1995 while active); Butch Hannah (1999–2016) umpire; Dick Hantak (1978–2002) line judge 1978–1980; back judge 1981–1985; referee 1986–2002; Pat Harder (1966–1982) umpire; Gerry Hart (1970–1977) umpire; Laird Hayes (1995–2017) side judge; George Hayward (1991–2015) head linesman; Chuck Heberling (1965–1986) line judge 1965–1971; referee 1972–1986; Tommy Hensley (1967–1987) head linesman 1967–1971; umpire 1972–1987; Ed Hochuli (1990–2017) back judge 1990–1991; referee 1992–2017; Art Holst (1966–1980) line judge, author of Sunday Zebras; Buddy Horton (1999–2017) back judge 1999–2002; field judge 2003–2017; Jim Howey (1999–2017) back judge 1999–2008; field judge 2009–2011; head linesman 2012–2017; == I == == J == : Vince Jacob (1975–1982) line judge 1975–1977, side judge 1978–82 (died during 1982 NFLPA strike while active); Hunter Jackson (1966-1971) back judge; Doyle Jackson (1988–1989) side judge; Stan Javie (1951–1980) back judge (father of NBA referee Steve Javie); Darrell Jenkins (2002–2014) umpire; Dick Jorgensen (1968–1989) line judge 1968–1970; referee 1971–1989 (died in October 1990 while active); Al Jury (1978–2004) back judge 1978–1997; field judge 1998–2004; == K == : Jim Kearney (1978–1993) back judge; John Keck (1972–1996) umpire; Tom Kelleher (1960–1987) back judge (first official to work five Super Bowls); Stan Kemp (1986–1992) side judge 1986–1990; referee 1991–1992; George Kennard 1970–1971 Umpire; Harry Kessel (1963-1972) head linesman (died in October 1972 while active); Frank Kirkland 1963–1974 field judge; Grover Klemmer (1955–1981) head linesman 1955–1966, back judge 1967–1977, side judge 1978–1981; James Knight (1994–1995) back judge; Bernie Kukar (1984–2005) field judge 1984–1990; referee 1991–2005; == L == : Gary Lane (1982–1999) side judge 1982–1991, 1998–1999; referee 1992–1997; Joe Larrew (2002–2021) side judge 2002–2016; field judge 2017–2021; Bob Lawing (1997–2009) field judge 1997; back judge 1998–2008 (died before 2009 season while active); Bill Leavy (1995–2014) field judge 1995–1997; back judge 1998–2000; referee 2001–2014; Cal Lepore (1966–1980) head linesman 1966–1973; referee 1974–1980; replay official 1986–1991; Darryll Lewis (1997–2014) line judge; Dean Look (1972–2002) line judge 1972–1977; side judge 1978–2002; Bill Lovett (1990–2007) back judge 1990–1997; field judge 1998–2007; Phil Luckett (1991–2007) field judge 1991–1996; referee 1997–2000; back judge 2001–2005, 2007 (On leave for 2006 NFL season); Frank Luzar (1960–1974) field judge; == M == : Gil Mace (1974–1989) line judge 1974–1975, head linesman 1976–1979, side judge 1980–1989; Wayne Mackie (2007–2016) head linesman; Carl Madsen (1997–2021) umpire 1997–2008, replay official 2009–2021 (died during 2021 season); Ed Marion (1960–1987) head linesman (ejected Walter Payton from 1980 Bears-Falcons game); Ron Marinucci (1997–2017) line judge; Jerry Markbreit (1976–1998) line judge 1976; referee 1977–1998; author of Born to Referee and Last Call: Memoirs of an NFL Referee (only official to work four Super Bowls as referee); Vern Marshall (1976–1988) back judge; line judge; Terry McAulay (1998–2017) side judge 1998–2000; referee 2001–2017; NBC Sports rules analyst 2018–present; Gordon McCarter (1967–1995) line judge 1967; back judge 1968–1973; referee 1974–1995; John McDonough (1960–1973) referee; author of Don't Hit Him, He's Dead (referee of longest game in NFL history, Dolphins-Chiefs divisional playoff on Christmas Day 1971); Bob McElwee (1976–2002) line judge 1976–1979; referee 1980–2002; John McGrath (2002–2021) head linesman 2002–2016, replay official 2017–2021; Art McNally (1959–1967) field judge; referee; Director of Officiating 1968–1990; assistant supervisor of officials 1996–2022 (first official inducted into Pro Football Hall of Fame, 2022); Lloyd McPeters (1993–2002) line judge 1993–1996; back judge 1997; field judge 1998–2002; Leo Miles (1969–1990) head linesman (first African-American to officiate in a Super Bowl); Tim Millis (1988–2001) back judge 1988–1997; field judge 1998–2001; Ben Montgomery (1982–2003) line judge 1982–1983, 1992–2003; umpire 1984–1991; Bob Moore (1984–1996) back judge; Pete Morelli (1997–2018) back judge 1997; field judge 1998–2002; referee 2003–2018; Joe Muha (1956–1971) umpire; George Murphy (1960–1977) head linesman; Tom Myers (1979–1983) umpire; == N == : Larry Nemmers (1985–2007) side judge 1985–1990; referee 1991–2007; Jack Nix (1958–1968) back judge; == O == : Bill O'Brien (1965–1983) field judge; Don Orr (1971–1995) line judge, side judge, field judge; James (Jim) Osborne (1976–1982) judge; == P == : Lou Palazzi (1952–1981) umpire; Keith Parham (2011–2013) side judge; Dave Parry (1975-1989) back judge 1975-77; side judge 1978-89; John Parry (2000–2018) side judge 2000–2006; referee 2007–2018; Monday Night Football rules analyst 2019–2023; Buffalo Bills consultant 2024–present; Mike Pereira (1996–1997) side judge; vice president of officiating (2001–2009); currently NFL on FOX rules analyst; Ron Phares (1985–2012) line judge; Aaron Pointer (1987–2003) head linesman (played in MLB with Houston Colt .45s; brother of The Pointer Sisters of musical fame); Jim Poole (1975–1995) back judge; Eddy Powers (2002–2008) field judge; == Q == : Jim Quirk Sr. (1988–2008) line judge; umpire (father of NFL official Jim Quirk Jr.); == R == : Jack Reader (1970–1973) referee; assistant supervisor of officials 1974–2007; Richard Reels (1993–2012) back judge; George Rennix (1952–1970) referee; Bob Rice (1968–1987) side judge 1968–1987; assistant supervisor of officials 1989–1996 [3]; Jeff Rice (1995–2020) umpire; Alberto Riveron (2004–2012) side judge 2004–2007; referee 2008–2012; vice president of officiating 2017–present; Sanford Rivers (1989–2003) head linesman; Howard Roe (1984–1996) line judge 1984–1988; referee 1989–1996; Larry Rose (1997–2013) side judge; Doug Rosenbaum (2001–2016) side judge 2001–2003, 2012–2013; field judge 2004–2011, 2014–2016; Jimmy Russell (2001–current) side judge 2019, back judge 2020-current; == S == : Tony Sacco (1957–1974) umpire; Steve Sadowski (2012–2018) umpire; Jim Saracino (1995–2008) back judge 1995–1997; field judge 1998–2008; Norm Schachter (1954–1975) referee; author of Close Calls: Confessions of an NFL Referee (referee for Super Bowl I and Ice Bowl); John Schleyer (1990–2009) head linesman; Bill Schmitz (1989–2009) field judge 1989–1997; back judge 1998–2009; Jerry Seeman (1975–1990) head linesman 1975–1978; referee 1979–1990; senior director of officiating 1991–2001; Rick Shavensky (2006–2013) umpire; Tom Sifferman (1986–2008) back judge 1986–1997; field judge 1998–2008 (one of two officials, with Jim Tunney, to officiate consecutive Super Bowls); Fred Silva (1967–1988) line judge 1967; back judge 1968–1969; referee 1969–1988 (referee for Freezer Bowl); Frank Sinkovitz (1958–1983) umpire; Tony Skover (1964–1974) field judge; George A Sladky Sr (1986–1991) replay official; Gary Slaughter (1996–2007) head linesman; Howard Slavin (1987–1999) side judge 1987–1999; replay official 1999–present; Billy Smith (1994–2013) back judge 1994–2013; replay official 2014–present; Bill Spyksma (1995–2002; 2004–2006); Tom Stabile (1995–2014) head linesman; Scott Steenson (1991–2013) back judge 1991–1997; field judge 1998–2013; Mark Steinkerchner (1994–2021) line judge; Tom Stephan (1999–present) line judge; Gene Steratore (2003–2017) field judge 2003–2005; referee 2006–2017; NFL on CBS rules analyst 2018–present; Charles Stewart (1992–2009) line judge; Rex Stuart (1984–1997) umpire; Bill Summers 1967–1971 line judge; Bill Swanson (1965–1977) line judge 1965–1967, 1970–1977; umpire 1968–1969; Fred Swearingen (1960–1980) field judge 1960–1969, 1975–1980; referee 1970–1974; Tom Symonette (2004–2020) line judge 2004–2016; down judge 2017–2020; == T == : Dan Tehan (1933–1964) head linesman; Armen Terzian (1961–1981) back judge 1961–1966, field judge 1967–1981; replay official 1986–1988; Karl Thielscher (1921) umpire; Burl Toler (1965–1989) field judge; head linesman (first African-American official in professional football); Ben Tompkins (1971–1991) back judge; Doug Toole (1988–2006) side judge; Jeff Triplette (1996–2017) field judge 1996–1997; back judge 1998; referee 1999–2017; Jim Tunney (1960–1990) field judge 1960–1966; referee 1967–1990; author, Impartial Judgement (only referee and one of only two officials to work in consecutive Super Bowls); == U == : Larry Upson (1991–1998) line judge; Bernie Ulman (1963–1977) 1963–1967 head linesman, 1968–1977 referee; == V == : Jack Vaughan (1976–2000) back judge; Rob Vernatchi (2004–2016) side judge 2004, 2013–present; field judge 2005–2009; back judge 2010–2016; Jack Vest 1965–1971 referee 1966–71 (died in June 1972 while active); Tony Veteri Sr. (1960–1983) head linesman; Tony Veteri Jr. (1992–2016) head linesman; == W == : Bob Waggoner (1997–2016) field judge 1997, 2010–2014; back judge 1998–2009; side judge 2015–2016; Ed Walker (2014–2017) line judge 2014; head linesman 2015–2017; Dave Warden (1998–2002) field judge; Undrey Wash (2000–2016) umpire; Mike Weatherford (2002–2023) side judge 2002–2014; field judge 2015–2023; Don Wedge (1972–1996) back judge 1972–1975, 1979–1996; referee 1976–1978; Mike Weir (2002–2013) field judge; Samuel A. Weiss (1942–1950); Gordon A. Wells (1972–1993) umpire; Tom White (1989–2005) head linesman 1989; referee 1990–2005; Banks Williams (1978–1994) back judge; Steve Wilson (1999–2009) umpire; Ron Winter (1995–2013) line judge 1995–1997; referee 1998–2013; Paul Weidner (1986–2021) head linesman 1986–2008, replay official (2009–2021); Bob Wortman (1966–1992) field judge (also officiated 1975 NCAA Division I Basketball championship game); David Wyant (1991–2013) side judge; Fred Wyant (1966–1992) line judge 1966–1970, 1990–1992; referee 1971–1989 (former NFL quarterback; referee for Epic in Miami); == X == == Y == == Z == : Steve Zimmer (1997–2021) back judge 1997; field judge 1998–2021 |

== See also ==
- Art McNally Award
- Super Bowl officials
- American Football League officials
