= List of Super Bowl officials =

The Super Bowl officials are the officials chosen for the Super Bowl, the championship game of the National Football League (NFL), the largest and most prestigious professional American football league.

== Selection ==
The NFL's highest-rated official at each position is selected to work the Super Bowl. This is determined by the league using an evaluation system to grade each official's calls during the year. However, only officials who have worked in the league for at least five seasons and have previously worked during the playoffs are eligible to officiate in a Super Bowl. A referee cannot work the Super Bowl at that position until she or he has been a referee for at least three seasons, while also meeting the five-year minimum service requirement.

This has not always been the case. From Super Bowl I to Super Bowl IV, when the game was the "AFL (American Football League)-NFL World Championship Game", the officiating crews consisted of members from both leagues. Then for Super Bowl XXXVIII and Super Bowl XXXIX, the NFL selected the highest rated crew during the regular season. This was a reaction to several officiating mistakes during the 2002–03 playoffs, and the league felt that preserving the familiarity and cohesiveness of the officiating crews during the postseason might reduce the errors.

== List of officials ==
Note: A seven-official system was not used until Super Bowl XIII. Beginning with Super Bowl XXXIII, the league swapped position titles with the field judge and back judge.

=== AFL-NFL World Championships ===
| Game | Date | Referee | Umpire | Head Linesman | Line Judge | Field Judge | Back Judge |
|---|---|---|---|---|---|---|---|
| I | 15 January 1967 | Norm Schachter (NFL) | George Young (AFL) | Bernie Ulman (NFL) | Al Sabato (AFL) | Mike Lisetski (NFL) | Jack Reader (AFL) |
| II | 14 January 1968 | Jack Vest (AFL) | Ralph Morcroft (NFL) | Tony Veteri (AFL) | Bruce Alford (NFL) | Bob Baur (AFL) | Stan Javie (NFL) |
| III | 12 January 1969 | Tom Bell (NFL) | Walt Parker (AFL) | George Murphy (NFL) | Cal Lepore (AFL) | Joe Gonzalez (NFL) | Jack Reader (AFL) |
| IV | 11 January 1970 | John McDonough (AFL) | Lou Palazzi (NFL) | Harry Kessel (AFL) | Bill Schleibaum (NFL) | Charley Musser (AFL) | Tom Kelleher (NFL) |

=== NFL Championships ===
| Game | Date | Referee | Umpire | Down Judge | Line Judge | Field Judge | Back Judge | Side Judge | Replay Official |
|---|---|---|---|---|---|---|---|---|---|
| V | 17 January 1971 | Norm Schachter | Paul Trepinski | Ed Marion | Jack Fette | Fritz Graf | Hugh Gamber | Added in 1978 | —N/a |
| VI | 16 January 1972 | Jim Tunney | Joe Connell | Al Sabato | Art Holst | Bob Wortman | Ralph Vandenberg | Added in 1978 | —N/a |
| VII | 14 January 1973 | Tom Bell | Lou Palazzi | Tony Veteri | Bruce Alford | Tony Skover | Tom Kelleher | Added in 1978 | —N/a |
| VIII | 13 January 1974 | Ben Dreith | Ralph Morcroft | Leo Miles | Jack Fette | Fritz Graf | Stan Javie | Added in 1978 | —N/a |
| IX | 12 January 1975 | Bernie Ulman | Al Conway | Ed Marion | Bruce Alford | Dick Dolack | Ray Douglas | Added in 1978 | —N/a |
| X | 18 January 1976 | Norm Schachter | Joe Connell | Leo Miles | Jack Fette | Bill O'Brien | Stan Javie | Added in 1978 | —N/a |
| XI | 9 January 1977 | Jim Tunney | Lou Palazzi | Ed Marion | Bill Swanson | Armen Terzian | Tom Kelleher | Added in 1978 | —N/a |
| XII | 15 January 1978 | Jim Tunney | Joe Connell | Tony Veteri | Art Holst | Bob Wortman | Ray Douglas | Added in 1978 | —N/a |
| XIII | 21 January 1979 | Pat Haggerty | Art Demmas | Jerry Bergman | Jack Fette | Fred Swearingen | Pat Knight | Dean Look | —N/a |
| XIV | 20 January 1980 | Fred Silva | Al Conway | Burl Toler | Bob Beeks | Charley Musser | Stan Javie | Ben Tompkins | —N/a |
| XV | 25 January 1981 | Ben Dreith | Frank Sinkovitz | Tony Veteri | Tom Dooley | Fritz Graf | Tom Kelleher | Dean Look | —N/a |
| XVI | 24 January 1982 | Pat Haggerty | Al Conway | Jerry Bergman | Bob Beeks | Don Hakes | Bill Swanson | Bob Rice | —N/a |
| XVII | 30 January 1983 | Jerry Markbreit | Art Demmas | Dale Hamer | Bill Reynolds | Don Orr | Dick Hantak | Dave Parry | —N/a |
| XVIII | 22 January 1984 | Gene Barth | Gordon Wells | Jerry Bergman | Bob Beeks | Fritz Graf | Ben Tompkins | Gil Mace | —N/a |
| XIX | 20 January 1985 | Pat Haggerty | Tom Hensley | Leo Miles | Ray Dodez | Bob Lewis | Tom Kelleher | Bill Quinby | —N/a |
| XX | 26 January 1986 | Red Cashion | Ron Botchan | Dale Williams | Bama Glass | Jack Vaughan | Al Jury | Bob Rice | —N/a |
| XXI | 25 January 1987 | Jerry Markbreit | Bob Boylston | Terry Gierke | Bob Beeks | Pat Mallette | Jim Poole | Gil Mace | Art McNally |
| XXII | 31 January 1988 | Bob McElwee | Al Conway | Dale Hamer | Jack Fette | Johnny Grier | Al Jury | Don Wedge | Art McNally |
| XXIII | 22 January 1989 | Jerry Seeman | Gordon Wells | Jerry Bergman | Bob Beeks | Bobby Skelton | Paul Baetz | Gary Lane | Chuck Heberling |
| XXIV | 28 January 1990 | Dick Jorgensen | Hendi Ancich | Earnie Frantz | Ron Blum | Don Orr | Al Jury | Gerald Austin | Al Sabato |
| XXV | 27 January 1991 | Jerry Seeman | Art Demmas | Sid Semon | Dick McKenzie | Jack Vaughan | Banks Williams | Larry Nemmers | Mark Burns |
| XXVI | 26 January 1992 | Jerry Markbreit | Bob Boylston | Dale Williams | Ron Blum | Ed Merrifield | Paul Baetz | Dick Creed | Cal Lepore |
| XXVII | 31 January 1993 | Dick Hantak | Ron Botchan | Ron Phares | Dick McKenzie | Donnie Hampton | Jim Poole | Dean Look | —N/a |
| XXVIII | 30 January 1994 | Bob McElwee | Art Demmas | Sid Semon | Tom Barnes | Don Orr | Al Jury | Nate Jones | —N/a |
| XXIX | 29 January 1995 | Jerry Markbreit | Ron Botchan | Ron Phares | Ron Baynes | Jack Vaughan | Tim Millis | Tom Fincken | —N/a |
| XXX | 28 January 1996 | Red Cashion | John Keck | Paul Weidner | Dale Orem | Don Hakes | Dick Creed | Bill Carollo | —N/a |
| XXXI | 26 January 1997 | Gerald Austin | Ron Botchan | Earnie Frantz | Jeff Bergman | Phil Luckett | Scott Steenson | Tom Fincken | —N/a |
| XXXII | 25 January 1998 | Ed Hochuli | Jim Quirk | John Schleyer | Ben Montgomery | Don Dorkowski | Paul Baetz | Doug Toole | —N/a |
| XXXIII | 31 January 1999 | Bernie Kukar | Jim Daopoulos | Sanford Rivers | Ron Baynes | Tim Millis | Don Hakes | Gary Lane | —N/a |
| XXXIV | 30 January 2000 | Bob McElwee | Ron Botchan | Earnie Frantz | Byron Boston | Al Jury | Bill Leavy | Tom Fincken | Mark Burns |
| XXXV | 28 January 2001 | Gerald Austin | Chad Brown | Tony Veteri, Jr. | Walt Anderson | Bill Lovett | Bill Schmitz | Doug Toole | Dean Blandino |
| XXXVI | 3 February 2002 | Bernie Kukar | Jeff Rice | Mark Hittner | Ron Phares | Pete Morelli | Scott Green | Laird Hayes | Howard Slavin |
| XXXVII | 26 January 2003 | Bill Carollo | Ed Coukart | Dale Williams | Mark Steinkerchner | Tom Sifferman | Don Carey | Rick Patterson | Rex Stuart |
| XXXVIII | 1 February 2004 | Ed Hochuli | Jeff Rice | Mark Hittner | Ben Montgomery | Tom Sifferman | Scott Green | Laird Hayes | Larry Hill |
| XXXIX | 6 February 2005 | Terry McAulay | Carl Paganelli | Gary Slaughter | Mark Steinkerchner | Tom Sifferman | Tony Steratore | Rick Patterson | Al Hynes |
| XL | 5 February 2006 | Bill Leavy | Garth DeFelice | Mark Hittner | Mark Perlman | Steve Zimmer | Bob Waggoner | Tom Hill | Bob Boylston |
| XLI | 4 February 2007 | Tony Corrente | Carl Paganelli | George Hayward | Ron Marinucci | Jim Saracino | Perry Paganelli | John Parry | Mark Burns |
| XLII | 3 February 2008 | Mike Carey | Tony Michalek | Gary Slaughter | Carl Johnson | Boris Cheek | Scott Helverson | Larry Rose | Ken Baker |
| XLIII | 1 February 2009 | Terry McAulay | Roy Ellison | Derick Bowers | Mark Perlman | Greg Gautreaux | Keith Ferguson | Michael Banks | Bob McGrath |
| XLIV | 7 February 2010 | Scott Green | Undrey Wash | John McGrath | Jeff Seeman | Rob Vernatchi | Greg Steed | Greg Meyer | Jim Lapetina |
| XLV | 6 February 2011 | Walt Anderson | Chad Brown | Kent Payne | John Hussey | Doug Rosenbaum | Scott Helverson | Mike Weatherford | Tommy Moore |
| XLVI | 5 February 2012 | John Parry | Carl Paganelli | Tom Stabile | Gary Arthur | Gary Cavaletto | Tony Steratore | Laird Hayes | Larry Nemmers |
| XLVII | 3 February 2013 | Jerome Boger | Darrell Jenkins | Steve Stelljes | Byron Boston | Craig Wrolstad | Dino Paganelli | Joe Larrew | Bill Spyksma |
| XLVIII | 2 February 2014 | Terry McAulay | Carl Paganelli | Jim Mello | Tom Symonette | Scott Steenson | Steve Freeman | Dave Wyant | Earnie Frantz |
| XLIX | 1 February 2015 | Bill Vinovich | Bill Schuster | Dana McKenzie | Mark Perlman | Bob Waggoner | Terrence Miles | Tom Hill | Mike Wimmer |
| 50 | 7 February 2016 | Clete Blakeman | Jeff Rice | Wayne Mackie | Rusty Baynes | Boris Cheek | Keith Ferguson | Scott Edwards | Charles Stewart |
| LI | 5 February 2017 | Carl Cheffers | Dan Ferrell | Kent Payne | Jeff Seeman | Doug Rosenbaum | Todd Prukop | Dyrol Prioleau | Tom Sifferman |
| LII | 4 February 2018 | Gene Steratore | Roy Ellison | Jerry Bergman, Jr. | Byron Boston | Tom Hill | Perry Paganelli | Scott Edwards | Paul Weidner |
| LIII | 3 February 2019 | John Parry | Fred Bryan | Ed Camp | Jeff Bergman | Steve Zimmer | Terrence Miles | Eugene Hall | Jim Lapetina |
| LIV | 2 February 2020 | Bill Vinovich | Barry Anderson | Kent Payne | Carl Johnson | Michael Banks | Greg Steed | Boris Cheek | Mike Chase |
| LV | 7 February 2021 | Carl Cheffers | Fred Bryan | Sarah Thomas | Rusty Baynes | James Coleman | Dino Paganelli | Eugene Hall | Mike Wimmer |
| LVI | 13 February 2022 | Ronald Torbert | Bryan Neale | Derick Bowers | Carl Johnson | Rick Patterson | Scott Helverson | Keith Washington | Roddy Ames |
| LVII | 12 February 2023 | Carl Cheffers | Roy Ellison | Jerod Phillips | Jeff Bergman | John Jenkins | Dino Paganelli | Eugene Hall | Mark Butterworth |
| LVIII | 11 February 2024 | Bill Vinovich | Terry Killens | Patrick Holt | Mark Perlman | Tom Hill | Brad Freeman | Allen Baynes | Mike Chase |
| LIX | 9 February 2025 | Ronald Torbert | Mike Morton | Max Causey | Mark Stewart | Mearl Robinson | Jonah Monroe | Boris Cheek | Kevin Brown |
| LX | 8 February 2026 | Shawn Smith | Roy Ellison | Dana McKenzie | Julian Mapp | Jason Ledet | Greg Steed | Eugene Hall | Andrew Lambert |

Note: Prior to 2017, the Down Judge was known as the Head Linesman.

== Number of appearances ==
Throughout NFL history, five officials have been selected to work five Super Bowls and thirteen have been assigned to four Super Bowls. Jerry Markbreit is the only official to work four Super Bowls as the referee.

| Super Bowl Appearances | Official | Super Bowl(s) |
|---|---|---|
| 5 | Bob Beeks | XIV, XVI, XVIII, XXI, XXIII |
| 5 | Ron Botchan | XX, XXVII, XXIX, XXXI, XXXIV |
| 5 | Jack Fette | V, VIII, X, XIII, XXII |
| 5 | Al Jury | XX, XXII, XXIV, XXVIII, XXXIV |
| 5 | Tom Kelleher | IV, VII, XI, XV, XIX |
| 4 | Al Conway | IX, XIV, XVI, XXII |
| 4 | Art Demmas | XIII, XVII, XXV, XXVII |
| 4 | Fritz Graf | V, VIII, XV, XVIII |
| 4 | Stan Javie | II, VIII, X, XIV |
| 4 | Jerry Markbreit | XVII, XXI, XXVI, XXIX |
| 4 | Tony Veteri | II, VII, XII, XV |
| 4 | Jerry Bergman | XIII, XVI, XVIII, XXIII |
| 4 | Carl Paganelli | XXXIX, XLI, XLVI, XLVIII |
| 4 | Mark Perlman | XL, XLIII, XLIX, LVIII |
| 4 | Tom Hill | XL, XLIX, LII, LVIII |
| 4 | Boris Cheek | XLII, 50, LIV, LIX |
| 4 | Roy Ellison | XLIII, LII, LVII, LX |
| 4 | Eugene Hall | LIII, LV, LVII, LX |

== See also ==
- American Football League Officials
- List of NFL officials
- Official (American football)
- Super Bowl

== Notes and references ==
- Super Bowl Notes, Quotes & Anecdotes: Games I-XL. NFL. 2006. p. 123.
