= Music City Miracle =

2000 event in American football

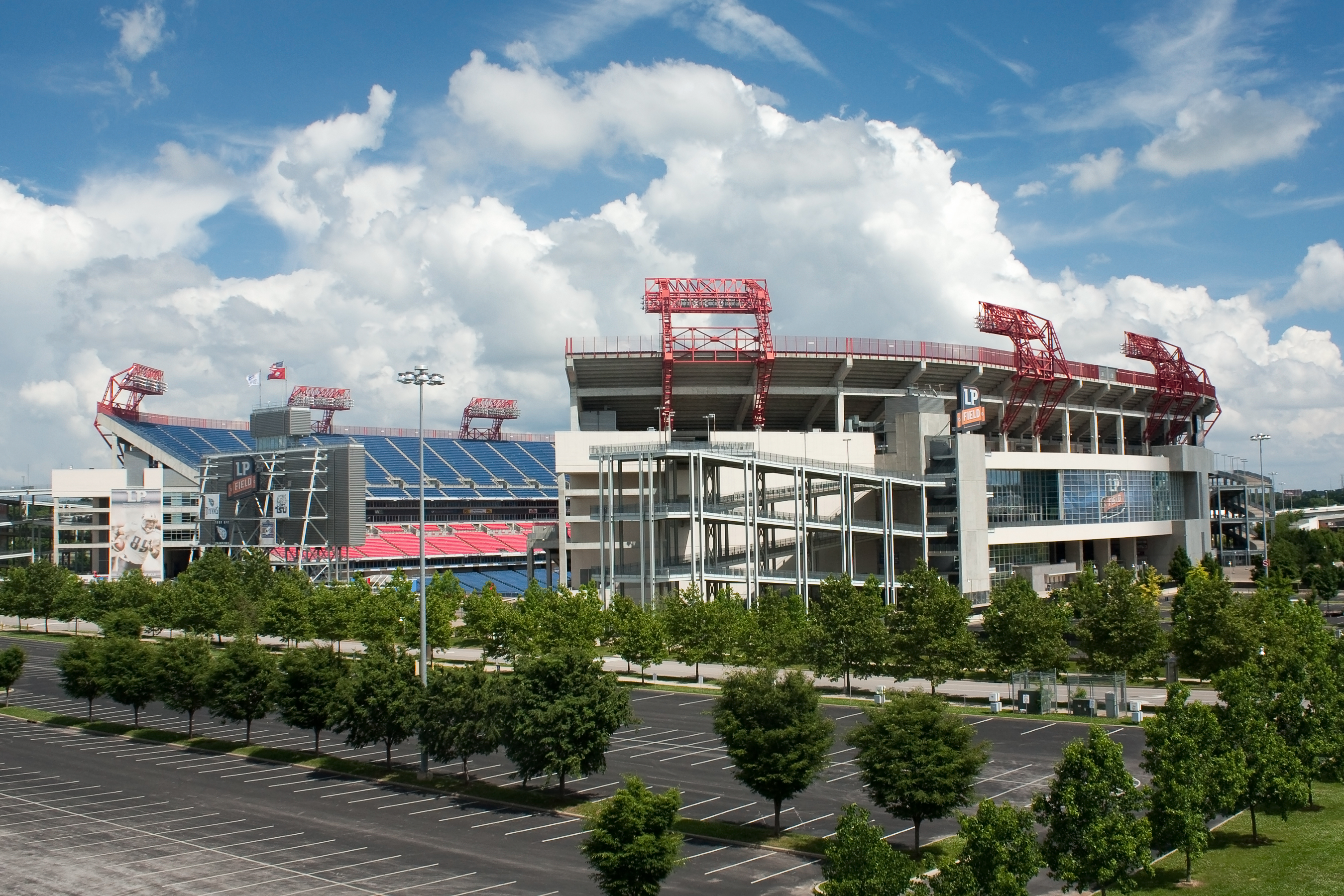
- Adelphia Coliseum, the site of the game
Buffalo Bills (5) (11–5)	Tennessee Titans (4) (13–3)
16	22
Head coach: Wade Phillips	Head coach: Jeff Fisher
	1	2	3	4	Total
BUF	0	0	7	9	16
TEN	0	12	0	10	22
- Date: January 8, 2000
- Stadium: Adelphia Coliseum; Nashville, Tennessee
- Favorite: Titans by 4.5
- Referee: Phil Luckett
- Attendance: 66,782

TV in the United States
- Network: ABC
- Announcers: Mike Patrick, Joe Theismann, and Paul Maguire

The Music City Miracle was an American football play that occurred on January 8, 2000 during the National Football League's 1999–2000 playoffs. It occurred at the end of the American Football Conference Wild Card playoff game between the Tennessee Titans and Buffalo Bills at Adelphia Coliseum (now Nissan Stadium) in Nashville, Tennessee. After the Bills had taken a 16–15 lead on a field goal with 16 seconds remaining in the game, on the ensuing kickoff return, Titans tight end Frank Wycheck threw a lateral pass across the field to Kevin Dyson, who then ran 75 yards to score the winning touchdown to earn a 22–16 victory.

== Background ==
The 1999 Tennessee Titans season was the 40th in franchise history and the first in which the team was identified as the Titans, having previously played as the Oilers. Steve McNair began the year as the team's starting quarterback. However, after an opening-week victory, he was diagnosed with a ruptured disc, and Neil O'Donnell assumed the starting role. O'Donnell led the team to a 4–1 record before McNair returned to finish the season. The team's rushing attack was led by Eddie George, who ran for 1,304 yards and nine touchdowns, earning a Pro Bowl selection. The team leader in targets and receptions was tight end Frank Wycheck, while Kevin Dyson led the team in receiving yards. Rookie defensive end Jevon Kearse, selected with the 16th pick in the 1999 NFL draft, recorded 14.5 sacks and led the NFL with eight forced fumbles, winning Defensive Rookie of the Year at season's end. The Titans finished 13–3, but the Jacksonville Jaguars won the AFC Central with a 14–2 record. Both of the Jaguars' losses came against the Titans. Earning a Wild Card berth in the 1999–2000 playoffs, the Titans had the best record of any team in NFL history to not win its division.

The Buffalo Bills possessed one the NFL's best defenses in 1999. The unit allowed the fewest yards (252.8) and second-fewest points (14.3) per game. Running backs Jonathan Linton and Antowain Smith shared backfield carries, while wide receiver Eric Moulds led the team with 994 receiving yards. Several veteran players who had been a part of the Bills' four consecutive Super Bowl appearances in the early 1990s played minor roles, including Andre Reed, Bruce Smith and Thurman Thomas. The Bills finished 11–5, qualifying for the postseason for the eighth time in the decade.

Prior to the teams' Wild Card game, some fans and media members believed that the winner could be a serious contender to represent the AFC in the Super Bowl.

=== Rob Johnson–Doug Flutie controversy ===
In the days preceding the game, Bills head coach Wade Phillips created a stir by starting quarterback Rob Johnson rather than Doug Flutie. Johnson and Flutie had competed for the starting job since the 1998 season, with Flutie compiling a better record in regular-season competition during 1998 and 1999.

Flutie started the first 15 games of the 1999 season, winning 10. With the Bills' playoff seed assured, Phillips rested Flutie in the final regular season contest. Johnson performed well in Flutie's absence, completing 75% of his passes and throwing for 287 yards and two touchdowns in a dominant victory over the Indianapolis Colts, who had won their previous 11 games. Phillips subsequently named Johnson the starter for the Bills' first-round playoff game. Titans head coach Jeff Fisher said that the decision left him "a little surprised" given that Flutie had been the Bills' starter for the majority of the season. Years later, Phillips wrote that the decision to start Johnson came at the urging of Bills owner Ralph Wilson.

=== Previous playoff meeting ===
The previous playoff game between the two teams had occurred in 1993, when the Titans were known as the Houston Oilers. Held at Rich Stadium in Buffalo, the game became known as The Comeback after the Bills rallied from a 35–3 deficit to win 41–38 in overtime, the largest comeback in NFL history at the time.

== Game summary ==
1999–2000 Wild Card Playoff: Buffalo Bills at Tennessee Titans

Quarter	1	2	3	4	Total
Bills	0	0	7	9	16
Titans	0	12	0	10	22

at Adelphia Coliseum, Nashville, Tennessee

- Date: January 8, 2000
- Game time: 11:30 a.m. CST
- Game weather: 40°F (4°C), Sunny
- Game attendance: 66,782
- Referee: Phil Luckett
- TV announcers (ABC): Mike Patrick, Joe Theismann, and Paul Maguire
- Boxscore

Game information

Second quarter

- TEN: Safety, Jevon Kearse sacked Rob Johnson in end zone
- TEN: Steve McNair 1 yard run (Al Del Greco kick)
- TEN: Del Greco 40 yard FG

Third quarter

- BUF: Antowain Smith 4 yard run (Steve Christie kick)

Fourth quarter

- BUF: Smith 1 yard run (pass failed)
- TEN: Del Greco 36 yard FG
- BUF: Christie 41 yard FG
- TEN: Kevin Dyson 75 yard kickoff return (Del Greco kick)

Top passers

- BUF – Rob Johnson – 10/22, 131 YDS, 0 TD, 0 INT
- TEN – Steve McNair – 13/24, 76 YDS, 0 TD, 1 INT

Top rushers

- BUF – Antowain Smith – 14 CAR, 79 YDS, 2 TD
- TEN – Eddie George – 29 CAR, 106 YDS

Top receivers

- BUF – Peerless Price – 5 REC, 62 YDS
- TEN – Frank Wycheck – 4 REC, 29 YDS

=== First half ===
The Titans opened the scoring in the second quarter when Jevon Kearse sacked Buffalo quarterback Rob Johnson in the end zone for a safety. Johnson struggled against the Titans' defense throughout the game, completing just 10 of 22 passes while being sacked six times, twice by Kearse. Tennessee wide receiver Derrick Mason returned the free kick after the safety 42 yards to the Bills' 28-yard line; Titans quarterback Steve McNair scored on a 1-yard touchdown run to culminate the drive. After their defense forced a punt, the Titans drove 56 yards in 11 plays. Kicker Al Del Greco initially missed a 45-yard field goal attempt, but the Bills were penalized for defensive holding on the play and Del Greco's second attempt was good from 40 yards. The field goal gave the Titans a 12–0 lead at halftime, with the Bills having gained just 64 yards of offense while surrendering 44 yards on penalties.

=== Second half ===
In the second half, the Bills rallied. On Buffalo's first play of the third quarter, Antowain Smith ran for 44 yards, sparking a 62-yard drive that ended with Smith's four-yard touchdown run. Later in the quarter, Antoine Winfield Sr. intercepted a pass near midfield, but the Bills were unable to capitalize on the good field position, their subsequent drive resulting in a three-and-out. Following a Tennessee punt, the Bills received possession with 41 seconds remaining in the third quarter. They drove 65 yards, including a 37-yard completion from Johnson to Eric Moulds and aided by a red zone roughing-the-passer penalty on Kearse. Smith finished the drive with a one-yard touchdown run, giving the Bills a 13–12 lead after a failed two-point conversion attempt. The teams then traded punts in what had become a low-scoring, defensive game. The Bills managed 219 total yards on offense during the game, while the Titans were limited to just 194, most of which were gained by running back Eddie George, who accounted for 106 yards on 29 rushing attempts and another four yards on two receptions.

Tennessee received possession with 6:15 remaining in the game. Titans receiver Isaac Byrd's 16-yard punt return gave the Titans good field position at the Bills' 45-yard line. On the second play of the drive, the Titans received a break when a McNair pass bounced off of linebacker John Holecek's elbow and into the hands of Frank Wycheck for a completion. The drive culminated in a 36-yard field goal by Del Greco, giving the Titans a 15–13 lead with 1:48 remaining. The ensuing Buffalo drive began at the Bills' 39-yard line after a 33-yard kickoff return by Kevin Williams. Johnson began the drive with a completion to rookie wide receiver Peerless Price for 14 yards and a first down. After an incomplete pass, a 12-yard run by Jonathan Linton gave the Bills a first down on the Titans' 35-yard line with under a minute to play. On the next play from scrimmage, Johnson lost a shoe in a scramble, and with the clock running, he had no time to put it back on. With only one shoe, Johnson rolled out and completed a pass to Price, who broke a tackle and ran out of bounds at the 24-yard line with 20 seconds left. Wade Phillips dispatched the field-goal unit for a 41-yard attempt. Bills kicker Steve Christie, who had made the deciding field goal in overtime to cap the Bills' comeback win in the previous playoff meeting between the teams, converted the try. The Bills led 16–15 with 16 seconds remaining.

=== The play ===
Kevin Dyson receiving the lateral pass

The kickoff-return play was named Home Run Throwback by the Titans and was developed by special teams coordinator Alan Lowry. He had learned the play in 1982 as a member of the Dallas Cowboys coaching staff, watching SMU execute a similar kickoff return to score the winning touchdown in the final seconds of its game at Texas Tech. The Titans had practiced the play once per week during the regular season. The practices usually involved starting kick returner Derrick Mason; however, he had suffered an injury earlier in the playoff game and was unavailable for the final seconds. The second option for the play, Anthony Dorsett, was suffering from cramps and was also unavailable for the play. As a result, the Titans designated Isaac Byrd as their main option to retrieve the lateral pass, with Kevin Dyson trailing behind him. As one of the team's leading wide receivers, Dyson rarely practiced with the special-teams unit and was unfamiliar with the layout of the play. Head coach Jeff Fisher briefed Dyson just before the play.

After observing Frank Wycheck playing a throwing game during downtime at practice, Titans offensive coordinator Les Steckel had designed an option pass play with Wycheck in mind. The Titans ran that play against the Atlanta Falcons during the 1999 regular season, and Wycheck threw a 61-yard touchdown pass. After the success of this play, Lowry assigned Wycheck to throw the lateral on Home Run Throwback.

Because the Bills defense had accumulated a large number of injuries, the team's coaches asked for volunteers to cover the kickoff. As a result, numerous defensive starters, who were inexperienced on special teams, were in the game on the play. Initially, the Bills planned on kicking the ball deep, but special-teams coordinator Bruce DeHaven suggested a pooch kick, in which the ball is kicked higher and shorter than in a regular kickoff to limit the opportunity for a runback.

Steve Christie executed the pooch and the kick was fielded by Lorenzo Neal, who handed the ball backward to Wycheck. Bills defenders converged on Wycheck on the right side of the field, breaking their running lanes in the process. As devised, Wycheck threw the ball across the field to Dyson. As Dyson caught the ball, the momentum of the play abruptly shifted to the left, catching every Bills defender except Christie out of position. Dyson thus had an open path in front of him and ran 75 yards into the end zone for the go-ahead touchdown with three seconds remaining.

Dyson and Byrd are deep. Taken by Neal. He gets it to Wycheck, Wycheck – that looked like a forward pass! Taken by Dyson. Dyson's down the sideline – Dyson's going to go all the way! And there is no flag!

— Mike Patrick on ABC's TV broadcast

Do the Titans have a miracle left in them in what has been a magical season to this point? If they do, they need it now. Christie kicks it high and short. Gonna be fielded by Lorenzo Neal at the 25, pitches it back to Wycheck, he throws it across the field to Dyson...(Color commentator Pat Ryan: "He's got something, he's got something...") 30, 40, 50, 40...(Ryan: "He's got it, he's got it, he's got it!") 20, 10, 5 – end zone! Touchdown Titans! There are no flags on the field! It's a miracle! Tennessee has pulled a miracle! A miracle for the Titans!

— Mike Keith on the Titans Radio Network broadcast

The play was reviewed by replay officials to determine whether Wycheck's throw had been a lateral, as had been called by referee Phil Luckett's crew. If the pass had gone forward, the Titans would have been penalized at the spot of the throw and the touchdown would not have counted. Luckett upheld the call on the field, and the touchdown stood. Buffalo was unable to score on the Titans' subsequent kickoff and the game ended in a 22–16 Tennessee victory.

Dyson later said that upon crossing midfield, he considered running out of bounds in field goal range, as the Titans only needed a field goal to win the game. However, upon observing that the only player with a chance of tackling him was Christie, who was being blocked by two players, Dyson proceeded to the end zone.

== Officials ==
- Referee: Phil Luckett (#59)
- Umpire: Bob Wagner (#100)
- Head linesman: Mark Hittner (#28)
- Line judge: Byron Boston (#18)
- Field judge: Al Jury (#106)
- Side judge: Tommy Moore (#60)
- Back judge: Kirk Dornan (#6)

== Aftermath ==
=== Immediate ===
The victory advanced the Titans to the AFC Divisional Round for the first time since 1993, when they were based in Houston. Subsequent victories over the Indianapolis Colts and the Jacksonville Jaguars sent the Titans to Super Bowl XXXIV to face the St. Louis Rams. The Titans lost the Super Bowl in a close game that was decided on the final play, known as "One Yard Short" or "The Tackle".

The Bills fired special teams coordinator Bruce DeHaven, who had been with the team for 13 seasons. DeHaven was subsequently hired by the San Francisco 49ers and was eventually rehired by the Bills for three seasons beginning in 2010. DeHaven's replacement in 2000, Ronnie Jones, was criticized for his performance by team owner Ralph Wilson. Despite possessing the ninth-best offense and third-best defense in the league, the 2000 Bills finished 8–8 and missed the playoffs. (Note: The Bills' record included a 16–13 win over the Titans in the first week of the season.) Wilson demanded that Jones be fired as a result. When head coach Wade Phillips refused to do so, Wilson fired both Jones and Phillips. Phillips was succeeded by Titans defensive coordinator Gregg Williams.

=== Long-term effect on the Bills ===
The Music City Miracle was the last game in a Bills uniform for the remaining key members of the team's 1990s Super Bowl runs. Andre Reed, Bruce Smith and Thurman Thomas were all released by the team in the offseason; all three would eventually be inducted into the Pro Football Hall of Fame.

Starting in 2000, the Bills missed the playoffs in 17 consecutive seasons, a streak that had become the longest active playoff drought in major American sports when it ended. The streak was eventually known as the "Curse of Doug Flutie" under the assumption that Phillips had cursed the Bills by benching Flutie before the Music City Miracle game. The Curse of Flutie moniker was also applied to subsequent failures, particularly at the quarterback position, of teams that employed Phillips. Ralph Wilson died on March 25, 2014, and the team was sold by his estate to Terry and Kim Pegula. Buffalo's playoff drought ended during the 2017 season, three years after the Pegulas assumed ownership of the franchise. (Note: The Bills' first playoff win after the Music City Miracle did not occur until January 9, 2021, following the 2020 season.) The Bills, needing and receiving additional help to clinch their playoff spot, won their final game of the season 22-16 over the Miami Dolphins, the same final score as that of the Music City Miracle game.

The Music City Miracle became one of a series of infamous moments in Buffalo sports history, including "Wide Right", No Goal" and "13 Seconds". Many Bills fans refuse the Music City Miracle name, instead calling the play "The Immaculate Deception" or similar names that imply that Wycheck's lateral traveled forward. In his 2017 autobiography Son of Bum, Phillips called the play "The Music City Mistake".

=== Legacy ===
In 2004, NFL Films hired a computer analyst to determine whether the call on the field of a backward lateral was correct. The analyst determined that the ball had not traveled forward and that the referee's call was correct.

During the NFL's centennial season in 2019, the Bills–Titans matchup in Week 5 was designated as one of 16 weekly games commemorating notable events in NFL history. In that game, the Titans were denied a go-ahead touchdown in the fourth quarter after it was determined that quarterback Marcus Mariota had crossed the line of scrimmage prior to making a forward pass to the end zone. The Bills won the game 14–7.

During their win over the Bills in 2021, the Titans attempted a lateral play during a first-quarter punt return. After corralling the punt, Titans returner Chester Rogers threw the ball to teammate Chris Jackson, who advanced the ball 22 yards before being tackled. However, the play was nullified by an illegal forward pass penalty, as Rogers' lateral had advanced five yards downfield.

== See also ==
- The Play (American football)
- 2007 Trinity vs. Millsaps football game
- River City Relay
- Miracle in Miami
- List of nicknamed NFL games and plays
