= Fútbol Americano =

First NFL regular season game played outside the U.S., in Mexico

- Fútbol Americano logo
San Francisco 49ers (1–3)	Arizona Cardinals (1–3)
14	31
Head coach: Mike Nolan	Head coach: Dennis Green
	1	2	3	4	Total
SF	14	0	0	0	14
ARI	0	12	6	13	31
- Date: October 2, 2005
- Stadium: Estadio Azteca; Mexico City
- Referee: Ed Hochuli
- Attendance: 103,467

TV in the United States
- Network: ESPN
- Announcers: Mike Patrick, Joe Theismann, and Paul Maguire

"Fútbol Americano" was the marketing name used for the first National Football League (NFL) regular season game held outside the United States. Played on October 2, 2005, at Estadio Azteca in Mexico City, the Arizona Cardinals defeated the San Francisco 49ers, 31–14. The game drew an NFL regular season record of 103,467 paid fans.

The name "Fútbol Americano" is Spanish for "American football," a term used to distinguish it from fútbol, which is Spanish for association football (soccer in American English). Fútbol is an approximation of the English word "football" in Spanish phonology; a more literal translation of "foot ball" is balompié, a calque term that is not used in Spanish-speaking countries other than for stylistic purposes in media.

== Background ==
Beginning in 1986, the league held a series of annual preseason exhibition games, called American Bowls, that were held at international sites outside the United States. Several years later in his annual news conference prior to Super Bowl XXXIX in February 2005, NFL Commissioner Paul Tagliabue announced that the league was considering holding regular season games outside the United States, with Toronto and Mexico City as the primary candidates.

In March, the league announced that the first NFL regular season game outside the United States was to be played on October 2, with the Cardinals facing the 49ers in Mexico City. It was scheduled as a home game for the Cardinals, mostly because the team rarely sold out at their then-home field, Sun Devil Stadium in Tempe, Arizona.

To mark this historic game, all NFL players during that weekend wore "Fútbol Americano" stickers on their helmets, while "Fútbol Americano" banners were placed in all league stadia. (In the 2012 season, home team stadia had "Fútbol Americano" stencils, goalpost wraps and banners placed in honor of National Hispanic Heritage Month.) The league does not consider this 49ers–Cardinals game in Mexico City as an "American Bowl" and does not list it as part of the NFL International Series (see below).

== Game summary ==
The San Francisco 49ers got all the momentum, scoring two fumble returns for touchdowns and taking a 14–0 lead with 7:57 to play in the first quarter. However, San Francisco would never score again. In the second quarter, the Arizona Cardinals scored two field goals and a 17-yard touchdown pass to wide receiver Larry Fitzgerald with an unsuccessful two-point conversion to still trail 14–12 at halftime. Kicker Neil Rackers, who scored two field goals in the second quarter, scored two more in the third to take an 18–14 lead. Arizona then dominated the fourth quarter, as they scored a field goal (21–14), a touchdown (28–14), and another field goal to win the game, 31–14.

The football used on the opening kickoff was later sent to the Pro Football Hall of Fame.

== Scoring summary ==
- 1st Quarter
  - SF – D. Smith fumble recovery in end zone (J. Nedney kick), 14:51 49ers 7–0.
  - SF – D. Johnson 78 yd. fumble return (J. Nedney kick), 7:57 49ers 14–0.
- 2nd Quarter
  - ARI – FG N. Rackers 40, 8:46 49ers 14–3. Drive: 12 plays, 66 yards, 4:56.
  - ARI – FG N. Rackers 45, 2:44 49ers 14–6. Drive: 8 plays, 50 yards, 3:55.
  - ARI – L. Fitzgerald 17 pass from J. McCown (pass failed), 0:05 49ers 14–12. Drive: 7 plays, 69 yards, 1:03.
- 3rd Quarter
  - ARI – FG N. Rackers 48, 8:57 Cardinals 15–14. Drive: 6 plays, 47 yards, 3:17.
  - ARI – FG N. Rackers 23, 2:41 Cardinals 18–14. Drive: 8 plays, 44 yards, 4:04.
- 4th Quarter
  - ARI – FG N. Rackers 43, 13:14 Cardinals 21–14. Drive: 7 plays, 26 yards, 3:02.
  - ARI – A. Boldin 27 pass from J. McCown (N. Rackers kick), 8:29 Cardinals 28–14. Drive: 5 plays, 35 yards, 2:47.
  - ARI – FG N. Rackers 24, 6:00 Cardinals 31–14. Drive: 4 plays, 7 yards, 1:41.

== Officials ==
- Referee: Ed Hochuli (#85)
- Umpire: Steve Wilson (#29)
- Head linesman: Mark Hittner (#28)
- Line judge: Tom Symonette (#100)
- Field judge: Tom Sifferman (#118)
- Side judge: Alberto Riveron (#57)
- Back judge: Scott Helverson (#93)

== Aftermath ==
After the success of the 2005 Fútbol Americano game, the NFL began holding more regular season games outside the United States. Beginning with the 2007 season, the league has hosted games every year at London's Wembley Stadium in a series known as the International Series. The series expanded to a second London venue in 2016 with a game at Twickenham Stadium. Starting in 2018, the primary venue for International Series games switched from Wembley to Tottenham Hotspur Stadium. From 2008 to 2013, the Buffalo Bills played one regular season game at Toronto's Rogers Centre in what was known as the Bills Toronto Series.

As of 2016, the 2005 Fútbol Americano game was one of only four NFL games played outside the US to have aired on American national television, the others being a New York Jets–Buffalo Bills game in Toronto in 2009, which aired on NFL Network; a Detroit Lions–Atlanta Falcons game in 2014 in London that started at 9:30 a.m. ET and was broadcast nationally on Fox; and an International Series game between the Houston Texans and Oakland Raiders in 2016 held at Estadio Azteca in Mexico City and televised by ESPN. The latter game was the first Monday Night Football game held outside the U.S.

All other games in the Bills Toronto Series and NFL International Series have been regionally televised like any other NFL Sunday afternoon game.

== References and notes ==
- Weir, Tom (October 3, 2005). "Cardinals deep-six 49ers in historic tilt in Mexico". USA Today.
