= Super Bowl XXXIV =

2000 National Football League championship game

St. Louis Rams (1) (NFC) (13–3)	Tennessee Titans (4) (AFC) (13–3)
23	16
Head coach: Dick Vermeil	Head coach: Jeff Fisher
	1	2	3	4	Total
STL	3	6	7	7	23
TEN	0	0	6	10	16
- Date: January 30, 2000
- Kickoff time: 6:25 p.m. EST (UTC-5)
- Stadium: Georgia Dome; Atlanta, Georgia
- MVP: Kurt Warner, quarterback
- Favorite: Rams by 7
- Referee: Bob McElwee
- Attendance: 72,625

Ceremonies
- National anthem: Faith Hill
- Coin toss: Super Bowl IV participants: Bud Grant; Lamar Hunt; Bobby Bell; Paul Krause; Willie Lanier; Alan Page; Jan Stenerud
- Halftime show: Christina Aguilera; Toni Braxton; Phil Collins; Enrique Iglesias; Edward James Olmos

TV in the United States
- Network: ABC
- Announcers: Al Michaels, Boomer Esiason, Lesley Visser, and Lynn Swann
- Nielsen ratings: 43.3 (est. 88.5 million viewers)
- Market share: 63
- Cost of 30-second commercial: $1.9 million

Radio in the United States
- Network: Westwood One
- Announcers: Howard David, Matt Millen, and John Dockery

Super Bowl XXXIV was an American football game played at the Georgia Dome in Atlanta, Georgia, on January 30, 2000, to determine the National Football League (NFL) champion for the 1999 season. The National Football Conference (NFC) champion St. Louis Rams defeated the American Football Conference (AFC) champion Tennessee Titans 23–16 to claim their first Super Bowl win and first NFL championship since 1951. It is the most recent NFL championship in which both teams were seeking their first Super Bowl title.

Both teams were returning to the postseason after struggles and relocation. Led by The Greatest Show on Turf offense, the Rams entered their second Super Bowl appearance with an NFC-best 13–3 regular-season record. Their season marked the franchise's first playoff run since 1989 and first since moving from Los Angeles to St. Louis. The Titans also finished the regular season with a 13–3 record and advanced to their Super Bowl debut as a wild card. In their first season after retiring the franchise's Oilers name, the Titans were making their first playoff run since 1993 and first since moving from Houston to Tennessee.

The Rams scored three field goals by halftime and added a third-quarter touchdown to take a 16–0 lead. The Titans responded with 16 straight points to tie the game near the end of regulation, the first time a Super Bowl team had erased a deficit of more than 10 points. On their ensuing drive, the Rams regained the lead with wide receiver Isaac Bruce's 73-yard touchdown. Super Bowl XXXIV is best remembered for its final play, in which the Titans reached the Rams' 10-yard line with six seconds remaining, but linebacker Mike Jones tackled wide receiver Kevin Dyson one yard short of the goal line to prevent a touchdown that could have forced overtime or won the game for the Titans. The play became known as "One Yard Short" and "The Tackle". Rams quarterback Kurt Warner, the first undrafted quarterback to win a Super Bowl, was named Super Bowl MVP after setting Super Bowl records for passing yards (414) and pass attempts without an interception (45). Warner became the sixth player to win Super Bowl MVP and NFL MVP in a single season, a feat that would go unrepeated for 23 seasons.

The game has been called the "Dot-com Super Bowl" for the large amount of advertisements purchased by dot-com companies. Regarded as one of the greatest Super Bowls of all time, it was featured on NFL's Greatest Games as "The Longest Yard".

== Background ==
=== Host selection process ===
NFL owners awarded Super Bowl XXXIV to Atlanta during their October 31, 1996, meeting in New Orleans. A total of five cities submitted bids: Miami (Joe Robbie Stadium), Atlanta (Georgia Dome), Tampa (Raymond James Stadium), Phoenix/Tempe (Sun Devil Stadium), and Los Angeles (Coliseum). The Los Angeles host committee originally was going to partner with Pasadena (Rose Bowl), but switched their plans to the Coliseum after a renovation plan was announced. However, the Los Angeles bid was dismissed when their delegation failed to convince the owners that planned stadium renovations would be completed in time.

Owners initially planned on selecting only two hosts (XXXIII and XXXIV), but decided to name three after strong showings by the respective delegations. Miami, Atlanta, and Tampa were selected to host XXXIII, XXXIV, and XXXV, respectively. This was the second time that Atlanta hosted the game, the first being XXVIII. Atlanta garnered a sympathy vote as Falcons owner Rankin Smith was terminally ill. Due to logistical conflicts, Atlanta would not be able to host the Super Bowl again until 2005, and some NFL owners desired to award the game to the city before Smith died (which occurred nearly a year later in October 1997). Tampa Bay Buccaneers owner Malcolm Glazer protested afterwards, feeling that he had been promised the game after securing funding for a new stadium. As a result, XXXV was added to agenda, and Tampa was selected for that game.

=== St. Louis Rams ===
The Rams entered 1999 having been among the league's stragglers for a decade. The reasons are many, including, some suggest, mismanagement by executive John Shaw. The franchise moved to a taxpayer-funded stadium in St. Louis, Missouri for the 1995 season but continued to struggle. In 1997, the team hired Dick Vermeil as their head coach, bringing him back to the NFL after 15 years of retirement. Vermeil had previously turned the Philadelphia Eagles from one of the worst teams in the league into a Super Bowl team in 1980, but his first two seasons with the Rams were hardly stellar, winning just five games in 1997 and four in 1998.

Little was expected of the Rams for 1999. Indeed, ESPN The Magazine's 1999 NFL preview predicted the Rams would be the worst team in the NFL, worse even than the Cleveland Browns, who had returned as an expansion team that year. Trent Green, who had just been signed as the Rams starting quarterback, suffered a season-ending knee injury in the preseason, making undrafted quarterback Kurt Warner the team's new starter. Warner, who started the season as a backup to Green, had previously played for the Iowa Barnstormers of the Arena Football League and the Amsterdam Admirals of NFL Europe.

The Rams proceeded to shock the NFL with an NFC-best 13–3 regular season record and outscored their opponents 526–242, the highest scoring margin (284) of any Super Bowl champion.

The Rams' high-powered offense, run by offensive coordinator Mike Martz, was nicknamed "The Greatest Show on Turf". In Warner's first NFL season in 1998, he played only one game and threw just 11 passes. But in 1999, he experienced one of the most spectacular seasons ever by a quarterback, recording a passer rating of 109.2, completing 65.1 percent of his passes for 4,353 yards, 41 touchdowns, and just 13 interceptions, and earning the NFL Most Valuable Player Award. Besides Warner, several other Rams compiled significant statistics. Halfback Marshall Faulk, in his first year with the Rams after spending five seasons with the Indianapolis Colts, had the best season of his career and won the NFL Offensive Player of the Year Award, while finishing second in MVP voting to Warner. He scored 12 touchdowns, rushed for 1,381 yards, and recorded a team-leading 87 receptions for 1,048 yards. In all, Faulk gained a record 2,429 total yards and became just the second running back in NFL history to gain over 1,000 yards rushing and receiving in the same season (Roger Craig was the first to do it, in 1985). Faulk held the NFL record for yards from scrimmage in a single season until Tennessee's Chris Johnson broke it in 2009. Faulk wasn't the only weapon at Warner's disposal in 1999. Veteran receiver Isaac Bruce was the top Rams receiver with 77 receptions for 1,165 yards and 12 touchdowns. while breakout rookie wide receiver Torry Holt recorded 52 receptions, 788 yards, and 6 touchdowns. Even the team's third wide receiver, Az-Zahir Hakim, was a big contributor by catching 36 passes for 677 yards and 8 touchdowns, while also returning punts for 461 yards and another touchdown. The Rams' offensive line was led by Pro Bowlers Orlando Pace and Adam Timmerman. Timmerman, acquired by the Rams in 1999, had previously won Super Bowl XXXI with the Green Bay Packers. On special teams, receiver Tony Horne returned 30 kickoffs for 892 yards and 2 touchdowns, giving him an NFL-leading 29.7 yards per return average. Overall, the Rams' offense led the league in total yards gained (6,639), scoring (526 points), and passing touchdowns (42).

The Rams' defense led the league in fewest rushing yards allowed (1,189) and fewest rushing touchdowns allowed (4), while giving up just 242 points. Overall, the defense ranked 4th in the league in fewest total yards (5,056). The line was anchored by Pro Bowl defensive end Kevin Carter and defensive end Grant Wistrom. Carter led the league with 17 sacks, while Wistrom recorded 8.5 sacks and 2 interceptions, returning both for touchdowns and a combined total of 131 yards. Behind them, the Rams had three linebackers: London Fletcher (66 tackles and 3 sacks), Mike Jones (4 interceptions for 96 return yards and 2 touchdowns, and 2 fumble recoveries for 51 return yards and a touchdown), and Todd Collins (72 tackles, a sack, and 2 interceptions for 16 yards). The secondary was led by Pro Bowler Todd Lyght (6 interceptions), Dexter McCleon (4 interceptions), and rookie Dré Bly (3 interceptions).

This was the Rams' first playoff appearance since 1989 and only the second Super Bowl appearance in team history.

=== Tennessee Titans ===
The Titans advanced to their first Super Bowl in team history, after originating as a charter member of the American Football League. From 1960 to 1996, the team was owned by Houston, Texas businessman Bud Adams and known as the Houston Oilers. By 1995, however, Adams, like Rams owner Georgia Frontiere, was lured to move his team from Houston, in this case to a new stadium in Nashville, Tennessee. Since this new stadium was not ready until the 1999 season, Adams decided to move his team to Liberty Bowl Memorial Stadium in Memphis, Tennessee in 1997 after playing before small Houston crowds in 1996.

The renamed Tennessee Oilers also played before sparse Memphis crowds, and thus spent the 1998 season playing at Nashville's Vanderbilt Stadium. After the new Adelphia Coliseum (now known as Nissan Stadium) was completed in 1999, the team's name was changed to the Tennessee Titans. With the Titans' Super Bowl appearance, every former AFL team had now played in the Super Bowl, including the original eight AFL teams and two AFL expansion teams: the Miami Dolphins and the Cincinnati Bengals.

The 1999 Titans were led by quarterback Steve McNair and running back Eddie George. McNair had missed five games due to injuries during the season, but he was still able to put up solid numbers, throwing for 2,179 yards and 12 touchdowns with 8 interceptions. Despite his injury problems, McNair finished the season as the second-leading rusher on the team with 337 yards and 8 touchdowns. When McNair was out with injuries, the team was able to rely on backup quarterback Neil O'Donnell, who threw for 1,382 yards and 10 touchdowns, with only 5 interceptions. George also had an outstanding season, rushing for 1,304 yards, and catching 47 passes for 458 yards (his receptions, receiving yards, and receiving touchdowns were all career highs). In all, George scored a grand total of 13 touchdowns, and was selected to play in the Pro Bowl for the 3rd consecutive year.

Another contributor on the Titans' offense was fullback Lorenzo Neal, who frequently served as George's lead blocker and was widely considered one of the best blocking backs in the league. The team did not have any outstanding deep threats, but wide receiver Yancey Thigpen recorded 38 receptions for 648 yards, wide receiver Kevin Dyson had 54 receptions for 658 yards, and tight end Frank Wycheck caught 69 passes for 641 yards. Thigpen, however, would not play in the Super Bowl because of a right foot fracture he suffered in the AFC Championship Game. Up front, their line was anchored by Pro Bowl tackle Bruce Matthews. On special teams, Derrick Mason racked up 1,030 combined return yards and a touchdown.

The Titans' defense was also extremely effective. Pro Bowl defensive end Jevon Kearse anchored the line, recording 14.5 sacks to go along with 8 forced fumbles and was named the NFL's Defensive Rookie of the Year. The linebackers corps was led by Eddie Robinson, who recorded 64 tackles and 6 sacks, while also recovering and forcing 3 fumbles. Their secondary was led by cornerback Samari Rolle, who led the team with 4 interceptions, and veteran safety Marcus Robertson, who would miss the game with a broken leg.

The Titans finished the regular season with a 13–3 record (including a home win over the Rams), but finished second behind the 14–2 Jacksonville Jaguars (who had the best record in the NFL that season) in the AFC Central. The Jaguars' only two losses were to the Titans, but the Titans' three losses forced them to enter the playoffs as a wild-card team.

=== Playoffs ===
Playing in his first ever NFL playoff game, Warner threw for 395 yards and 5 touchdowns, with 1 interception, as the Rams defeated the Minnesota Vikings, 49–37 in St. Louis, by scoring 35 unanswered points in the second half. Bruce caught 4 passes for 133 yards and a touchdown. Faulk gained 101 combined rushing/receiving yards and scored 2 touchdowns. Although Vikings quarterback Jeff George threw for 423 yards and 4 touchdowns, three of his scores occurred late in the 4th quarter, after the Rams had already put the game away.

The Rams then narrowly defeated the Tampa Bay Buccaneers, 11–6 at home, in a hard-fought defensive struggle in the NFC Championship Game. The first half ended with the Rams leading 5–3 on a Jeff Wilkins field goal and after a bad snap by the Buccaneers went through their own end zone for a safety. The Buccaneers then scored a field goal in the 3rd quarter to take the lead. But Warner threw a 30-yard go-ahead touchdown pass to receiver Ricky Proehl with 4:44 left in the game.

Meanwhile, the Titans started out their postseason by narrowly defeating the Buffalo Bills, 22–16 in Nashville, on a famous, trick kickoff return play that became known in NFL lore as the Music City Miracle. The Titans jumped to a 12–0 halftime lead with an Al Del Greco field goal, a safety by Kearse, and a McNair touchdown run. However, the Bills came back to take the lead, 13–12 with Antowain Smith's two touchdown runs in the second half (the two-point conversion after Smith's second touchdown failed). In the 4th quarter, the Titans regained the lead after Del Greco kicked his second field goal. With 16 seconds left in the game, Bills kicker Steve Christie made what seemed to be the game-winning 41-yard field goal to give his team the lead, 16–15. However, Neal received the ensuing kickoff and handed the ball off to Wycheck, who then lateraled the ball to Dyson on the other side of the field, who eventually ran 75 yards to the end zone for the game-winning touchdown. The play was reviewed to determine whether Wycheck had lateraled the ball to Dyson or made an illegal forward pass. Referee Phil Luckett upheld the original call on the field of a touchdown, giving the Titans the win.

The Titans then defeated the Indianapolis Colts, 19–16 in Indianapolis. After both teams exchanged field goals in the first half, George scored on a 68-yard touchdown run to give his team a 13–9 lead. Del Greco then kicked two more field goals in the 4th quarter to put the game away. George finished the game with a franchise playoff record 162 rushing yards and a touchdown, while Del Greco made four field goals.

The Titans then eliminated the Jacksonville Jaguars, 33–14, in the AFC Championship Game at Jacksonville. The Jaguars finished the 1999 regular season with a league-best 14–2 record, and advanced to the AFC title game after crushing the Miami Dolphins 62–7 and limiting future Hall of Fame quarterback Dan Marino to just 11 of 25 completions for 95 yards and 1 touchdown, with 2 interceptions. However, the Titans' defense dominated the Jaguars in the AFC Championship Game, forcing 6 turnovers. The Jaguars led 14–10 at halftime, but the Titans then scored 23 unanswered points on two touchdown runs by McNair, a safety, and Derrick Mason's 80-yard kickoff return for a touchdown. Although McNair passed for only 112 yards and one touchdown with one interception, he rushed for 91 yards and 2 touchdowns on 9 carries. George rushed for 86 yards and caught 3 passes for 19 yards.

== Pre-game notes ==
In January 2000, two ice storms struck the Atlanta area within a week of each other. The second storm occurred during the week the Super Bowl was hosted. Despite the rare adverse weather conditions, city and state crews kept streets and sidewalks free of ice, and MARTA public transport kept running. The Atlanta region does not receive more ice storms than most other areas of the country, and Super Bowl XXXIV was played indoors and unaffected by the elements. But some residents believe the poor weather during Super Bowl week negatively impacted the city's chances of hosting another Super Bowl, including the bid it lost for Super Bowl XLIII. That bid included meteorological data showing the rarity of such storms in the area. They eventually got the bid to host Super Bowl LIII.

Nashville, home of the Titans, is also the midway point of the Atlanta-St. Louis highway corridor, which contains the entirety of Interstate 24, and uses parts of Interstate 57, Interstate 64 and Interstate 75 to complete the route.

It is the most recent Super Bowl in which neither participating team had already won a Super Bowl.

The Titans, as the designated home team, wore navy blue jerseys with white pants. The Rams wore white uniforms with yellow pants, which would be the final appearance for these uniforms before rebranding to a new Millennium Blue/New Century Gold combination the next season.

== Broadcasting ==
ABC televised the game in the United States, with play-by-play announcer Al Michaels and color commentator Boomer Esiason. Chris Berman from Disney-owned corporate sibling ESPN hosted all the events. Berman was joined by fellow ESPN analyst Steve Young, while ESPN's Mike Tirico was on hand for the post-game presentation of the Vince Lombardi Trophy. Lesley Visser and Lynn Swann served as sideline reporters. Other contributors included Dan Fouts, Jimmy Roberts, Bob Griese and Brent Musburger (who introduced a special memorial tribute to Walter Payton, who had died from bile duct cancer the previous November).

This was Esiason's only Super Bowl as a color commentator on television. ABC Sports would fire him a little over a month later in early March, with the reason being for his dismissal was simply his poor chemistry and hatred of Michaels (Michaels himself also hated Esiason). Esiason would then serve as the lead color commentator for Westwood One radio, calling Super Bowls XXXV (the game played the following year) to LII.

This was the first Super Bowl to be aired in high definition and 5.1 Dolby Digital. ABC chose to use the 720p format.The game was later featured as one of the NFL's Greatest Games as The Longest Yard.

The game attracted an average of 88.5 million viewers, with an 43.3 rating and 63% share on ABC. Also, In Canada an estimated nation-wide viewership of 3.1 million watched the game.

=== Advertising ===
This game is often referred to as the "dot-com" Super Bowl since it was held during the height of the dot-com bubble, and several Internet companies purchased television commercials. Among them, E-Trade's commercial featured a chimpanzee dancing in an E-Trade T-shirt and the text "Well, we just wasted 2 million bucks". Lifeminders.com ran a commercial of plain typewritten text beginning with the line "This is the worst commercial on the Super Bowl. But it might be the best thing you see tonight." Pets.com famously paid millions for an advertisement featuring a sock puppet, though the company would collapse before the end of the year.

== Entertainment ==
=== Pregame ceremonies ===
The pregame show featured a tribute to "The Great American Music of the 20th Century". Narrated by the Smothers Brothers, the show highlighted some of the unique American musical styles such as gospel, big band, classical, country and rock. Singers Tina Turner and Travis Tritt along with the Georgia Tech Marching Band and the Georgia Mass Choir performed during the show.

Country singer Faith Hill then sang the national anthem.

To celebrate the 30th anniversary of Super Bowl IV, the following participants of the game were featured during the coin toss ceremony: Bud Grant, Lamar Hunt, Bobby Bell, Paul Krause, Willie Lanier, Alan Page, and Jan Stenerud.

=== Halftime show ===
The E-Trade Super Bowl Halftime Show was produced by Disney and titled "Tapestry of Nations" after the Epcot parade of the same name. The show, narrated by actor Edward James Olmos, was inspired by the Walt Disney World Millennium Celebration. It featured a full symphony orchestra conducted by Steven Byess; a multi-generational, 80-person choir; and singers Phil Collins, Christina Aguilera, Enrique Iglesias, and Toni Braxton.

== Game summary ==
External videos
- Full game broadcast on ABC on YouTube

=== First half ===
Both teams' defenses seemed to dominate most of the first half. The Rams started the game out strong by taking the opening kickoff and marching to the Titans' 17-yard line, which featured a 17-yard completion on 3rd-and-7 from quarterback Kurt Warner to wide receiver Isaac Bruce. But on 3rd-and-9 at the 17, safety Blaine Bishop pressured Warner to throw an incomplete pass. Then the ensuing 35-yard field goal attempt by kicker Jeff Wilkins failed when punter/holder Mike Horan fumbled the snap and was tackled by cornerback Donald Mitchell, giving the ball to Tennessee on their own 29-yard line. The Titans responded by moving the ball to the Rams' 29-yard line, aided by running back Eddie George's 32-yard reception from quarterback Steve McNair. However, they also came up empty after kicker Al Del Greco missed a 47-yard field goal attempt wide left.

For the rest of the half, the Titans were forced to punt on all of their possessions. Meanwhile, the Rams were able to reach inside the Titans' 20-yard line on all four of their remaining drives before halftime, but on each one, the Titans' defense forced the Rams to settle for field goal attempts by Wilkins, who made three out of four attempts from 27, 29, and 28 yards, respectively (his only miss was his second attempt, a 34-yarder that sailed wide right, on the third play of the second quarter). Wilkins' three field goals gave the Rams a 9–0 halftime lead, but their scoring margin over the Titans seemed somewhat small, considering they drove into scoring range on every one of their first-half possessions and outgained the Titans in total yards, 294–89. In addition, Warner was ailing after taking several big hits from the Titans' blitzing defense, and Rams head coach Dick Vermeil considered replacing him at halftime for backup Paul Justin, who had only thrown 14 passes all season; Warner, however, never missed a snap.

=== Third quarter ===
Both teams' offenses started to get going in the second half. The Titans took the opening kickoff and drove 43 yards to the Rams' 29-yard line, but still came up empty after Rams cornerback Todd Lyght blocked Del Greco's 47-yard field goal attempt. After that, Warner converted 3rd-and-7 with an 8-yard completion to running back Marshall Faulk, then threw a 31-yard strike to Bruce and a 16-yard completion to tight end Ernie Conwell before finishing the 8-play, 68-yard drive with a 9-yard touchdown pass to wide receiver Torry Holt, increasing the Rams' lead to 16–0. Bishop combined with safety Anthony Dorsett to tackle Conwell, but suffered a spinal injury and had to leave the game. The game was delayed for several minutes while Bishop was being treated. Already without fellow injured starting safety Marcus Robertson, Dorsett and Perry Phenix had to fill in for him and Bishop the rest of the game. After the Rams' touchdown, Titans head coach Jeff Fisher said to his team, "They're celebrating! They're celebrating right now! Look at them! Go win the game!"

The Titans finally got on the board with a 12-play, 66-yard scoring drive. Wide receiver Derrick Mason returned the ensuing kickoff 35 yards to the 34-yard line. From there, five runs by George for 24 yards, three completions from McNair to tight end Frank Wycheck for 15 yards and a 2-yard run by McNair advanced the ball to the Rams' 25-yard line. Then McNair scrambled 23 yards to the 2-yard line, setting up a 1-yard touchdown run by George two plays later, cutting the Titans' deficit to 16–6 after McNair's pass to Wycheck on the two-point conversion attempt fell incomplete.

=== Fourth quarter ===
The Titans' first score sparked them to rally. After forcing the Rams to punt on their ensuing possession, a pair of 21-yard completions from McNair to wide receiver Isaac Byrd and tight end Jackie Harris aided a 13-play, 79-yard drive that was capped by George's second touchdown of the game, a 2-yard run, to cut the Titans' deficit to 16–13. The Titans' defense then forced the Rams to a three-and-out, and Horan's 30-yard punt gave the Titans the ball back at their 47-yard line. The Titans' offense then drove only 28 yards on their ensuing possession, but it was close enough for Del Greco to kick a 43-yard field goal, tying the score at 16–16 with just 2:12 left in regulation. The 16–0 deficit was the largest deficit to be erased in a Super Bowl and the first greater than 10 points. It was also the first time in any Super Bowl a team down double digits in the fourth quarter came back to tie the game.

Then on the first play of the Rams' ensuing drive, Warner threw a long pass that was caught at the Titans' 38-yard line by Bruce, who then went the distance for a 73-yard touchdown reception to give the Rams a 23–16 lead. Likewise, in the 1951 NFL Championship Game, quarterback Norm Van Brocklin's 73-yard game-winning touchdown pass to wide receiver Tom Fears broke a 16–16 tie in the fourth quarter and gave the Rams a seven-point victory to win the NFL title. Warner's touchdown pass to Bruce was his only completion of the fourth quarter.

The Titans took the ball at their own 12-yard line with 1:48 left in the game after committing a holding penalty on the ensuing kickoff. McNair started out the drive with a pair of completions to Mason and Wycheck for gains of 9 and 7 yards to reach the 28-yard line. After an incomplete pass, a face-mask penalty on cornerback Dré Bly while tackling McNair on a 12-yard scramble gave the Titans a new set of downs at the Rams' 45-yard line. On the next play, linebacker Charlie Clemons was penalized for being offside, moving the ball to the 40-yard line with 59 seconds left. McNair ran for 2 yards, then threw a 7-yard completion to wide receiver Kevin Dyson. On the next play, the Rams nearly ended the game when Bly stepped in front of a pass intended for Mason, only to have it go right through his arms. Two plays later, with the Titans facing 3rd-and-5, McNair narrowly avoided a sack by defensive ends Kevin Carter and Jay Williams and completed a 16-yard pass to Dyson to set up 1st-and-goal at the Rams' 10-yard line. The Titans then used up their final timeout with just six seconds left, giving them a chance for one last play to either tie the game and send it into overtime, or go for the two-point conversion for the victory.

==== Final play ====
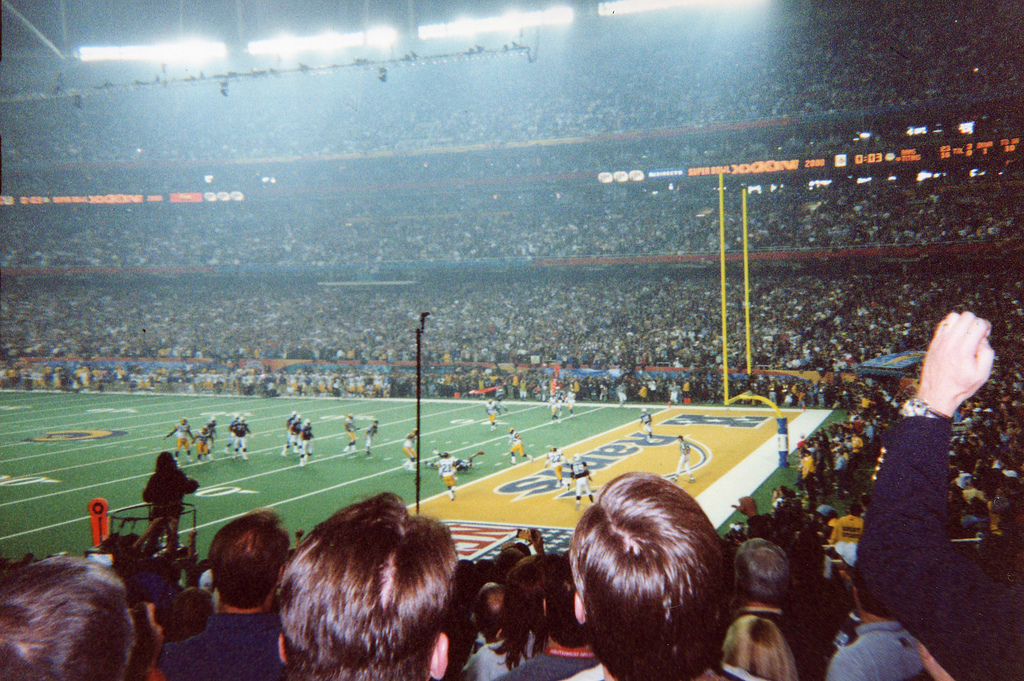
On the final play of Super Bowl XXXIV, Rams' linebacker Mike Jones applies "The Tackle" to Titans receiver Kevin Dyson, who fell one yard short of the goal line.

The game's final play from the Rams' 10-yard line has gone down in NFL history as "The Tackle" or "One Yard Short". The Titans' plan was to use Wycheck as a decoy. The tight end would run straight up the field on the right side, to lure linebacker Mike Jones away from Dyson, who would then slant left through the middle of the field. With Wycheck occupying Jones, McNair would pass the ball to Dyson, who would be open from about five yards out to run in for the score.

Jones, who was the Rams' defensive signal-caller, called a 77 Blast, a combination coverage that can be altered as the offense lines up. When the Titans came to the line, Rams safety Billy Jenkins called for three Rams players — he, Jones, and cornerback Dexter McCleon — to play zone coverage against Wycheck and Dyson.

As the play began, everything appeared to go as planned. Jones initially ran with Wycheck up the field. But as he reached the goal line, he glanced over his left shoulder and noticed an open Dyson catching the ball. Jones switched directions and wrapped up Dyson's legs about two and a half yards short of the end zone.

Both players went into a rolling motion as Dyson stretched his hand with the football towards the end zone, attempting to break the plane of the goal line and score. As the rolling motion came to an end with Jones on top of Dyson's legs, the receiver's shoulder touched the ground, making him down by contact with the ball just inches short of the goal line. At this point, there were 2 seconds left on the clock, but with no timeouts remaining, the Titans could not run another play before time expired. Therefore, the game was over. If Dyson scored and the extra point been converted, it would have been the first Super Bowl to go into overtime. Alternatively, had Dyson scored, the Titans could have attempted a two-point conversion for the outright win on the final play of the game, although Titans head coach Jeff Fisher said in a 2019 interview that he would have taken his chances for overtime.

Because the game had already seen the then-largest comeback in Super Bowl history, "One Yard Short" is considered one of the greatest and most exciting game-ending plays in modern NFL history. The image of Dyson stretching the ball to the goal line with Jones wrapped around him has become a staple of NFL highlights. ESPN.com ranked "One Yard Short" as the 35th-greatest moment of the past 25 years in sports (as of 2007). NFL.com ranked the tackle as the fourth-greatest clutch moment in Super Bowl history. Fox Sports ranked it as the Greatest Clutch Play in Super Bowl History (as of 2007). Like Dallas Cowboys cornerback Larry Brown, Jones was included on the NFL Network's "Top 10 One-Hit Wonders" list (Jones was No. 10, Brown was No. 3), Jones also mirrored Brown in his solid if unspectacular career outside of his Super Bowl heroics.

=== After the game ===
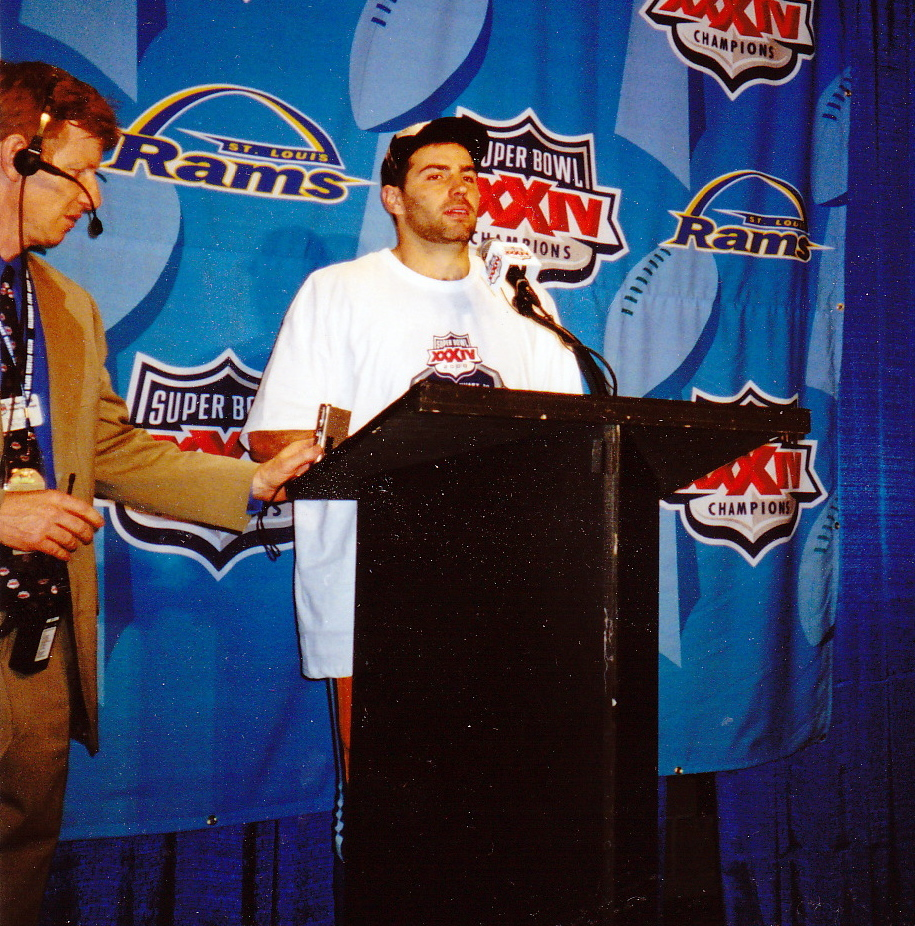
Kurt Warner at the Super Bowl XXXIV post-game press conference.

After the game, many sports writers commented on Warner's rise from an unknown backup to a Super Bowl MVP, but Warner himself wasn't impressed by it. "How can you be in awe of something that you expect yourself to do?" Warner pointed out. "People think this season is the first time I touched a football; they don't realize I've been doing this for years – just not on this level, because I never got the chance. Sure, I had my tough times, but you don't sit there and say, 'Wow, I was stocking groceries five years ago, and look at me now.' You don't think about it, and when you do achieve something, you know luck has nothing to do with it."

However, he later told The New York Times, "I guess it is sort of a storybook ending. When you think about where I was and where I am now, it seems pretty incredible."

The game, via archived footage from the broadcast, is also featured in the ending of Warner's 2021 biopic American Underdog, which stars Zachary Levi as Warner and Dennis Quaid as Vermeil.

=== Box score ===
Super Bowl XXXIV: St. Louis Rams 23, Tennessee Titans 16

Quarter	1	2	3	4	Total
Rams (NFC)	3	6	7	7	23
Titans (AFC)	0	0	6	10	16

at Georgia Dome, Atlanta, Georgia

- Date: January 30, 2000
- Game time: 6:25 p.m. EST
- Game weather: 72 °F (22 °C), played indoors, domed stadium

Scoring summary

Quarter	Time	Drive			Team	Scoring information	Score	
Quarter	Time	Plays	Yards	TOP	Team	Scoring information	STL	TEN
1	3:00	6	54	2:48	STL	27-yard field goal by Jeff Wilkins	3	0
2	4:16	11	73	5:13	STL	29-yard field goal by Wilkins	6	0
2	0:15	14	67	3:23	STL	28-yard field goal by Wilkins	9	0
3	7:20	8	68	3:59	STL	Torry Holt 9-yard touchdown reception from Kurt Warner, Wilkins kick good	16	0
3	0:14	12	66	7:06	TEN	Eddie George 1-yard touchdown run, 2-point pass no good	16	6
4	7:21	13	79	7:15	TEN	George 2-yard touchdown run, Al Del Greco kick good	16	13
4	2:12	8	28	4:05	TEN	43-yard field goal by Del Greco	16	16
4	1:54	1	73	0:18	STL	Isaac Bruce 73-yard touchdown reception from Warner, Wilkins kick good	23	16
"TOP" = time of possession. For other American football terms, see Glossary of American football.							23	16

=== Statistical overview ===
Bruce caught 6 passes for 162 yards (3rd highest) and a touchdown, an average of 27 yards per catch. Holt had 7 receptions for 109 yards (the most ever by a rookie in a Super Bowl) and a touchdown. Bruce and Holt became the fifth pair of teammates to each have over 100 yards receiving in a Super Bowl, joining the Steelers' John Stallworth and Lynn Swann in Super Bowl XIII, the Bengals' Cris Collinsworth and Dan Ross in Super Bowl XVI, the 49ers' Jerry Rice and Roger Craig in Super Bowl XXIII, and the Redskins' Gary Clark and Art Monk in Super Bowl XXVI.

Rams starting running back Marshall Faulk was held to just 17 rushing yards but gained 90 receiving yards on 5 receptions. McNair set a Super Bowl record for rushing yards by a quarterback, recording 64 yards on 8 carries. He also completed 22 out of 36 passes for 214 yards. George finished the game with 95 rushing yards, 35 receiving yards, and 2 touchdowns. Harris was the top receiver for the Titans with 7 catches for 64 yards. Mason returned 5 kickoffs for 122 yards and caught 2 passes for 18 yards.

=== Aftermath ===
Rams coach Dick Vermeil became the oldest coach ever to win a Super Bowl (age 63). He also set the record for the longest amount of time between going to his first Super Bowl (Super Bowl XV in the 1980 season) to winning it for the first time. He retired after this season but came back in 2001 to coach the Kansas City Chiefs, finally retiring for good in 2005.

It was the second (and last) Super Bowl in which neither team committed any turnovers (after Super Bowl XXV).

The Rams became the first, and to date the only, NFL team to win a championship in three different cities. They won the 1945 NFL Championship Game while located in Cleveland, and won both the 1951 NFL Championship Game and Super Bowl LVI in 2021 in Los Angeles. The team would later return to Los Angeles for the 2016 season, leaving St. Louis without an NFL franchise for the first time since 1994.

The Titans finished the 2000 season with another 13–3 record though they fell to the eventual Super Bowl Champion Baltimore Ravens in the AFC Divisional round.

== Final statistics ==
Sources: NFL.com Super Bowl XXXIV, Super Bowl XXXIV Play Finder StL, Super Bowl XXXIV Play Finder Ten, USA Today Super Bowl XXXIV Play by Play

=== Statistical comparison ===
	St. Louis Rams	Tennessee Titans
First downs	23	27
First downs rushing	1	12
First downs passing	18	13
First downs penalty	4	2
Third down efficiency	5/12	6/13
Fourth down efficiency	0/1	1/1
Net yards rushing	29	159
Rushing attempts	13	36
Yards per rush	2.2	4.4
Passing – Completions/attempts	24/45	22/36
Interceptions thrown	0	0
Times sacked-total yards	1–7	1–6
Net yards passing	407	208
Total net yards	436	367
Punt returns-total yards	2–8	1–(–1)
Kickoff returns-total yards	4–55	5–122
Punts-average yardage	2–38.5	3–43.0
Fumbles-lost	2–0	1–0
Penalties-total yards	8–60	7–45
Time of possession	23:34	36:26
Turnovers	0	0

=== Individual leaders ===
Rams passing
	C/ATT^{1}	Yds	TD	INT	Rating
Kurt Warner	24/45	414	2	0	99.7
Rams rushing
	Car^{2}	Yds	TD	LG^{3}	Yds/Car
Marshall Faulk	10	17	0	4	1.70
Robert Holcombe	1	11	0	11	11.00
Kurt Warner	1	1	0	1	1.00
Mike Horan	1	0	0	0	0.00
Rams receiving
	Rec^{4}	Yds	TD	LG^{3}	Target^{5}
Torry Holt	7	109	1	32	11
Isaac Bruce	6	162	1	73	12
Marshall Faulk	5	90	0	52	6
Az-Zahir Hakim	1	17	0	17	5
Ernie Conwell	1	16	0	16	1
Ricky Proehl	1	11	0	11	4
Roland Williams	1	9	0	9	2
Robert Holcombe	1	1	0	1	1
Fred Miller	1	–1	0	–1	1

Titans passing
	C/ATT^{1}	Yds	TD	INT	Rating
Steve McNair	22/36	214	0	0	77.8
Titans rushing
	Car^{2}	Yds	TD	LG^{3}	Yds/Car
Eddie George	28	95	2	13	3.39
Steve McNair	8	64	0	23	8.00
Titans receiving
	Rec^{4}	Yds	TD	LG^{3}	Target^{5}
Jackie Harris	7	64	0	21	8
Frank Wycheck	5	35	0	13	8
Kevin Dyson	4	41	0	16	8
Eddie George	2	35	0	32	4
Isaac Byrd	2	21	0	21	3
Derrick Mason	2	18	0	9	4
Chris Sanders	0	0	0	0	1

^{1}Completions/attempts ^{2}Carries ^{3}Long gain ^{4}Receptions ^{5}Times targeted

=== Records set ===
The following records were set in Super Bowl XXXIV, according to the official NFL.com boxscore, the 2016 NFL Record & Fact Book and the Pro-Football-Reference.com game summary. Some of these records have since been surpassed in subsequent Super Bowl games.

Player records set
Most passing yards, game	414	Kurt Warner (St. Louis)
Most attempts, without interception, game	45	Kurt Warner (St. Louis)
Most rushing yards, game, quarterback	64	Steve McNair (Tennessee)
Records tied
Most punts, career	17	Mike Horan (St. Louis)

Team records set
Most yards passing (net)	407 yds	Rams
Records tied
Fewest rushing touchdowns	0	Rams
Fewest first downs rushing	1	Rams
Most first downs, passing	18	Rams
Most first downs, penalty	4	Rams
Fewest turnovers, game	0	Rams; Titans
Fewest points, first half	0	Titans
Fewest punt return yards gained, game	–1 yards	Titans
Fewest passing touchdowns	0	Titans

Turnovers are defined as the number of times losing the ball on interceptions and fumbles.

Records tied, both team totals
	Total	Rams	Titans
Most field goals attempted	7	4	3
Fewest rushing attempts	49	13	36
Most passing yards (net)	615	407	208
Most first downs, penalty	6	4	2
Fewest times intercepted	0	0	0
Fewest fumbles lost	0	0	0
Fewest Turnovers	0	0	0

== Starting lineups ==
Hall of Fame‡

St. Louis	Position	Position	Tennessee
Offense
Torry Holt	WR		Kevin Dyson
Orlando Pace‡	LT		Brad Hopkins
Tom Nütten	LG		Bruce Matthews‡
Mike Gruttadauria	C		Kevin Long
Adam Timmerman	RG		Benji Olson
Fred Miller	RT		Jon Runyan
Roland Williams	TE		Frank Wycheck
Isaac Bruce‡	WR		Isaac Byrd
Kurt Warner‡	QB		Steve McNair
Marshall Faulk‡	RB		Eddie George
Robert Holcombe	FB	TE	Jackie Harris
Defense
Kevin Carter	LE		Jevon Kearse
Ray Agnew	LDT		Josh Evans
D'Marco Farr	RDT		Jason Fisk
Grant Wistrom	RE		Kenny Holmes
Mike Jones	LLB		Eddie Robinson
London Fletcher	MLB		Barron Wortham
Todd Collins	RLB		Joe Bowden
Todd Lyght	LCB		Denard Walker
Dexter McCleon	RCB		Samari Rolle
Billy Jenkins	SS		Blaine Bishop
Keith Lyle	FS		Anthony Dorsett

== Officials ==
- Referee: Bob McElwee, #95 (third Super Bowl; previously worked XXII and XXVIII, the latter of which was the first Super Bowl played in Atlanta)
- Umpire: Ron Botchan, #110, fifth Super Bowl (XX, XXXVII, XXIX, XXI)
- Head linesman: Earnie Frantz, #111, third Super Bowl (XXIV, XXXI)
- Line judge: Byron Boston, #18, first Super Bowl
- Field judge: Al Jury, #106, fifth Super Bowl (XX, XXII, XXIV, XXVIII)
- Side judge: Tom Fincken, #47, third Super Bowl (XXIX, XXXVI)
- Back judge: Bill Leavy, #127, first Super Bowl (later officiated Super Bowl XL as referee)
- Alternate referee: Walt Coleman, #65
- Alternate umpire: Bob Wagner, #100

Ron Botchan and Al Jury joined Tom Kelleher, Jack Fette and Bob Beeks as the only men to officiate five Super Bowls. Jury became the second African-American (after Beeks) to do so.
