= Ron Botchan =

American football player, coach, and official (1935–2021)

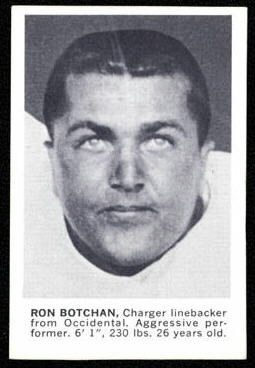

No. 54, 37
- Position: Linebacker

Personal information
- Born: February 15, 1935; Brooklyn, New York, U.S.
- Died: January 28, 2021 (aged 85); California, U.S.
- Listed height: 6 ft 1 in (1.85 m)
- Listed weight: 238 lb (108 kg)

Career information
- High school: Belmont (Los Angeles, California)
- College: Occidental

Career history

Playing
- Los Angeles Chargers (1960); Houston Oilers (1961)

Coaching
- North Hollywood HS (CA) (1965) Head coach; Los Angeles City (1966–1971) Head coach; Valley State (spring 1972) Assistant coach

Awards and highlights
- AFL champion (1961)
- Stats at Pro Football Reference

Ronald Leslie Botchan (February 15, 1935 – January 28, 2021) was an American football player, coach, and official. He played professionally as a linebacker in the American Football League (AFL) from 1960 to 1962. As an official, Botchan worked as an umpire for nearly his entire NFL career and wore the number 110. Regarded as the "NFL's best umpire" by the media, Botchan was assigned to a record-number five Super Bowls: XX in 1986, XXVII in 1993, XXIX in 1995, XXXI in 1997, and XXXIV in 2000. He was also an alternate in Super Bowl XXVI in 1992, and Super Bowl XXXVI in 2002. He ascended to the NFL ranks after nine years of officiating high school and college games.

== Early life and college ==
Botchan played linebacker at Belmont High School and later at Occidental College in Los Angeles, California. At Occidental, Botchan was a teammate to Jack Kemp and Jim Mora; and was a collegiate All-Conference baseball player and an All-Conference and Little All-American linebacker.

== Professional career ==
=== NFL playing career ===
Botchan was drafted by the Baltimore Colts in 1957, but went to play football in the United States Marine Corps. He was selected to the All-Marine and All-Service teams playing linebacker for the Marine Corps Base Quantico and Camp Lejune teams. In 1960, Botchan was approached by scouts of the new upstart American Football League (AFL) and signed a contract for $6,000 to play for the Los Angeles Chargers under head coach Sid Gillman as a starting linebacker. Botchan signed with the Houston Oilers the next year only to have his football playing career ended due to a knee injury. He played in the first two American Football League Championship Games, losing the first with the Chargers vs. the Oilers, and winning the second when the Oilers again defeated the Chargers in the 1961 AFL Championship.

=== Coaching career ===
In 1965, Botchan was hired as the head football coach at North Hollywood High School in Los Angeles, succeeding Doug Gerhart. The following year, he took on the same role at Los Angeles City College. In early 1972, Botchan assisted Rod Humenuik with spring practice at San Fernando Valley State College—now known as California State University, Northridge.

=== Officiating career ===
Botchan's officiating career began in 1972 and until 1976 he officiated high school and junior college football games. He was assigned two games as an umpire in the Pacific-10 Conference between 1976 and 1979 before applying and being accepted to the NFL in 1980.

In 1980, Botchan joined the NFL as a line judge because no openings were available as an umpire. As a rookie, he received a rare opportunity to officiate a playoff game. Historically, rookie officials in the NFL do not participate in the playoffs. An opportunity opened up for Botchan the following year at the umpire position, which he accepted, and stayed for the remainder of his career in the league.

Botchan was the umpire during a 1988 NFL season game on December 31 between the Philadelphia Eagles and Chicago Bears at Soldier Field played under heavy fog. This game became known in NFL lore as the "Fog Bowl". During a game in the late 1990s, Botchan was knocked to the ground and suffered a cut to his head. He continued without missing a single play of the game, but later required eight stitches. He worked Super Bowl XXXIV, in which the Tennessee Titans came up one yard short from tying the score against the St. Louis Rams on the game's final play. The play become known as "The Tackle".

Botchan's last game was an NFC Championship Game between the Philadelphia Eagles and St. Louis Rams on January 27, 2002, and his final appearance was at Super Bowl XXXVI, on February 3, 2002, as an alternate official. He also served as an assistant supervisor of officials for the NFL. Botchan's record of officiating five Super Bowls is shared with Tom Kelleher, Jack Fette, and Al Jury. Botchan once proposed a helmet designed to look like an officials' hat worn by the umpire to protect against head injuries.

== Honors ==
In 1997, Botchan was inducted into the Southern California Jewish Sports Hall of Fame.

== Head coaching record ==
=== Junior college ===
Year	Team	Overall	Conference	Standing	Bowl/playoffs
Los Angeles City Cubs (Western State Conference) (1966–1968)
1966	Los Angeles City	6–2–1	4–2–1	3rd	
1967	Los Angeles City	1–9	1–6	T–7th	
1968	Los Angeles City	6–3	5–2	3rd	
Los Angeles City Cubs (Southern California Conference) (1969–1971)
1969	Los Angeles City	6–3	3–2	T–2nd	
1970	Los Angeles City	7–2	4–1	2nd	
1971	Los Angeles City	6–3	4–1	T–1st	
Los Angeles City:		32–22–1	21–12–1		
Total:		32–22–1			
National championship Conference title Conference division title or championship game berth

== See also ==
- List of American Football League players
- List of Super Bowl officials
