= Fritz Graf =

American football official (1922–2017)

Frederick "Fritz" Graf (December 28, 1922 – November 29, 2017) was a National Football League (NFL) official. He officiated for twenty three years including four Super Bowls (V, VIII, XV & XVIII). He was involved in playoff games in 21 out of 23 years as an official. The most memorable game that he officiated was the "Ice Bowl" in 1967, which was the championship game between the Green Bay Packers and the Dallas Cowboys to determine who was going to the Super Bowl. The weather was so cold (−11 °F (−24 °C)) that Fritz's whistle froze to his lips. The whistle can now be found in the Pro Football Hall of Fame in Canton, OH. He wore the uniform number 34 (except from 1979 to 1981, when officials were numbered by position, he wore number 7), later worn by referees Gerald Austin and Clete Blakeman.

== Early life ==
Graf was born and grew up in Akron, Ohio, graduating from St. Vincent High School in 1940. He then graduated from Midshipmen School NW University in Chicago, IL as an officer in the Navy. He eventually ended up in Hawaii where he was the officer in charge of recreation in Waikiki Beach, HI. He married his high school sweetheart, Rita, August 10, 1946, at Sacred Heart Church in Honolulu, Hawaii. Together they had ten children.

== Career ==
Graf started officiating high school games in 1945 and eventually worked his way to college and then the NFL in 1960.

Graf was the field judge for the first regular season game between the Cleveland Browns and Cincinnati Bengals on October 11, 1970, at Municipal Stadium. The Browns overcame an early 10–0 deficit and won 30–27.

Graf retired from officiating after Super Bowl XVIII in 1984, but continued to work with the NFL as an instant replay official for many years. Fritz states that the perfect ending to his career was when he ran out onto the field for Super Bowl XVIII and saw his wife and his children cheering him on, joined by others.

Graf's number 34 was taken by Gerald Austin following his retirement. Clete Blakeman, the referee for Super Bowl 50, currently wears it.

Many notable officials worked with Graf including Ben Dreith, Tom Kelleher, Tommy Bell, and Jerry Markbreit.

Graf died on November 29, 2017, surrounded by family. He was the oldest living NFL official.
