= Brian Bolinger =

American football official

- Education: Indiana State University
- Occupations: NCAA Division III official (2001–2004); NCAA Division II official (2005); Mid-American Conference official (2006–2012); Big Ten Conference official (2013–2016); NFL official (2017–present)
- Spouse: Christina
- Children: Jocelyn, Arianna, Gabriella Bolinger

Brian Bolinger is an American football official in the National Football League (NFL) who serves as a line judge and down judge. He has been with the NFL since 2017, and previously was a high school and college official.

Bolinger started as a high school official in the 1990s. He was an NCAA Division III official from 2001 to 2004, an NCAA Division II official in 2005, a Mid-American Conference official from 2006 to 2012, and a Big Ten Conference official from 2013 until being hired by the NFL in 2017. In 2020, he officiated his first playoff game, between the Baltimore Ravens and Tennessee Titans.

== See also ==
- List of National Football League officials
