= Tony Steratore =

American football official

- Occupation: NFL official (2000–2021)

Tony Steratore is a former American football official in the National Football League (NFL) who wore uniform number 112. He had worked as a back judge from the 2000 NFL season until his retirement in the 2021 offseason. For the 2020 NFL season, Steratore was scheduled to be the back judge on the officiating crew headed by referee Jerome Boger, but chose to opt due to the COVID-19 pandemic. He is a native of the Pittsburgh suburb of Washington, Pennsylvania. Former NFL referee Gene Steratore Jr. is his younger brother. His father, Gene Steratore Sr., was an official in both college football and basketball. He officiated two Super Bowl games, which were Super Bowl XXXIX in Jacksonville, Florida, and Super Bowl XLVI in Indianapolis.

Outside of his NFL officiating duties, Tony Steratore is the president of Steratore Sanitary Supplies in Washington, Pennsylvania; his younger brother Gene is vice-president.
