= Paul King (American football official) =

American football official

- Occupation: NFL official (2009–present)

Paul King is an American football official in the National Football League (NFL) since the 2009 NFL season, wearing uniform number 121. He is the umpire on Land Clark's officiating crew for the 2020 NFL season. Outside of his NFL duties, he is a retired middle school mathematics teacher at Worcester east middle school in Worcester Massachusetts.
