= Bill Leavy =

American football official (1947–2023)

- Born: February 13, 1947; Santa Barbara, California, U.S.
- Died: March 28, 2023 (aged 76)
- Occupation: NFL official (1995–2014)

Bill Leavy (pronounced LEE-vee; February 13, 1947 – March 28, 2023) was an American football official who officiated in the National Football League (NFL) from the 1995 through the 2014 seasons, wore uniform number 127, and was also a retired San Jose, California police officer and firefighter, serving for 27 years. In his twenty-year NFL officiating career, Leavy was assigned to fifteen playoff games, including two Super Bowls. He was selected as a back judge on the Super Bowl XXXIV officiating crew in 2000 and headed up the Super Bowl XL officiating crew as referee in 2006.

== Personal life ==
=== Early years ===
Leavy was a 1965 graduate of Santa Barbara High School in Santa Barbara, California, and a 1970 graduate of San Jose State University in San Jose, California where he earned a degree in law enforcement. Just before earning his degree, he joined the San Jose Police Department in September 1969. During his high school and college years, Leavy's athletic interests included swimming and football.

As a member of the San Jose Police Athletic League (PAL), he was introduced to football officiating by a fellow PAL officer, who was a high school football official. Between the 1970s and 1984, Leavy worked several all-star, playoff, championship games at the high school and junior college levels.

=== Later life and death ===
Bill lived in San Jose, California. He died on March 28, 2023, at the age of 76.

== Officiating career ==
=== Early years ===
Leavy joined the Big West Conference, a Division I college conference, in 1984. During his 11 seasons in Division I football, he worked four college bowl games (Independence, Freedom, California and Las Vegas).

=== NFL career ===
In December 1994, Leavy received a call from then NFL Supervisor of Officials, Jerry Seeman, that he was selected as one of 12 finalists for open positions beginning with the 1995 NFL season. On March 27, 1995, Leavy was hired by the league as a field judge. Leavy's first game was a pre-season matchup between the Dallas Cowboys and Buffalo Bills at Texas Stadium. For seven seasons, Leavy worked as a field judge and later as a back judge, when the league swapped position names in 1998, before being promoted to referee for the 2001 NFL season. This opportunity at the referee position became available as a result of Phil Luckett returning to his original back judge position due to the time commitment that is involved to be a successful crew chief.

Outside of the NFL, Leavy was hired in 1998 as the Coordinator of Football Officials for the Western Athletic Conference and was appointed Coordinator of Football Officials for the Mountain West Conference in 1999.

Leavy was inadvertently struck in the back of the head by a player while trying to break up a fight during a National Football Conference (NFC) Wild Card playoff game on January 8, 2000, between the Detroit Lions and Washington Redskins at FedExField in Landover, Maryland. He was not forced to leave the game.

In the game that followed the September 11, 2001 attacks, Leavy was assigned to work a game at Candlestick Park in San Francisco between the San Francisco 49ers and St. Louis Rams. Paying tribute to the New York City police and firefighters who served during and in the aftermath of the attacks, Leavy wore a San Francisco Fire Department (SFFD) hat during the coin toss. Just prior to the coin toss, Leavy announced that it was "my special privilege to be [here] [today] after serving 27 years as a police officer and firefighter in San Jose."

Leavy was downgraded in 2013 after a Green Bay Packers vs. San Francisco 49ers game after he made an officiating mistake that allowed the 49ers an additional chance at a third-down conversion inside the Packers' 10-yard line. The 49ers went on to score a touchdown on the next play, en route to a 34–28 win.

Leavy's 2014 NFL officiating crew consisted of umpire Chad Brown, head linesman Ed Camp, line judge Mark Perlman, field judge Jimmy Buchanan, side judge Scott Novak, and back judge Keith Ferguson.

=== Super Bowl XL ===
Leavy's crew refereed Super Bowl XL between the Seattle Seahawks and Pittsburgh Steelers. His performance was criticized by Seahawks coach Mike Holmgren. In response the NFL released a statement defending the officials' performance. NFL spokesman Greg Aiello said in a statement that "the game was properly officiated". Mike Pereira, Supervisor of Officials stated that the calls were correct, with the exception of the penalty called against Seattle quarterback Matt Hasselbeck for an illegal low block in the fourth quarter. In 2010, while visiting the Seahawks' preseason training camp for an annual rules interpretation session with the Seattle media, Leavy brought up Super Bowl XL.

It was a tough thing for me. I kicked two calls in the fourth quarter and I impacted the game, and as an official you never want to do that. It left me with a lot of sleepless nights, and I think about it constantly. I'll go to my grave wishing that I'd been better.... I know that I did my best at that time, but it wasn't good enough.... When we make mistakes, you got to step up and own them. It's something that all officials have to deal with, but unfortunately when you have to deal with it in the Super Bowl it's difficult.

=== Retirement ===
Leavy's retirement was announced on May 13, 2015. He was replaced by former line judge John Hussey.
