= Ed Marion =

American football official (1927–2008)

Edward P. Marion (1927 – April 28, 2008) was an American official in the National Football League (NFL). Marion was in the league from 1960 to 1987 and officiated in Super Bowl V, IX and XI. He wore the number 26 for the majority of his career (during the 1979–81 period, he wore number 6).

Marion was born in 1927 in Charlotte, North Carolina and grew up in Harrisburg, Pennsylvania, and was in the U.S. Navy during World War II. He graduated from the University of Pennsylvania in 1950, where he played American football. He worked in the pension and insurance industry for 46 years.

Marion was a key leader of the Professional Football Referees Association (PFRA), forerunner of the National Football League Referees Association (NFLRA), elected as union president to its first board of directors in 1972 and tapped as executive director in 1974. Marion was instrumental in winning the first pensions for retiring officials after a presentation to the annual meeting of NFL owners in 1974.

Marion died on 28 April 2008 in Coatesville, Pennsylvania.
