= Stan Javie =

American football official (1919–2002)

- Born: Stanley Jaworowski; December 7, 1919; Philadelphia, Pennsylvania, U.S.
- Died: December 30, 2002 (aged 83); Philadelphia, Pennsylvania, U.S.
- Occupation: National Football League official

Stanley Javie (December 7, 1919 – December 30, 2002) was an American football official in the National Football League (NFL) for 30 years until the conclusion of the 1980 NFL season. Working as a back judge (field judge since 1998), Javie was assigned four Super Bowls; Super Bowl II, Super Bowl VIII, Super Bowl X, and Super Bowl XIV; one of the first officials to reach such an achievement. Javie was also notable for being one of the few officials to wear eyeglasses/sunglasses on the playing field during a game. Javie wore the number 29 for the majority of his career. For the 1979 and 1980 NFL seasons, Javie wore the number 6.

He graduated from St. John's High School, Philadelphia and later coached three sports at that school for several years. Javie played football at Georgetown University and was drafted by the Philadelphia Eagles in the 30th round of the 1943 NFL draft.

In addition, Javie was a basketball coach at Malvern Preparatory School, while serving as a football and basketball official. Stan Javie was inducted the National Polish-American Sports Hall of Fame on June 23, 2011, in Troy, Michigan.

Stan's cousin, Johnny Stevens, was an American League baseball umpire from 1948 to 1971.

== Personal life ==
Stan's son, Steve, was a long-time official in the National Basketball Association. Steve wore the same number as his father, 29. Steve contributed to NBA Finals coverage on ABC-TV in 2013. Steve Javie was inducted the National Polish-American Sports Hall of Fame in 2017 in Troy, Michigan
