= Gene Steratore =

American football and college basketball official (born 1963)

- Born: Eugene Joseph Steratore; February 8, 1963 (age 63); Uniontown, Pennsylvania, U.S.
- Education: Kent State University
- Occupations: Rules analyst for CBS Sports and CBS/TNT NCAA March Madness; NFL official (2003–2018); NCAA basketball official (1995–2018)

Eugene Joseph Steratore (/ˈstɛrəˌtɔːr/; born February 8, 1963) is a former American football official in the National Football League (NFL) from 2003 until his retirement from the NFL in June 2018. He also worked as a National Collegiate Athletic Association (NCAA) Division I men's basketball referee from 1997 to 2018. Since the fall of 2018, Steratore has served as a rules analyst for CBS Sports, including the NFL, College Football, College Basketball, and March Madness.

Steratore entered the league as a field judge and was promoted to referee at the start of the 2006 season, one of two new referees (Jerome Boger being the other) for that season, following the retirements of Bernie Kukar and Tom White. He wore uniform number 114. Steratore was chosen to be the alternate referee of Super Bowl XLIV, which was held in Miami on February 7, 2010, and was chosen to be the referee for Super Bowl LII, played on February 4, 2018, which would be his last game officiating.

Steratore was one of two active NFL referees (Bill Vinovich being the other) who also officiated NCAA Division I men's basketball games.

== Career ==
=== National Football League ===
Steratore took over briefly as referee during a regular-season game on December 28, 2003, between the Carolina Panthers and New York Giants after Bernie Kukar, the crew chief, was injured during a play in which he was hit in the back by the Giants' Clarence LeBlanc after a blocked punt.

Steratore worked his first NFL playoff game as a referee between the Arizona Cardinals and the Carolina Panthers on January 10, 2009, at Bank of America Stadium in Charlotte, North Carolina. Exactly one year later, he refereed the Baltimore Ravens' 33–14 victory over the New England Patriots in an American Football Conference (AFC) Wild Card game at Gillette Stadium in Foxborough, Massachusetts.

Steratore was involved in a controversial instant replay call during week 1 of the 2010 NFL season between the Detroit Lions and the Chicago Bears at Soldier Field in Chicago. Late in the fourth quarter, Lions receiver Calvin Johnson caught what was originally ruled as the winning touchdown for Detroit. After Steratore conferred with the officials he overturned the call to an incomplete pass, ruling that Johnson lost control of the ball while going to the ground before he "completed the process of completing the catch". Steratore was supported by the NFL and backed by its former vice president of officiating, Mike Pereira. The rule has since been referred to as the "Calvin Johnson rule".

Steratore was selected as the first referee to officiate a game following the 2012 NFL referee lockout on September 27, 2012, a Thursday-night contest between the Cleveland Browns and the Baltimore Ravens. The Baltimore crowd cheered Steratore and his crew as they entered the field.

Steratore was named as referee for the NFC Championship game on January 19, 2014, between the Seattle Seahawks and San Francisco 49ers.

Steratore was the referee during the NFC divisional playoff game between the Dallas Cowboys and the Green Bay Packers on January 11, 2015, when a fourth-quarter, fourth-down catch by Cowboys wide receiver Dez Bryant was overturned using the "Calvin Johnson rule". The Packers challenged the call and after review, it was determined that the ball touched the ground before Bryant completed the catch.

In a game on December 17, 2017, between the Dallas Cowboys and Oakland Raiders, Steratore took the controversial step of employing an index card normally used for recording penalties to assist him in determining whether the Cowboys had made the line to gain for a first down. His ruling that they had done so allowed Dallas to kick a late field goal in their 20–17 victory.

Steratore was the referee for Super Bowl LII.

=== Retirement from NFL ===
Steratore's retirement as an NFL referee was announced by the circuit's Senior Vice President of Officiating Alberto Riveron on June 22, 2018. He was the fourth referee to retire during the 2018 offseason along with Ed Hochuli, Jeff Triplette and Terry McAulay.

=== CBS Sports and Turner Sports ===
Following retirement, he joined CBS Sports as a rules analyst. CBS had not had a rules analyst on its staff since firing Mike Carey following the 2015 season. In addition to providing analysis for NFL officiating, Steratore also contributes in a similar role for the network's college football coverage, college basketball coverage and NCAA March Madness on CBS/TBS/TNT/truTV. Steratore is unusual in that most other networks have not used a rules analyst for basketball or college football.

== Personal life ==
Steratore lives in his native Washington, Pennsylvania, a suburb of Pittsburgh. Gene has an older brother, Tony, who was also an NFL official until the 2021 offseason, when he retired. His father, Gene Steratore Sr., was a college football official and basketball referee.

Steratore and his brother are the co-owners of Steratore Sanitary Supply in Washington, Pennsylvania, outside of their NFL officiating duties.
