= Art Demmas =

American football official (1934–2016)

- Born: July 7, 1934; St. Louis, Missouri, U.S.
- Died: August 6, 2016 (aged 82); Nashville, Tennessee, U.S.
- Education: Vanderbilt University
- Occupation: American football official

Arthur George Demmas (July 7, 1934 – August 6, 2016) was an American football official for 28 seasons. He worked in the American Football League (AFL) in 1968 and 1969, and in the National Football League (NFL) from 1970 to 1996. During his career, Demmas was assigned to four Super Bowls (XIII, XVII, XXV, and XXVIII), all as an umpire. On the field, Demmas wore uniform number 78, which is now worn by Greg Meyer. He served as a league representative and observer for the NFL and worked as a trainer for NFL officials. In 1997, he was inducted into the Tennessee Sports Hall of Fame. Demmas was an executive in the National Football Foundation (NFF), and became head of its Middle Tennessee chapter. The organization determines who will be in the College Football Hall of Fame.

== Biography ==
Demmas worked much of his career as the umpire on the crew of a fellow AFL official, referee Ben Dreith.

During the fourth quarter of Super Bowl XIII, Dallas Cowboys safety Charlie Waters collided with Demmas as he was moving into position to tackle Pittsburgh Steelers running back Franco Harris. Harris scored a touchdown on the play, giving the Steelers a 28–17 lead, and Pittsburgh went on to win the game, 35–31.

A native of Nashville, Tennessee, Demmas played football at and graduated from Vanderbilt University, learning the game from College Football Hall of Fame coach Jess Neely. Following graduation from Vanderbilt, Demmas enrolled in the Reserve Officers' Training Corps program. Commissioned as a second lieutenant, he was assigned to the U.S. Army Intelligence detail. He opted for an eight-year term, which consisted of six months active duty and seven-and-a-half years active reserve.

Demmas served as an executive in the National Football Foundation (NFF), the organization that determines who will be in the College Football Hall of Fame. He became head of its Middle Tennessee chapter. He worked as a trainer for NFL officials. In 1997, he was inducted into the Tennessee Sports Hall of Fame.

Demmas died in August 2016 at the age of 82.

== See also ==
- List of American Football League officials
- List of Vanderbilt University people
