= Bruce Alford Sr. =

American football player and official (1922–2010)

Bruce Alford
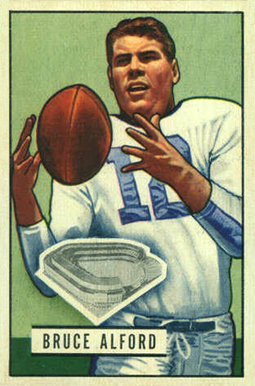
- Alford on a 1951 Bowman football card

No. 51, 54, 12
- Positions: End, defensive back

Personal information
- Born: September 12, 1921; Speegleville, Texas, U.S.
- Died: May 8, 2010 (aged 88); Fort Worth, Texas, U.S.
- Listed height: 6 ft 0 in (1.83 m)
- Listed weight: 190 lb (86 kg)

Career information
- High school: Waco (Waco, Texas)
- College: TCU (1939–1942)
- NFL draft: 1943: 8th round, 62nd overall pick

Career history

Playing
- New York Yankees (1946–1949); New York Yanks (1950–1951); Dallas Texans (1952)*
- * Offseason or practice squad member only

Coaching
- Dallas Texans (1952) Assistant coach

Awards and highlights
- First-team All-Pro (1947); Third-team All-American (1942); First-team All-SWC (1942); Second-team All-SWC (1941)

Career NFL/AAFC statistics
- Receptions: 81
- Receiving yards: 1,341
- Receiving touchdowns: 9
- Stats at Pro Football Reference

Herbert Bruce Alford Sr. (September 12, 1922 – May 8, 2010) was an American football end in the National Football League (NFL) for the New York Yanks. He also played football in the All-America Football Conference (AAFC) for the New York Yankees. Alford played college football at Texas Christian University (TCU). Alford was an all Southwest Conference end in 1941 and 1942 was named MVP in the 1942 Orange Bowl and received Rogers Trophy in 1942, awarded to the TCU Most Valuable Player. He served in World War II for the United States Army.

After retiring from playing, he was a line judge in the NFL for 20 seasons, from 1960 to 1979, working three Super Bowls (II, VII, IX), wearing number 24. His son, Bruce Alford Jr., also played in the NFL. he died on May 8, 2010, at age 87.
