= Dana McKenzie =

American football official

- Occupation: NFL official (2008–present)

Dana McKenzie is an American football official in the National Football League (NFL) since the 2008 NFL season. He wears uniform number 8.

As an official in the NFL, McKenzie is known for working Super Bowl XLIX in 2015 as a head linesman on the crew of Bill Vinovich. He is currently the down judge on Tony Corrente's officiating crew for the 2019 NFL season.

== Personal ==
McKenzie grew up in Wellington, Ohio, and currently works as an insurance claims adjuster in Zionsville, IN with 3 children (Everly, Sterling, and Whitaker)

Dana's father, Dick McKenzie, was a line judge in the NFL and officiated in Super Bowl XXV and Super Bowl XXVII.

== Officiating career ==
=== NFL career ===
McKenzie was hired by the NFL in 2008 as a head linesman, and was placed on the officiating crew of former referee Mike Carey, where he remained for four years. For the 2012 NFL season, McKenzie was reassigned to the crew of Pete Morelli, where he remained until the 2015 NFL season.

McKenzie has officiated five playoff games, which include two Wild Cards, one Divisional, the 2013 NFC Championship Game, and Super Bowl XLIX. McKenzie worked as down judge in Super Bowl LX.

=== DeAngelo Hall incident ===
On October 28, 2012, McKenzie was assigned as the head linesman on the Week 8 game between the Washington Redskins and Pittsburgh Steelers at Heinz Field. With 3:48 remaining in the fourth quarter, Washington cornerback DeAngelo Hall was taken to the ground by Pittsburgh wide receiver Emmanuel Sanders during the play. Following the play, Hall rose from the ground, removed his helmet (a violation of NFL rules), and approached McKenzie, who was walking into the field of play from the sideline. Hall argued for a foul to be called while using expletives, making McKenzie retreat and ultimately throw his flag, along with side judge Don Carlsen. When McKenzie walked away from Hall to report the foul to referee Pete Morelli, Hall confronted both him and Morelli with more expletives, before being escorted away by Carlsen, line judge John Hussey, and other Washington teammates. Hall was assessed two fouls, ejected from the game, and was later fined $30,000. In the days following the incident, McKenzie claimed that Hall gave him death threats, which prompted the foul and ejection. Hall denied the threats were issued, and claimed McKenzie was equally at fault for the incident. McKenzie was not disciplined for his involvement in the play. In January 2013, McKenzie, who was originally assigned to officiate the Redskins Wild Card playoff game against the Seattle Seahawks, was reassigned to the Wild Card game between the Indianapolis Colts and Baltimore Ravens, to avoid a potential conflict with Hall. McKenzie's assignment was replaced by head linesman Derick Bowers.
