= Carl Paganelli =

American football official (born 1960)

- Born: April 14, 1960 (age 65); Grand Rapids, Michigan, U.S.
- Occupation: NFL official (1999–present)

Carl Paganelli Jr. (born April 14, 1960) is an American football official in the National Football League (NFL) since the 1999 NFL season, who wears uniform number 124. As an umpire, Paganelli is notable for working two Super Bowls, Super Bowl XXXIX and Super Bowl XLI, in a span of three years. He officiated his third Super Bowl game, Super Bowl XLVI, in Indianapolis, and was chosen to officiate Super Bowl XLVIII in East Rutherford, New Jersey. He has two brothers who officiate in the NFL, Dino Paganelli and Perry Paganelli; they are both back judges. Carl Paganelli and Perry Paganelli became the first set of brothers to be part of the same officiating crew when they officiated Super Bowl XLI together.

He is the only official to work four Super Bowls since 2000. From 1966 to 1999, five officials worked five Super Bowls and seven worked four.

For the 2021 NFL season, Paganelli is serving on the officiating crew headed by NFL referee Brad Rogers.

His father Carl Paganelli Sr. is a member of the Arena Football Hall of Fame.

On December 1, 2024, during a contest between the Tampa Bay Buccaneers and the Carolina Panthers in Charlotte, Paganelli suffered an injury and was carted off the field in the first half. He was on the officiating crew of Tra Blake that day.
