= Laird Hayes =

American football official (born 1949)

- Born: October 3, 1949 (age 75); Newport Beach, California, U.S.
- Occupation: NFL official (1995–2017)

Dr. Laird Hayes (born October 3, 1949) is a former American football official in the National Football League (NFL). He was in the NFL for 23 years between 1995 and 2017. He wore uniform number 125. For the 2017 NFL season, Hayes was the side judge on the officiating crew headed by referee Walt Anderson. Hayes retired following the 2017 season.

Hayes graduated from San Marcos High School in Santa Barbara, California. Hayes earned his bachelor's degree from Princeton University in New Jersey in 1971. He was awarded a Master's and Doctorate in Higher Education from the University of California at Los Angeles in 1976.

He played on football, basketball and baseball teams in high school, which prepared him for an athletic performance at Princeton. He played on the freshman football team and four years as a catcher for the Princeton Tigers baseball team.

Hayes' officiating career started with basketball, baseball, and football games in high school and community colleges. In 1983, he was elevated to the Pac-10 as a football official. This was followed with a 1995 appointment to the National Football League roster of officials and his designation as a side judge. During his career in the NFL, he has officiated in three Super Bowls: XXXVI in 2002, XXXVIII in 2004, and XLVI in 2012 (where he made a call which might be consider one of the greatest calls in Super Bowl history). He also officiated at the 2006 Pro Bowl.

Hayes has held the post of Men's Soccer Coach and Professor of Education and Athletics at Orange Coast College in Costa Mesa, California, since 1976 and retired in November 2010. He also taught First Aid/CPR, surfing, bowling, soccer, and weight training.

Hayes is President of the Quarterback and Receiver Camp (QBR) in its 50th year of non-contact, football fundamentals training for youth players, grades 6 through 12. QBR schedules six summer camps held in California, New Jersey, Arkansas, Ohio and Georgia.
