= Mark Hittner =

American football official

- Occupation: NFL official (1997–present)

Mark Hittner is an American football official in the National Football League (NFL) since the beginning of the 1997 NFL season. He works as a head linesman and wears the uniform number 28. He is most notable for officiating in three Super Bowls, most recently in Super Bowl XL on February 5, 2006, between the Seattle Seahawks and Pittsburgh Steelers.

Hittner played college football at Pittsburg State University in Pittsburg, Kansas from 1976 to 1979 where he was an all-conference quarterback in 1978-79 and is the school's second-leading career passer in yards (4,830).

Hittner was a college football official in the Big Eight/Big 12 Conference for 13 years prior to joining the NFL in 1997. He worked the first Big 12 championship game at the Trans World Dome in St. Louis in 1996, won by the Texas Longhorns over the Nebraska Cornhuskers, 37–27.

In the NFL, Hittner has officiated eight post-season assignments including Super Bowls XXXVI, XXXVIII, and XL, in addition to two wild-card, one divisional, and two conference championship games.

For the 2017 NFL season, Hittner was the down judge on the officiating crew headed by referee Craig Wrolstad. He worked with referee Ed Hochuli from the 2000 NFL season to the 2013 NFL season.

Outside of his NFL officiating duties, Hittner owns a financial services company in the Kansas City Metropolitan Area. He is married and has three sons.

== Super Bowl XL ==
Hittner was the head linesman on the Super Bowl XL officiating crew headed by referee Bill Leavy. Hittner made a touchdown call in the second quarter with two minutes remaining in the first half. On third down from the Seattle one-yard line, Pittsburgh quarterback Ben Roethlisberger took the snap, faked a handoff, and dove toward the left side of a pile along the goal-line before being hit by Seahawks linebacker D. D. Lewis. After first raising one hand (as if to indicate that the quarterback was down), Hittner raised a second arm to signal a touchdown. The play stood after instant replay review. Hittner later said that it "was probably the closest goal-line call" he'd ever had. He says he "thought 'touchdown' in my head, and then I went up with one arm, which means the play is over, but I should have gone with two arms."
