= Byron Boston =

American football official

- Occupation: NFL official (1995–2020)

Byron Boston is a former American football official in the National Football League (NFL), from 1995 until 2020. He was a line judge and wore the uniform number 18. During his NFL officiating career, Boston was assigned to Super Bowl XXXIV, Super Bowl XLVII, and Super Bowl LII. and ten conference championship games.

== Early life ==
Boston played football for Austin College in Sherman, Texas, and graduated with a bachelor's degree in Economics.

== Career ==
He began his officiating career in 1977 in Dallas, Texas, where he worked Texas high school football from 1977 to 1984, which included two State Championship games. After working high school games, Boston moved up to Junior College football in 1985 and later joined the Southland Conference in 1987. In 1990, Boston began working games in the Southwest Conference. Over his college football officiating career, Boston was selected for Division 1AA playoff games and ended his final game at the collegiate level with the 1994 Holiday Bowl. In 1995, Boston was selected to the NFL officiating staff.

On February 15, 2007, the Southland Conference named Byron Boston as coordinator of football officials.

In 2020, after nearly 25 years of officiating, Boston retired from being an NFL official and his jersey is on display in the Pro Football Hall of Fame.

== Personal life ==
Boston and his wife Carolyn reside in Humble, Texas, and have three children, Alicia, Byron Jr., and David. David was an American football wide receiver in the NFL. Byron Boston works as a tax consultant outside of his NFL officiating duties.
