= Tom Sifferman =

American football official (born 1943)

- Born: September 27, 1943 (age 81); Seattle, Washington, U.S.

Tom Sifferman (born September 27, 1943) is an American football official in the National Football League (NFL) from the 1986 NFL season to the 2008 NFL season. Sifferman is notable for being the only official in NFL history assigned to three consecutive Super Bowls, which include Super Bowl XXXVII in 2003, Super Bowl XXXVIII in 2004, and Super Bowl XXXIX in 2005. He served as a field judge and wore uniform number 118. Sifferman is now a Replay Official, a duty he performed at Super Bowl LI.

== Career ==
Sifferman is a native of Seattle, Washington and is a 1961 graduate of Seattle Preparatory School. He is a retired manufacturer representative for a steel and aluminum products company. Sifferman resides in Bend, Oregon.

Sifferman was the field judge during a 1988 NFL season game on December 31 between the Philadelphia Eagles and Chicago Bears at Soldier Field played under heavy fog. This game would become known in NFL lore as the "Fog Bowl".

During the 2006 NFL season, Sifferman was a field judge on the officiating crew headed by referee Ed Hochuli.

Sifferman goes by the nickname "Jungle Boy" as replay official, a nickname discovered when Hochuli accidentally turned on his microphone to the crowd during a game. He received the nickname for touring a jungle on a trip to Hawaii.
