= Chad Brown (American football official) =

American football player and official (1947–2016)

- Born: September 9, 1947; Dallas, Texas, U.S.
- Died: September 9, 2016 (aged 69); Carson, California, U.S.
- Education: Texas A&M University–Commerce
- Occupation: NFL official (1992–2014)
- Spouse: Deborah
- Children: 2

Chadwick Curtis Brown Jr. (September 9, 1947 – September 9, 2016) was a National Football League (NFL) official who officiated from 1992 through 2014. Brown served as an umpire and officiated in two Super Bowls (2001 and 2011) and served as an alternate (standby) official for Super Bowl XXXIII in 1999. He wore uniform number 31.

== Career ==
Prior to his career as an NFL game official, Brown officiated football in the Big West Athletic Conference. He played college football at East Texas State, now Texas A&M University–Commerce. As a sophomore offensive and defensive tackle in 1966, A&M Commerce won its very first Lone Star Conference football championship. Brown was a NAIA All-American, an All-Lone Star Conference offensive lineman in 1967 and '68 and a Kodak All-American in 1968, becoming the first African-American to reach All-American status for the college. His athletic accomplishments earned him a 1993 induction into the East Texas State (ETSU) Athletic Hall of Fame. Brown then was on the preseason rosters in the NFL for the Pittsburgh Steelers, the Houston Oilers, and the New Orleans Saints.

Outside of the NFL, Brown was employed at the University of California, Los Angeles, campus since 1988, and celebrated his retirement in 2011. At UCLA, he served in several sports management capacities in the Department of Cultural and Recreational Affairs and as an executive officer to the vice chancellor of student affairs.

In December 2012, Brown was inducted into the Texas Black Sports Hall of Fame, joining other NFL inductees, Tim Brown, Charles Haley and Gene Upshaw (posthumous). Brown, along with eleven other inductees in various sports, was recognized for exemplary performance in sportmanship, citizenship, and contributions to the history of sports as a Texas-born, African-American athlete.

== Retirement and death ==
He retired midway through the 2014 season, after being absent with an undisclosed illness. Chad Brown died after a lengthy illness on September 9, 2016, his 69th birthday.

Umpire Barry Anderson switched his uniform number to 31 after Brown's death. Officials wore a memorial patch with the number 31 on their caps.

== Books ==
- Inside the Meat Grinder: An NFL Official's Life in the Trenches
