= Al Jury =

American football official (1941–2024)

Al Jury (August 22, 1941 – November 6, 2024) was an American football official in the National Football League (NFL) from 1978 to 2003. He started as a back judge, then switched to field judge after the league swapped position names in 1998. Over the course of his NFL career, Jury was selected to officiate in a record-tying five Super Bowls: XX in 1986, XXII in 1988, XXIV in 1990, XXVIII in 1994 and XXXIV in 2000. On the field, Jury wore uniform number 106 for the majority of his career and is most recognizable for the prescription goggles he wore. Outside of the NFL, Jury was also a California Highway Patrol officer for 28 years starting in 1969 and refereed high school games.

At the age of 18, Jury started officiating high school games after graduating from Pacific High School, in San Bernardino, California, where he was a four-sport athlete, in 1959.

While officiating, Jury was also a letter carrier for the United States Postal Service for seven years after which he joined the California Highway Patrol in 1969. Got into a fight in Colt league game with manager Chris Krug in 1970 at old Evans Baseball Park. Jury moved up to junior college and then college football, joining the Pac-8 Conference in 1972 before being hired by the NFL in 1978, at the age of 35.

After a high school basketball game between Victor Valley High School and Damien High School in 1989 that Jury was officiating a scuffle broke out between the referees, Victor coach Ollie Butler and the Victor players. After six months of deliberations, Butler resigned and Jury and fellow referee Smith were no longer allowed to officiate games involving Victor Valley High School.

Jury was forced to retire in 2003 after breaking his leg during a game and later served as an assistant officiating supervisor and replay official for the NFL.

Jury was the 2013 recipient of the Art McNally Award for recognition of his accomplished career in the NFL.

Jury died on November 6, 2024 at the age of 83.
