= Tommy Bell (American football official) =

American football official (1922–1986)

Tommy Bell (July 2, 1922 – February 20, 1986) was an American football official in the National Football League (NFL) and was regarded as "one of the NFL's most respected referees". When he joined the NFL as an official in 1962 from the Southeastern Conference, he was given the referee position, and stayed at that spot until his retirement in 1976. He officiated Super Bowl III in 1969 and Super Bowl VII in 1973. He is also the only official in history to referee in both a Super Bowl and NCAA Final Four (1959). He retired from the NFL following the 1976 AFC Championship Game between the Oakland Raiders and Pittsburgh Steelers, played December 26, 1976, to conclude a fifteen-year career in the league.

Bell was given a choice of officiating the AFC Championship game or Super Bowl XI as his final NFL game by then-Director of Officiating Art McNally. When Bell chose the former, Jim Tunney was selected as the referee for his second Super Bowl.

His successor as a referee, Jerry Markbreit, was the line judge on Bell's crew in 1976, Markbreit's rookie year in the NFL. The other members of Bell's 1976 crew were umpire Gordon Wells, head linesman (later down judge) Ray Dodez, back judge Tom Kelleher and field judge Ed Merrifield (the back judge and field judge positions were swapped in 1998).

Bell wore uniform number 7 throughout his NFL career. The number was not used during the 1977 and 1978 NFL seasons; fellow referee Fred Silva took the number in 1979 and wore it through his retirement in 1988. Ron Blum, who wore number 83 as a line judge from 1985 through 1992, changed to No. 7 upon his promotion to referee in 1993 and wore it through his retirement in 2007, even though he returned to his original position for his final four NFL seasons. Side judge Keith Washington currently wears No. 7.

Unlike nearly all other professional football officials, Bell did not have to serve an apprenticeship at another position before becoming a referee. He was the last official to be a referee in his rookie season until Brad Allen was hired in 2014.

== Personal ==
In addition to NFL officiating, Bell was an attorney in Lexington, Kentucky, and provided color commentary on Kentucky Wildcats football broadcasts on radio and television following his retirement. He died of chronic leukemia, aged 63, on February 20, 1986. The Rotary Club of Lexington (KY) honors Bell each year by awarding the Tommy Bell Award which recognizes Lexington's Outstanding High School Student Athlete. The Blanton Collier Sportsmanship Group also honors Bell by awarding its Tommy Bell Award to the outstanding football referee in the state. That award is presented annually during the Kentucky Pro Football Hall of Fame induction ceremony each June. Bell was inducted into the Kentucky Pro Football Hall of Fame in 2018.
