= Tom Kelleher (American football) =

American football official (1925–2011)

Thomas Kelleher (August 31, 1925 – March 31, 2011) was an American football official in the National Football League (NFL) for 28 years, from 1960 until the conclusion of the 1987 NFL season. Working as a back judge (the title was changed to field judge in 1998), Kelleher was assigned five Super Bowls; Super Bowl IV, Super Bowl VII, Super Bowl XI, Super Bowl XV and Super Bowl XIX; the first of five officials to reach such an achievement. He wore number 25 for all but two years of his career. For 1979 and 1980, Kelleher wore the number 7 when officials were numbered separately by position. He was born in Philadelphia, and died in Miami.

Kelleher ejected Green Bay Packers Hall of Fame safety Willie Wood from the 1962 NFL Championship Game vs. the New York Giants after Wood bumped him while protesting a call in the third quarter. The Packers overcame Wood's banishment to win 16-7 and successfully defend their championship, Green Bay's second of five in nine seasons under legendary coach Vince Lombardi.

Kelleher's humorous discussion with Coach Hank Stram during Super Bowl IV was caught on film by NFL Films. As Stram was complaining about a missed call, Kelleher pointed out that he was on the field, quickly ending the conversation.Video on YouTube

Kelleher worked 10 consecutive seasons (1977–86) of his career on the crew of Jerry Markbreit (Markbreit was a rookie line judge in 1976 on the crew of referee Tommy Bell, with Kelleher as back judge), who later became the only official to work four Super Bowls (XVII, XXI, XXVI, XXIX) at the referee position. Kelleher's final season, he worked on the crew of Gordon McCarter. Kelleher was a member of Bell's crew from 1965 to 1976.
