= David Plaut =

American filmmaker and author

- Born: David Owen Plaut; September 2, 1953 (age 72); Cincinnati, Ohio, U.S.
- Education: Northwestern University
- Occupations: Film producer, author
- Years active: 1974-2018
- Spouse: Joan Cooper (married 1989–present)
- Children: 2

David Owen Plaut (born September 2, 1953) is an American filmmaker and author. During his 42-year career at NFL Films he was a creator and show runner of television series for ESPN, HBO, Showtime, NBC Sports Network and NFL Network. He was nominated for 12 national Sports Emmy Awards, and was a seven-time winner. Plaut was senior producer for the annual Super Bowl champions video and DVD from 1985 to 2018. He was a writer/producer on over 900 weekly NFL TV series episodes. Outside of NFL Films Plaut authored five books, and was the book critic at USA Today Sports Weekly for fifteen years.

== Early life and education ==
Plaut was born and raised in Cincinnati, Ohio. His father, Arthur Plaut, had a varied career in media with King Records, Ziv Television Programs and local radio station WSAI, along with his own local advertising agency. David's mother Bette (née Ginsburg) also worked in advertising at Dancer Fitzgerald Sample and in public relations before becoming a stay-at-home mom for David and his sister Amy. He was raised in the Jewish religion.

Plaut attended Cincinnati public schools until 1967, when his father accepted a job with KSDO radio in San Diego. After the move, Plaut attended Patrick Henry High School. Immediately following his graduation in 1971, Plaut began a five-year association with the San Diego Chargers football team as a training camp administrative assistant. He returned to southern California at the beginning of summer to rejoin the Chargers after completing each of his undergraduate academic years at Northwestern University. Plaut majored in Radio/TV/Film and earned his bachelor's degree in 1975.

== Broadcasting career ==
After college graduation, Plaut worked with NBC Sports during the 1975 NFL season as an on-site TV crew member for the network's west coast game broadcasts. In January 1976 he was hired by San Diego radio station KGB as an on-air personality. Appearing on a daily broadcast entitled “Studs on Sports,” Plaut wrote and performed comedy sketches lampooning contemporary local and national sports subjects.

== Film and television career ==
In late spring 1976, Plaut was offered a production job by Steve Sabol, president of NFL Films. The two had first met in 1973 when Sabol brought a location crew to the Chargers’ training camp. Plaut accepted the offer and moved east to the company's Philadelphia studios that August.

Plaut's first years with NFL Films were highlighted by a series of comedy shorts he produced for NBC's pregame show Grandstand. Most were parodies or satires about topical NFL stories, which included "End Zone Antics", "Metric Football", "As the Pigskin Turns", "NFL’s Wild Kingdom" and "Dr. Grogan and Mr. Hyde". In 1978 Plaut produced his first long-form comedy, a one-hour special entitled Super Bowl: Laughter and Legend, hosted by Ed McMahon.

Eventually, Plaut would go on to produce six additional full-length football follies films. The most noteworthy was 1987's NFL TV Follies, starring improvisational comic Jonathan Winters. In the film, a fictitious TV channel decides to junk its failing format and switch to all-football programming. It enabled Plaut and co-producer Dave Douglas to create parodies of children's shows, crime dramas, sci-fi fantasies, nature documentaries, household product commercials, local news and highbrow public television programming, among others. NFL TV Follies anticipated the creation of the actual all-football channel, NFL Network, 16 years before its inception. Ironically, many of Plaut's productions during the final decades of his career with NFL Films would be broadcast on NFL Network.

During the 1980 and 1981 seasons, Plaut was producer for Irv Cross’ weekly feature "Focus on Football", which aired on the CBS pregame show, The NFL Today.

In the mid-1980s, NFL Films began producing proprietary programming for the growing home video market. When the 1985 Chicago Bears became a national phenomenon, Plaut was chosen to produce what was referred to in-house as an “instant highlight.” Just five days after Chicago defeated the New England Patriots in Super Bowl XX, Plaut completed a one-hour film on the Bears’ season. Within a few weeks it was in stores and available to Chicago-area fans. Since then, NFL Films has produced a Super Bowl champions video every season. Eventually other sports followed their lead, and now every major North American professional sport annually releases an “instant highlight” film honoring their championship team.

Plaut was also part of the production crew that produced home videos celebrating the greatest moments in Philadelphia and Chicago sports history. Soon after he co-produced a home video for The Sporting News, The Greatest Moments in American Sports History.

In the late 1980s Plaut became the lead producer for all prime-time historical content aired on ESPN, first for Monday Night Magazine, then for the weekly feature Distant Replay. He also began producing 90-minute programs in the NFL's Greatest Games series, starting with his 1997 production of the Cowboys-Packers Ice Bowl. He would go on to produce a dozen shows in the series.

Plaut also created and produced for ESPN an anthology series covering the greatest sporting events and personalities of the 20th century, Sports Almanac, which ran for two seasons. In 1998 he co-produced the Emmy-nominated ESPN special Replay! – The History of the NFL on Television. In 2001, as part of ESPN’S Black History Month programming, Plaut wrote and directed Black Star Risen: The Alan Page Story, the first of two films he would ultimately produce on the life of the Hall of Fame player and Minnesota Supreme Court justice.

With the debut of NFL Network in 2003, Plaut contributed multiple episodes for such series as America’s Game, A Football Life and The Timeline. He was also the creator and co-showrunner for Caught in the Draft, a series devoted to the history of the NFL college draft. On January 15, 2016, his production of Super Bowl I: The Lost Game was the highest-rated non-game program ever to air on NFL Network.

In 2009 he was co-showrunner for Full Color Football: The History of the American Football League, timed to premiere during the 50th anniversary of the AFL. The five-episode series was carried on Showtime. Along with his over-the-air films, Plaut produced eight feature-length team histories for NFL Films’ home video division between 1999 and 2013. Plaut's final production at NFL Films was the Eagles’ Super Bowl LII Champions home video, completed just a week before his retirement.

In 2022 Plaut came out of retirement to produce and direct Give Me Liberty: The Early Years of Patrick Henry High, a one-hour documentary chronicling the experimental San Diego high school he attended from 1968 to 1971. In 2025, the National Academy of Television Arts and Sciences nominated the film for Best Documentary in the Pacific Southwest Chapter Emmy Awards competition.

== Selected filmography ==
=== Television series ===
Title	Year
NFL Game of the Week	1979-1986
NFL Monday Night Magazine	1987-1992
Sports Almanac	1992, 1995
Distant Replay	1993-2006
NFL's Greatest Games	1997-2017
Lost Treasures of NFL Films	1999-2000
America's Game	2005-2008
Full Color Football: The History of the American Football League	2009
The Top 100: NFL's Greatest Players	2010
A Football Life	2011, 2014–2015
Star Spangled Sundays	2013
Caught in the Draft	2014-2015
The Timeline	2015-2017

=== Films ===
Title	Year
Super Bowl: Laughter and Legend	1978
Best Ever Professionals	1981
Second Chance: The Rolf Benirschke Story	1982
Legend of the Lightning Bolt: History of the Chargers	1984
World Champions: 1985 Chicago Bears	1986
Greatest Moments in Philadelphia Sports History	1986
Giants Among Men - Super Bowl XXI Champion New York Giants	1987
NFL TV Follies	1987
Greatest Moments in Chicago Sports History	1987
Warpath - Super Bowl XXII Champion Washington Redskins	1988
NFL Strange But True Body Shapes	1988
Team of the Decade - Super Bowl XXIII Champion San Francisco 49ers	1989
Super Duper Football Follies	1989
Masters of the Game – Super Bowl XXIV Champion San Francisco 49ers	1990
Football Follies on Parade	1990
Greatest Moments in American Sports History	1990
True Blue - Super Bowl XXI Champion New York Giants	1991
Washington Redskins - Super Bowl XXVI Champions	1992
NFL's Greatest Rivalries	1992
Dallas Cowboys - Super Bowl XXVII Champions	1993
LT: The Lawrence Taylor Story	1993
NFL's 100 Greatest Touchdowns	1993
Dallas Cowboys - Super XXVIII Champions	1994
NFL's 100 Greatest Follies	1994
San Francisco 49ers - Super Bowl XXIX Champions	1995
Dallas Cowboys - Super Bowl XXX Champions	1996
NFL's Greatest Ever Running Backs	1996
Green Bay Packers - Super Bowl XXXI Champions	1997
Denver Broncos - Super Bowl XXXII Champions	1998
Replay: The History of the NFL on Television	1998
Blue Diamond: 75 Years of Giants Football	1999
St. Louis Rams - Super Bowl XXXIV Champions	2000
21st Century Football Follies	2000
Joe Montana: A&E Biography	2001
Black Star Risen: The Alan Page Story	2001
Tampa Bay Buccaneers - Super Bowl XXXVI Champions	2003
Dallas Cowboys: The Complete History of America's Team	2003
Cardiac Cats: 2003 NFC Champion Carolina Panthers	2004
Three Games to Glory: The 2004 Patriots	2005
Philadelphia Eagles - 2004 NFC Champions	2005
Pittsburgh Steelers: The Complete History	2005
Seattle Seahawks - 2005 NFC Champions	2006
Indianapolis Colts - Super Bowl XLI Champions	2007
New York Giants - Super Bowl XLII Champions	2008
History of the Washington Redskins	2008
Arizona Cardinals - 2008 NFC Champions	2009
History of the San Diego Chargers	2009
New Orleans Saints - Super Bowl XLIV Champions	2010
History of the Miami Dolphins	2010
Lombardi	2010
Green Bay Packers - Super Bowl XLV Champions	2011
Two Minutes to Glory	2011
The Longest Game Ever: 1971 AFC Championship	2011
Behind the Steel Curtain	2012
Don Shula: 347	2012
New York Giants - Super Bowl XLVI Champions	2012
New Orleans Saints Greatest Moments	2013
Seattle Seahawks - Super Bowl XLVIII Champions	2014
Super Bowl I: The Lost Game	2016
Philadelphia Eagles - Super Bowl LII Champions	2018

== Writing career ==
Plaut's first professional assignment came in 1974, when he wrote a piece for Pro!, the NFL's official game program. The story covered the career of player-turned-official Pat Harder. Plaut went on to write several other articles for Pro! (later named Gameday), including a personality profile on Washington quarterback Joe Theismann and a feature focused on NFL teams’ humorous road trip travel mishaps.

In 1989 he wrote the first of three baseball books for Philadelphia-based publisher Running Press. His fourth baseball book, Chasing October: The Dodgers-Giants Pennant Race of 1962 was published by Diamond Communications in 1994. In 2012, an updated version of Chasing October was released as an e-book and audio book to mark the 50th anniversary of that season.

From 1991 to 2006 Plaut was book critic for USA Today Baseball Weekly (later renamed Sports Weekly).

In 2010 Plaut collaborated with NFL Films colleague Greg Cosell and former NFL quarterback and ESPN analyst Ron Jaworski on The Games That Changed the Game: The Evolution of the NFL in Seven Sundays, published by ESPN Books. It was the nation's top-selling pro football book that season.

=== Bibliography ===
Title	Year
Start Collecting Baseball Cards, Running Press	1989
Baseball Wit and Wisdom, Running Press	1992
Speaking of Baseball, Running Press	1993
Chasing October: The Dodgers-Giants Pennant Race of 1962, Diamond Communications	1994
The Games That Changed the Game: The Evolution of the NFL in Seven Sundays, ESPN Books (co-author)	2010

== In popular culture ==
In 1973 Plaut provided the voice characterizations of puppet character “Grouchy the Crocodile” for an attraction at Lion Country Safari amusement park in Irvine, CA. The character's voice resembled film and TV comedian Groucho Marx.

Edgar Award-winning author Stuart Kaminsky named one of the recurring characters in his Toby Peters mysteries series after Plaut, who was a film student of his at Northwestern University from 1971 to 1975.

“Lease with an Option to Die,” the October 22, 1985 episode of the TV series The A-Team, featured a villain named David Plaut (played by veteran character actor Brion James). The episode was written by Bill Nuss, a college friend of Plaut's.

== Sources ==
1. Barniak, Jim, “Rocky Task for Rookie,” Philadelphia Bulletin, April 13, 1977
2. Ezkenazi, Gerald, “Movie on Jet Highlights Shows Art of Deception”, New York Times, March 5, 1978
3. Rapoport, Ron, “Short Subject: Highlights for Lowlifes,” Chicago Sun-Times, December 16, 1980
4. Ostrow, Rick, “Artful Editing Makes Eagles’ Highlights Film Worthy of Their Season,” Philadelphia Bulletin, June 9, 1981
5. Canepa, Nick, “For the Charger Fanatic This Show is a Must-See,” San Diego Evening Tribune, September 21, 1984
6. Farnsworth, Clare, “David Plaut: Man Behind the Highlights,” Seattle Journal-American, March 17, 1985
7. Levy, Mary Z., “Super Tape: The Giants Won the Super Bowl but NFL Films Might Have Made the Biggest Score of All,” Video Review, April, 1987
8. Martzke, Rudy, “NFL Films Turns Out Redskins’ Video in a Hurry,” USA Today, February 17, 1988
9. Canepa, Nick, “Chargers Film Better Than Team,” San Diego Evening Tribune, June 1, 1990
10. Coutros, Pete, “Giants Super Season on Video,” New York Post, February 14, 1991
11. Strauss, Robert, “The Clips with Oomph,” Philadelphia Inquirer, December 5, 2002
12. Thompson, John B., “The Football league That Brought Us Madden and Namath,” Gentleman's Quarterly, January 8, 2010
13. Jenks, Jason, “Seahawks Season Chronicled in New NFL Film,” Seattle Times, March 4, 2014
14. Glauber, Bill, “Super Bowl I ‘Lost’ Footage Excites Ex-Packer Greats, Broadcasters, Fans,” Milwaukee Journal-Sentinel, January 14, 2016
15. Spadaro, Dave, “For Your Viewing Pleasure: One Super Bowl Season,” Eagles Insider, March 6, 2018
16. Parlapiano, Amy, “From Munich to Mount Laurel: Creating the Iconic NFL Films Music,” The Athletic, June 25, 2020
17. Ayres, Tim, "Off the Beaten Track: Interview with David Plaut," KHSU Public Radio, December 26, 2021
