= Emrys Jones (literary scholar) =

British literary scholar

Emrys Lloyd Jones, FBA (30 March 1931 – 20 June 2012) was a British literary scholar, who specialised in 16th-century literature and the works of Shakespeare.

Born in Hoxton, in London's East End, on 30 March 1931 to Welsh parents who ran a corner shop, he was evacuated to Glynneath during the Second World War and attended Neath Grammar School where his classmates included the future medieval historian Peter Lewis, arts administrator Roger Howells and television executive David Nicholas. In 1949, he won the three-year Violet Vaughan Morgan scholarship, enabling him to study at Magdalen College, Oxford, after completing his national service as a clerk in the Royal Artillery. At Oxford, he studied English under C. S. Lewis, graduating in 1954 with the top first-class degree in his year. After Lewis's promotion in 1955, Jones was appointed his successor as fellow and tutor in English at Magdalen. He was appointed a university Reader in English in 1977 and then given the Goldsmith's Professorship of English Literature (which meant moving to a fellowship at New College, Oxford). He retired in 1998. Jones was elected a fellow of the British Academy in 1982. He died on 20 June 2012. His wife was the literary scholar Barbara Everett, with whom he appeared in the 1996 documentary Looking for Richard., and they had one daughter, Hester, a lecturer at the University of Bristol.

== Bibliography ==
- (ed.) Henry Howard, Earl of Surrey, Poems, Clarendon Medieval and Tudor Series (Oxford: Clarendon Press, 1964)
- Scenic Form in Shakespeare (Oxford: Clarendon Press, 1971)
- The Origins of Shakespeare (Oxford: Oxford University Press, 1977)
- (ed.) William Shakespeare, Antony and Cleopatra, New Penguin Shakespeare (Harmondsworth: Penguin, 1977)
- (ed.) The New Oxford Book of Sixteenth Century Verse, Oxford Books of Prose and Verse (Oxford: Oxford University Press, 1991)
