= Michael Meredith (film director) =

American film director (born 1967)

- Born: Michael Shane Meredith; September 22, 1967 (age 58); Dallas, Texas, U.S.
- Occupations: Film director, screenwriter, producer
- Years active: 1990s–present

Michael Shane Meredith (born September 22, 1967 in Dallas, Texas) is an American independent film director, screenwriter and producer. He frequently collaborates with German director Wim Wenders. Meredith is the son of the late former Dallas Cowboys quarterback and football commentator Don Meredith. He was the oldest of two children from Don Meredith's second marriage to the artist Cheryl King.

== Background ==
Meredith was born at Baylor Hospital in Dallas on September 22, 1967. He is married to Amit Nizan Meredith who is the mother of his children as well as his business partner. His film work includes Wim Wenders' Land of Plenty for which he co-wrote. He also wrote and directed Three Days of Rain and The Open Road.

He founded Maximon Pictures, a production company which has produced work that has won awards. The company is said to be named after the patron saint of good times and good luck.

Meredith was a multi-sport collegiate athlete, playing both basketball and football. As a freshman point guard he averaged 15 points per game. He then joined the University of Texas football program as a wide receiver. He was a member of the Texas Longhorns 1990 championship team, which went undefeated in the Southwest Conference.

== Career ==
=== Film ===
Meredith's first feature film was Three Days of Rain, which starred Peter Falk, Blythe Danner, Lyle Lovett, Jason Patric and Don Meredith. Wim Wenders was also involved with the film.

In 2006, Meredith wrote the screenplay for Wenders' Land of Plenty, which earned an Independent Spirit Award nomination for Michelle Williams.

Meredith wrote and directed The Open Road, starring Jeff Bridges, Justin Timberlake, Kate Mara, and Mary Steenburgen. Wenders was executive producer and Charlie Sexton did the score for the film.

In 2014, Alex Gibney and Wim Wenders partnered with Meredith to make a documentary feature, "Return To Timbuktu", centered on the efforts of Malian musicians trying to restore peace in the war torn Sahara. As of June 2022, IMDb, AllMovie, Variety Insight and other online film databases show that this film has not moved forward.

=== Other work ===
Meredith served as producer, director and narrator of the Ice Bowl episode for NFL Films series The Timeline. The one-hour episode examines the historic game played between the Packers and Cowboys for the 1967 NFL Championship. The show features Meredith's journey over four years and nine states to interview surviving members of the Ice Bowl, and to understand more about the game's legacy and significance 50 years after it took place. The Ice Bowl features interviews with players such as Bart Starr, Jerry Kramer, Dave Robinson, Mel Renfro, Pettis Norman, Chuck Mercein, Lance Rentzel and Donny Anderson, former Cowboys Director of Player Personnel Gil Brandt, Cowboys broadcaster Bill Mercer, Meredith's former spouse Cheryl King, and more. Peter King of Sports Illustrated called it “one of the most interesting shows in NFL Network history”.

In 2017, it was announced that Meredith was producing and directing a documentary film titled "First Cowboys" on the origins of the Dallas Cowboys. Roger Staubach, Walt Garrison, Mel Renfro, Pettis Norman, Gary Cartwright, Rayfield Wright, and Ralph Neely, among others, were featured. Willie Nelson and Alicia Landry, wife of the late Coach Tom Landry, were to make appearances. As of June 2022, IMDb, AllMovie, Variety Insight and other online film databases show that this film has not moved forward.

== Filmography ==
FilmsDirector, producer, writer
Title	Role	Year
Three Days of Rain	Director	2002
Land of Plenty	Writer	2004
The Open Road	Director, writer, producer	2009
Martha Graham's Celebration	Director	2010
Hands & Eyes	Director	2010
