= Barbara Everett =

British academic and literary critic (1932–2025)

Barbara Everett in 2024.

Barbara Everett (September 1932 – 4 April 2025) was a Canadian-born British academic and literary critic, whose work appeared frequently in the London Review of Books and The Independent. In addition to her own publications, she is recognised as a leading Shakespeare scholar.

Everett was born in Montreal, Canada. She read English at St Hilda's College, Oxford, from 1951 to 1954. At the time of her death, she was a retired Fellow of Somerville College. She was married to the Oxford scholar of English literature, Emrys Jones, with whom she appeared in the 1996 documentary Looking for Richard.

Frank Kermode described her as "a connoisseur of styles" with "a distinctive style of her own", and her 1986 book, Poets in their time as "one of the finest collections of criticism for years". A selection of her essays, edited by Seamus Perry, was published in 2025 by the London Review of Books, shortly before her death on 4 April 2025, at the age of 92.

== Select bibliography ==
=== Books ===
- Auden (1964)
- Donne: A London Poet (1972), ISBN 0-19-725685-6
- Poets in their Time: Essays on English Poetry from Donne to Larkin (1986), ISBN 0-571-13978-7
- Young Hamlet: Essays on Shakespeare's Tragedies (1989), ISBN 0-19-812993-9

=== Articles ===
- "Shakespeare and the Elizabethan Sonnet". London Review of Books, Vol. 30 no 9 (8 May 2008)
- "Saint Shakespeare". London Review of Books, Vol. 32 no 16 (19 August 2010)
- "Barbara Pym's Last Title". Essays in Criticism, vol 73, no 1 (2023), pages 1–7
