= Land of Plenty =

2004 American drama film

- German release poster
- Directed by: Wim Wenders
- Written by: Michael Meredith; Wim Wenders
- Story by: Wim Wenders; Scott Derrickson
- Produced by: In-Ah Lee; Samson Mucke; Gary Winick
- Starring: Michelle Williams; John Diehl
- Cinematography: Franz Lustig
- Edited by: Moritz Laube
- Music by: Die Toten Hosen; TV Smith; Thom & Nackt
- Distributed by: IFC Films
- Release date: September 9, 2004 (Venice Film Festival)
- Running time: 123 minutes
- Country: United States
- Language: English

Land of Plenty is a 2004 American drama film directed by Wim Wenders starring Michelle Williams and John Diehl.

The title of the film comes from the song "The Land of Plenty" from the album Ten New Songs, written by Leonard Cohen and Sharon Robinson, which was used in the film. The film was Gloria Stuart's last screen appearance before her death in 2010.

== Plot ==
The film presents a view of the post-9/11 United States as seen through the eyes of Lana, an American girl who has lived in Africa and the Middle East for years with her missionary parents. She is returning from a long trip to the West Bank. In Los Angeles, she works at a homeless mission and looks up her only living relative in the US, her late mother's brother, Paul. He is a traumatized Vietnam veteran who drives around filming and spying on Arabs or people with Arab features in the belief that most, if not all are planning terrorist acts on US soil. In contrast, Lana leans toward anti-war convictions and has been changed by her experiences abroad, so she feels outside American culture.

Having first-hand knowledge of the Middle East and Africa, she sees similarities between the slums of Los Angeles and those of the Third World. After she and Paul see the murder of a young Pakistani outside the mission, they take his body to his family. Their road trip offers Paul a different view of Muslim home life. Over the course of the film, Paul and Lana learn more about each other.

== Cast ==
- Michelle Williams as Lana
- John Diehl as Paul
- Shaun Toub as Hassan
- Wendell Pierce as Henry
- Richard Edson as Jimmy
- Burt Young as Sherman
- Yuri Elvin as Officer Elvin
- Jeris Lee Poindexter as Charles
- Rhonda Stubbins White as Dee Dee
- Victoria Thomas as News Reporter
- Matthew Kimbrough as News Anchor
- Paul West as Policeman
- Jeffrey Vincent Parise as Coroner's Assistant
- Christa Lang as Trailer Park Woman
- Warren Stearns as Mortician
- Bernard White as Youssef
- Gloria Stuart as Old lady

== Production ==
Of the idea for the film, Wim Wenders said it "originated with the fundamentalist Christianity of the Bush era. From the anger that Christianity has been so perverted and used in so a perfidious manner for political interests. As a Christian, I know no other option except to be against war and to have solidarity with the poor". He added, "My film…addresses the underbelly of poverty in the United States, and specifically in Hollywood – not only the entertainment capital of the world, but also an unacknowledged capital of hunger. Poverty was not the main subject of the film, but more of a backdrop to a film that tried to deal with the post-9/11 trauma in the US. The two issues are linked, of course…The problem is that the social net in America has too many holes that people can fall through; they end up abandoned, lost and without hope, which is even more tragic if you think about the country's wealth and its very own ideals of brotherhood and equality."

The film was shot in 16 days using digital cameras.

In the United States, the film was distributed by IFC Films.

== Reception ==
On Rotten Tomatoes, the film has an approval rating of 63% based on 27 reviews, with an average rating of 6.1/10. Metacritic assigned the film a weighted average score of 62 out of 100, based on 10 critics, indicating "generally favorable" reviews.

Kevin Thomas of Los Angeles Times said, "Hampered by an ending that overreaches needlessly, the film is nevertheless worthy and unmistakably the effort of an enduringly distinctive and important filmmaker." Leslie Felperin of Variety praised Michelle Williams' performance, saying, "Engaging perfs keep its motor running, with Williams in particular charming and convincing as a politically engaged humanist."
