= Brandon Bogotay =

American football player (born 1989)

Profile
- Position: Placekicker

Personal information
- Born: May 8, 1989 (age 37); San Diego, California
- Listed height: 6 ft 3 in (1.91 m)
- Listed weight: 207 lb (94 kg)

Career information
- High school: Patrick Henry
- College: Grossmont; Georgia
- NFL draft: 2012: undrafted

Career history
- Cleveland Browns (2013); Tampa Bay Buccaneers (2015)*
- * Offseason or practice squad member only
- Stats at Pro Football Reference

Brandon Bogotay (born May 8, 1989) is an American football placekicker.

== High school years ==
Bogotay attended Patrick Henry High School in his hometown of San Diego, California.

== College career ==
Before attending the University of Georgia, Bogotay spent one season at Grossmont College in El Cajon, California, where he was named a First-team All-Southern Conference selection after completing 15 of 15 PAT kicks and converting 15-of-23 field goals with a long of 52 yards.

A three-year letterman as a kicker at the University of Georgia (2009–11), Bogotay appeared in 14 contests, while kicking behind current Minnesota Vikings kicker Blair Walsh, who as a rookie in 2012 was voted to the NFC Pro Bowl squad. During his collegiate career, Bogotay handled kickoff duties as eight of his 29 career kickoffs went for touchbacks. He also converted all seven career PATs. As a senior, he made one of two field goal attempts, as his only miss came from 52 yards.

== Professional career ==
Bogotay signed with the Cleveland Browns on April 2, 2013 to compete with veteran Shayne Graham in trying to replace Pro Bowl kicker Phil Dawson. He was released by the Cleveland Browns on August 31, 2013. In the same move the Browns also released veteran kicker Graham and 13 other players. Bogotay was then placed on IR on September 1, 2013. The Browns released him on April 29, 2014.

Bogotay signed with the Tampa Bay Buccaneers on May 28, 2015.
