= Sacred Heart School (Winnetka, Illinois) =

Location
- 1095 Gage Street; Winnetka, Illinois 60093; United States; 42°7′1″N 87°44′43″W

Information
- Type: Private, Catholic
- Religious affiliation: Roman Catholic
- Established: 1902
- School district: Archdiocese of Chicago
- Authority: National Catholic Educational Association
- Principal: Jodi Reuter
- Staff: 10
- Faculty: 29
- Grades: PreK-8
- Gender: Coeducational
- Enrollment: ~200
- Campus size: 1.25 acres
- Colors: Red and White
- Team name: Vikings (Vaders for sports done jointly with St Norbert's)
- Accreditation: Blue Ribbon
- Endowment: >$3m
- Tuition: $7,750 (K-8)
- Website: www.shwschool.org
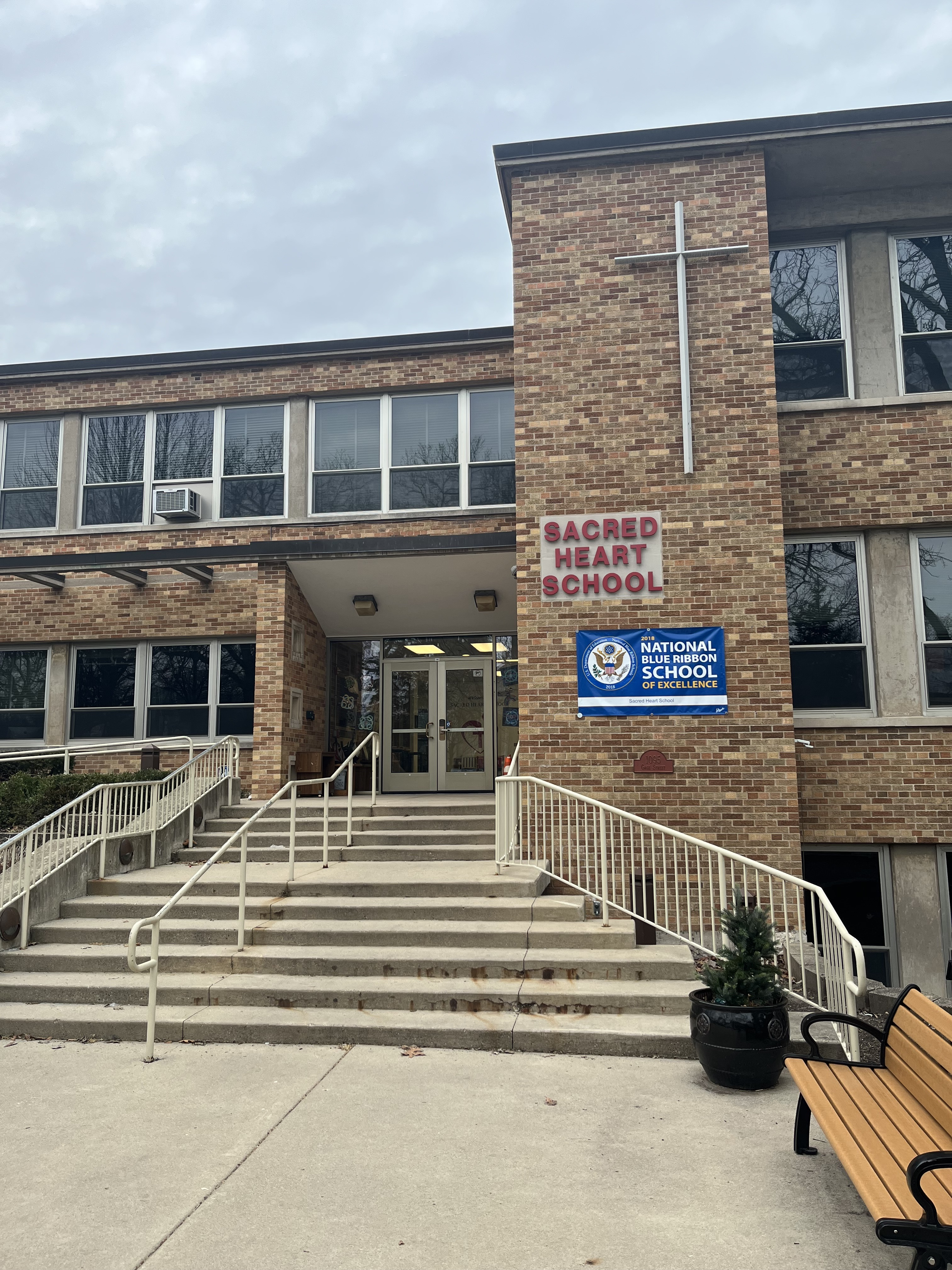

Sacred Heart School is a private, Catholic school located in the Hubbard Woods neighborhood of Winnetka, Illinois and the village's oldest operating K-8 school, having been established in 1902. It serves approximately 200 students from pre-kindergarten through eighth grade. In addition to Winnetka, the school draws from the surrounding communities of Glencoe, Northfield, Wilmette and Highland Park.

Sacred Heart School is part of the Roman Catholic Archdiocese of Chicago and a member of the National Catholic Educational Association and has been recognized by the National Blue Ribbon Schools Program. The school holds an A+ grade from private schools ranking site Niche.com.

== History ==
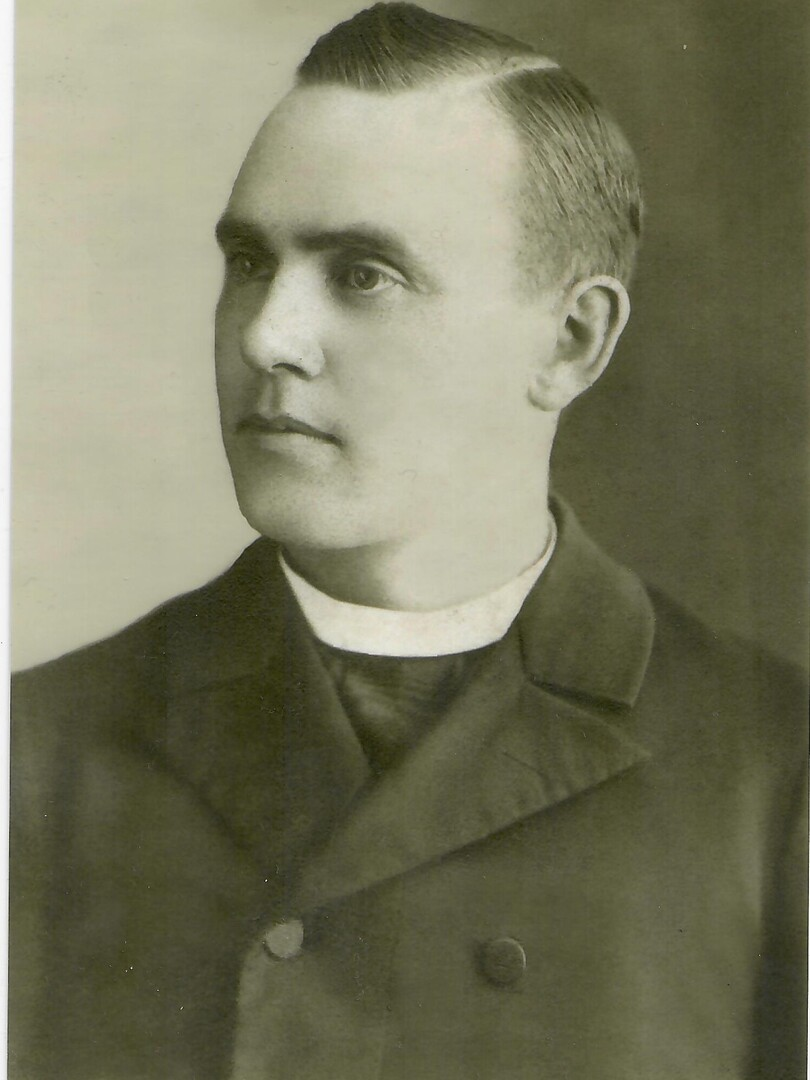
Founding pastor of the church and the school, Fr Frederic Haarth

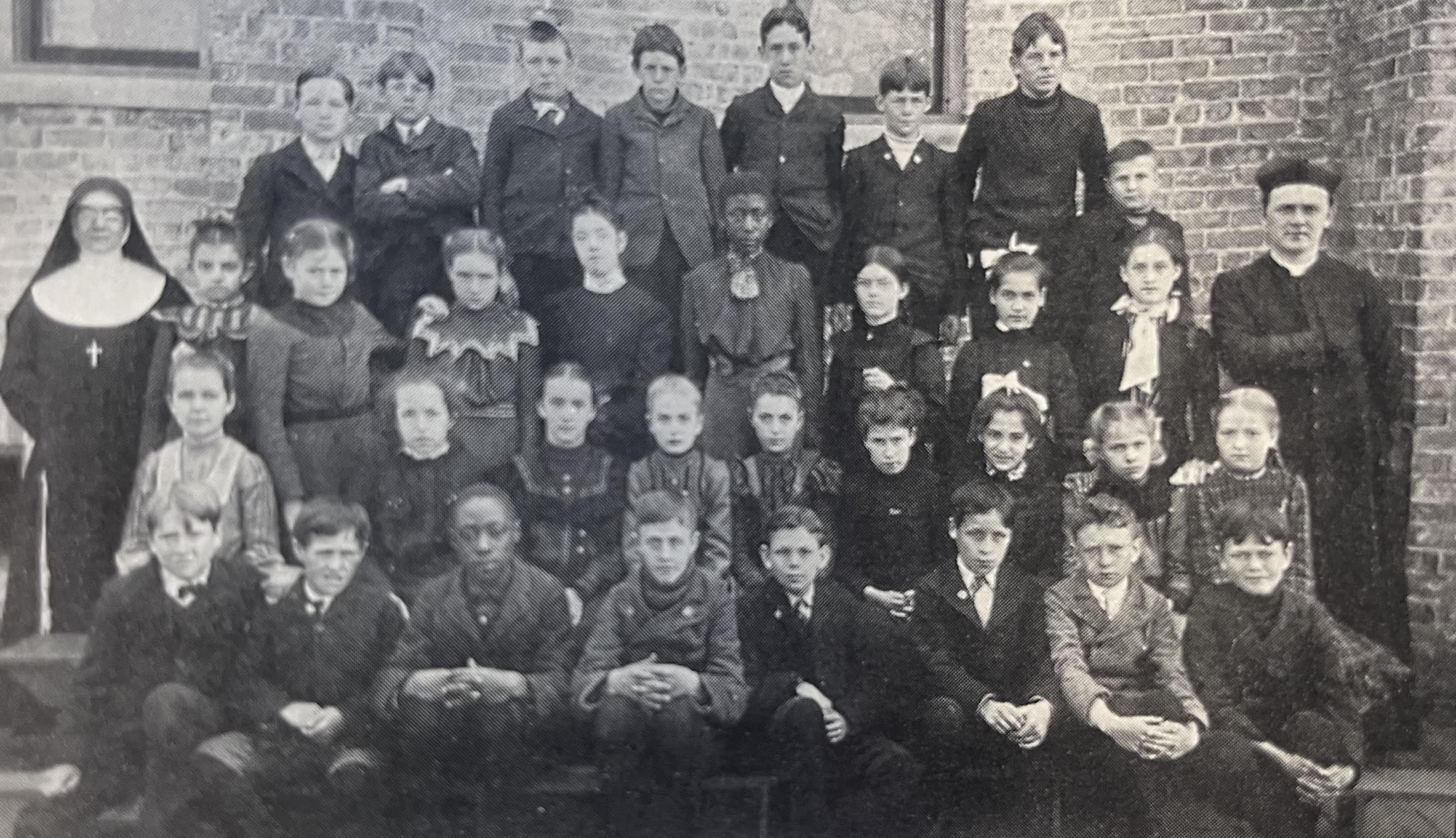
The first school children, 1903, grades six and seven

Sacred Heart School was founded in 1902, as part of Sacred Heart Parish by its first pastor, Reverend Frederic J. Haarth. It originally began with 56 students, and was racially integrated from its first year. When the school opened, it did not charge tuition.

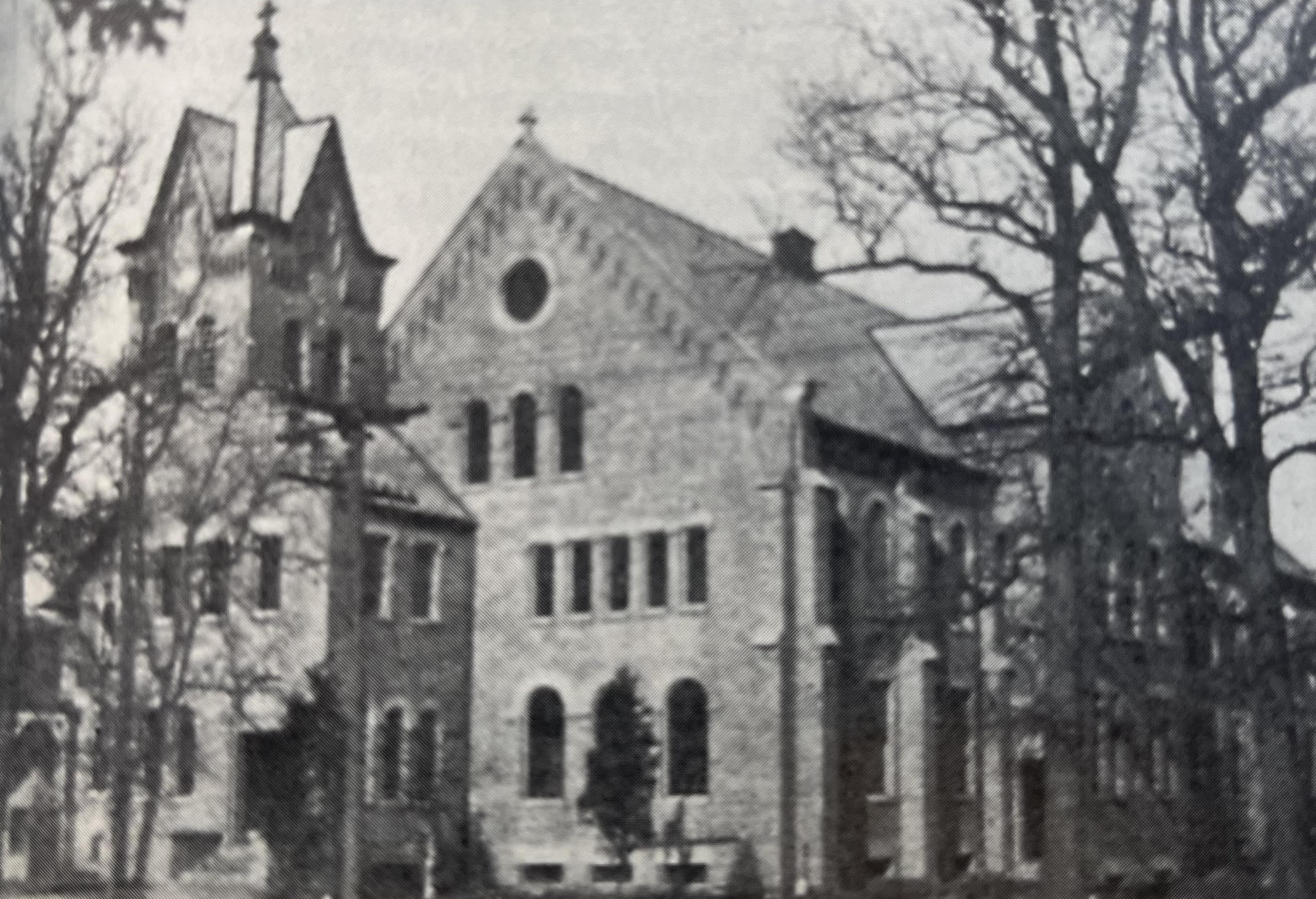
Sacred Heart second church and school building, 1908

The parish and the school grew quickly in the early years, and Father Haarth initiated a major remodeling (underway by spring of 1908) to accommodate, nearly razing the original building and replacing it with a Gothic structure that could serve as both church and school. The school portion, in the same Gothic style adjoined the church on the east side, on Tower Road.

The students were taught by a staff of Franciscan Sisters from Joliet who first lived on the second floor of the original school building, then a convent wing of the school, then in a convent adjacent to the church (from 1957). It's possible Haarth turned to Franciscans because his sister had taken vows of that order.

In 1909, the school had 85 students and a graduating eighth-grade class of nine. In 1917, the nuns' salary was $1.00 per school day. In 1918, during the Spanish Influenza, Fr Haarth noted "Something that never happened in the history of the Catholic Church in this State took place on the Sundays of the 7th and 14th of October [in 1918]: namely, the church was closed and no public services were held on account of influenza epidemic; the school was closed for three weeks at the same time." A little over 100 years later, the school would once again be temporarily closed due to a pandemic.

A new school building opened in 1952 under Monsignor Reynold Hillenbrand, the pastor at that time, and the building was dedicated by the Cardinal Samuel Stritch. At the time, Hillenbrand wrote "“Children are the most important charges of a parish because their lives are just unfolding for them. The school that educates them is most important because they are.” The new three story building included an elevator for handicapped accessibility. The school, with 16 classrooms, a multi-use gymnasium/auditorium, a library, an art room and a faculty lounge would accommodate 334 children that year, and its faculty including ten Franciscans.

In 1957, Monsignor Hillenbrand orchestrated an exhibition of contemporary religious art at Sacred Heart School. Works by Marc Chagall, Henri Matisse and Georges Rouault were among the 137 pieces displayed. The same year, the previous school building and convent attached to the east side of the church was demolished. In 1961, the school reached its highest student population, of 548. In 1963, Monsignor Hillenbrand hired the school's first African American faculty member, to teach sixth grade. At the time, nuns' salary had increased to $6.00 per school day.

The seventies and eighties would prove to be difficult years for the school. Father Rafferty, who became pastor of the parish in 1974, wrote "It was a monumental struggle to keep the school open." This was an issue common to area Catholic schools at the time. When the grade school of Immaculate Conception Parish in Highland Park was closed in 1978, its 60 students were bussed to Sacred Heart. In April 1978, the first Nite Lites fundraiser was held for the school. By 1986, school population had sunk to 114 students, the lowest number since 1943, in part due to a rapid turnover in principals at the time and the reputation of local public schools.

Enrollment subsequently rebounded, and had reached 214 by 1997-1998. In 1997, Nite Lites profits exceeded $180k to support the school budget, and an endowment to support the educational mission of the school was founded in 1995, with an original goal to raise $2m for the school by the year 2000.

In 2018, Sacred Heart Parish merged with St Philip the Apostle Parish to form Divine Mercy Parish. At that time, Sacred Heart School became the school for the newly formed, combined parish.

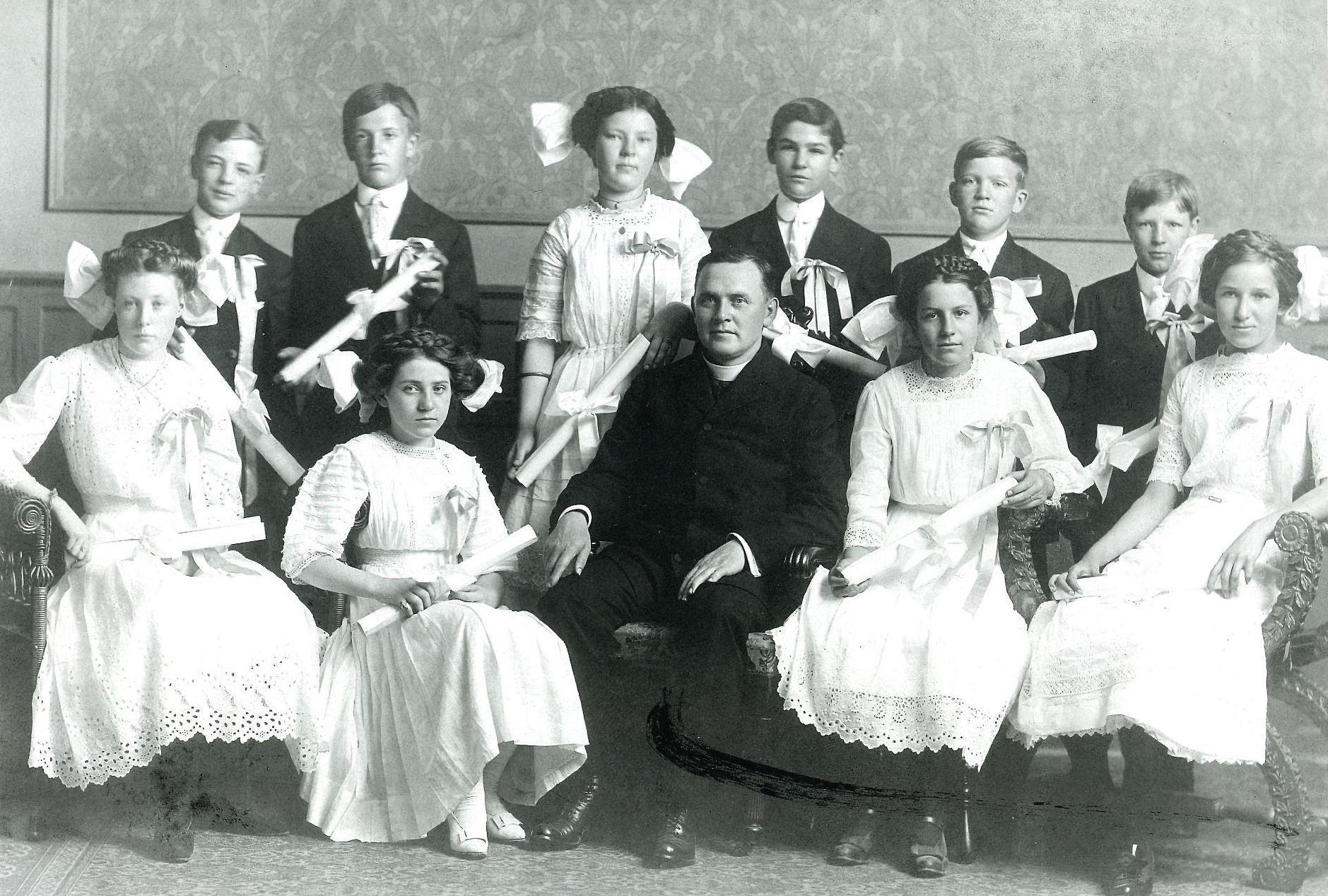
Class of 1911

== Academics ==
Sacred Heart School follows the curriculum guidelines of the Archdiocese of Chicago and the Common Core State Standards Initiative and operates with a low teacher-to-student ratio. The school offers a variety of subjects, including religion, language arts, mathematics, science, social studies, Spanish, art, music, and physical education. Since 2009, Sacred Heart has been an Apple Distinguished School for successful integration of technology, including regular classes in the school's computer lab.

In 2018, Sacred Heart School was named a National Blue Ribbon Schools Program, an honor recognizing the highest-performing public and non-public schools in the country.

In the 2021-2022 school year's i-Ready Diagnostic, 93% of Sacred Heart students tested at or above grade level in math, and 92% tested at or above grade level in reading. Qualifying students who test in are able to attend advanced mathematics programs at Loyola Academy or New Trier High School.

== Notable alumni ==
- Kevin O'Brien (author)
- Chuck Mercein (football player)
