= Penelope Allen =

American actress (born 1941)

Penelope Allen, also known as Penny Allen (born January 29, 1941), is an American stage and film actress and acting coach. She is best known as the head bank teller being held hostage in the film Dog Day Afternoon. She also played Annie, the ex-wife of Francis Lionel "Lion" Delbuchi in the film Scarecrow.

== Filmography ==
=== Film ===
Year	Title	Role	Notes
1969	Oh! What a Lovely War	Solo Chorus Girl	
1971	Doc	Mattie Earp	
1972	It Ain't Easy	Jenny	
1973	Scarecrow	Annie	
1975	Dog Day Afternoon	Sylvia	
1980	On the Nickel	Rose	
1980	Resurrection	Ellie	
1987	The Bedroom Window	Judge	
1992	Bad Lieutenant	Doctor	
1994	Schemes	DMV Lady	
1995	The Crossing Guard	Woman on Bus	
1996	The War at Home	Marjoree	
1996	Looking for Richard	Self / Queen Elizabeth	
1998	Hurlyburly	Dry Cleaner	
1998	The Thin Red Line	Witt's Mother	
1999	A Visit from the Sergeant Major with Unintended Consequences	Mrs. White	
2000	Things You Can Tell Just by Looking at Her	Nancy	
2002	Three Days of Rain	Helen	
2002	Rosy-Fingered Dawn: a Film on Terrence Malick	—N/a	
2009	Passenger Side	Henrietta	
2014	37: A Final Promise	Wino	
2016	Emperor of the Free World	Eurydire	
2017	The Custodian	Homeless Lady	

=== Television ===
Year	Title	Role	Notes
1957	Dixon of Dock Green	Schoolgirl	Episode: "The Name Is MacNamara"
1976	Sybil	Miss Penny	2 episodes
1977	Visions	Mrs. McEvoy	Episode: "The Gardener's Son"
1978	The Fitzpatricks	Mrs. Gerardi	Episode: "Runaway"
1979	The Scarlet Letter	Mistress Hibbins	Miniseries
1980	A Time for Miracles	The Farmer's Wife	Television film
1981	Inmates: A Love Story	Gloria	Television film
1981	American Playhouse	Lee Brecker	Episode: "Until She Talks"
1999	Cosby	Prof. Murdock	Episode: "Lucas Illuminus"
