= Norm Schachter =

American football official (1914–2004)

Norm Schachter (April 30, 1914 – October 2, 2004), born in Brooklyn, New York, was an American football official in the National Football League (NFL) for 22 years from 1954 to 1975. Over his career in the NFL, he worked three Super Bowls (I, V, X) and 11 conference championship games, and was the referee for the first Monday Night Football game, in 1970. Schachter also worked the 1967 NFL Championship Game, now commonly referred to as the Ice Bowl. He wore the uniform number 56.

== Biography ==
Schachter held a doctorate from Alfred University in New York and was a high school coach and English teacher when he began officiating local games in 1941 in Redlands, California.

After earning his degree from Alfred in 1937, Schachter served in the Marines during World War II. Following service in the Marines, he went back to teaching and coaching at Leuzinger High in Lawndale and Washington High School in Los Angeles. In his other career, Schachter wrote a dozen English and vocabulary textbooks, was boys vice principal of Robert Fulton junior high school in the Los Angeles suburb of the San Fernando valley, was the first principal of Richard E. Byrd Junior High in Sun Valley, California, principal of Los Angeles High School, and later was an area superintendent for the Los Angeles Unified School District.

His NFL career began in 1954 when then-Commissioner Bert Bell hired him at $100 a game with a guarantee of seven games.

Schachter retired from officiating after Super Bowl X in 1976, but continued to work with the NFL. He edited the league rule book, helped write the officials' manual, and wrote weekly exams for officiating crews. He also worked as an observer and mentor to new officials. He served as an instant replay official for two years. The game jersey worn by him in Super Bowl I now resides in the Pro Football Hall of Fame in Canton, Ohio.

Schachter died at the age of 90 in San Pedro, California.

== Books ==
- Close Calls: The Confessions of an NFL Referee, 1981 (ISBN 0-688-00794-5).

== Quotes ==
- "Don't waste time second-guessing yourself - there will be millions who will do it for you."

== Memorable Games ==
- Was the referee in the 1967 NFL Championship Game between the Dallas Cowboys and Green Bay Packers at Lambeau Field in Green Bay, Wisconsin, which would later become known in NFL lore as "The Ice Bowl". The game-time air temperature was -13 °F (-25 °C), with a wind chill around -48 °F (-44 °C). Schachter said in an NFL Films presentation of this event that he and members of his officiating crew had to buy cold weather apparel from a sporting goods store in Green Bay before the game in hopes of staying warm. The officials were also unable to use their whistles after the opening kick-off. As Schachter blew his metal whistle to signal the start of play, it froze to his lips. As he attempted to free the whistle from his lips, the skin ripped off and his lips began to bleed. The conditions were so hostile that instead of forming a scab, the blood simply froze to his lip. For the rest of the game, the officials used voice commands of "Stop!" and other various calls to end plays whilst officiating the match.
