= John Rogers (businessman) =

Canadian-born American businessman and executive

John Geoffrey Rogers
- Born: February 23, 1961; Guelph, Ontario, Canada
- Died: November 10, 2018 (aged 57); San Diego, California, U.S.
- Occupations: Businessman, Executive
- Years active: 1978–2018
- Known for: President of San Diego Comic-Con
- Spouse: Janet Tait

John Geoffrey Rogers (c. 1961 – November 10, 2018) was a Canadian-born American businessman and executive. Rogers, who served continuously as President of San Diego Comic-Con from 1986 until his death in 2018, oversaw its expansion from a niche event into an international multi-genre entertainment and comic convention. He was the longest serving president in Comic-Con's history.

Rogers was born in Canada on Feb 23, 1961. His parents moved to Mount Helix in San Diego County when he was just 18-months old. They later relocated to the Del Cerro neighborhood of San Diego, where he attended Patrick Henry High School.

San Diego Comic-Con was founded in 1970. Rogers joined the convention in 1978 while working as a software engineer for a San Diego telecommunications company. He served as a technical coordinator and films coordinator before being elected president for his first term in 1986. He was re-elected president annually from 1986 to 2018.

Each year on the last day of Comic-Con, Rogers appeared in a popular panel called "Comic-Con Talk Back" to answer questions from convention attendees.

Rogers died from complications of glioblastoma, a form of brain cancer, on November 10, 2018, at the age of 57. He had recently been diagnosed with disease on September 10, 2018. He was survived by his wife, Janet Tait, and two siblings, Barbara and David. Officials at Comic-Con praised Rogers' three decades as chief executive saying, "As our longest serving president, first elected in 1986 and re-elected every year since, John's tenure saw Comic-Con grow from a select gathering of fans to the largest and most prestigious convention of its kind in the world."
