= ESPN Books =

American publishing company owned by ESPN

- Parent company: ESPN
- Founded: 2004
- Country of origin: United States
- Distribution: Ballantine Books
- Nonfiction topics: Sports
- Owners: The Walt Disney Company (80%); Hearst Communications (20%)
- Official website: espnbooks.com

ESPN Books is a publishing company operated by ESPN. Started in 2004, ESPN Books has published almost 20 books. ESPN Books also is in charge of producing ESPN's yearly sports encyclopedia. It also runs its own book club and ranks the top-selling sports books in ESPN Borders. Since 2008, it has co-published its books with Ballantine Books.

Authors that have written books for ESPN Books include Bill Simmons, Peter Keating, and Ralph Wiley.

== Books published by ESPN Books ==
- 2007 ESPN Sports Almanac, Mike Morrison and Gerry Brown
- 23 Ways To Get To First Base, Gary Belsky and Neil Fine
- After Jackie, Cal Fussman
- Ali Rap, George Lois
- As Good As Gold, Kathryn Bertine
- The Best Hand I Ever Played, Steve Rosenbloom
- Classic Wiley, Ralph Wiley
- The Dale Earnhardt Story, Introduction by Kenny Mayne
- Dingers!, Peter Keating
- ESPN Baseball Sudoku, no author hmm
- ESPN College Football Encyclopedia, Michael MacCambridge
- Man in the Middle, John Amaechi
- Meat Market: Inside the Smash-Mouth World of College Footb all Recruiting, Bruce Feldman
- The New Gold Standard, Tim Prister
- Now I Can Die In Peace, Bill Simmons
- Online Ace, Scott Fischman
- Parting Shots From The World of Sports, Steve Wulf
- Rules of the Red Rubber Ball, Kevin Carroll
- The Sixth Man, Chris Palmer
- The Ultimate Highlight Reel, no author
