= The Timeline =

- Genre: Documentary
- Created by: NFL Films; NFL Network
- Country of origin: United States
- Original language: English
- No. of seasons: 3
- No. of episodes: 21

Original release
- Network: NFL Network
- Release: December 3, 2015 – February 2, 2018

The Timeline is a documentary series developed by NFL Films and airs on NFL Network that documents select events of the National Football League.

== Episodes ==
=== Season One ===
No.	Title	Event(s)	Narrator	Original air date
1	Favre Returns	Brett Favre retiring as a Green Bay Packer in March 2008, only to un-retire a few months later to join the New York Jets, and then join the Packers' rival, the Minnesota Vikings, in 2009.	Tim McGraw	December 3, 2015
2	Jersey Guys	The New York Giants, after suffering losing seasons in the 1960s and early 1970s, move from New York City to East Rutherford, New Jersey in 1976 and become a winning team in the 1980s.	Bon Jovi	December 8, 2015
3	A Tale of Two Cities: Part 1	The 49ers–Cowboys rivalry during the 1970s and 1980s. During this period each team had period of decline with the crossroads being the 1981 NFC Championship Game.	Sam Elliott & Jeremy Renner	December 15, 2015
4	A Tale of Two Cities: Part 2	The 49ers–Cowboys rivalry during the 1990s, when San Francisco and Dallas faced each other in the NFC Championship Game three consecutive times.	Sam Elliott & Jeremy Renner	December 19, 2015
5	The Merger	The war between the NFL and the American Football League, and the subsequent merger between the two rival leagues in 1970.	Rich Eisen & James Brown	December 24, 2015
6	America's Game and the Iran Hostage Crisis	The NFL during the Iran hostage crisis. Includes the story of Alex Paen, a Los Angeles-based reporter stationed in Tehran, who made an audio recording of Super Bowl XIV for the hostages to listen to.	George Clooney	December 26, 2015

=== Season Two ===
No.	Title	Event(s)	Narrator	Original air date
1	September 11	The NFL during and after the September 11 attacks.	Mary McDonald-Lewis	September 9, 2016
2	Last Day in LA	The last regular season games of the Los Angeles Raiders and the Los Angeles Rams before they relocated to Oakland and St. Louis, respectively, after the 1994 season.	William Fichtner	September 14, 2016
3	Rebirth in New Orleans	The New Orleans Saints and the city of New Orleans, from the aftermath of Hurricane Katrina to the re-opening of the Louisiana Superdome more than a year later.	Clarke Peters	September 21, 2016
4	Night of the Living Steelers	The 1970s Pittsburgh Steelers, as re-told by horror filmmaker and former Pittsburgh resident George A. Romero.	George A. Romero	October 5, 2016
5	Peyton Manning's Summer School	Quarterback Peyton Manning's off-season workout routine, and how it prepared him and the 2013 Denver Broncos to set several offensive records.	Ed O'Neill	October 12, 2016 August 28, 2016 (First aired on NBC)
6	0-26 Bucs	The Tampa Bay Buccaneers losing their first ever 26 games.	None	November 23, 2016
7	There's Only One America's Team	The Dallas Cowboys getting the nickname "America's Team".	Josh Holloway	November 30, 2016
8	1984 – The Season That Saved Football	The 1984 NFL season, which began at a time when the league was facing declining ratings, the lingering effects of the 1982 NFL strike, and the upstart United States Football League, among others.	Rob Lowe	December 7, 2016
9	Lombardi's Redskins	The 1969 Washington Redskins, the only season that Vince Lombardi coached for that team before he died of cancer just prior to the 1970 season.	Dan Rather	December 14, 2016
10	The Fog Bowl	The Fog Bowl, the December 31, 1988 playoff game between the Philadelphia Eagles and Chicago Bears, including the rivalry between Bears head coach Mike Ditka, and Eagles head coach and former Bears defensive coordinator Buddy Ryan.	John Cusack	December 21, 2016

=== Season Three ===
No.	Title	Event(s)	Narrator	Original air date
1	The Greatest Show on Turf	The St. Louis Rams of 1999-2001, nicknamed "The Greatest Show on Turf", became the first team to score 500 points in a season three straight years, while making the Super Bowl twice and winning Super Bowl XXXIV during that span.	Michael Ironside	September 21, 2017
2	The Tuck Rule	The Tuck Rule Game, the January 19, 2002 playoff game between the Oakland Raiders and New England Patriots, and its aftermath (including Raiders coach Jon Gruden being traded to the Tampa Bay Buccaneers the following season only to face his former team in Super Bowl XXXVII, the Raiders then having a 13-season postseason drought after that Super Bowl appearance, and the Patriots moving on to win five Super Bowls).	Michael Chiklis	October 5, 2017
3	The '91 Falcons	The 1991 Atlanta Falcons including Deion Sanders, Andre Rison and a rookie Brett Favre, including their relationship with hip-hop – particularly their association with MC Hammer via Too Legit to Quit.	Keith David	December 7, 2017
4	The Ice Bowl	The 1967 NFL Championship Game between the Dallas Cowboys and Green Bay Packers. Directed and narrated by filmmaker Michael Meredith, son of Dallas quarterback Don Meredith, who spent four years researching more about the game's significance 50 years after it was played.	Michael Meredith	December 29, 2017
5	The Helmet Catch	New York Giants wide receiver David Tyree's "Helmet Catch" during the final minutes of Super Bowl XLII, that helped his team win the game and prevent the New England Patriots from completing a perfect season.	Morgan Spector	February 2, 2018
