= Ken Kocher =

American football player (born 1980)

No. 97
- Position: Defensive tackle

Personal information
- Born: July 30, 1980 (age 46); Fullerton, California, U.S.
- Listed height: 6 ft 3 in (1.91 m)
- Listed weight: 315 lb (143 kg)

Career information
- High school: San Diego (CA) Henry
- College: UCLA
- NFL draft: 2002: undrafted

Career history
- Green Bay Packers (2002)*; New England Patriots (2002–2003)*; Green Bay Packers (2004)*; Los Angeles Avengers (2004–2005); Columbus Destroyers (2006–2007)
- * Offseason or practice squad member only
- Stats at ArenaFan.com

Kenneth Phillip Kocher (born July 30, 1980) is an American former professional football defensive lineman who played in the Arena Football League (AFL). He played high school football at Patrick Henry High School. Kocher was a Parade High School All-American and a standout at UCLA.
