= Patrick Henry High School (California) =

Public high school in San Diego, California, United States

Location
- 6702 Wandermere Drive; San Diego, California 92120; United States; 32°47′52.80″N 117°03′05.00″W

Information
- Established: 1968; 58 years ago
- NCES School ID: 063432005479
- Principal: Melanie Kray
- Teaching staff: 98.14 (FTE)
- Grades: 9–12
- Enrollment: 2,512 (2023–2024)
- Student to teacher ratio: 25.60
- Colors: Green, gold, and white
- Mascot: Patriot
- Newspaper: The Patriot Press
- Yearbook: The Encounter
- Website: sandiegounifiedhenry.ss18.sharpschool.com

Patrick Henry High School is a four-year public high school in San Diego, California, United States. It is part of San Diego Unified School District. It is primarily attended by students residing in Del Cerro, San Carlos, Allied Gardens, Mission Valley and the College Area.

Patrick Henry High School is accredited by the Western Association of Schools and Colleges. The 57-acre (230,000 m^{2}) campus includes a counseling center, child development center, computer and science labs, a cafetorium, library and a performing arts theater. The mascot of Patrick Henry High School is the Patriot, a reference to Patrick Henry, an American Founding Father.

Patrick Henry High School participates in the Voluntary Ethnic Enrollment Program (VEEP) whereby approximately 600 students travel daily from an underrepresented minority community and are regularly enrolled, full-time students. In 2020, the ethnic composition of the school represented more than 20 ethnic groups, Patrick Henry High School is approximately 39.4% White, 29.8% Hispanic, 15.7% Asian, 8.7% Biracial, 5.8% Black, 0.3% Pacific Islander, 0.2% Not specified, and 0.1% Native American.

== History ==
Patrick Henry High School opened in 1968, and had a grant from the Danforth Foundation as an experimental public school. Founding Principal Donald W. Giddings designed the curriculum around self-selected independent learning around a twenty-minute modular system, independent study and an open campus. Within five years, Patrick Henry became more of a traditional school benefiting from its experimental foundation by the early adoption of advanced placement courses including Art History.

== Academics ==
In 2019, Patrick Henry High School was ranked in the top 4% of the most challenging public high schools in America (888th of 22,000). The rank was determined by the Challenge Index defined as the number of Advanced Placement, International Baccalaureate, or Cambridge tests taken in a year relative to the number of seniors who graduate. Patrick Henry High School offers Advanced Placement and Honors courses in World History, Art History, English, Chemistry, Biology, Calculus. The school offers a modern Visual and Performing Arts program in theater, tech theater, band, orchestra, and choral music. Through a longstanding collaboration with Mesa College, high school students can take introductory college courses for credit. Patrick Henry High School has Engineering Academy to support students’ science, engineering, architecture, design electronics and design interests. In 2017 the school's robotics club, the Patribots, won the For Inspiration and Recognition of Science and Technology (FIRST) San Diego Regional and competed at the international championships in Houston. In 2019, the Patribots won the Utah Regional and competed in international championships.

== School Within A School ==
Patrick Henry High School offers a School Within A School program focused on psychology and child development classes called the Teaching Academy. The Teaching Academy is specifically designed to prepare students for college and career experiences in teaching and early childhood education. It includes two classrooms, one for primary school and one for preschool.

== Athletics ==
Patrick Henry Athletics participates in the California Interscholastic Federation (CIF) and offers the following programs:

Coed Badminton | Basketball (Boys and Girls) | Boys Baseball | Coed Cross Country | Girls Field Hockey | Boys American Football | Golf (Boys and Girls) | Coed Ice Hockey | Lacrosse (Boys and Girls) | Rugby (Boys and Girls) | Girls Sideline Cheer | Coed Sideline Cheer | Girls Softball | Soccer (Boys and Girls) | Coed Swimming | Coed Surfing | Tennis (Boys and Girls) | Coed Tennis | Coed Track | Volleyball (Boys and Girls) | Water Polo (Boys and Girls) | Boys Wrestling |

== Athletic Achievements ==
Notable Achievements by Sport
| Badminton | CIF Champion 1998, 2016, 2018, 2021, 2022, 2023, 2025, 2026 |
| Baseball | CIF Champion 2021, 2022, 2026; State Runner Up 2025 |
| Basketball (Boys) | CIF Champion 1973, 1980, 1982 |
| Basketball (Girls) | CIF Champion 1979 |
| Cheer | CIF Champion 2024; 2026 National Champion |
| Cross-Country (Boys) | CIF Champion 1979, 2002, 2008, 2009 |
| Cross-Country (Girls) | None |
| Field Hockey | CIF Champion 2015 |
| Football | CIF Champion 2021 |
| Girls Beach Volleyball | None |
| Girls Flag Football | CIF Champion 2025 |
| Golf (Boys) | CIF Champion 1970, 1992 |
| Golf (Girls) | None |
| Gymnastics (Boys) | CIF Champion 1969, 1970, 1971, 1972 |
| Gymnastics (Girls) | CIF Champion 1983 |
| Lacrosse (Boys) | CIF Champion 2021, 2022, 2026; State Champion 1995 |
| Lacrosse (Girls) | CIF Champion 2019 |
| Soccer (Boys) | CIF Champion 1998, 2020 |
| Soccer (Girls) | CIF Champion 2023; State Champion 2025 |
| Softball | CIF Champion 1975, 1977, 1992, 1993, 2005 |
| Swim and Dive (Boys) | None |
| Swim and Dive (Girls) | CIF Champion 1999 |
| Tennis (Boys) | None |
| Tennis (Girls) | CIF Champion 2018, 2026 |
| Track and Field (Boys) | CIF Champion 1976 |
| Track and Field (Girls) | None |
| Water Polo (Boys) | CIF Champion 2019 |
| Water Polo (Girls) | CIF Champion 2025 |
| Wrestling (Boys) | None |
| Wrestling (Girls) | None |
| Volleyball (Boys) | None |
| Volleyball (Girls) | None |

== International ==
=== Twinning arrangements ===
The high-school has long established exchange partnerships with the Institution Saint Michel located in Solesmes, France. Common projects were carried out with Saint-Michel for the World Forum Lille where cohorts of Patrick Henry High School students presented their work in France on water pollution and the environmental impact of pesticides.

== Notable incidents ==
On January 5, 1984, the San Diego Police Department executed a narcotics raid arresting 63 Patrick Henry High School students, who had allegedly sold drugs to an undercover officer posing as a student.

On January 3, 2007 the San Diego Police Department executed a narcotics raid resulting in the arrest of 15 students from Patrick Henry and University City High Schools who allegedly sold narcotics to undercover San Diego Police Department officers posing as students.

In October 2011, Patrick Henry elected the nation's first lesbian couple as homecoming king and queen. The story was covered internationally, leading to both support and opposition.

In February 2012, following a new school policy limiting bathroom breaks during student advisory periods, a teacher allegedly told a female student who asked to go to the bathroom that she would have to urinate in a bucket in a back room. Due to subsequent bullying which followed her despite two school transfers and led to a suicide attempt, the student sued the San Diego Unified School District. In 2017, she was awarded $1.25 million in damages by a Superior Court jury.

On March 17, 2012, a campus police officer was arrested on charges of auto theft and driving under the influence, after taking the wheel of a shuttle-bus while intoxicated.

On March 22, 2012, three Patrick Henry students organized a protest to defend their teachers who had recently been terminated by the San Diego Unified School District. Students signed a petition, wrote letters to the Superintendent of the San Diego Unified School District and other members of the school board. Additionally, over 200 students participated in a walk-out for an hour to show their support for their teachers.

== Notable alumni ==
| Name | Grad Class | Category | Best Known For |
|---|---|---|---|
| Annette Bening | 1975 | Entertainment | Four-time Academy Award nominee, two-time Tony Award nominee, and winner of a BAFTA Award, Screen Actors Guild Award, and two Golden Globe Awards |
| Ariana Berlin | 2005 | Sports | Four-time All-American UCLA Bruins gymnast |
| Brandon Bogotay | 2007 | Sports | Former NFL player, kicker for Cleveland Browns and Tampa Bay Buccaneers |
| Dante (Jay Dante Rusciolelli) | 1988 | Entertainment | Stand-up comedian, actor, writer, producer, and director |
| Garth DeFelice | 1972 | Sports | NFL referee, officiated Super Bowl XL |
| Hayden Epstein | 1995–1996 | Sports | Former NFL player, kicker for Jacksonville Jaguars and Minnesota Vikings |
| Steve Fairchild | 1975 | Sports | Former NFL coach and Colorado State head coach |
| Anthony Farace | N/A | Sports | Former professional soccer player |
| Aaron Harang | 1996 | Sports | Former Major League Baseball pitcher |
| Tony Harnell | 1977–1978 | Entertainment | Singer-songwriter for 1980s hard rock band TNT |
| Eric Helfand | 1987 | Sports | Former MLB player, catcher for Oakland Athletics |
| David Hensley | 2014 | Sports | Major League Baseball player, infielder for Miami Marlins |
| Eric Karros | 1985 | Sports | Former MLB player, first baseman for Los Angeles Dodgers, Chicago Cubs, and Oakland Athletics; National League Rookie of the Year and Silver Slugger Award winner |
| Ken Kocher | 1998 | Sports | Former NFL player, defensive lineman for Green Bay Packers; Arena Football League player for Columbus Destroyers |
| Joel Kramer | 1973 | Sports | Former NBA player, power forward/center for Phoenix Suns |
| Joe LaCava | 1972 | Politics | Member of the San Diego City Council, 1st District, 2020–present |
| Russ Lorenson | 1981 | Entertainment | Actor, singer, and composer |
| Ericka Lorenz | 1999 | Sports | US Olympic water polo player |
| Rosemary Bryant (Merims) Mariner | 1970 | Military | First female military pilot to fly a tactical jet |
| Brian Stokes Mitchell | 1974 | Entertainment | Tony Award-winning actor, singer, and composer |
| Lisa Morton | 1976 | Entertainment | Bram Stoker Award-winning author and screenwriter |
| Matt Nokes | 1981 | Sports | Former MLB player, catcher |
| DeWayne Patmon | 1997 | Sports | Former NFL player, safety for New York Giants |
| Dezmon Patmon | 2016 | Sports | NFL and CFL player |
| David Plaut | 1971 | Entertainment | Emmy Award-winning filmmaker at NFL Films |
| John Rogers | 1978 | Entertainment | President of San Diego Comic-Con |
| RuPaul (Andre Charles) | 1979 | Entertainment | Celebrity drag queen, television judge, recording artist, and model |
| Brenda Spencer | 1980 | Incarcerated | Convicted murderer (did not graduate with her 1980 class) |
| Ricky Williams | 1995 | Sports | Former NFL player, running back for New Orleans Saints, Miami Dolphins, Baltimore Ravens, Heisman Trophy winner |
| Kellen Winslow Jr. | 1997–1999 | Sports | Former NFL player, tight end for Cleveland Browns, convicted sex offender (note: did not graduate with his class) |
| Joshua D. Wright | 1995 | Law | Antitrust law expert and former commissioner of the Federal Trade Commission |
| Joanna Zeiger | 1988 | Sports | Olympic and world champion triathlete, and author |
| Sal Zizzo | 2005 | Sports | Former professional soccer player for Bundesliga, Major League Soccer, United States men's national soccer team, and San Diego Loyal SC |
