= Three Days of Rain (film) =

- Directed by: Michael Meredith
- Written by: Michael Meredith
- Produced by: Philip Bligh; Brad Hillstrom; Christine U. King; Bruce Randolph Tizes
- Starring: Penelope Allen; Erick Avari; Alimi Ballard
- Distributed by: Rogue Arts
- Release date: May 17, 2002 (U.S.)
- Running time: 96 minutes
- Country: United States
- Language: English

Three Days of Rain is a 2002 American drama film directed by Michael Meredith and starring Penelope Allen, Erick Avari, and Alimi Ballard. Based on Anton Chekhov's short stories, the plot takes place in Cleveland city during a rainstorm.

== Plot ==
Three Days of Rain is a film from 2002 that takes six short stories by Anton Chekhov and sets them in modern-day Cleveland, Ohio. The film opens as a storm rolls into Cleveland that will bring rain for three straight days. The film follows six separate people through their unique struggles and challenges. A young woman who is forced to give up her daughter and is willing to do anything to be with her. Another character is a cab driver who struggles to cope with the loss of his son. There is Thunder (Michael Santoro), a tile maker fighting to keep his business from going under, and Denis (Joey Billow), a mentally handicapped janitor who is faced with losing his job. Throughout the entire film there is soft jazz and the banter of a local Cleveland disk jockey. The jazz also doubles as the film's soundtrack.

== Cast ==
=== Main cast ===
- Penelope Allen as Helen (Credited as Penny Allen)
- Erick Avari as Alex
- Alimi Ballard as Derrick
- Joey Bilow as Denis
- Bruce Bohne as Cranston
- Robert Casserly as Ray
- Laurie Coleman as Reporter
- Chuck Cooper as Jim
- Blythe Danner as Woman in Cab
- Peter Falk as Waldo

=== Supporting cast ===
- Mark Feuerstein as Car Buyer
- Heather Kafka as Lisa
- Peter Kalos as Ghost
- Christine Karl as Liza
- Merle Kennedy as Tess
- Claire Kirk as Margaret
- George Kuchar as Vendor
- Lyle Lovett as Disc Jockey
- John Carroll Lynch as Dinner Guest
- Don Meredith as John Horton
- Wayne Rogers as Business Man
- Michael Santoro as Thunder
- Peter Henry Schroeder as Amon
- Bill Stockton as Michael
- Maggie Walker as Jen (Credited as Maggi Walker)

=== Cameo/Uncredited cast ===
- Robert Carradine as Bus Driver
- Keir Dullea as Extra
- Jordan Elliot as Young Tess
- Jason Patric as Extra
- Max Perlich as Extra
- Frank Gifford as Extra

== Credits ==
- Director: Michael Meredith
- Script: Michael Meredith
- Executive producer: Philip Bligh, Brad Hillstrom, Christine U. King, Bruce Randolph Tizes
- Producer: Robert Casserly, Bill Stockton

== Reception ==
Three Days of Rain has an approval rating of 40% on review aggregator website Rotten Tomatoes, based on 10 reviews, and an average rating of 5.3/10. Metacritic assigned the film a weighted average score of 52 out of 100, based on 12 critics, indicating "mixed or average reviews".

=== Critical response ===
Jeannette Catsoulis of The New York Times wrote: "Inspired by Chekhov's short stories, "Three Days of Rain" belongs to the now-familiar genre of overlapping tales of urban desperation staked out by Robert Altman in Short Cuts and seen most recently in Paul Haggis' Crash".

Roger Ebert wrote: ""You’re not a kind person," a husband says to his wife of many years, after she won’t give a doggie bag to a homeless man who asks for it. This is something he didn’t realize and can’t live with. There are other people, kind and unkind, in Three Days of Rain, and as a storm crouches over Cleveland, we wonder if it makes much difference. It is not a kind world."

Sheri Linden of The Hollywood Reporter wrote: "Three Days of Rain is an auspicious feature debut for writer-director Michael Meredith and a fitting opener for the fifth Method Fest, which spotlights independent films with an accent on acting. Inspired by the short stories of Anton Chekhov, Meredith has woven together a half-dozen portraits of contemporary lives-on-the-edge in this quietly searing drama. Presented under the aegis of Wim Wenders, the film deserves further festival exposure and could see art house action in the hands of the right distributor."

Noel Murray of The A.V. Club wrote: "Meredith has a stellar cast to work with, and they do more with their flat lines than an amateur would. Meredith has his father Don—yes, that Don Meredith—doing a sympathetic, understated turn as a cabbie trying not to grieve openly over his son's death. He's also got Peter Falk, amusingly chewing the scenery as an alcoholic trying to reconnect with his son, and fine character actor Erick Avari as a wealthy man so appalled by his wife's indifference to a panhandler that he reassesses his whole value system. The performances are uneven, and Meredith lets some of his bigger names run wild—like Blythe Danner, who makes a cameo appearance in an odd freak-out scene—but mostly, the old pros keep the movie running."

Ronnie Scheib of Variety wrote: "Theater helmer Michael Meredith's tyro film effort takes six interwoven stories loosely adapted from Chekov and soaks them in equal measures of rain, jazz and bathos. "Rain" strives for a "Magnolia"-type tapestry of quiet desperation. After 90 unremitting minutes of badly acted, atrociously written histrionic misery, pic leaves one praying for frogs."
