= 1967 NFL Championship Game =

NFL championship game commonly referred to as the "Ice Bowl"

Coordinates: 44.501°N 88.062°W

- 1967 NFL Championship Game official program
Dallas Cowboys (Capitol, Eastern) (9–5)	Green Bay Packers (Central, Western) (9–4–1)
17	21
Head coach: Tom Landry	Head coach: Vince Lombardi
	1	2	3	4	Total
DAL	0	10	0	7	17
GB	7	7	0	7	21
- Date: December 31, 1967
- Stadium: Lambeau Field; Green Bay, Wisconsin
- MVP: Bart Starr (Quarterback; Green Bay)
- Favorite: Packers by 6½
- Referee: Norm Schachter
- Attendance: 50,861

TV in the United States
- Network: CBS
- Announcers: Ray Scott (1st half) & Jack Buck (2nd half) (play by play), Frank Gifford (color commentator), and Pat Summerall & Tom Brookshier (sideline reporters)
- Nielsen ratings: 32.9

Radio in the United States
- Network: CBS (national); KLIF (Dallas); WTMJ (Milwaukee)
- Announcers: Jack Drees, Jim Morse (CBS); Bill Mercer, Blackie Sherrod (KLIF); Ted Moore, Chuck Johnson (WTMJ)

Location in the United States
Location in Wisconsin

The 1967 NFL Championship Game, commonly referred to as the Ice Bowl, was the 35th NFL championship, played on December 31 at Lambeau Field in Green Bay, Wisconsin.

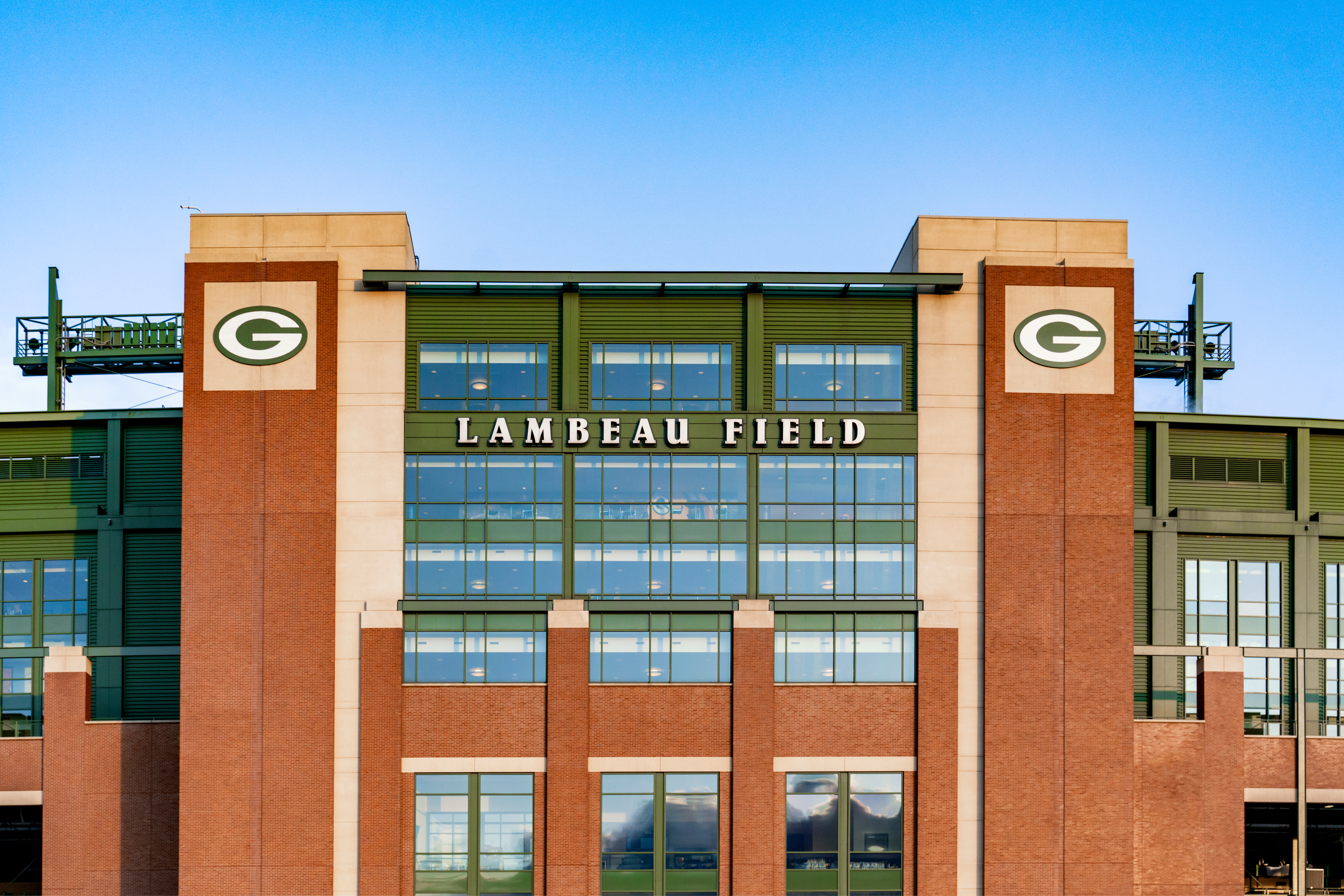
Lambeau Field, the site of the game, in 2019.

It determined the NFL's champion, which met the AFL's champion in Super Bowl II, formerly referred to as the second AFL–NFL World Championship Game. The Dallas Cowboys (9–5), champions of the Eastern Conference, traveled north to meet the Western champion Green Bay Packers (9–4–1), the two-time defending league champions. It was a rematch of the previous year's title game, and pitted two future Hall of Fame head coaches against each other, Tom Landry of the Cowboys and Vince Lombardi of the Packers. The two head coaches had a long history together, as both had coached together on the staff of the late 1950s New York Giants, with Lombardi serving as offensive coordinator and Landry as defensive coordinator.

Because of the adverse conditions in which the game was played, the rivalry between the two teams, and the game's dramatic climax, it has been immortalized as the Ice Bowl and is considered one of the greatest games in NFL history. NFL 100 Greatest Games ranked this game as the 3rd greatest game of all time. With the temperature at kickoff at −13 °F (−25 °C), it is still the coldest game ever played in NFL history.

Leading up to the 50th Anniversary of the game, NFL Films released an episode of its Timeline series about the events that day and the lasting impact. The episode is narrated and co-produced by filmmaker Michael Meredith, whose father Don Meredith was the quarterback for the Cowboys that day.

== Route to the NFL championship ==
The NFL added a sixteenth team in 1967 and realigned to four divisions, with each winner advancing to the postseason. Future hall of fame head coach Tom Landry of Dallas led his team to first place in the Capitol Division with a 9–5 record. The Green Bay Packers, and future hall of fame head coach Vince Lombardi, won the Central Division with a 9–4–1 record.

=== 1967 NFL playoffs ===
In the first round of the four-team playoffs, the Cowboys met the Century Division champions, the Cleveland Browns (9–5) for the Eastern Conference title. In the Western Conference, the Packers hosted the Los Angeles Rams (11–1–2), the Coastal Division champions (with the league's best record). The Baltimore Colts of the Coastal Division were also 11–1–2, but lost the tiebreaker to the Rams and were excluded from the postseason.

At the Cotton Bowl, in a spectacular game by quarterback Don Meredith, the Cowboys obliterated the Browns 52–14. In the week prior to the Rams game, Vince Lombardi inspired his team all week with a rendition of St. Paul's Run to Win letter to the Corinthians and, in what Bart Starr would later say was Lombardi's most rousing pre-game speech, incited his team to a 28–7 victory over the Rams at Milwaukee County Stadium.

The home field for the NFL Championship alternated between the two conferences; even-numbered years were hosted by the Eastern and odd-numbered by the Western. Starting with the 1975 season, playoff sites were determined by regular season record, rather than a rotational basis.

== Buildup ==
The 1967 game was a rematch of the previous season played in Dallas on January 1, 1967, exactly 364 days earlier. More than two years after football had become the most popular televised sport in the nation, this game featured a match up that all of America hoped for in the NFL Championship.

Landry's and Lombardi's paths crossed in 1954 with the New York Giants when Lombardi became the offensive coordinator and Landry, the left cornerback for the Giants, took on the added role of defensive coordinator. Landry was the known for his defensive mind and Lombardi was known for his offensive coaching chops. From a personality standpoint, Landry and Lombardi were seen as opposites of each other. Lombardi was a demanding coach who would respond with elation to success and sadness and anger to the slightest setback. Landry was stoic and calm in even the most tense situations.

The Las Vegas betting line listed the Packers as 6½-point favorites. The Cowboys would employ their vaunted "Doomsday Defense", a nickname given to the defensive unit by a Dallas journalist because it had been successful at making goal line stands. The eight-year-old Dallas franchise was trying to win its first world championship. The Packers were on a quest to achieve what had never been done before in the modern era – three consecutive world championships (Green Bay had previously won three championships in a row, 1929–1931, when titles were determined on a won-loss percentage basis). To the game, Green Bay brought its renowned Packers sweep and the Cowboys brought a defensive scheme, the Flex, which was specifically designed by Landry to stop the "running to daylight" tactic the Packers employed in their sweep. Although the Packers and the Chicago Bears were arch-rivals, Lombardi's most passionate game planning was in preparing for Landry's "Flex".

Saturday, on the eve of the game, NFL commissioner Pete Rozelle called Jim Kensil and Don Weiss, the executive directors of the NFL, for an update on the weather conditions. It is suspected that they informed him that Sunday's game time temperature of about 5 °F (−15 °C) was playable. Rozelle, who in June 1966 had seen to it that the AFL-NFL Championship game would always be in a warm weather city, inquired if the game could be postponed until Monday. Predictions held Monday would be even colder than Sunday and the game was not postponed. Little did they know that the cold front would be far colder and would arrive much sooner than expected. The Packers, who had for years eschewed late-season home games because of the cold winters, would play host to the Cowboys in a game that would mark the coldest New Year's Eve in the history of Green Bay, and the coldest title game in the history of the NFL, a record that still stands. David Maraniss recounts in his 1999 Vince Lombardi biography When Pride Still Mattered that Packers safety Willie Wood left his home Sunday morning to find his car's battery frozen and dead. When a local service-station attendant was summoned to start the car, Wood told him, "It's just too cold to play. They're going to call this game off." Despite the difficulties for both teams caused by the brutally cold and frozen conditions, many Packers felt they had an advantage as the Cowboys were a warm weather team.

== "The Ice Bowl" ==
=== Weather ===
The game became known as the Ice Bowl because of the brutally cold conditions. The game-time temperature at Lambeau Field was about −15 °F (−26 °C), with an average wind chill around −48 °F (−44 °C); under the revised National Weather Service wind chill index implemented in 2001, the average wind chill would have been −36 °F (−38 °C). Lambeau Field's turf-heating system malfunctioned, and when the tarpaulin was removed from the field before the game, it left moisture on the field. The field began to freeze gradually in the extreme cold, leaving an icy surface that became worse as more and more of the field fell into the shadow of the stadium. The heating system, made by General Electric, cost $80,000 and was bought from the nephew of George Halas, George S. Halas. On the sidelines before the game, some Dallas players believed that Lombardi had purposely removed power to the heating coils. The heating system would eventually be given the moniker Lombardi's Folly. The prior convention to prevent the football field from icing up was to cover the field with hay.

The Wisconsin State University–La Crosse (now the University of Wisconsin–La Crosse) Marching Chiefs band was scheduled to perform the pregame and halftime shows. However, during warm-ups in the brutal cold, the woodwind instruments froze and would not play; the mouthpieces of brass instruments got stuck to the players' lips; and seven members of the band were transported to local hospitals for hypothermia. The band's further performances were canceled for the day. Packer linebacker Dave Robinson recalled that the field did not get really bad until the second half, saying that since the halftime show was canceled there was no traffic on the field for an extended period to keep the surface crust broken up. During the game, an elderly spectator in the stands died from exposure.

Prior to the game, many of the Green Bay players were unable to start their cars in the freezing weather, forcing them to make alternate travel arrangements to make it to the stadium on time. Linebacker Dave Robinson had to flag down a random passing motorist for a ride. The officials for the game found they did not have sufficient clothing for the cold, and had to make an early trip to a sporting goods store for earmuffs, heavy gloves, and thermal underwear. Packers quarterback Bart Starr attended an early church service with his father, who had visited for the game, and as Starr later said, "It was so cold that neither of us talked about it. Nobody wanted to bring it up."

The officials were unable to use their whistles after the opening kick-off. As referee Norm Schachter blew his metal whistle to signal the start of play, it froze to his lips. As he attempted to free the whistle from his lips, the skin ripped off and his lips began to bleed. The conditions were so hostile that instead of forming a scab, the blood simply froze to his lip. For the rest of the game, the officials used voice commands and calls to end plays and officiate the game. Nothing was immune from the cold; at one point during the game, CBS commentator Frank Gifford remarked, "I'm going to take a bite of my coffee," as it too had frozen in the mug.

=== Media ===
The game was televised by CBS, with play by play being done by Ray Scott for the first half and Jack Buck for the second half, while Frank Gifford handled the color commentary for the entire game. Pat Summerall and Tom Brookshier served as sideline reporters.

Gifford and Summerall were intimately aware of the personality differences that existed between Landry and Lombardi because they had both played on the New York Giants during Landry's and Lombardi's tenure at the Giants. Over 30 million people would tune in to watch the game.

No copy of the complete telecast is known to exist. Some excerpts (such as the announcers' pre-game comments on the field and Starr's second touchdown pass to Dowler) were saved and are occasionally re-aired in retrospective features. The Cowboys' radio broadcast on KLIF, with Bill Mercer announcing, and the Packers' radio broadcast on WTMJ, with Ted Moore announcing, still exist.

== Game summary ==
Kickoff was shortly after 1 pm CST. The Packers took a 14–0 lead after two touchdown passes from Bart Starr to Boyd Dowler on their first three possessions of the game. However, despite gaining only two first downs in the first half, Dallas scored twice off Green Bay fumbles late in the half to cut the Packers' lead to 14–10.

The Cowboys then started the second half with a long drive into Green Bay territory, but lost the ball on a fumble. However, they took the lead, 17–14, on a 50-yard halfback option pass by Dan Reeves on the first play of the fourth quarter. After missing a potential game-tying field goal, Green Bay scored the game-winning touchdown on its subsequent drive, re-gaining the lead, 21–17, with only 13 seconds remaining.

=== First half ===
Aided by two Dallas penalties and a 17-yard reception from Donny Anderson, Green Bay opened up the scoring with an 83-yard, 16-play drive that took nearly 9 minutes off the clock. Bart Starr detected a blitz coming on the Dallas 8-yard line, audibled, and rifled a touchdown pass to Boyd Dowler, giving the team a 7–0 first quarter lead. Green Bay's defense quickly forced a punt, and their offense stormed back for another score, this time driving 65 yards. After a 13-yard run by Ben Wilson and a 6-yard run by Travis Williams, the Packers moved to a third-and one on the Dallas 43-yard line. Starr faked to Ben Wilson and threw a 43-yard touchdown pass to Dowler who got behind Mel Renfro, making the score 14–0. Then on the second play of the Cowboys ensuing drive, defensive back Herb Adderley intercepted Don Meredith's pass and returned it 15 yards to the Dallas 32. But after a run for no gain and an incompletion, Cowboys lineman George Andrie sacked Starr for a 10-yard loss, pushing Green Bay out of field goal range.

Dallas' offense went the entire second quarter without gaining a first down, but Green Bay committed two costly turnovers that led to 10 Dallas points. First, Starr lost a fumble while being sacked by Cowboys lineman Willie Townes. Andrie recovered the ball and returned it 7 yards for a touchdown, cutting the lead in half. Then, with time almost out in the second quarter, Packers safety Willie Wood fumbled a Dallas punt after calling for a fair catch, and Cowboys rookie defensive back Phil Clark recovered the ball at the Green Bay 17-yard line. The Packers were able to keep Dallas out of the end zone, but kicker Danny Villanueva kicked a 21-yard field goal to cut the deficit to 14–10 by halftime.

=== Second half ===
In the third quarter, the Cowboys finally managed to get a sustained drive going, moving the ball to the Green Bay 18-yard line. But Packers linebacker Lee Roy Caffey ended the drive by forcing a fumble from Meredith that was recovered by Adderley. Then after a Packers punt, Dallas once again got moving with a drive to the Green Bay 30-yard line. But once again they failed to score as Caffey sacked Meredith for a 9-yard loss on third down and Villanueva missed a 47-yard field goal attempt.

On the first play of the final quarter, the Cowboys took a 17–14 lead with running back Dan Reeves' 50-yard touchdown pass to wide receiver Lance Rentzel on a halfback option play. The Cowboys ran the play to their left side, figuring that Green Bay would not expect the right-handed Reeves to throw from that side.

Later in the quarter, a 15-yard facemask penalty on Dallas rookie Dick Daniels during a Wood punt return gave Green Bay the ball on the Cowboys 47-yard line. The Packers then drove into scoring range and had a chance to tie the game, but kicker Don Chandler missed a 40-yard field goal attempt.

The Cowboys then gained two first downs before Green Bay stopped them at the Dallas 38. Meredith had slipped trying to retreat to pass on third down, but got up and fired a desperation heave that landed harmlessly between Green Bay defenders. With just over 5 minutes remaining, Villanueva punted the ball deep into Packer territory, and Wood returned it nine yards before being brought down at the Packers own 32-yard line.

==== The Drive ====
In their last offensive drive, the Packers took possession at their own 32-yard line with 4:50 left in regulation time. With the wind chill around −70 °F (−57 °C) (or −50 °F (−46 °C) according to the revised formula) Starr led his team down the field, toward the south end zone. He began the drive with a double fake to his backs, but after no one was open downfield he flipped a safety valve pass to running back Donny Anderson who gained six yards. Fullback Chuck Mercein then picked up seven on a sweep around right end, and went out of bounds to stop the clock. Starr dropped straight back on first down and fired a 13-yard pass to Dowler over the middle. Cornell Green's tackle slammed the receiver's helmet against the icy turf, and Max McGee replaced Dowler. Dallas end Willie Townes broke through and smothered Anderson for a 9-yard loss on what was supposed to be a halfback option play.

Anderson had told Starr on the sideline that he could pick up 8 to 10 yards on dump passes since the Dallas linebackers were laying back. Starr used this tip to complete two passes to Anderson for 12 and 9 yards, gaining a key first down on the Dallas 30. Anderson juked linebacker Chuck Howley on both plays and ran by him as Howley sprawled on the icy turf. Mercein told Starr he was also open on the left, and Starr flipped him a pass that the fullback carried down to the Cowboys 11-yard line and out of bounds with 1:11 to play. Then Starr called a play he had kept ready for the right situation, 54-Give, a play that Lombardi frankly called the "sucker" play in the Packer playbook. Left guard Gale Gillingham pulled to his right like it was a typical sweep, and Cowboy right tackle Bob Lilly with his great reflexes instantly followed him. The Packers' left tackle Bob Skoronski blocked Cowboy end George Andrie and Mercein shot through the hole to the 3-yard line.

Anderson carried on the next play to the 1-yard line for a first down (some Cowboys thought Anderson scored on this play, but the officials missed it). Twice Anderson attempted to run the ball into the end zone, but both times he slipped on the icy field before taking the handoff and was tackled inside the 1-yard line. The second time he almost fell down before Starr gave him the ball. By then the thermometer read −20 °F (−29 °C), and the Packers called their last timeout. With the low winter sun angle and the shade of the stands, the south end of the field had received a minimal amount of sunlight. The game had started off shortly after 1 p.m. CST, and it was nearing sunset.

==== The Block ====
On third-and-goal at the Dallas two-foot line with 16 seconds remaining, Starr went to the sidelines to confer with Lombardi. Starr had asked right guard Jerry Kramer whether he could get enough traction on the icy turf for a wedge play, and Kramer responded with an unequivocal yes. Summerall told the rest of CBS crew to get ready for a roll-out pass, because without any timeouts remaining a failed run play would end the game. Landry would say he expected a rollout pass attempt because an incompletion would stop the clock and allow the Packers one more play on fourth down, either for a touchdown (to win) or a field goal attempt (to tie and send the game into overtime). But Green Bay's pass protection on the slick field had been seriously tested during the game; the Cowboys had sacked Starr eight times.

On the sidelines, according to Starr, he told Lombardi, "Coach, the linemen can get their footing for the wedge, but the backs are slipping. I'm right there, I can just shuffle my feet and lunge in." Lombardi told Starr, "Run it, and let's get the hell out of here!" Lombardi was asked by Pat Peppler what play Starr would call, to which Lombardi replied, "Damned if I know." Starr returned to the huddle and called a Brown right 31 Wedge. The play was a short yardage play using a double-team block to force an opening for the fullback. Starr made the play call in the huddle, but did not tell his teammates he was keeping the ball. Kramer and center Ken Bowman executed a post-drive block (double-team) on left defensive tackle Jethro Pugh and Starr lunged across the goal line for a 20–17 lead.

===== Radio/TV calls of the Block =====
"Here are the Packers, third down, inches to go, to paydirt. 17–14, Cowboys out in front, Packers trying for the go-ahead score. Starr begins the count. Takes the snap...He's got the quarterback sneak and he's in for the touchdown and the Packers are out in front! 20–17! And 13 seconds showing on the clock and the Green Bay Packers are going to be...World Champions, NFL Champions, for the third straight year!" – Ted Moore, Packers radio announcer

"About a half-yard to go, here come the Packers up again. Mercein sets his feet. Bart Starr's all set...16 seconds left... Starr's in, touchdown!" (About 12 seconds of crowd noise) "And the crowd has gone wild and ran onto the field with 16, 13 seconds left, the Packers are ahead." – Bill Mercer, Cowboys radio announcer

"Starr on 3rd down, 3rd and goal, quarterback sneak, touchdown Green Bay! With 14 seconds left!." – Jack Buck, CBS-TV announcer

==== Conclusion ====
Don Chandler kicked the extra point to make the score 21–17. Dallas downed the kickoff in their end zone, and after two Dallas incompletions the game was over. At the conclusion of the game, jubilant Packers fans streamed onto the field knocking over Packers and Cowboys players alike. Since the playoff era began in 1933, the 1967 Packers are the only team to win a third consecutive NFL title. (The 1931 Packers won a third consecutive, but without a postseason.)

== Aftermath ==
Emotionally, both the Packers and Cowboys players were spent. In the Packers' locker room, the players openly wept. Kramer told interviewers, "Many things have been said about Coach (Lombardi). And he is not always understood by those who quote him. The players understand. This is one beautiful man." Packers linebacker Ray Nitschke developed frostbite in his feet, causing his toenails to fall off and his toes to turn purple. Bart Starr had frostbite on his fingers and several Packer players were suffering from flu-like symptoms. Cowboys George Andrie, Willie Townes, and Dick Daniels also suffered frostbite from the game.

The furthest thing from Starr's mind was the thought of playing in the AFL–NFL World Championship Game. To him, this was the Packers' championship game. Green Bay went on to finish the postseason by easily defeating the American Football League (AFL) champion Oakland Raiders, 33–14, in the second AFL–NFL World Championship Game.

Brookshier and other journalists went into the winning locker room for post-game interviews. At some point, journalists had become aware of the significance of the block Kramer and Bowman had placed on Pugh. Of the eleven cameras Ed and Steve Sabol set up to film the game, the pivot and motion capabilities of Camera Five had become frozen by the time Starr's sneak occurred. This particular camera, however, was fortuitously positioned to offer a perfect view of the block. CBS had been replaying the block repeatedly and had been giving the TV audience a detailed perspective of the workings of the offensive and defensive line.

Frank Gifford recounted in his 1993 autobiography The Whole Ten Yards that he requested and received permission from CBS producers to go into the losing locker room for on-air post-game interviews—a practice unheard of in that era. Gifford, as a New York Giants player and a broadcaster, already enjoyed a friendship with Meredith, and he approached the quarterback for his thoughts on the game. The exhausted Meredith, in an emotion-choked voice, expressed pride in his teammates' play, and said, in a figurative sense, that he felt the Cowboys did not really lose the game because the effort expended was its own reward. Gifford wrote that the interview attracted considerable attention, and that Meredith's forthcoming and introspective responses played a part in his selection for ABC's Monday Night Football telecasts three years later. Defensive tackle Bob Lilly took a different view, telling reporters that the Cowboys were a great team except that they could not win the "big one". Wide receiver Lance Rentzel later remarked that on the team plane home from Green Bay to Dallas' Love Field, "not one word was spoken the entire flight."

=== Final statistics ===
Green Bay Packers 21, Dallas Cowboys 17

Quarter	1	2	3	4	Total
Cowboys	0	10	0	7	17
Packers	7	7	0	7	21

at Lambeau Field, Green Bay, Wisconsin

- Date: December 31
- Game time: 1:00 p.m. CST
- Game weather: −15 °F (−26 °C), Sunny
- Game attendance: 50,861
- Referee: Norm Schachter
- TV announcers (CBS): Ray Scott & Jack Buck, and Frank Gifford
- Pro Football Reference

Game information

First quarter

- GB – Boyd Dowler 8-yard pass from Bart Starr (Don Chandler kick). Packers 7–0

Second quarter

- GB – Boyd Dowler 46-yard pass from Starr (Chandler kick). Packers 14–0
- DAL – George Andrie 7-yard fumble return (Danny Villanueva kick). Packers 14–7
- DAL – Danny Villanueva 21-yard field goal. Packers 14–10

Fourth quarter

- DAL – Lance Rentzel 50-yard pass from Dan Reeves (Villanueva kick). Cowboys 17–14
- GB – Bart Starr 1-yard run (Chandler kick). Packers 21–17

Top passers

- DAL – Don Meredith – 10/25, 59 yards, INT
- GB – Bart Starr – 14/24, 191 yards, 2 TD

Top rushers

- DAL – Don Perkins – 13 carries, 42 yards
- GB – Donny Anderson – 18 carries, 35 yards

Top receivers

- DAL – Lance Rentzel – 2 receptions, 61 yards, TD
- GB – Boyd Dowler – 4 receptions, 77 yards, 2 TD

==== Statistical comparison ====
Statistics	Dallas Cowboys	Green Bay Packers
First downs	11	18
First downs rushing	4	5
First downs passing	6	10
First downs penalty	1	3
Total yards	192	195
Passing yards	100	115
Passing – Completions-attempts	11–26	14–24
Passing – Yards per attempt	3.8	4.8
Interceptions-return yards	0–0	1–15
Rushing yards	92	80
Rushing attempts	33	32
Yards per rush	2.8	2.5
Penalties-yards	7–58	2–10
Fumbles-lost	3–1	3–2
Punts-Average	8–39.1	8–28.8

==== Individual statistics ====
Cowboys Passing
	C/ATT	Yds	TD	INT
Don Meredith	10/25	59	0	1
Dan Reeves	1/1	50	1	0
Cowboys Rushing
	Car	Yds	Avg	TD
Don Perkins	17	51	3.00	0
Dan Reeves	13	42	3.23	0
Don Meredith	1	9	9.00	0
Cowboys Receiving
	Rec	Yds	Avg	TD
Bob Hayes	3	16	5.33	0
Dan Reeves	3	11	3.67	0
Lance Rentzel	2	61	30.50	1
Franklin Clarke	2	24	12.00	0

Packers Passing
	C/ATT	Yds	TD	INT
Bart Starr	14/24	191	2	0
Packers Rushing
	Car	Yds	Avg	TD
Donny Anderson	18	35	1.94	0
Chuck Mercein	6	20	3.33	0
Travis Williams	4	13	3.25	0
Ben Wilson	3	11	3.67	0
Bart Starr	1	1	1.00	1
Packers Receiving
	Rec	Yds	Avg	TD
Boyd Dowler	4	77	19.25	2
Donny Anderson	4	44	11.00	0
Carroll Dale	3	44	14.67	0
Chuck Mercein	2	22	11.00	0
Travis Williams	1	4	4.00	0

== Legacy ==
The game was the end of an era and the beginning of another. This would be the last year the NFL championship game was considered more important than the AFL–NFL World Championship Game, for in the following year Joe Namath and the New York Jets staged an upset victory over the Baltimore Colts that would bring the AFL to full legitimacy and validate the merger of the two leagues that had been agreed upon in 1966 and would be consummated in 1970. Landry, along with others, believed that football games should never be held in weather conditions so harsh. In the post-merger era of the NFL, the Super Bowl would be offered to cities on a bid, and no outdoor stadium in a cold-weather city would be offered the Super Bowl until 2013, when MetLife Stadium in East Rutherford, New Jersey, hosted Super Bowl XLVIII on February 2, 2014. The NFL, reflecting the impact the "Ice Bowl" had on the sport, considered the selection of MetLife Stadium to be a "one off" occasion. Fortunately, the temperature at kickoff was a relatively hospitable 49 °F (9 °C), and the game just missed a snowstorm that came the following day.

With Green Bay having won five NFL championships in seven years and the first two Super Bowls, Vince Lombardi retired as head coach of the Packers on February 1, 1968, but retained his position of general manager for the 1968 season. Many Dallas players described this game as the most devastating loss of the 1966–1970 period. Having lost this game and the 1966 title game in the winning seconds of each game, Landry was subject to criticism that he was unable to win the Big One, a stigma that persisted until Dallas won its first NFL title in the 1971 season. In the three seasons following 1967, the Cowboys suffered two upsets in the playoffs to the Cleveland Browns, then lost Super Bowl V to the Baltimore Colts 13–16 on a last-second field goal, leading to the Cowboys being labeled for a time as Next Year's Champions. Schramm considered this game to be the turning point to Dallas becoming America's Team because of the way the Cowboys battled back in the game.

There has been a bit of revisionism in some Cowboys memories concerning the game. Frank Clarke thought the Packers' final drive was "lucky football," though Chuck Howley acknowledged that the Cowboys' double coverage on the wide receivers left the backs open underneath. Cornell Green even claimed that a bad pass interference call, "the worst call I've seen in history," on Dave Edwards aided the Packers' final drive: "That was the game." In reality, the play Green recalled in which Starr threw a pass behind Donny Anderson happened back in the first quarter; but the call was defensive holding (Willie Townes held tight end Marv Fleming), a 5-yard penalty, and the infraction occurred before Starr threw the pass. There were no penalties called on either team during the final Packers drive. Even Tom Landry in the NFL Film of the Ice Bowl stated that if he had realized the field was frozen, the Cowboys would have switched to a zone defense.

If the Packers did not score on the final drive, Lombardi likely would not have become the iconic fixture in football that he is. Landry later remarked that on the "tundra" of Lambeau Field the better team lost, and that it was Lombardi's ability to develop character in his Packers that gave them the ability to never lose hope. Schramm believed that Lombardi's installation of the heating-coils under the playing field showed he was more concerned with sportsmanship than winning. At Lombardi's funeral mass in 1970 in New York, Cardinal Terence Cooke gave the eulogy, based on Lombardi's favorite scripture, the "run to win" passage that concludes chapter 9 of the First Epistle to the Corinthians.

Interviewed by reporters amid the Packers' post-game celebrations, Jerry Kramer's comments about Lombardi were widely quoted later. Intimating that past press treatments of the coach, including an unflattering 1967 Esquire magazine piece by sportswriter Leonard Schecter were unfair, Kramer said "Many things have been said about Coach. And he is not always understood by those who quote him. The players understand. This is one beautiful man."

The synergy between Gifford and Meredith in the post-game interview prompted Roone Arledge to team Gifford with Meredith and Howard Cosell for the second season of Monday Night Football in 1971. Don Meredith would never win a championship, but he would later become more famous as an announcer for Monday Night Football than he had been as a player. Although Landry and Lombardi were very different, they did respect each other and regarded each other as friends.

A few months later, Lombardi assembled family members, friends and journalists to his home to watch The Greatest Challenge, the 1967 Packers season highlight film, which was produced by Ed Sabol and his son, Steve, and narrated by John Facenda. In the finale of the film, Facenda would say of the Green Bay Packers:

They will be remembered as the faces of victory. They will be remembered for their coach, whose iron discipline was the foundation on which they built a fortress. And most of all, they will be remembered as a group of men who faced the greatest challenge their sport has ever produced—and conquered.

ESPN's SportsCentury ranked it as #6 on the Greatest Games of the 20th Century in 1999, one of three NFL Games to reach that mark (Super Bowl III in 1969 at #3 and the 1958 NFL Championship Game in 1958 as #1.).

NFL Films produced two highlight films of the Ice Bowl itself, one called "A Chilling Championship" narrated by William Woodson, and another version which was the NFL Game of the Week with a different narrator. Those films were then later used to produce the NFL Films recreation of the game in their "Greatest Games Series", released on VHS and on the Packers History DVD.

On the NFL Network's countdown program, NFL Top 10, the Ice Bowl has been named the top or near the top of several lists such as:

- Top 10 Bad Weather Games– #1
- Top 10 Games with a Name– #2
- Top 10 Gutsy Calls– #1 (Bart Starr's sneak)
- Top 10 Clutch drives– #4

The multimedia narrative 17776, which centers on fantastically arduous football games, refers to the 1967 game and to Gifford's "bite of my coffee" jape in its first chapter.

In 2017, NFL Films produced an episode of its series The Timeline about the Ice Bowl. The episode is co-produced and narrated Michael Meredith, a New York-based filmmaker and son of the Cowboys’ quarterback that day, Don Meredith. At the end of his review, Sports Illustrated writer Peter King wrote "I highly recommend you watch this documentary if you love a good history story, or if you love football—or, of course, if you love either team." Among the people interviewed about the game included actor Willem Dafoe, who attended the game as a 12-year old.

=== Ice Bowl II ===
Since the original Ice Bowl game, there have been other playoff games at Lambeau Field that have been dubbed by fans and/or the media as "Ice Bowl II":

- The 1996 NFC Championship Game between the Packers and the Carolina Panthers. It was noted that many Packers fans had hoped for the Cowboys, who the Panthers had eliminated from the playoffs the previous week, to come to Green Bay, since the Packers had played the Cowboys in Dallas in each of the previous 7 meetings between the two teams, all of which were Cowboys victories. The game time temperature lived up to the "Ice Bowl II" moniker, with a reported kick-off temperature of 3 °F (−16 °C) with a −17° wind chill. The Packers won 30–13, earning their first trip to the Super Bowl since 1967. The Packers then went on to win Super Bowl XXXI.
- The 2007 NFC Championship Game between the Packers and the New York Giants. With a game time temperature of 0 °F (−18 °C) with a −23° wind chill, this game was the coldest game at Lambeau Field since the Ice Bowl. A back and forth game, the Giants won in overtime on a Lawrence Tynes 47-yard field goal, 23–20. The Giants then went on to win Super Bowl XLII, upsetting the undefeated New England Patriots. This game was also Brett Favre's last game as a Green Bay Packer.
- The 2014 NFC Divisional playoff game between the Packers and the Cowboys. This game marked the Cowboys' first playoff appearance at Lambeau Field since the Ice Bowl, and their first visit to Green Bay since 2010. Compared to the original Ice Bowl, as well as the other games called "Ice Bowl II", this game had relatively mild temperatures, especially for Green Bay in January, with a game time temperature of 24 °F (−4 °C). This game also had two interesting winning streaks on the line, as the Packers had been 8–0 at Lambeau Field during the regular season, while the Cowboys were 8–0 on the road during the regular season. The Cowboys led for most of the game, with the Packers' Aaron Rodgers, playing with a strained left calf, helping give the Packers the lead late in the second half. Late in the 4th quarter, the Cowboys went for it on 4th down, with Tony Romo throwing a deep pass to Dez Bryant that initially looked like a catch that would've given the Cowboys a first down at the 1-yard line of Green Bay. A replay challenge by the Packers showed that Bryant was unable to complete the reception of the pass, therefore making the pass incomplete and turning the ball over to the Packers, who ran out the clock the rest of the way in a 26–21 win. Coincidentally, the disputed Dez Bryant catch occurred at the 1-yard line of Lambeau Field's south end zone, the same yard line where Bart Starr made his game-winning quarterback sneak in the original Ice Bowl.

== Future Pro Football Hall of Fame inductees involved in the game ==
=== Packers ===
- Vince Lombardi (coach/general manager)
- Bart Starr (quarterback)
- Forrest Gregg (offensive tackle)
- Willie Wood (safety)
- Jerry Kramer (guard)
- Willie Davis (defensive end)
- Ray Nitschke (linebacker)
- Henry Jordan (defensive tackle)
- Herb Adderley (cornerback)
- Dave Robinson (linebacker)

=== Cowboys ===
- Tex Schramm (GM)
- Tom Landry (coach)
- Gil Brandt (director of personnel)
- Bob Lilly (defensive tackle)
- Mel Renfro (cornerback)
- Rayfield Wright (offensive tackle)
- Bob Hayes (wide receiver)
- Chuck Howley (linebacker)

== Officials ==
- Referee: (56) Norm Schachter
- Umpire: (57) Joe Connell
- Head linesman: (30) George Murphy
- Line judge: (28) Bill Schleibaum
- Back judge: (25) Tom Kelleher
- Field judge: (34) Fritz Graf
- Alternate referee: (32) Jim Tunney
- Alternate umpire: (36) Pat Harder

The NFL had six game officials in 1967; the line judge was added two seasons earlier in 1965 and the side judge arrived eleven years later in 1978.

== See also ==
- 1967 NFL playoffs
- Cowboys–Packers rivalry
- 1967 NFL season
- History of the NFL championship
- List of nicknamed NFL games and plays
- 1967 American Football League Championship Game
- Freezer Bowl: Considered the coldest game in NFL history with wind chill
- Epic in Miami: Considered the hottest postseason game in NFL history
- 65th Grey Cup: The CFL championship game of 1977 that was also nicknamed “The Ice Bowl”

== Sources ==
- Claerbaut, David (2004), Bart Starr: When Leadership Mattered, Lanham, MD: Taylor Trade Publishing ISBN 1-58979-117-7
- Davis, Jeff (2008), Rozelle: Czar of the NFL. New York: McGraw-Hill ISBN 0-07-159352-7
- Eisenberg, John (2009), That First Season:: How Vince Lombardi Took the Worst Team in the NFL and Set It on the Path to Glory. New York: Houghton Mifflin Harcourt Publishing Company.
- Flynn, George L. (1976). The Vince Lombardi Scrapbook. New York: Grosset and Dunlap ISBN 0-448-12401-7
- Gifford, Frank and Richmond, Peter (2008), The Glory Game:How the 1958 NFL Championship Changed Football Forever. New York:HarperCollins ISBN 978-0-06-171659-1
- Golenbock, Peter (2005). Landry's Boys – An Oral History of a Team and an Era. Triumph Books. ISBN 978-1572437463
- Gruver, Ed. (1997). The Ice Bowl: The Cold Truth About Football's Most Unforgettable Game. Ithaca, NY: McBooks Press. ISBN 0-935526-38-2
- Gruver, Edward (2002). Nitschke. Lanham, MD.: Taylor Trade Publishing. ISBN 1-58979-127-4
- Kramer, Jerry, and Schapp, Dick (2006), Instant Replay, The Green Bay Diary of Jerry Kramer. New York: Doubleday ISBN 978-0-385-51745-4
- MacCambridge, Michael (2004, 2005), America's Game. New York: Anchor Books ISBN 978-0-307-48143-6
- When Pride Still Mattered, A Life of Vince Lombardi, by David Maraniss, 1999, (ISBN 0-684-84418-4)
- O'Brien, Michael (1987), Vince: A Personal Biography of Vince Lombardi. New York: William Morrow and Company, Inc. ISBN 0-688-07406-5
- Phillips, Donald T. (2001), Run to Win. New York: St. Martin's Griffin. ISBN 0-312-27298-7 (hc)
- Ribowski, Mark (2014). The Last Cowboy: A Life of Tom Landry. New York: Liveright Publishing Corporation. ISBN 978-0871403339
- Shropshire, Mike. (1997). The Ice Bowl. New York: Donald I. Fine Books. ISBN 1-55611-532-6
- St. John, Bob (2000). Landry: The Legend and the Legacy. Nashville: Word Publishing ISBN 0-8499-1670-4
