= Ralph Wiley =

American sports journalist (1952–2004)

- Born: Ralph Heygood Wiley Jr. April 12, 1952; Memphis, Tennessee, U.S.
- Died: June 13, 2004 (aged 52); Orlando, Florida, U.S.
- Education: Knoxville College
- Occupations: Journalist, writer
- Writing career
- Genre: Non-fiction

Ralph Heygood Wiley Jr. (April 12, 1952 – June 13, 2004) was an American sports journalist who wrote for Sports Illustrated and ESPN's Page 2. He was well known for his distinctive literary tone and his writings on race in America.

== Early life ==
Born in Memphis, Tennessee, Wiley attended Knoxville College from 1972 to 1975, where he played college football. After suffering an injury, he landed his first professional journalism job at the Knoxville Spectrum. He was a member of Kappa Alpha Psi fraternity.

== Career ==
Upon graduation, Wiley earned a position at the Oakland Tribune, where he quickly climbed up the ranks from copy boy to beat writer and eventually became a regular columnist. In 1980, he coined the famous phrase "Billy Ball" to describe the managerial style of Billy Martin. In 1982, he was hired by Sports Illustrated, where he wrote 28 cover stories over a nine-year period, mainly about boxing, football, and baseball.

Wiley published several books during the course of his career, including Serenity, A Boxing Memoir; Why Black People Tend To Shout; and By Any Means Necessary: The Trials and Tribulations of Making Malcolm X, with Spike Lee.

Additionally, Wiley wrote articles for GQ, Premiere, and National Geographic. He was a weekly contributor to ESPN's Page 2, where he wrote more than 240 columns. His presence on TV included ESPN's The Sports Reporters and regular guest appearances on SportsCenter.

=== Style ===
Wiley was famous for his well-regarded essays on race in America. He was known for his ability to mix street vernacular with literary references, and for his witty, erudite, and sometimes forceful writing style. When writing for ESPN's Page 2, in skirting the line between sports journalism and literary fiction, Wiley wrote many articles in the third person, featuring discursive, jazz-inflected prose and dialogue conducted between himself and a fictionalized character whose identity the writer left deliberately obscure.

== Death ==
Wiley died of a heart attack at the age of 52 on June 13, 2004, while watching Game 4 of the 2004 NBA Finals. Survivors included his companion, Susan Peacock of Orlando; his mother, Dorothy Brown of Washington, D.C.; a son from his marriage to Holly Cypress, Colen C. "Cole" Wiley; a daughter from his marriage to Monica Valdiviez-Wiley, Magdalena Elizabeth “Maggie” Valdiviez-Wiley; and a half brother, Samuel Graham of Memphis.
