= Chuck Mercein =

American football player (born 1943)

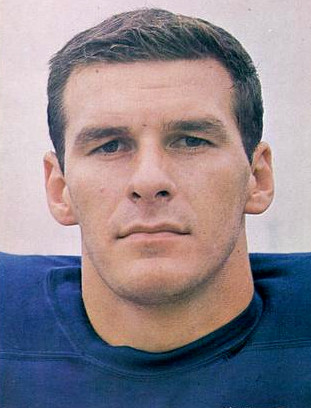
- Mercein in 1965

No. 29, 30
- Position: Fullback

Personal information
- Born: April 9, 1943 (age 83); Milwaukee, Wisconsin, U.S.
- Listed height: 6 ft 2 in (1.88 m)
- Listed weight: 225 lb (102 kg)

Career information
- High school: New Trier
- College: Yale (1961-1964)
- NFL draft: 1965: 3rd round, 31st overall pick
- AFL draft: 1965: 10th round, 79th overall pick

Career history
- New York Giants (1965–1967); Westchester Bulls (1967); Green Bay Packers (1967-1969); Washington Redskins (1969); New York Jets (1970)

Awards and highlights
- Super Bowl champion (II); NFL champion (1967)

Career NFL statistics
- Rushing yards: 531
- Rushing average: 3.3
- Receptions: 37
- Receiving yards: 205
- Total touchdowns: 5
- Stats at Pro Football Reference

Charles Mercein (born April 9, 1943) is an American former professional football player who was a running back for seven seasons in the National Football League (NFL) with the New York Giants, Green Bay Packers, and New York Jets. He played college football for the Yale Bulldogs.

== Career ==
He was selected in the third round, the second player drafted by the New York Giants, the 31st player taken overall in the 1965 NFL draft. He led the Giants in rushing in his second season and after an injury was claimed on waivers and joined the Green Bay Packers midway through the season.

As a professional, Mercein is best remembered for his performance in the Packers' game-winning drive in the 1967 NFL Championship Game, known popularly as the "Ice Bowl". Mercein rushed six times for 20 yards, and had two receptions for 22 yards in the "Ice Bowl"; 34 of his total yards were achieved on that game's final and famous 68 yard drive. He most notably raised both of his arms behind Bart Starr, who had executed a quarterback sneak to score the game-winning touchdown with 16 seconds remaining in regulation time. Because physically aiding a teammate into the end zone is a penalty, he was indicating to the on-field officials that Starr was not pushed forward.

He played for the Packers through 1969, and then with the Jets, before retiring in 1971. Prior to being with the Jets, he was in Washington Redskins training camp, but was released on September 1, 1970.

== Early life ==
Mercein is the son of Tom Mercein, a radio and television personality who worked in Milwaukee, Chicago and New York City during the 1950s and 1960s.

Chuck Mercein graduated first from Sacred Heart School and then New Trier High School, in 1961.

He was an all-state fullback who also was the first Illinois high-school athlete to ever exceed 60 feet in the shot put. His feats of 61 feet, 1¾ inches at Waukegan on April 29, 1961, and 60 feet, 5½ inches at Maine East six days later on May 5 both exceeded the then-state record of 58 feet, 5½ inches. Neither were recognized as an Illinois high school record, which had to be established only at the state championships.

Mercein's acceptance of a scholarship to attend Yale College was based on recommendations from Mike Pyle, a fellow New Trier graduate who had also matriculated at Yale. While at Yale, Mercein was a member of the Phi chapter of Delta Kappa Epsilon fraternity.

== Personal life ==
Mercein's grandson, Ben Mann, plays as a long snapper for the New York Giants.
