= Don Meredith =

American football player and television sportscaster (1938–2010)

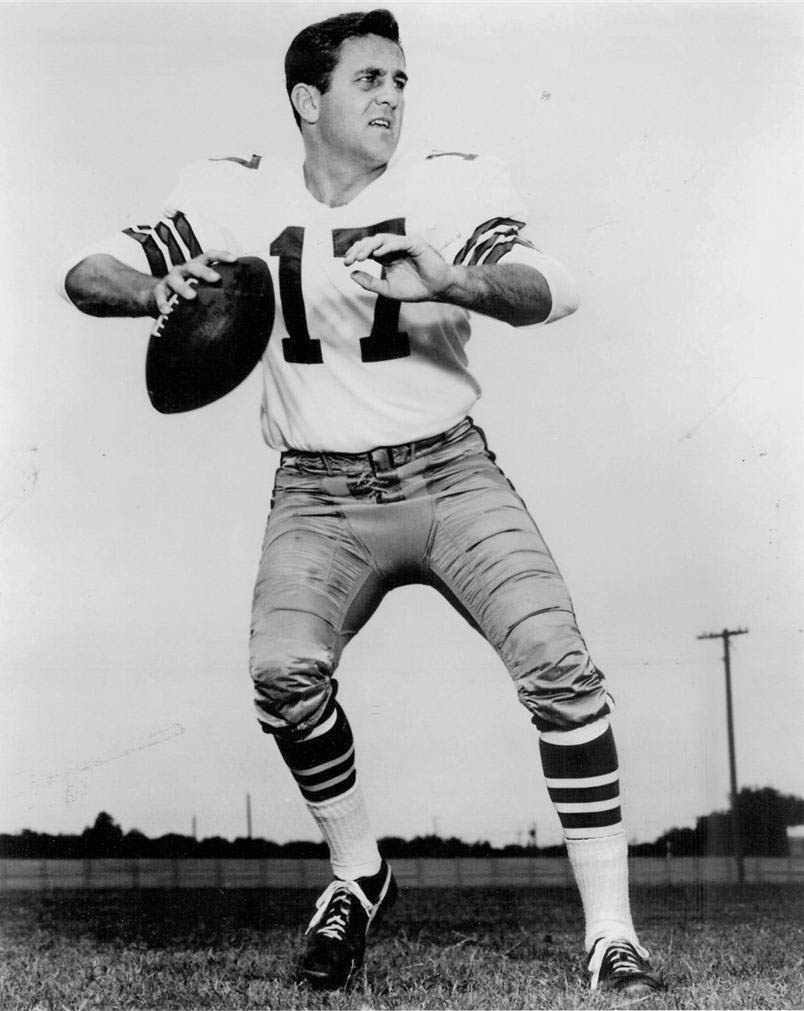
- Meredith with the Dallas Cowboys in the 1960s

No. 17
- Position: Quarterback

Personal information
- Born: April 10, 1938; Mount Vernon, Texas, U.S.
- Died: December 5, 2010 (aged 72); Santa Fe, New Mexico, U.S.
- Listed height: 6 ft 3 in (1.91 m)
- Listed weight: 210 lb (95 kg)

Career information
- High school: Mount Vernon
- College: SMU
- NFL draft: 1960: 3rd round, 32nd overall pick
- AFL draft: 1960: 1st round

Career history
- Dallas Cowboys (1960–1968)

Awards and highlights
- Second-team All-Pro (1966); 3x Pro Bowl (1966–1968); Bert Bell Award (1966); Dallas Cowboys Ring of Honor; 2x first-team All-American (1958–1959); 2x first-team All-SWC (1958–1959); Second-team All-SWC (1957); SMU Mustangs jersey number 17 honored; Pete Rozelle Radio-Television Award (2007)

Career NFL statistics
- Passing attempts: 2,308
- Passing completions: 1,170
- Completion percentage: 50.7%
- TD–INT: 135–111
- Passing yards: 17,199
- Passer rating: 74.8
- Stats at Pro Football Reference
- College Football Hall of Fame

Joseph Donald Meredith (April 10, 1938 – December 5, 2010), nicknamed "Dandy Don", was an American football player, sports commentator, and actor. He was a quarterback for nine seasons with the Dallas Cowboys of the National Football League (NFL). He played college football for the SMU Mustangs, and was selected by the Chicago Bears in the third round of the 1960 NFL draft, which took place in November 1959. This draft occurred before the Dallas Cowboys were officially established in January 1960. The Cowboys later acquired Meredith's rights through a trade, allowing them to sign him. He was the second starting quarterback of the Dallas Cowboys, following Eddie LeBaron, and is the first major franchise quarterback in Cowboys history. Under the mentorship of head coach Tom Landry, Meredith led the Cowboys to three straight postseason appearances from the 1966 to 1968 seasons, including back-to-back NFL Championship Game appearances in the 1966 and 1967 seasons. He was selected a second-team All-Pro in 1966 and made three straight Pro Bowls from 1966 to 1968.

Meredith was named to the Pro Bowl in each of his last three years as a player. He subsequently became a color analyst for NFL telecasts from 1970 to 1984. As an original member of the Monday Night Football broadcast team, alongside Howard Cosell. Meredith was also an actor who appeared in a dozen films and seven major television shows, some of which had him as a starring actor. He is familiar to television audiences as Bert Jameson, a recurring role he had in Police Story.

== Early life ==
Meredith was born on April 10, 1938, in Mount Vernon, Texas, located about 100 miles east of Dallas. He attended Mount Vernon High School in his hometown, where he starred in football and basketball, performed in school plays, and graduated second in his class.

== College career ==
Although he was heavily recruited by Texas A&M head coach Bear Bryant, Meredith played college football at Southern Methodist University (SMU) in Dallas. His reasoning, likely intended to be more humorous than real, was due to its being closer to home, and the acronym being easier to spell. He led the Southwest Conference (SWC) in passing completion percentage in each of his three years as the starting quarterback (1957–59), and was an All-America selection in 1958 and 1959. His fellow students jokingly referred to the school as "Southern Meredith University" due to his popularity on campus. He completed 8 of 20 passes for 156 yards in the College All-Stars' 32–7 loss to the defending NFL champion Baltimore Colts in Soldier Field in Chicago on August 12, 1960.

Meredith was honored twice by SMU in later decades; he was the recipient of the university's Distinguished Alumni Award in 1983, and his jersey number 17 was retired during halftime ceremonies at the SMU–Houston game on October 18, 2008. He was also inducted into the College Football Hall of Fame in 1982.

== Professional career ==
The Dallas Cowboys franchise was admitted to the league too late to participate in the 1960 NFL draft, so on November 28, 1959, two days before the draft, Meredith signed a five-year personal-services contract with Tecon Corporation, which like the Cowboys, was owned by Clint Murchison. He planned to attend law school before the deal. This contract meant he would play for the Cowboys if and when they received an NFL franchise. He was also selected by the Chicago Bears in the third round (32nd overall) of the 1960 NFL draft, after Bears owner George Halas made the pick to help ensure that the expansion Cowboys got off to a solid start. The league honored the contract, but made the Cowboys compensate the Bears with a third-round pick in the 1962 NFL draft. He is considered by some to be the original Dallas Cowboy because he was a part of the team before the franchise adopted a nickname, hired a head coach, (Tom Landry) a scout (Gil Brandt), or participated in either the 1960 NFL expansion draft or its first NFL draft in 1961. The Texans, their crosstown rivals in the American Football League, also chose him as a "territorial selection" in their 1960 draft, but were too late to sign him.

Meredith spent two years as a backup to Eddie LeBaron, eventually splitting time in 1962 before he was given the full-time starting job by Coach Landry in 1963. When statistics for sacks were counted retroactively for his era, Meredith became the first quarterback to have been sacked more than 50 times, having been sacked 58 times in the 1964 season. The team went 5-4-1 with Meredith as starter. The following year, they did even better, as he went 7–4 in games while throwing 22 touchdowns to 13 interceptions. In 1966, Meredith led the Cowboys to the NFL postseason, something he continued to do until his unexpected retirement before the 1969 season. His two most heartbreaking defeats came in NFL Championship play against the Green Bay Packers, 34–27 in Dallas (1966), during which he was intercepted on a fourth-down passing play, an interception that he later claimed was due to a coaching issue, having incorrect personnel and formation on the field; and the famous "Ice Bowl" game, 21–17 in Green Bay (1967). Already feeling physically and mentally fatigued as a leader, he had his worst playoff outing in 1968 against the Cleveland Browns in the Eastern Conference Championship game, throwing three interceptions before being benched, which led to his retirement in 1969 at age 31. His successor Craig Morton also struggled to win a championship until Roger Staubach ultimately proved to be the missing ingredient needed to finally help the 1971 Cowboys win their first Super Bowl.

Meredith was always exceptionally popular with Cowboys fans, who remember him for his grit and toughness, his outgoing nature, and his leadership during the first winning seasons for the Cowboys. During his career, he had a 50.7% completion rate, throwing for 17,199 yards and 135 touchdowns with a lifetime passer rating of 74.8. He was named the NFL Player of the Year in 1966 and was named to the Pro Bowl three times. According to the NFL, the longest pass with no yards after catch was his 83-yard pass to Bob Hayes. However, the NFL does not keep statistics on the distance of actual passes.

== NFL career statistics ==
Year	Team	GP	GS	Passing								Rushing			
Year	Team	GP	GS	Cmp	Att	Pct	Yds	Y/A	TD	Int	Rtg	Att	Yds	Avg	TD
1960	DAL	6	1	29	68	42.6	281	4.1	2	5	34.0	3	4	1.3	0
1961	DAL	8	4	94	182	51.6	1,161	6.4	9	11	63.0	22	176	8.0	1
1962	DAL	13	8	105	212	49.5	1,679	7.9	15	8	84.2	21	74	3.5	0
1963	DAL	14	12	167	310	53.9	2,381	7.7	17	18	73.1	41	185	4.5	3
1964	DAL	12	10	158	323	48.9	2,143	6.6	9	16	59.1	32	81	2.5	4
1965	DAL	14	11	141	305	46.2	2,415	7.9	22	13	79.9	35	247	7.1	1
1966	DAL	13	13	177	344	51.5	2,805	8.2	24	12	87.7	38	242	6.4	5
1967	DAL	11	11	128	255	50.2	1,834	7.2	16	16	68.7	28	84	3.0	0
1968	DAL	13	13	171	309	55.3	2,500	8.1	21	12	88.4	22	123	5.6	1
Career		104	83	1,170	2,308	50.7	17,199	7.5	135	111	74.8	242	1,216	5.0	15

== Post-football career ==
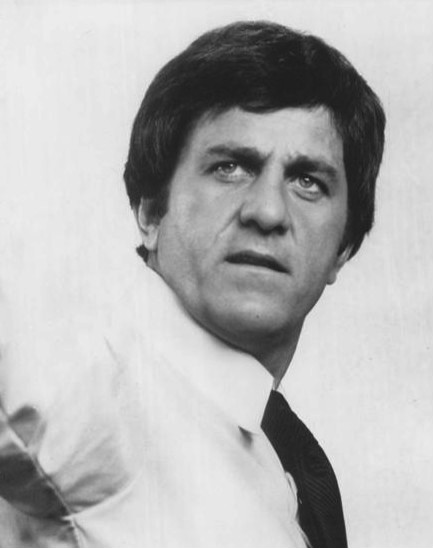
Meredith as Bert Jameson on Police Story, 1976

Following his football career, Meredith helped market Docutel automated teller machines; his brother B.J. was president of the Dallas-area company. Meredith became a color commentator for Monday Night Football beginning in 1970. He left for three seasons (1974–1976) to work with Curt Gowdy at NFL on NBC, then returned to MNF partners Frank Gifford and Howard Cosell. His approach to color commentary was light-hearted and folksy in contrast to Cosell's scholarly, professorial observations and Gifford's straightforward, technical play-by-play analyses. He was known for singing "Turn out the lights, the party's over" (a line from a Willie Nelson song "The Party's Over") at garbage time.

Meredith's broadcasting career was also not without a few incidents of minor controversy, including referring to then-President Richard Nixon as "Tricky Dick", announcing that he was "mile-high" before a game in Denver, and turning the name of Cleveland Browns receiver Fair Hooker into a double entendre (saying "Fair Hooker...well, I haven't met one yet!"). He retired from sportscasting after the 1984 season, a year after Cosell's retirement. His final broadcast was Super Bowl XIX with Frank Gifford and Joe Theismann, which was the first Super Bowl broadcast by ABC. He moved to Santa Fe, New Mexico, where he lived in seclusion as a painter until his death.

In 1976, Meredith was inducted into the Dallas Cowboys Ring of Honor at Texas Stadium with former running back Don Perkins.

The novel North Dallas Forty, written by former Dallas Cowboy wide receiver and Meredith teammate Peter Gent, is a fictional account of life in the NFL during the 1960s, featuring quarterback Seth Maxwell, a character widely believed to be based on Meredith, and receiver Phil Elliot, believed to be based on Gent. Maxwell and Elliot are characterized as boozing, womanizing, aging stars in the twilight of their careers, held together by pills and alcohol. Of the story, Meredith said, "If I'd known Gent was as good as he says he was, I would have thrown to him more."

Meredith was selected as the 2007 recipient of the Pro Football Hall of Fame's Pete Rozelle Radio-Television Award. He received the award at the Enshrinee's Dinner on August 3, 2007.

== Acting career ==
Meredith also had an acting career, appearing in multiple movies and television shows. From the mid-1970s through the early '80s, he was in a series of commercials for Lipton Tea. He voiced himself in an episode of King of the Hill ("A Beer Can Named Desire"), in which he misses a throw that would have won the main character, Hank Hill, $100,000. He was also part of an ensemble cast in his son Michael Meredith's Three Days of Rain with Blythe Danner, Peter Falk, and Jason Patric.

One of his early film roles was as Kelly Freeman in the 1974 film Terror on the 40th Floor, which starred John Forsythe, Joseph Campanella, and Lynn Carlin.

One of his recurring starring roles was as Detective Bert Jameson in Police Story. Tony Lo Bianco also had an ongoing role as Det. Calabrese in the same lot of episodes as Meredith. They also appeared as their characters separately in later episodes. One episode, "The Witness", features a picture of Meredith in his Dallas uniform hanging on a wall in Delaney's bar, while Bert interviews witnesses to a robbery below his picture.

== Family ==
Meredith was married three times. His first wife was former SMU cheerleader Lynne Shamburger; they were married from 1959 to 1963 and had one daughter, Mary. From 1965 to 1971, he was married to the former Cheryl King, with whom he had son Michael and daughter Heather. He met his third wife, the former Susan Lessons Dullea (ex-wife of actor Keir Dullea), as they were both walking on Third Avenue in New York City. They married in 1972.

== Death ==
Meredith died on December 5, 2010, at St. Vincent Regional Medical Center in Santa Fe, New Mexico, after suffering a brain hemorrhage. He was 72 years old. He was laid to rest in his hometown of Mount Vernon, Texas.

== Filmography ==
Television shows
Title	Episode	Role	Director	Year	Notes #
Police Story	"Requiem for an Informer "	Officer Bert Jameson	Marvin Chomsky	1973	aired October 9, 1973
Police Story	"The Hunters"	Bert Jameson	Richard Benedict	1974	aired February 26, 1974
Police Story	"Glamour Boy"	Det. Sgt. Bert Jameson	Virgil W. Vogel	1974	aired October 29, 1974
Police Story	"Explosion"	Bert Jameson	Alex March	1974	aired December 3, 1974
Police Story	"The Witness"	Detective Bert Jameson	Edward Abroms	1975	aired March 11, 1975
Police Woman	"The Loner"	'Turk' Allison	John Newland	1975	aired March 14, 1975
McCloud	"Showdown at Times Square"	Linus Morton	Ron Satlof	1975	aired October 19, 1975
Police Story	"Face for a Shadow "	John Kowalski	Alex March	1975	aired November 7, 1975
The Quest	"Shanklin"	Shanklin	Corey Allen	1976	aired October 13, 1976
Police Story	"The Jar: Part 1"	Sgt. Ed Hagen	Michael O'Herlihy	1976	aired December 14, 1976
Police Story	"The Jar: Part 2"	Ed Hagen	Michael O'Herlihy	1976	aired December 21, 1976
Supertrain	"Express to Terror"	Rick Prince	Dan Curtis	1979	aired February 7, 1979
Midnight Caller	"Sale Away: Part 2"	Foster Castleman	Rob Bowman	1990	aired October 26, 1990
Evening Shade	"No Pain, No Gain"	Billy Clyde Crawford	Burt Reynolds	1992	aired May 18, 1992
King of the Hill	"A Beer Can Named Desire"	Himself	Chris Moeller and Chuck Austen	1999	aired November 19, 1999

Film
Title	Role	Director	Year	Notes #
Terror on the 40th Floor	Kelly Freeman	Jerry Jameson	1974	TV movie
Sky Heist	Sergeant Doug Trumbell	Lee H. Katzin	1975	Main role TV movie
Banjo Hackett: Roamin’ Free	Banjo Hackett	Andrew V. McLaglen	1976	Main role TV movie
Mayday at 40,000 Feet!	Mike Fuller	Robert Butler	1976	Co-star; TV movie
Kate Bliss and the Ticker Tape Kid	Clint Allison	Burt Kennedy	1978	Co-star; TV movie
The Courage and the Passion	Col. Jim Gardner	John Llewellyn Moxey	1978	TV movie
Undercover with the KKK	Gary Thomas Rowe Jr.	Barry Shear	1979	Main role TV movie
The Night the City Screamed	Captain Donald Wiacek	Harry Falk	1980	TV movie
Terror Among Us	Sgt. Tom Stockwell	Paul Krasny	1981	Main role TV movie
Police Story: The Freeway Killings	Detective Foley	William A. Graham	1987	TV movie
Wyatt Earp: Return to Tombstone	Clay the Bartender	Paul Landres; Frank McDonald	1994	TV movie
Three Days of Rain	John Horton	Michael Meredith	2002	

== See also ==
- Most consecutive games with at least two touchdown passes

Preceded by Al DeRogatis	NFL on NBC lead analyst 1974–1976	Succeeded by John Brodie
Preceded by Al DeRogatis	Super Bowl television color commentator (AFC package carrier); 1974-1976	Succeeded by John Brodie and Merlin Olsen
Preceded by First	Monday Night Football color commentator 1970–1973; 1977–1984 (with Howard Cosell from 1970–1973, 1977–1983 and O. J. Simpson in 1984)	Succeeded by Alex Karras; Joe Namath
Preceded by First	Super Bowl television color commentator (non-cable prime-time package carrier); 1984 (with Joe Theismann)	Succeeded by Frank Gifford and Dan Dierdorf
