= Looking for Richard =

1996 film

- Theatrical release poster
- Directed by: Al Pacino
- Written by: William Shakespeare; Al Pacino; Frederic Kimball
- Produced by: Michael Hadge; Al Pacino
- Starring: Penelope Allen; Alec Baldwin; Kevin Conway; Al Pacino; Estelle Parsons; Aidan Quinn; Winona Ryder; Kevin Spacey; Harris Yulin
- Cinematography: Robert Leacock
- Edited by: William A. Anderson; Ned Bastille; Pasquale Buba; Andre Ross Betz
- Music by: Howard Shore
- Production companies: Chal Productions; Jam Productions
- Distributed by: Fox Searchlight Pictures
- Release date: October 11, 1996 (United States)
- Running time: 112 minutes
- Country: United States
- Language: English
- Box office: $1,408,575

Looking for Richard is a 1996 American documentary film directed by Al Pacino, in his directorial debut. It is a hybrid film, including both a filmed performance of selected scenes of William Shakespeare's Richard III and a documentary element which explores a broader examination of Shakespeare's continuing role and relevance in popular culture. The film was featured at the Sundance Film Festival in January 1996 and it was screened in the Un Certain Regard section at the 1996 Cannes Film Festival. Al Pacino won the Directors Guild of America Award for Outstanding Directing – Documentaries.

== Description ==
Pacino plays both himself and the title character, Richard III. The film guides the audience through the play's plot and historical background. Pacino and several fellow actors, including Penelope Allen and Harris Yulin, act out scenes from the play.

In addition, the actors comment on their roles. Pacino also features other actors famous for performing Shakespeare, such as Vanessa Redgrave, Kenneth Branagh, John Gielgud, Derek Jacobi, James Earl Jones, and Kevin Kline. Pacino includes interviews with Shakespeare scholars such as Barbara Everett, as well as ordinary people on the street.

== Cast ==
- Al Pacino as Richard III
- Penelope Allen as Queen Elizabeth
- Harris Yulin as King Edward
- Kevin Spacey as Buckingham
- Winona Ryder as Lady Anne
- Madison Arnold as Rivers
- Vincent Angell as Grey
- Gordon MacDonald as Dorset
- Kevin Conway as Lord Hastings
- Julie Moret as Mistress Shore
- Estelle Parsons as Queen Margaret
- Alec Baldwin as Clarence
- Aidan Quinn as Richmond
- Bruce MacVittie as 1st Murderer
- Paul Guilfoyle as 2nd Murderer

== Reception ==
The film received positive reviews from critics. On the review aggregator website Rotten Tomatoes, 82% of 49 critics' reviews are positive, with an average rating of 7.1/10. The website's consensus reads: "Looking for Richard is a smart, fascinating behind-the-scenes look at adapting Shakespeare."
