= Bob Finley =

American baseball player (1915–1986)

- Catcher
- Born: November 25, 1915; Ennis, Texas, U.S.
- Died: January 2, 1986 (aged 70); West Covina, California, U.S.
- Batted: Right Threw: Right

MLB debut
- July 4, 1943, for the Philadelphia Phillies

Last MLB appearance
- October 1, 1944, for the Philadelphia Phillies

MLB statistics
- Batting average: .251
- Home runs: 2
- Runs batted in: 28
- Stats at Baseball Reference

Teams
- Philadelphia Phillies (1943–1944)

Robert Edward Finley (November 25, 1915 – January 2, 1986) was an American professional baseball catcher, who was an SMU back drafted by the Pittsburgh Steelers. He played in Major League Baseball (MLB) for the Philadelphia Phillies in 1943 and 1944. Finley was a native of Ennis, Texas. He and Charlie Hudson are the only two Ennis natives to appear in Major League Baseball.

Finley played both baseball and football at Southern Methodist University from which he graduated in 1937. He was a member of the SMU 1935 national champions and 1936 Rose Bowl team. At SMU, Finley is most famous for his play on November 30, 1935, in which No. 1 SMU played No. 2 TCU and Sammy Baugh in Ft. Worth. SMU scored the first 14 points of the game. But TCU came back and with the Horned Frogs leading late, 14–13, the Mustangs had fourth-and-four at the TCU 37. Out of punt formation, Finley threw a 37-yard touchdown to Bobby Wilson. SMU won, 20–14, and went to the Rose Bowl.

Finley was the varsity baseball coach at SMU from 1965 to 1976.

Finley was also a football official who worked in the Southwest Conference. He officiated professional football as an umpire and as a referee, one of nine on-field officials to serve in the American Football League (AFL) for its entire ten-year existence, 1960 through 1969. He also was a referee in the National Football League in 1970, the first season following the AFL–NFL merger. Finley retired following the 1970 season; his last game was a Pittsburgh Steelers–Philadelphia Eagles matchup at Franklin Field December 20. The Eagles won 30-20 in Franklin Field's NFL finale; they moved to Veterans Stadium in 1971.

Finley's 1970 crew included umpire Lou Palazzi, head linesman Cal Lepore, line judge Art Holst, back judge Grover Klemmer, and field judge Bob Wortman.

Finley wore uniform number 14 in 1970, which was claimed by line judge and future referee Gene Barth in 1971. The number was later worn by referees Ron Winter and Shawn Smith.

Bob Frederic, a back judge on the crew of Jack Vest in 1970, was promoted to referee in 1971 to succeed Finley as crew chief. The other five members of Finley's 1970 crew remained with Frederic through the 1973 season, prior to Lepore's promotion to referee for 1974.

Finley was drafted in the second round (15th overall pick) by the Pittsburgh Pirates in the 1937 NFL draft. However, he signed to play professional baseball with the Boston Red Sox in 1937 and spent six seasons in the Red Sox organization. Finley is one of many ballplayers who only appeared in the major leagues during World War II. His major league debut came with the Phillies, in a 4th of July doubleheader against the Chicago Cubs at Shibe Park. During Finley's two seasons in the big leagues he appeared in 122 games — 98 as a catcher. Finley batted .251 (91-for-362) with 2 home runs, 28 runs batted in (RBI), and 27 runs scored. In 1944 he ranked fifth in the National League in the hit by pitch category with 5.

On January 2, 1986, Finley died at the age of 70 in West Covina, California.

== See also ==
- List of American Football League officials
