= List of sports officials who died while active =

This is a list of sports officials who died while active. This list is organized alphabetically by the sport the individual officiated in, and notes the deaths in chronological order within each sport. Also noted are age, leagues/associations or events they were part of when they died, officiating position (if applicable), cause of death, and date of death. Some deaths occurred due to an in-game injury or medical emergency, but most were the result of injuries and illnesses sustained elsewhere. There are also deaths that occurred due to violence directed towards officials. Abuse of officials, whether it be physical violence or verbal threats, has been of increasing concern in many sports.

Although this list primarily consists of professional sports officials, amateur sports officials may be included if their deaths are related to games they worked, or were scheduled to do so. Officials who worked in notable high level amateur sports (such as NCAA Division I college sports and Major Junior ice hockey), and officials who worked world championship or Olympic/Paralympic events shortly before their deaths are treated as professional. This list does not include officiating supervisors or officials who retired shortly before their deaths, unless they were working a game at the time.

== Association football ==
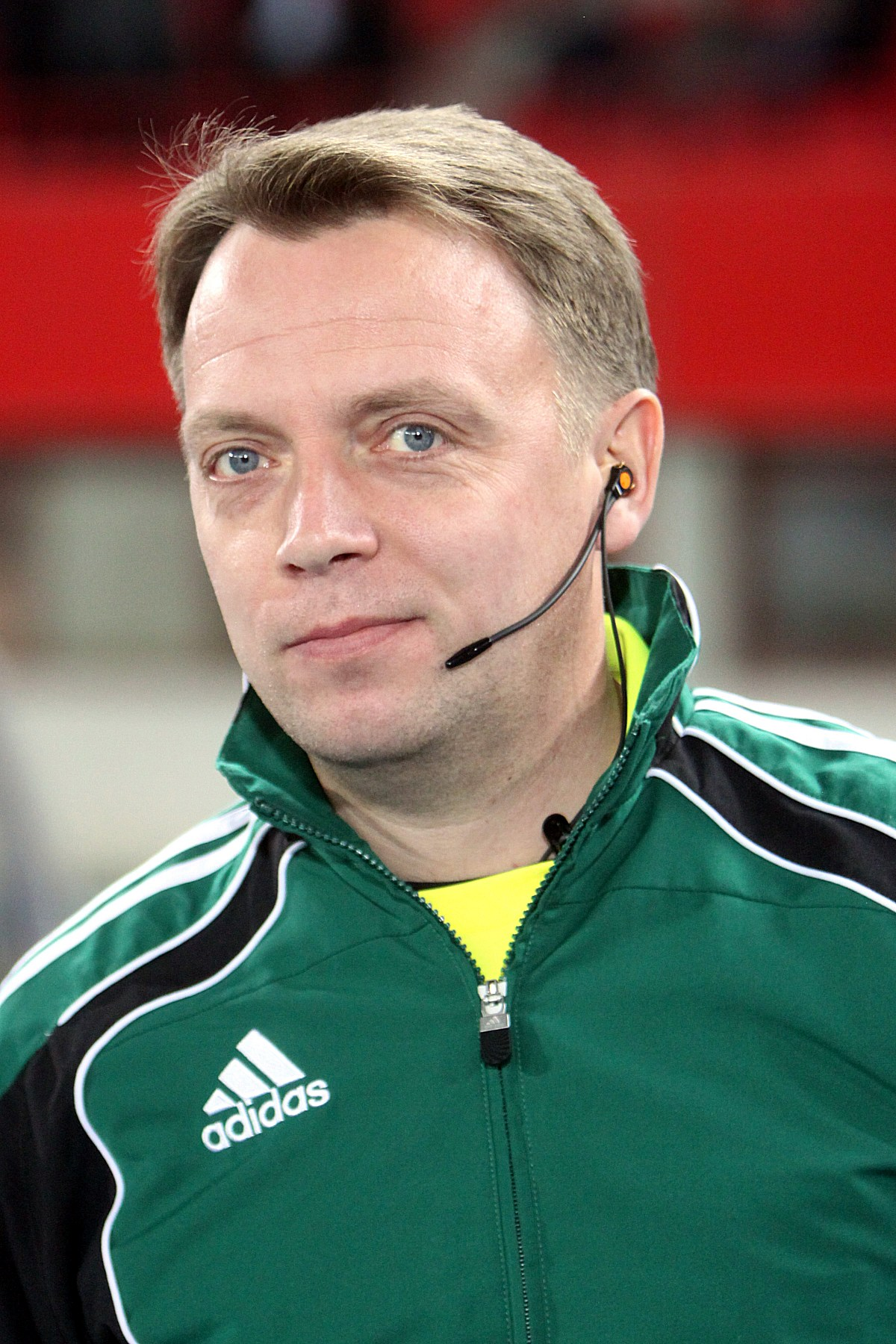
RPL referee Vladimir Pettay died in the 2011 crash of RusAir Flight 9605

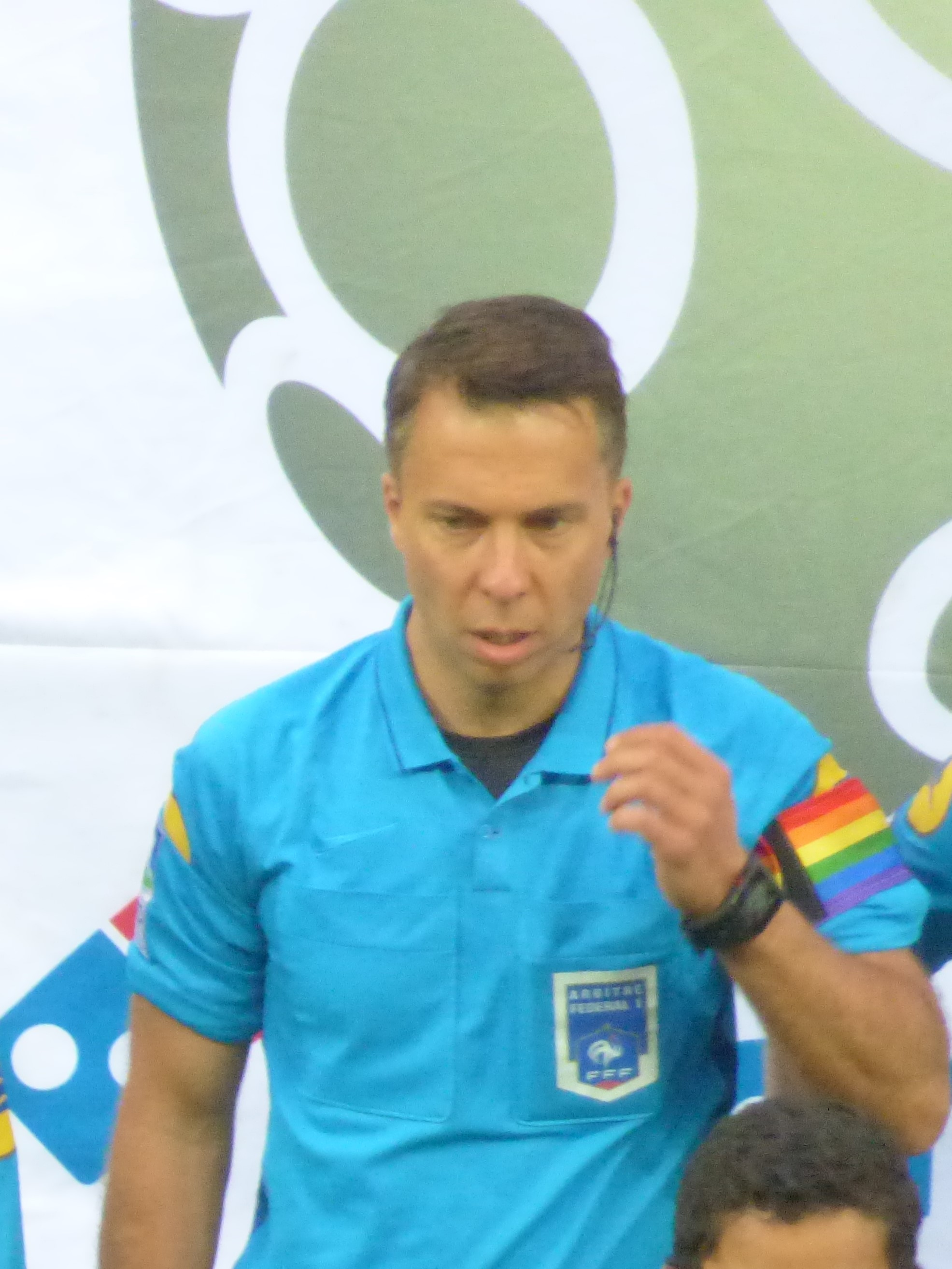
Ligue 1 referee Johan Hamel died of a stroke in 2022

The following are association football/soccer referees who died during their careers or officiating assignments.

Name	Age	League	Cause of death	Date of death	Ref(s)
Vladimir Pettay	38	Russian Premier League	plane crash	June 20, 2011	
Richard Nieuwenhuizen	41	Royal Dutch Football Association	assaulted by players	December 2, 2012	
Ricardo Portillo	46	Liga Continental de Futbol (amateur, Salt Lake City, United States)	assault by player	May 4, 2013	
Otávio da Silva	20	unknown league in Pio XII, Brazil (amateur)	decapitated by spectators	June 30, 2013	
John Bieniewicz	44	recreational league in Detroit, United States	assault by player	July 1, 2014	
Edwin Quintero	49	unknown league in Toronto, Canada	shot during game	October 9, 2022	
Johan Hamel (simple)	42	Ligue 1	stroke	November 15, 2022	
Max Molelekoa	31	Premier Soccer League	car accident	January 21, 2023	
Akho Ndzingo	30	Premier Soccer League	gunshot wounds	June 12, 2024	
Wilverglen Lamey	48	Jamaica Football Federation	in-game collapse	September 21, 2024	
Peter Kabugo	27	Uganda Premier League	in-game cardiac arrest due to asthma attack	November 1, 2024	

== Athletics ==
=== Track and field ===
The following are track and field officials who died during their careers or officiating assignments.

Name	Age	Event	Association	Cause of death	Date of death	Ref(s)
Maree Rodebaugh	56	shot put	Amateur Athletic Union (Note: Rodebaugh was fatally struck during the 1977 USA Outdoor Track and Field Championships.)	internal bleeding after being struck in back during meet	May 29, 1977	
Paul Suzuki	77	shot put	USA Track & Field (Note: Suzuki was fatally struck during the 2005 USA Outdoor Track and Field Championships.)	brain injury during pre-meet practice	June 22, 2005	
Dieter Strack	74	javelin throw	Düsseldorf Athletics (DLV)	impaled during meet	August 26, 2012	
Douglas Koban	75	hammer throw	USA Track & Field Niagara	brain injury during meet	December 7, 2014	
Ethan Roser	19	hammer throw	College Conference of Illinois and Wisconsin (Note: Roser was fatally struck while assisting officials as a volunteer.)	brain injury during meet	April 22, 2017	

== Australian rules football ==
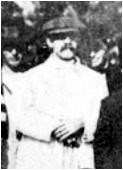
VFL umpire Alexander Salton was a casualty of World War I, and is the only VFL/AFL umpire to die in military service

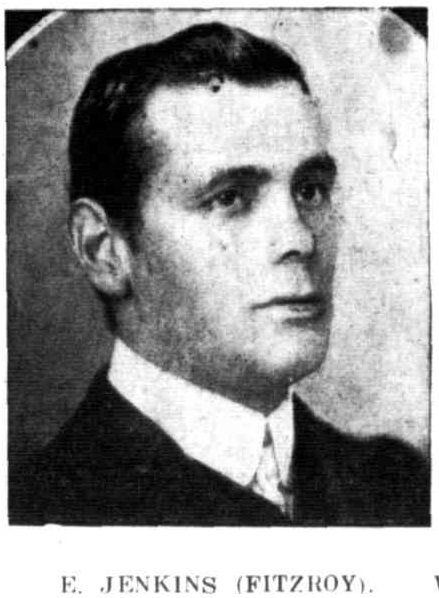
VFL umpire Ern Jenkins died less than three months after the conclusion of the 1927 season

The following are Australian football umpires who died during their careers or officiating assignments.

Name	Age	Position	League	Cause of death	Date of death	Ref(s)
Alexander Salton	47	goal umpire	Victorian Football League	killed in action during WWI	September 10, 1916	
Ern Jenkins	48	goal umpire	Victorian Football League	unknown	December 21, 1927	
Teddy Shorten	51	goal umpire	Victorian Football League	unknown	July 9, 1949	
Greg Sidebottom	61	field umpire	Kyabram District Football League (Note: Sidebottom was an umpire in the VFL from 1976 to 1987.)	in-game heart attack	April 2, 2016	
Jesse Baird	26	goal umpire	Australian Football League	murdered	February 19, 2024	

== Baseball ==
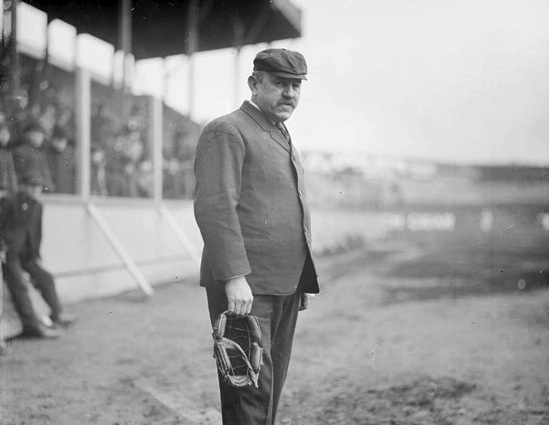
AL umpire (and Honor Rolls of Baseball inductee) Jack Sheridan died of a heart attack in 1914

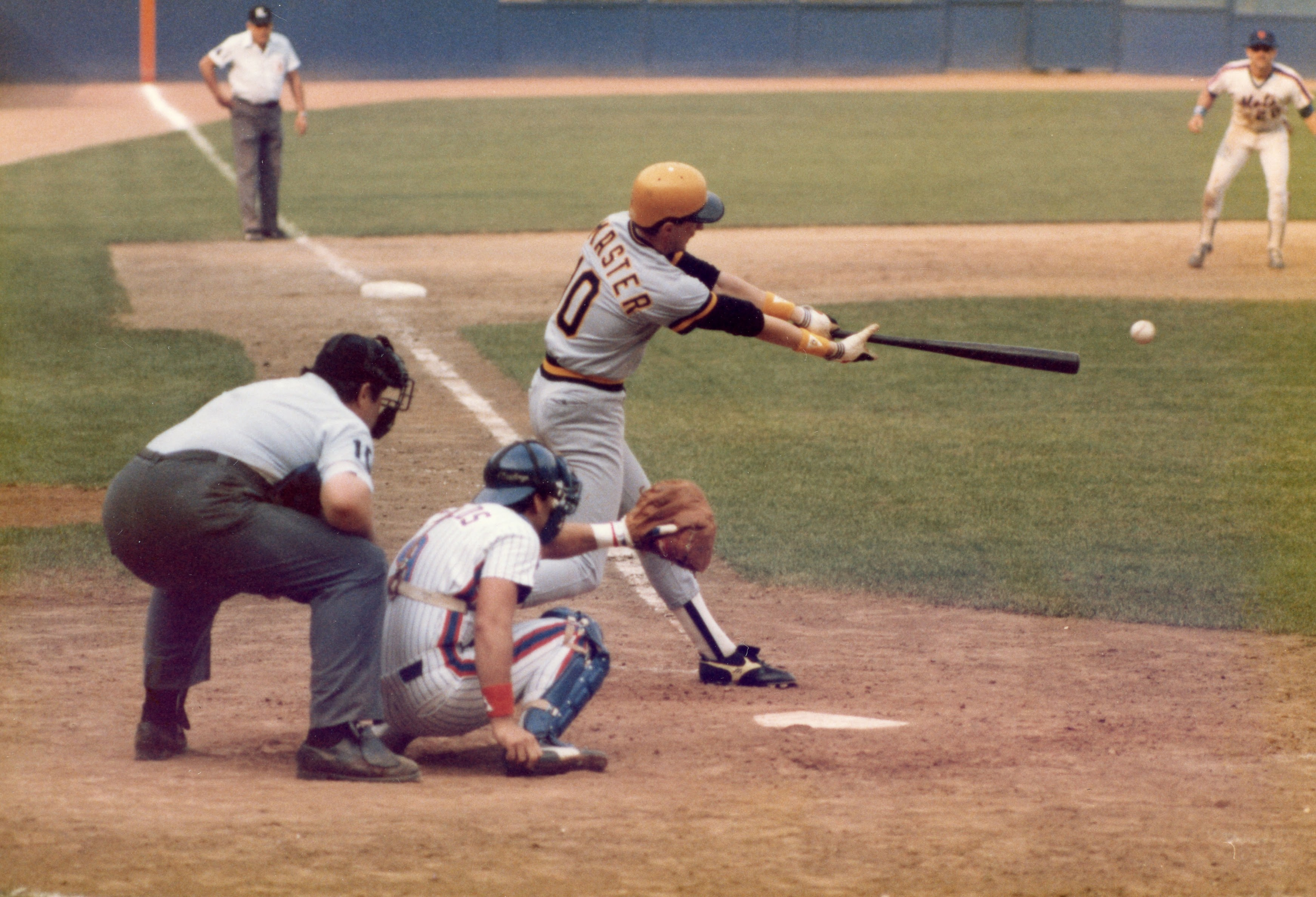
NL umpire John McSherry (pictured umpiring a 1985 game) died after collapsing during the Cincinnati Reds 1996 home opener

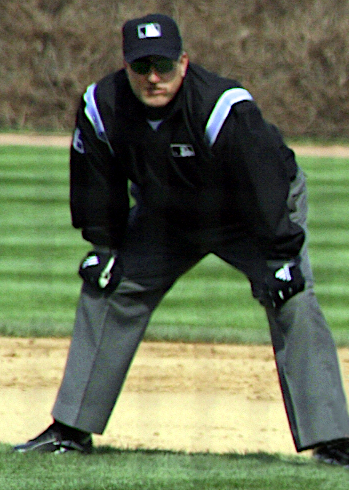
MLB umpire Eric Cooper died of surgery complications two weeks after working a 2019 postseason game

The following are baseball umpires who died during their careers or officiating assignments.

Name	Age	League	Cause of death	Date of death	Ref(s)
Jack McQuaid	35–36	National League	unknown	April 16, 1895	
Jack Sheridan	52	American League	heart attack	November 2, 1914	
Steve Kane	45	Ohio State League (Note: Kane previously umpired in the National League and Federal League.)	heart attack	October 30, 1915	
Silk O'Loughlin	42	American League	influenza	December 20, 1918	
Pete Harrison	36	National League	tuberculosis	March 10, 1921	
Paul Sentell	43	National League	collapsed during pre-game warmup from appendicitis	April 27, 1923	
Frank Wilson	38	National League	appendicitis	June 12, 1928	
Sherry Magee	44	National League	pneumonia	March 13, 1929	
Cy Pfirman	48	National League	kidney disease	May 16, 1937	
Lou Kolls	48	American Association (Note: Kolls previously umpired in the AL.)	car accident	February 23, 1941	
Cal Drummond	52	American Association (Note: Drummond umpired in the AL from 1960 to 1969, where he suffered a serious head injury that led to his death.)	in-game stroke	May 3, 1970	
Tony Venzon	56	National League	complications of open heart surgery	September 20, 1971	
Lou DiMuro	51	American League	post-game car accident	June 7, 1982	
Bill Kunkel	48	American League	colon cancer	May 4, 1985	
Dick Stello	53	National League	car accident	November 18, 1987	
Lee Weyer	51	National League	post-game heart attack	July 4, 1988	
Nick Bremigan	43	American League	heart attack	March 28, 1989	
John McSherry	51	National League	in-game heart attack	April 1, 1996	
Wally Bell	48	Major League Baseball	heart attack	October 14, 2013	
Eric Cooper	52	Major League Baseball	blood clot following knee surgery	October 20, 2019	
David Simon	51	Frontier League (Note: Simon was also umpiring college baseball at the time of his death.)	cardiac arrest	December 5, 2022	
Conor McKenzie	29	Northwoods League	car accident while travelling to game	July 9, 2023	
Marty Bauer	55	Atlantic League	unknown	October 4, 2024	

=== Softball ===
The following are softball umpires who died during their careers or officiating assignments.

Name	Age	League	Cause of death	Date of death	Ref(s)
Ricky Scearce Jr	60	University Interscholastic League	in-game heart attack	May 4, 2012	
Jeff Reynolds	65	Massachusetts Interscholastic Athletic Association	in-game heart attack	May 25, 2016	
Rick Rogers	61	Softball Ontario	collapsed during tournament	July 21, 2024	

== Basketball ==
The following are basketball referees that died during their careers or officiating assignments.

Name	Age	League	Cause of death	Date of death	Ref(s)
Troy Raymond	46	Sun Belt Conference, Southland Conference (Note: Raymond was a referee for the 2003-04 NBA season.)	suicide	August 12, 2011	
Greg Willard	54	National Basketball Association	pancreatic cancer	April 1, 2013	
Tony Brown	55	National Basketball Association	pancreatic cancer	October 20, 2022	
Don McGillicuddy	56	Massachusetts Interscholastic Athletic Association	in-game cardiac arrest	March 1, 2024	

== Boxing ==
The following are boxing referees who died during their careers or officiating assignments.

Name	Age	Final match	Cause of death	Date of death	Ref(s)
Richard Green	46	Page def. Snipes (May 20, 1983, USBA)	suicide	September 15, 1983	
Mitch Halpern	33	Mendoza def. Álvarez (August 12, 2000, WBA)	suicide	August 20, 2000	

== Cricket ==
The following are cricket umpires who died during their careers or officiating assignments.

Name	Age	League	Cause of death	Date of death	Ref(s)
Alcwyn Jenkins	72	South Wales Cricket Association	in-game brain injury	July 4, 2009	
Hillel Awaskar	55	Israel Cricket Association	in-game neck injury	November 30, 2014	
John Williams	80	Pembroke County Cricket League	in-game brain injury	August 15, 2019	
Sumit Bansal	46	Delhi & District Cricket Association	cardiac arrest shortly after recovering from in-game injury	October 10, 2021	

== Gridiron football ==
The following are gridiron football officials (including Canadian rules officials and those of other football variations) who died during their careers or officiating assignments.

Name	Age	Position	League	Cause of death	Date of death	Ref(s)
James Barnhill	45	referee	American Football League	heart attack	March 11, 1966	
George Young	45	umpire	American Football League	brain tumor	September 21, 1969	
Jack Vest	45	referee	National Football League	motorcycle crash	June 2, 1972	
Harry Kessel	47	head linesman	National Football League	unknown	October 9, 1972	
George Ellis	53	field judge	National Football League	unknown illness	July 31, 1974	
Vince Jacob	51	side judge	National Football League	heart attack	October 26, 1982	
Dick Jorgensen	56	referee	National Football League	complications of a blood disorder	October 10, 1990	
Dave Hamilton	61	umpire	National Football League	liver failure	January 9, 1995	
Donnie Hampton	47	field judge	National Football League	heart attack	January 30, 1995	
Bob Lawing	58	back judge	National Football League	cancer	May 6, 2010	
Carl Madsen	71	replay official	National Football League	cardiac arrest while driving home from game	October 24, 2021	

== Ice hockey ==
The following are ice hockey officials who died during their careers or officiating assignments.

Name	Age	Position	League	Cause of death	Date of death	Ref(s)
Stéphane Provost	37	linesman	National Hockey League	motorcycle crash	April 22, 2005	
Roland Hedberg	62	referee	Swedish Ice Hockey Association	in-game brain injury	January 30, 2010	
Butch Mousseau	48	referee	Western Collegiate Hockey Association	brain injury during pre-game warmup	March 25, 2016	
Pavel Lainka (cs)	24	referee	WSM Liga (Note: Lainka was refereeing a junior hockey game when he was mortally injured.)	in-game brain injury	September 10, 2016	
Rafael Kadyrov	47	referee	Kontinental Hockey League	brain cancer	January 20, 2017	

== Motorsport ==
The following are officials including motorsport marshals who died during their careers or officiating assignments.

Name	Age	Position	Series	Event	Cause of death	Date of death	Ref(s)
Ange Baldoni	52	Race Marshal	Formula One	1962 Monaco Grand Prix	Struck by a flying wheel after a multi-car accident at the Gasworks hairpin	June 12, 1962	
Günther Schneider	19	German Red Cross Worker	Formula One	1963 German Grand Prix	Struck by an errant wheel from Willy Mairesse's Ferrari	August 4, 1963	
Frederik Jansen van Vuuren	19	Track Marshal	Formula One	1977 South African Grand Prix	Struck full-speed by Tom Pryce over a blind crest as he was running across the track to attend to the stalled car of Renzo Zorzi. Pryce was following another driver who narrowly missed Jansen van Vuuren and another marshal. Jansen van Vuuren's hand-held fire extinguisher struck Pryce's head, also killing the driver instantly.	March 5, 1977	
Jean-Patrick Hein	Unknown	Turn Worker	CART	1990 Molson Indy Vancouver	Run over by left-rear wheel of Willy T. Ribbs's car after push-starting another car around a blind corner	September 2, 1990	
Gary Avrin	44	Track Official	CART	1996 Molson Indy Toronto	Struck by wheel of Jeff Krosnoff's car as it penetrated the catch fencing, striking a tree and light pole, killing Krosnoff as well	July 14, 1996	
Elmo Langley	68	Safety Car driver	NASCAR Winston Cup Series	1996 NASCAR Thunder 100	Massive heart attack during safety car runs 2 days prior to race day	November 21, 1996	
Paolo Gislimberti	33	Fire Marshal	Formula One	2000 Italian Grand Prix	Struck in head and chest by disconnected wheel and tire during Lap 1 accident	September 10, 2000	
Graham Beveridge	51	Track Marshal	Formula One	2001 Australian Grand Prix	Struck in chest by disconnected wheel and tire after being instructed to stand close to the fencing for crowd control purposes	March 4, 2001	
Mark Robinson	38	Track Marshal	Formula One	2013 Canadian Grand Prix	Run over by a tractor crane taking a stalled car off the track. Robinson dropped a radio while guiding the crane and stumbled picking it up, being crushed under the crane's wheel.	June 9, 2013	

== Rugby football ==
=== Rugby league ===
The following are rugby league match officials/referees who died during their careers or officiating assignments.

Name	Age	League	Cause of death	Date of death	Ref(s)
Ted Hooper	54	New South Wales Rugby Football League (Note: Hooper had retired in 1915, and was working as the NSWRFL’s referee assignor when he died after officiating an exhibition match in 1925.)	collapsed after match	August 22, 1925	
Chris Leatherbarrow	27	Super League	suicide	November 1, 2015	

=== Rugby union ===
The following are rugby union match officials/referees who died during their careers or officiating assignments.

Name	Age	League	Cause of death	Date of death	Ref(s)
Kerry Fitzgerald	43	Queensland Rugby Union (Note: Fitzgerald refereed the 1987 Rugby World Cup final and his final match was during the 1991 Rugby World Cup.)	heart attack	December 18, 1991	
Ian Rogers	41	South African Rugby Football Union (Note: Rogers refereed the 1995 Rugby World Cup, and was assigned to 1999 Rugby World Cup qualifying but had fallen ill.)	cancer	November 26, 1998	
Ian Hooper	60	Far North Coast Rugby Union	in-match heart attack	April 28, 2019	

== Tennis ==
The following are tennis umpires who died during their careers or officiating assignments.

Name	Age	Position	Final tournament	Cause of death	Date of death	Ref(s)
Dick Wertheim	60–61	linesman	1983 US Open	in-game brain injury	September 15, 1983	

== See also ==
- Lists of sportspeople who died during their careers
- List of sumo wrestlers who died during their careers - including a list of gyojis who died while active
