= 1969 American Football League season =

American Football League season

1969 AFL season

Regular season
- Duration: September 14 – December 14, 1969

Playoffs
- Date: December 20, 1969
- Eastern champion: 1969 New York Jets
- Western champion: Oakland Raiders
- Site: Oakland–Alameda County Coliseum, Oakland, California
- Champion: Kansas City Chiefs

AFL teams: West, East

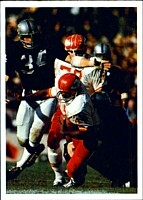
The Chiefs topped the Raiders in the 1969 AFL championship game.

The 1969 AFL season was the tenth and final regular season of the American Football League. To honor the AFL's tenth season, a special anniversary logo was designed and each Kansas City Chiefs player wore a patch on his jersey with the logo during Super Bowl IV, the final AFL-NFL World Championship Game prior to the AFL–NFL merger.

The Chiefs defeated the Oakland Raiders in the final AFL Championship Game, then soundly defeated the National Football League's Minnesota Vikings in Super Bowl IV.

== Division races ==
In its final two years of existence, the AFL had ten teams, grouped into two divisions. Each team played a home-and-away game against the other four teams in its division, a home-and-away series against one of the five teams in opposite division, and one game each against the remaining four teams from the opposite division. Using that format, the defending World Champion New York Jets went 10–0 against the five teams they played twice, but were 0–4 against the top four teams in the West.

For the 1969 season, a provision was made for a four-team playoff to determine the AFL champion, the league's representative in the Super Bowl, with the #1 team in the division hosting the #2 team in the opposite division. The NFL also had a four-team playoff, introduced in 1967, matching the winners of the Capitol and Century divisions, and the Coastal and Central divisions.

The 1970 merger placed the ten AFL teams (along with three teams from the pre-1970 NFL) into the 13-team AFC. The other NFL teams went into the 13-team NFC.

Week	Eastern #1		Eastern #2		Western #1		Western #2	
1	N.Y. Jets	1–0–0	Hou, Bos, Buf, Mia	0–1–0	Oak, KC, Den, Cin	1–0–0	Oak, KC, Den, Cin	1–0–0
2	Hou, NY	1–1–0	Hou, NY	1–1–0	Oak, KC, Den, Cin	2–0–0	Oak, KC, Den, Cin	2–0–0
3	Houston	2–1–0	NY, Buf	1–2–0	Oak, Cin	3–0–0	Oak, Cin	3–0–0
4	Houston	3–1–0	N.Y. Jets	2–2–0	Oakland	3–0–1	Kansas City	3–1–0
5	NY, Hou	3–2–0	NY, Hou	3–2–0	Oakland	4–0–1	Kansas City	4–1–0
6	N.Y. Jets	4–2–0	Houston	3–3–0	Oakland	5–0–1	Kansas City	5–1–0
7	N.Y. Jets	5–2–0	Houston	4–3–0	Oakland	6–0–1	Kansas City	6–1–0
8	N.Y. Jets	6–2–0	Houston	4–4–0	Kansas City	7–1–0	Oakland	6–1–1
9	N.Y. Jets	7–2–0	Houston	4–4–1	Kansas City	8–1–0	Oakland	7–1–1
10	N.Y. Jets	7–3–0	Houston	4–4–2	Kansas City	9–1–0	Oakland	8–1–1
11	N.Y. Jets	8–3–0	Houston	5–4–2	Oakland	9–1–1	Kansas City	9–2–0
12	N.Y. Jets	8–4–0	Houston	5–5–2	Oakland	10–1–1	Kansas City	10–2–0
13	N.Y. Jets	9–4–0	Houston	5–6–2	Oakland	11–1–1	Kansas City	11–2–0
14	N.Y. Jets	10–4–0	Houston	6–6–2	Oakland	12–1–1	Kansas City	11–3–0

== Regular season ==
=== Results ===
Home/Road		Eastern Division					Western Division				
Home/Road		BOS	BUF	HOU	MIA	NY	CIN	DEN	KC	OAK	SD
Eastern	Boston Patriots		35–21	24–0	16–17	14–23			0–31	23–38	10–13
Eastern	Buffalo Bills	23–16		3–17	28–3	19–33	16–13	41–28	7–29		
Eastern	Houston Oilers	27–23	28–14		22–10	26–34	31–31	24–21			17–21
Eastern	Miami Dolphins	23–38	24–6	7–32		9–27		27–24		20–20	14–21
Eastern	New York Jets	23–17	16–6	26–17	34–31		40–7		16–34	14–27	
Western	Cincinnati Bengals	14–25			27–21	7–21		23–30	24–19	31–17	34–20
Western	Denver Broncos	35–7		20–20		21–19	27–16		13–26	14–24	13–0
Western	Kansas City Chiefs		22–19	24–0	17–10		42–22	31–17		24–27	27–3
Western	Oakland Raiders		50–21	21–17	20–17		37–17	41–10	10–6		21–16
Western	San Diego Chargers	28–18	45–6			34–27	21–14	45–24	9–27	12–24	

=== Standings ===
For its tenth and final season before merging with the NFL, the AFL instituted a four team playoff tournament with the second place teams in each division also participating.

AFL Eastern Division
	W	L	T	PCT	DIV	PF	PA	STK
New York Jets	10	4	0	.714	8–0	353	269	W2
Houston Oilers	6	6	2	.500	5–3	278	279	W1
Boston Patriots	4	10	0	.286	3–5	266	316	L2
Buffalo Bills	4	10	0	.286	2–6	230	359	L2
Miami Dolphins	3	10	1	.231	2–6	233	332	L1

Note: Tie games were not officially counted in the standings of the AFL.

AFL Western Division
	W	L	T	PCT	DIV	PF	PA	STK
Oakland Raiders	12	1	1	.923	7–1	377	242	W6
Kansas City Chiefs	11	3	0	.786	5–3	359	177	L1
San Diego Chargers	8	6	0	.571	2–6	288	276	W4
Denver Broncos	5	8	1	.385	3–5	297	344	W1
Cincinnati Bengals	4	9	1	.308	3–5	280	367	L5

== Playoffs ==
Divisional Playoff Games
December 20, 1969 – Shea Stadium
Kansas City Chiefs	13
New York Jets	6
December 21, 1969 – Oakland–Alameda County Coliseum
Houston Oilers	7
Oakland Raiders	56

AFL Championship Game
January 4, 1970 – Oakland–Alameda County Coliseum
Kansas City Chiefs	17
Oakland Raiders	7

=== Super Bowl ===
The Kansas City Chiefs defeated the Minnesota Vikings 23–7 at Tulane Stadium in New Orleans, Louisiana, on January 11, 1970. The Super Bowl Most Valuable Player Award was given to Chiefs quarterback Len Dawson

== Stadium changes ==
- After six seasons at Fenway Park, the Boston Patriots moved to Alumni Stadium at Boston College in 1969.

== Coaching changes ==
=== Offseason ===
- Boston Patriots: Mike Holovak was fired and replaced by Clive Rush.
- Buffalo Bills: John Rauch became the new Bills head coach after resigning from the Oakland Raiders. Joe Collier was fired after two games into the 1968 season, and defensive coordinator Harvey Johnson then served as interim head coach.
- Oakland Raiders: John Madden replaced John Rauch, who resigned to join the Bills. At age 33, Madden became the youngest head coach in pro football.

=== In-season ===
- San Diego Chargers: Sid Gillman sat out five games due to health issues. Charlie Waller, the team's offensive backfield coach, served as interim.

== Officials ==
Referee	Umpire	Head Linesman	Line Judge	Back Judge	Field Judge
(#12) Ben Dreith	(#27) Al Conway	(#74) Ray Dodez	(#24) Bruce Alford	(#44) Dick Eichhorst	(#58) Bob Baur
(#14) Bob Finley	(#78) Art Demmas	(#34) Harry Kessel	(#62) Gerry Hart	(#45) John Fouch	(#52) Pat Mallette
(#18) Walt Fitzgerald	(#53) Frank Kirkland	(#32) Cal Lepore	(#67) Tommy Miller	(#70) Hugh Gamber	(#55) Charley Musser
(#11) John McDonough	(#25) Walt Parker	(#35) Leo Miles	(#61) John Steffen	(#49) Hunter Jackson	(#50) Tony Skover
(#42) Jack Reader	(#20) Frank Sinkovitz	(#50) Al Saboto	(#65) Aaron Wade	(#43) Bill Kestermeier	(#57) Bill Summers
(#15) Jack Vest	(#22) Paul Trepinski	(#36) Tony Veteri	(#68) Bill Wright	(#48) Bob Rice	(#54) Bob Wortman

== See also ==
- 1969 NFL season
