= 1970 AFC Championship Game =

National Football League playoff game

| Oakland Raiders (8–4–2) | Baltimore Colts (11–2–1) |
|---|---|
| 17 | 27 |
| Head coach: John Madden | Head coach: Don McCafferty |
| | 1 | 2 | 3 | 4 | Total |
|---|---|---|---|---|---|
| OAK | 0 | 3 | 7 | 7 | 17 |
| BAL | 3 | 7 | 10 | 7 | 27 |
- Date: January 3, 1971
- Stadium: Memorial Stadium; Baltimore, Maryland
- Referee: Ben Dreith
- Attendance: 54,799

TV in the United States
- Network: NBC
- Announcers: Curt Gowdy and Kyle Rote

The 1970 AFC Championship Game was the inaugural title game (Note: In this series of articles, title game refers to pre-merger AFL and NFL Championship Games up to and including the 1969 season as well as post-merger AFC and NFC Championship Games from the 1970 season onward.) of the American Football Conference (AFC). Played on January 3, 1971, the game was hosted by the AFC East champion Baltimore Colts who played the AFC West champion Oakland Raiders at Memorial Stadium in Baltimore, Maryland. Along with the 1970 NFC Championship Game played on the same day, this game constituted the penultimate round of the 1970–71 NFL playoffs which had followed the 1970 regular season of the National Football League.

Baltimore defeated Oakland 27–17 to earn the right to represent the AFC in Super Bowl V.

== Background ==
=== 1970 AFL-NFL merger ===
Following Super Bowl IV, the NFL and rival American Football League completed their planned merger into a single league, which retained the NFL's established name and logo. As per the terms of the merger, three "old guard" NFL teams (the Colts, Cleveland Browns and Pittsburgh Steelers) agreed to join the ten AFL teams to form the American Football Conference. The other thirteen teams that contested the 1969 NFL season formed the National Football Conference.

The merger meant that the Super Bowl, originally established an interleague World Championship Game between the champions of the AFL and NFL, became the championship game of the NFL. From a mathematical perspective, the AFC Championship Game became the successor contest to the AFL Championship Game which had determined the AFL's champions during its ten-year run from 1960 to 1969, as well as its representative in the first four Super Bowls.

Both conferences were aligned into three divisions each and a new playoff format was established for both new conferences. Under the new format, the division champions qualified in addition to the Best Second Placed Team (which was quickly shortened, first informally and then officially, to wild card) to form a four team bracket in each conference. The home teams were determined at this time by an annual rotation between the three divisions, with the provision that wild card teams would neither host a playoff game, nor face their own division champion prior to the title game. The winners of the Divisional Round would contest the conference championship games, with the winner of the divisional-round game involving two division champions hosting the title game.

=== The teams ===
In addition to being the inaugural AFC title game, this was the first-ever game (regular season or playoffs) between the Colts and Raiders. Prior to this season, the teams had played in different leagues, and they did not meet in the 1970 regular season.

The Colts had appeared in four NFL title games prior to the merger. They won three of those games, with their final such victory being the only previous title game appearance in the Super Bowl era. Baltimore won the AFC East with an 11–2–1 regular season record and shut out the AFC Central champion Cincinnati Bengals 17–0 at Memorial Stadium in the divisional round to advance to the AFC Championship game.

This was the Raiders' fourth consecutive title game appearance, and also their fourth title game overall. Oakland had won the 1967 AFL Championship Game but lost the AFL title games in 1968 and 1969. The Raiders won the AFC West with an 8–4–2 regular season record. Oakland defeated the AFC East runner-up Miami Dolphins 21–14 at Oakland Coliseum in the divisional round to reach the AFC title game.

== Game summary ==
Colts quarterback Johnny Unitas's 68-yard touchdown pass to Ray Perkins in the fourth quarter gave the Colts a two score lead that the Raiders could not overcome, sending his team to their second Super Bowl in the last three years.

Baltimore dominated the first quarter, holding the Raiders to six plays and one completion, while Unitas led them to the 4-yard line where Jim O'Brien's 16-yard field goal gave them a 3–0 lead.

In the second quarter, a massive hit by Colts lineman Bubba Smith knocked Oakland QB Daryle Lamonica out of the game, and he was replaced by George Blanda. Later on, Raiders defensive back Willie Brown narrowly dropped an interception on a deep pass from Unitas. At the time this did not seem to matter much, as the incomplete pass was on third down and the Colts had to punt. But returner George Atkinson fumbled David Lee's kick and the Colts running back Sam Havrilak recovered with excellent field position. Unitas then completed a 43-yard pass to Eddie Hinton at the 2-yard line, and Norm Bulaich scored a touchdown run on the next play, increasing the lead to 10–0. Blanda then led the Raiders back, and with the aid of a roughing the punter penalty, he got them close enough for a 48-yard field goal, which he kicked himself to cut the score 10–3 at the end of the half.

Oakland tied the score early in the third quarter with Blanda's 38-yard touchdown pass to Fred Biletnikoff. Unitas responded with two key long completions to Hinton that set up O'Brien's 23-yard field goal to retake the lead at 13–10. Later in the quarter, Buliach scored on an 11-yard touchdown run, giving the Colts a 20–10 lead going into the fourth quarter.

Now down by two scores with just one quarter left, Blanda got the Raiders rolling on a long touchdown drive. First running back Charlie Smith picked up 20 yards on a draw play (the longest run of the game for either team). Then Blanda fooled the Colts defense with a fake handoff before firing a pass to Warren Wells for a 37-yard gain to the Colts 11. Blanda eventually finished the drive with a 15-yard touchdown pass to Wells on third down, making the score 20–17. The momentum seemed to be swinging back in their favor when they forced the Colts into a 3rd and 11 situation on their own 32-yard line on the next drive. On the next play, Unitas threw a deep pass to a wide open Ray Perkins, who raced down the left sideline for a 68-yard touchdown completion that gave the Colts a 27–17 lead. This would prove to be the last score of the game as the Raiders were shut out in the final 12 minutes, with Blanda throwing two interceptions deep in Baltimore territory.

Blanda finished the game completing 17 of 32 passes for 271 yards with 2 touchdowns and 3 interceptions. At 43 years old, he was the oldest quarterback ever to play in a championship game. His top target was Wells, who caught 5 passes for 108 yards and a touchdown. Unitas completed 11 of 30 passes for 245 yards and a touchdown. The Colts leading receiver was Hinton, who caught 8 passes for 115 yards. Colts linemen Bubba Smith and Ray Hilton each had two sacks, along with Raiders lineman Ben Davidson.

== Scoring ==
- First quarter
  - BAL – field goal O'Brien 16, BAL 3–0
- Second quarter
  - BAL – Bulaich 2 run (O'Brien kick), BAL 10–0
  - OAK – field goal Blanda 48, BAL 10–3
- Third quarter
  - OAK – Biletnikoff 38 pass from Blanda (Blanda kick), Tied 10–10
  - BAL – field goal O'Brien 23, BAL 13–10
  - BAL – Bulaich 11 run (O'Brien kick), BAL 20–10
- Fourth quarter
  - OAK – Wells 15 pass from Blanda (Blanda kick), BAL 20–17
  - BAL – Perkins 68 pass from Unitas (O'Brien kick), BAL 27–17

== Aftermath ==
The AFC champion Colts made their second Super Bowl appearance. Baltimore defeated the Dallas Cowboys of the National Football Conference 16–13 in Super Bowl V to win their first Super Bowl and fourth NFL title overall. (Note: Baltimore won three NFL Championships prior to the merger, in 1958-1959 and in 1968 (when the Colts were beaten in Super Bowl III by the AFL Champions, the New York Jets).)

The Colts would return to the AFC title game the following season, but were shut out 21–0 by the Miami Dolphins. This would turn out to be the final home playoff win for the Colts in Baltimore before they moved to Indianapolis in 1984. It was the only AFC Championship Game to have been played in Baltimore until 2023. By the time the Colts hosted their first AFC Championship Game in Indianapolis (which they won en route to their first Super Bowl win as an Indianapolis team), Baltimore had already won an AFC title and a Super Bowl with their current franchise, the Ravens.

While the Ravens appeared in four AFC Championship Games between 2000 and 2012 - winning both the AFC title and Super Bowl twice - all of their Conference Championship Games have been on the road. They would host their first AFC Championship game in the 2023 season.

The Raiders would return to the AFC Championship Game in 1973, which would turn out to be the first of another streak of five consecutive title game appearances, although they would have to wait until the fourth of these games before finally capturing their first AFC (and Super Bowl) championships.

== See also ==
- 1970 NFC Championship Game
- AFC Championship Game
- 1970-71 NFL playoffs
- 1970 NFL season
- American Football Conference
- National Football League
