= James Barnhill =

James Barnhill may refer to:

- James Barnhill (referee) (1921–1966), American football and basketball referee
- James Barnhill (artist) (born 1955), American artist
