= Harry Kessel =

American football official (1925–1972)

No. 73, 34
- Position: Head linesman

Personal information
- Born: September 22, 1925; Parkersburg, West Virginia, US
- Died: October 9, 1972 (aged 47); Athens, Ohio, US

Career information
- College: Ohio

Career history
- American Football League (1963–1969); National Football League (1970–1972)

Awards and highlights
- Super Bowl I (1967) (alternate LJ); Super Bowl IV (1970)

Other information
- Military career
- Allegiance: United States
- Branch: United States Navy
- Conflicts: World War II

Harry Roger Kessel (September 22, 1925 – October 9, 1972) was an American football official in the American Football League (AFL) and the National Football League (NFL) for a combined ten years. He was a head linesman (HL), and wore uniform number 34 in the AFL, and 73 in the NFL.

== Career ==
Kessel made his officiating debut during the 1963 American Football League season. He was a head linesman for the 1964 season and continued in that role for the rest of his career, occasionally filling in as an umpire or a line judge. He was selected as an alternate line judge for Super Bowl I in 1967.

At the conclusion of the AFL–NFL merger, Kessel was part of the officiating staff for the 1970 NFL season. He worked Super Bowl IV as HL the previous postseason. He worked one more full season before his death less than a month into the 1972 season.

== Personal life ==
Harry Kessel was born September 22, 1925 in Parkersburg, West Virginia. His father’s name was Herman Kessel. Harry moved to Athens, Ohio, to attend Ohio University, and served with the United States Navy during World War II before his career as a professional football official. He also worked for the Ohio State Auditor, and officiated high school football and basketball.

Kessel was married, and had a son. He died on October 9, 1972, in Athens, at age 47.

== See also ==
- List of NFL officials
- List of American Football League officials
- List of sports officials who died while active
