= George Ellis (American football official) =

American football official (1920–1974)

No. 9, 44
- Position: Field judge, back judge

Personal information
- Born: June 23, 1920; Lebanon, Tennessee, U.S.
- Died: July 31, 1974 (aged 54); Cleveland, Ohio, U.S.

Career information
- High school: East (Akron, Ohio)
- College: Akron

Career history
- American Football League (1963–1964); National Football League (1968–1973)

Awards and highlights
- Super Bowl V (1971) (possible alternate)

George Lee Ellis (June 23, 1920 – July 31, 1974) was an American football official in the American Football League and the National Football League for a combined eight years. He was a field judge (FJ), and wore uniform numbers 44 and 9 in the AFL. He continued to wear number 9 in the NFL.

== Early life ==
George Ellis was born June 23, 1920, in Lebanon, Tennessee. He moved to Akron, Ohio in his youth and graduated from East High School, where he played basketball. He attended the University of Akron before dropping out to become a machinist.

== Career ==
Ellis began his career officiating football and basketball at the high school level. He moved on to college sports where he worked in the Ohio Athletic Conference, the Mid-American Conference, and the Big Ten Conference.

He began his professional career in the AFL, working as a back judge for the 1963 and 1964 seasons. He also spent two seasons officiating in the Continental Football League.

Ellis was hired as an NFL official for the 1968 season. He switched his position to field judge, where he would remain for the final six years of his career. He was involved with Super Bowl V in 1971, but was not recorded as one of the game officials.

He spent his final two seasons on injured reserve, as he broke his leg during the 1972 preseason, and suffered from kidney issues during the 1973 season. He died that offseason.

=== 1968 suspension ===
On December 8, 1968, Ellis was part of the crew officiating a game between the Los Angeles Rams and the Chicago Bears, when they lost track of the downs. This became apparent late in the game when the Rams were penalized for offensive holding, yet the down was not replayed. As explained by then NFL commissioner Pete Rozelle:

National Football League game officials erred in not permitting Los Angeles one more down near the end of the Rams game with the Chicago Bears Sunday. A penalty against Los Angeles on the first down of its final series nullified an incomplete pass play. Following three additional incomplete passes by Los Angeles, the ball was turned over to Chicago, thus depriving Los Angeles of a fourth down play to which it was entitled. Los Angeles would have started the fourth down from its own 47-yard line with five seconds to play and 31 yards needed for a first down. All six game officials are equally responsible for keeping track of the downs.

Rozelle proceeded to suspend the crew, led by referee Norm Schachter, for the remainder of the season and the entirety of the 1968 postseason. This was the first time any NFL official received a suspension, and the only time an entire officiating crew has been suspended.

== Personal life ==
Ellis ran a sporting goods business, known as the George Ellis Sports Centers, and had opened two locations in Fairlawn and Cuyahoga Falls, Ohio.

He died on July 31, 1974, at the Cleveland Clinic, aged 53.

== See also ==
- List of NFL officials
- List of American Football League officials
- List of sports officials who died while active
