= Red Cashion =

American football official (1931–2019)

- Born: Mason L. Cashion; November 10, 1931; College Station, Texas, U.S.
- Died: February 10, 2019 (aged 87)
- Education: Texas A&M University
- Occupation: NFL official (1972–1996)
- Spouse: Lou Burgess Cashion (d.1999)

Mason Lee "Red" Cashion (November 10, 1931 – February 10, 2019) was an American football official for 25 seasons in the National Football League (NFL), where he was the referee for two Super Bowls.

== Biography ==
Cashion started officiating in 1952 while attending Texas A&M University, and then worked for various high school and college football conferences, most notably the Southwest Conference. From 1972 to 1996, he officiated in the National Football League (NFL), and was the referee in Super Bowl XX and Super Bowl XXX. Cashion began his career as a line judge in 1972 following the death of referee Jack Vest, which in turn created an opening at line judge when Chuck Heberling was promoted to referee to replace Vest. Cashion was promoted to referee in 1976 upon the retirement of long-time referee Norm Schachter and the additions of Seattle and Tampa Bay to the NFL. As a line judge, Cashion was on the crews of Fred Swearingen (1972), Ben Dreith (1973-74) and Fred Silva (1975).

He wore uniform number 43 for most of his career, which was worn by field judge and side judge Terry Brown from 2006-25. During the 1979–1981 seasons, when officials were numbered separately by positions instead of having one number assigned to each official, he wore number 8.

Cashion was known by NFL players, coaches, and fans for his signature first down call in which he would enthusiastically drawl "First dowwwwwn!" out to the crowd. In a 1997 interview with the Sporting News, he said, "I don't know of any time that started it or stopped it. It was just something that sort of evolved and been there ever since". Cashion's promotion to referee came just one season after the NFL began equipping referees with wireless microphones to explain penalty calls and complex rulings to fans in the stadium, members of the media, and the television audience at home.

Cashion was inducted into the Texas Sports Hall of Fame in 1999. He also provided the voice of the referee for several versions of the Madden NFL video game.

Cashion died at age 87 on February 10, 2019.
