= Dan Sullivan (American football) =

American football player (1939–2025)

No. 71
- Position: Offensive lineman

Personal information
- Born: September 1, 1939; Boston, Massachusetts, U.S.
- Died: April 7, 2025 (aged 85); Haverhill, Massachusetts, U.S.
- Listed height: 6 ft 3 in (1.91 m)
- Listed weight: 250 lb (113 kg)

Career information
- High school: Boston Technical
- College: Boston College
- NFL draft: 1962: 3rd round, 37th overall pick
- AFL draft: 1962: 10th round, 80th overall pick

Career history
- Baltimore Colts (1962–1972)

Awards and highlights
- Super Bowl champion (V); NFL champion 1968; First-team All-Pro (1968)

Career NFL statistics
- Games played: 140
- Games started: 90
- Fumble recoveries: 2
- Stats at Pro Football Reference

Daniel Joseph Sullivan (September 1, 1939 – April 7, 2025) was an American professional football player who was an offensive lineman for the Baltimore Colts of the National Football League (NFL) from 1962 through 1972. He played college football for the Boston College Eagles. Sullivan started in two Super Bowls for the Colts, including their win in Super Bowl V.

== Early life and college ==
Sullivan was born on September 1, 1939, in Boston, Massachusetts, and grew up in Dorchester. He played football at Boston Technical High School, as well as hockey as a defenseman. He made all-scholastic teams in both football and hockey.

He earned a full scholarship to Boston College (BC), for both football and hockey. He played college football there as a starting offensive tackle, where he was considered the cornerstone of the team's offense. He also played defensive line. Sullivan played in the 1962 Chicago All-Star game against the Green Bay Packers.

He graduated with a Bachelor of Science degree in business. He was on the dean's list three of his four years at BC. Boston College presented Sullivan its Scanlan Award, the highest football honor which goes to a senior football player epitomizing athletic ability, leadership and scholarship. In 1976, he was inducted into the Boston College Varsity Club Hall of Fame.

== Professional football career ==
The Colts selected Sullivan in the third round of the 1962 NFL draft with the 37th overall pick. The American Football League's Los Angeles Chargers also drafted him in the AFL draft (80th overall). He chose the Colts, signing for $9,500 and then played backup offensive lineman until he became a full-time starter in 1966, remaining a starter until his retirement. He played for the team from 1962 to 1972 and missed only two games with injuries. His highest annual salary was $47,000. He played under Hall of Fame coaches Weeb Ewbank (1962) and Don Shula (1963-69). In his rookie season, he played some on offense and defense.

In 1967, the Colts offense led the NFL in yardage, and was second in points scored. The team's record was 11–1–2, but they missed the playoffs because of a division tie with the Los Angeles Rams.

In 1968, Sullivan was named first-team All-Conference by The Sporting News. The Colts won the 1968 NFL championship, and their offense that year was second in the NFL in scoring and fourth in total offensive yards. Sullivan appeared in Super Bowl III as the starting right guard, a loss to the New York Jets. In 1970, the Colts offense was in the top-ten in total yards and points scored. The Colts won the 1970 AFC championship game over the Oakland Raiders. They went on to win Super Bowl V over the Dallas Cowboys, with Sullivan as the starting right tackle.

Sullivan was mentored early in his career by Colts Pro Football Hall of Fame player Art Donovan, who had also gone to Boston College, and treated Sullivan like an adopted son. Donovan and former Colt and BC alumni Art Spinney, BC’s then current line coach, had originally recommended Sullivan to the Colts. During his Colts career, Sullivan played every offensive line position, and the team's record was 104–45–5. He was known for his speed in leading sweeps.

== Post-football life ==
Sullivan worked for the Mrs. Filbert's food company in Baltimore from 1966 to 1978, before and after his playing days, rising to national sales manager. Sullivan also worked for Eastern Sales and Marketing, run by his college linemate John Buckley, where he became a senior vice president in charge of corporate sales and marketing. After retiring, he remained close friends with Colts legendary Hall of fame quarterback Johnny Unitas. One of Sullivan's keepsakes is a photo of Unitas and Sullivan's daughter Julie, who has Down syndrome, laughing arm-in-arm. Sullivan was an advocate for the special needs community and served on the boards of many organizations.

== Death ==
Sullivan died in Haverhill, Massachusetts on April 7, 2025, at the age of 85. He was a resident of Andover, Massachusetts at the time. He was survived by his wife of over 60 years, Lorraine (Rabbitt) Sullivan, three children, and three grandchildren.
