= Eddie Hinton (American football) =

American football player (born 1947)

- Hinton in 1970

No. 33, 87, 22
- Position: Wide receiver

Personal information
- Born: June 26, 1947 (age 79); Lawton, Oklahoma, U.S.
- Listed height: 6 ft 0 in (1.83 m)
- Listed weight: 200 lb (91 kg)

Career information
- High school: Lawton
- College: Oklahoma (1966–1968)
- NFL draft: 1969: 1st round, 25th overall pick

Career history
- Baltimore Colts (1969–1972); Houston Oilers (1973); New England Patriots (1974)

Awards and highlights
- Super Bowl champion (V); Third-team All-American (1968); First-team All-Big Eight (1968)

Career NFL statistics
- Receptions: 111
- Receiving yards: 1,822
- Rushing yards: 110
- Rushing average: 9.2
- Total touchdowns: 12
- Stats at Pro Football Reference

Edward Gerald Hinton (born June 26, 1947) is an American former professional football player who was a wide receiver for six seasons in the National Football League (NFL). Hinton spent four seasons with the Baltimore Colts, including their 1970 Super Bowl winning season, and one season each with the Houston Oilers and New England Patriots. He played college football for the Oklahoma Sooners.

== Early life ==
Eddie Hinton was born on June 26, 1947 in Lawton, Oklahoma. Hinton began playing sports in fifth grade to escape his unpleasant home life. His parents were bootleggers and he claimed his family had a poor reputation in their neighborhood.

Hinton was a multi-sport athlete at Lawton High School. In his senior year, Hinton earned All-State honors as a halfback on the football team, started on the state-runner up basketball team, and won a state title in track in the low hurdles, earning him the Boomer Conference Athlete of the Year award. Hinton was also selected to represent Oklahoma in the 1965 Oil Bowl high school all-star game. He subsequently received a football scholarship to the University of Oklahoma.

== College career ==
Hinton played for three years at Oklahoma as a halfback and defensive back. Under Sooners offensive coordinator Barry Switzer, Hinton had a productive college career as both a pass catcher and rusher.

In the fall of 1967, Hinton was one of nine college students on the Oklahoma University campus to charter the Alpha Phi Alpha fraternity Zeta Zeta chapter.

=== 1966 season ===
In Hinton's sophomore year, Oklahoma started the season with four straight wins, reaching #10 in the AP poll. The team ultimately finished at 6–4, fifth in the Big Eight Conference. Hinton appeared in all 10 games with 26 receptions for 341 yards and two touchdowns and 270 rushing yards and four rushing touchdowns. Hinton also recorded a 93-yard punt return for a touchdown against Colorado.

=== 1967 season ===
In his junior season, Hinton again appeared in all 10 games and led the team in receiving with 28 receptions for 427 yards and three touchdowns. He also rushed for 250 yards and three touchdowns. Oklahoma went 10–1 and won the Big Eight Conference. The #3 ranked Sooners faced #2 Tennessee in the Orange Bowl, winning 26–24.

=== 1968 season ===
Despite suffering a broken hand, Hinton's senior year was his best statistical season at Oklahoma. Hinton led the Big Eight Conference in all major receiving categories with 60 receptions for 967 yards and six touchdowns. After his senior season, Hinton was named to the 1968 AP All-America Third team and was named as an Academic All-American.

Oklahoma went 7–4 on the season and were co-champions of the Big Eight Conference with Kansas. The Sooners earned a postseason bowl invite to play SMU in the Bluebonnet Bowl, which they lost 27–28. The team finished the 1968 season ranked #11 in the AP poll.

== Professional career ==
Hinton was selected by the Baltimore Colts with the 25th overall pick in the first round of the 1969 NFL/AFL draft.

=== Baltimore Colts (1969–1972) ===
==== 1969 season ====
In Hinton's rookie year, he saw limited playing time until the latter half of the season. His best game came in a snowy week 12 contest against the Detroit Lions where Hinton had five receptions for 134 yards and one touchdown. He finished the season with 13 receptions for 269 yards and one receiving touchdown and added another rushing touchdown. The Colts finished the season at 8–5, placing second in the Coastal Division standings and missing the playoffs.

==== 1970 season ====
In 1970, Hinton became a starter at wide receiver and was a key contributor to the Colts' Super Bowl winning team. Hinton started 13 games and recorded his best statistical season in the NFL with 47 receptions for 733 yards and five touchdowns. He also added two rushing touchdowns. His best game of the season came in week two during the second-ever telecast of Monday Night Football against the Kansas City Chiefs. The Colts were routed 24–44, but Hinton served as the lone bright spot with 11 receptions for 190 yards and one touchdown.

The Colts recovered from the blowout loss and finished the regular season at 11–2–1. The Colts won the AFC East Division and earned a place in the 1970–71 playoffs. In Hinton's first playoff appearance against the Cincinnati Bengals he had three receptions for 86 yards and one touchdown. His longest catch was a 53-yard touchdown reception from quarterback Johnny Unitas in the fourth quarter to seal the Colts' 17–0 victory.

The following week, the Colts faced the Oakland Raiders in the inaugural 1970 AFC Championship Game. Hinton again performed well with five receptions for 115 yards. Although he did not score, Hinton was the Colts' leading receiver and had several long receptions to set up scoring plays. The Colts won 27–17 and earned a spot in the Super Bowl.

In Super Bowl V, the Colts faced the Dallas Cowboys at the Orange Bowl in Miami, Florida. In what later became known as the "Blunder Bowl" due to the poor level of play, the Colts defeated the Cowboys 16–13 on a last second field goal by kicker Jim O'Brien. Hinton had two receptions for 51 yards in the game.

Hinton was also involved in two plays that contributed to the game's mocking nickname. In the second quarter, a Unitas pass intended for Hinton sailed high and bounced off his hands. The ball was then tipped by Cowboys defender Mel Renfro before falling into the arms of Colts tight end John Mackey who ran for a 75-yard touchdown. Hinton later caught a pass from wide receiver Sam Havrilak on a broken flea flicker play, but the ball was stripped by Renfro and Cornell Green on the Cowboys' 11-yard line. Several players attempted to control the ball before it eventually bounced through the back of the end zone for a Cowboys touchback.

==== 1971 season ====
In his third professional season, Hinton and fellow receiver Ray Perkins maintained the Colts' dynamic passing attack. Hinton led the Colts in receiving yards with 25 receptions for 436 yards and two touchdowns. His two best regular season performances for the year came against the New England Patriots. In their week three matchup, Hinton had four receptions for 81 yards with the Colts winning 23–3. In week 14, Hinton scored both of the Colts' touchdowns, with a total of four receptions for 74 yards, in a 17–21 loss.

The Colts finished 10–4 and earned a wild card berth to the playoffs. In a Divisional round win against the Cleveland Browns, Hinton had two catches for 30 yards. In the 1971 AFC Championship Game against the Miami Dolphins, Hinton caught six passes for 98 yards, but the Colts lost the game 0–21.

==== 1972 season ====
The 1972 season was a disappointment for both the Colts and Hinton. In the season's opening game, Hinton suffered a hamstring injury that lingered throughout the rest of the season. Hinton only appeared in eight games and totaled 11 receptions for 146 yards and one touchdown.

Hinton's lone touchdown was an important moment in an otherwise meaningless week 12 win against the Buffalo Bills. Quarterback Marty Domres, who had taken over earlier in the season for a benched Johnny Unitas, was injured and forced out of the game. Unitas entered the game and threw a 63-yard touchdown pass to Hinton in the fourth quarter, Unitas' last touchdown pass as a Baltimore Colt.

Hinton later said about the play, "I saw [the ball] coming and thought, 'Oh, my gosh, it's going to be intercepted.' I couldn't allow that to happen. I came back for the ball, reached over my shoulder and snatched it. Then I reversed field and just kept running. It was like I was walking on air and nobody could touch me. But I felt like I had to score that for [Unitas]."

The Colts ended the season at 5–9 and did not make the playoffs. Under new ownership, the Colts began to make coaching and player personnel changes. Hinton was a casualty of the team's new direction, and was cut by the Colts prior to the start of the 1973 season.

=== Houston Oilers (1973) ===
Hinton was claimed by the Houston Oilers at the beginning of the 1973 season. Houston struggled throughout the season, finishing with a 1–13 record. Hinton also struggled. Hobbled by lingering injuries, Hinton only recorded 13 catches for 202 yards and one touchdown. Hinton also returned kickoffs, with eight returns for 141 yards.

Two days prior to the conclusion of the 1974 NFL Strike in August 1974, Hinton reported to Oilers training camp. However, the Oilers cut Hinton in early September prior to the start of the regular season.

=== New England Patriots (1974) ===
Hinton was signed by the New England Patriots on October 17, 1974. Hinton had multiple connections that brought him to New England. Patriots' head coach Chuck Fairbanks was Hinton's head coach at Oklahoma, while Patriots' receivers coach was former Colts teammate Ray Perkins. Fairbanks hoped that Hinton could easily adjust to the Patriots' offense because of this familiarity. Hinton was brought in to strengthen the Patriots receiver group after Darryl Stingley suffered a spinal cord injury in a pre-season game, which ended Stingley's career and left him as a quadriplegic.

Hinton's role was limited during his season with the Patriots. He appeared in nine games, but only made one start, and recorded two receptions for 36 yards. The Patriots finished the season at 7–7. Hinton was placed on waivers by the Patriots in April 1975.

== NFL career statistics ==
Legend
	Won the Super Bowl
**Bold**	Career high

=== Regular season ===
Year	Team	Games		Receiving					Rushing					Fumbles	
Year	Team	GP	GS	Rec	Yds	Avg	Lng	TD	Att	Yds	Avg	Lng	TD	Fum	Lost
1969	BAL	12	3	13	269	**20.7**	46	1	1	−3	−3.0	−3	0	0	0
1970	BAL	13	**13**	**47**	**733**	15.6	40	**5**	**5**	**58**	11.6	21	2	0	0
1971	BAL	**14**	11	25	436	17.4	33	2	4	56	**14.0**	30	0	0	0
1972	BAL	8	2	11	146	13.3	**63**	1	0	0	0.0	0	0	1	0
1973	HOU	11	1	13	202	15.5	34	1	1	−2	−2.0	−2	0	1	1
1974	NE	9	1	2	36	18.0	20	0	1	1	1.0	1	0	1	0
Career		67	31	111	1,822	16.4	63	10	12	110	9.2	30	2	3	1

=== Postseason ===
Year	Team	Games		Receiving					Rushing					Fumbles	
Year	Team	GP	GS	Rec	Yds	Avg	Lng	TD	Att	Yds	Avg	Lng	TD	Fum	Lost
1970	BAL	**3**	**3**	**10**	**252**	**25.2**	**53**	**1**	1	−5	−5.0	−5	0	1	0
1971	BAL	2	2	8	128	16.0	27	0	0	0	0	0	0	0	0
Career		5	5	18	380	21.1	53	1	1	-5	-5.0	-5	0	1	0

== Personal life ==
After retiring from football, Hinton became a homebuilder. Hinton now lives on a farm in Spring Branch, Texas, with his wife and several animals. He previously served as a school bus driver for local school districts with the goal of helping troubled children.
