= List of American Football League officials =

The American Football League (AFL, 1960–1969) had a unique take on the uniforms of referees, umpires, line judges, field judges and back judges. With their red-orange stripes, black collars and cuffs, and AFL logos on their shirt fronts, sleeves and caps, they were not only more colorful, but easier to see than those of the other league. They were especially unique when seen on color television, which was also on the rise in the 1960s. Both the National Football League and All-America Football Conference had used colored uniforms in the 1940s. Referees wore black caps while all other officials wore red caps. The AFL outfitted their officials in red orange striped uniforms until 1968 when, in preparation for the merger, all AFL on field officials began to wear uniforms similar to those worn in the NFL.

In his book COLORS, Jim Finks Jr., son of Pro Football Hall-of-Famer Jim Finks Sr., shows the original uniform of AFL official Jack Reader, who was a back judge in the first AFL game in 1960 and in both the first and third AFL-NFL World Championship games. Reader was in an iconic January 20, 1969 Sports Illustrated photo, signaling a touchdown after Matt Snell's 4-yard plunge against the Colts.

The following list indicates men who were American Football League on-field officials: an important but seldom-credited part of the game. Nine, as shown in the list below, officiated in the American Football League for the entire ten years of its existence, 1960 through 1969. They were: Ben Dreith (FJ, R); Bob Finley (U, R); Hugh Gamber (BJ, FJ); Elvin Hutchison (HL); John McDonough (R); Walt Parker (U); Jack Reader (BJ, R); Al Sabato (HL) and George Young (U).

There were 34 on-field officials in the AFL in 1969, the league's last year of play. 33 of them were good enough to continue to officiate after the merger. One of them was Cal Lepore, now known as "the father of instant replay". He also promulgated the use of replay to review the accuracy of on-field calls, for the evaluation of officials. Another important link from the American Football League to today's professional football.

Name	Position	College	Years active	Number
James Barnhill	Referee	Marquette	1960–1965	15
Bob Baur	Field Judge	Ohio	1963–1969	58
Peppy Blount	Line Judge	Texas	1966–1967	64
Harold Bourne	Referee	Missouri	1960–1964	12
Gilbert Castree	Umpire	Virginia	1960–1964	24
Al Conway	Umpire	William Jewell	1969	27
Art Demmas	Umpire	Vanderbilt	1968–1969	78
Clyde Devine	Umpire	Oregon St	1960–1968	20
Ben Dreith	Field Judge, Referee	Colorado St	1960–1969	53, 12
Ray Dodez	Line Judge, Head Linesman	Wooster	1968–1969	74
Dick Eichhorst	Back Judge	Missouri	1968–1969	44
George Ellis	--	Akron	1963–1964	9, 44
Bob Finley	Umpire, Referee	SMU	1960–1969	22, 14
Walt Fitzgerald	Referee	Boston College	1961–1969	18
John Fouch	Back Judge	USC	1966–1969	45, 34
Kenny Gallagher	Back Judge	Oklahoma St	1961–1968	36, 46
Hugh Gamber	Back Judge, Field Judge	Dubuque	1960–1969	33, 70
Fritz Graf	Field Judge	Case Western Reserve	1960	55
Gerald Hart	Line Judge	West Point; Kansas	1968–1969	62
Al Huetter	Umpire	Columbia	1961–1968	52, 28
Elvin Hutchison	Head Linesman	Whittier	1960–1969	32, 33
Hunter Jackson	Line Judge, Back Judge	East Tennessee St	1966–1969	49
Harry Kessel	Head Linesman	Ohio	1963–1969	34
Bill Kestermeier	Back Judge	Rose Poly Inst	1969	43
Frank Kirkland	Field Judge	Cal-Santa Barbara	1963–1969	53
Joe Kraus	Head Linesman	Hobart	1960–1962	34
Cal Lepore	Line Judge, Head Linesman	Alabama	1966–1969	32
Charles Liley	Field Judge	Denver	1960	52
Pat Mallette	Field Judge	Nebraska	1969	52
Bo McAllister	Head Linesman	Oklahoma St	1960–1967	35
John McDonough	Referee	Stanford	1960–1969	11
George McGuane	--	Holy Cross	1961–1964	54
Jack McLain	Referee	Northern Arizona	1960	14
Carl Mellinger	Line Judge	NJ St Teachers	1966	61
Leo Miles	Head Linesman	Virginia St	1969	35
Tommy Miller	Line Judge	Milligan College	1968–1969	67
John Morrow	Referee	Texas A&M	1960–1962	16
Charlie Musser	Field Judge	North Carolina St	1965–1969	55
George Parker	Back Judge	St. Louis	1960	40
Walt Parker	Umpire	North Texas St	1960–1969	25
Jack Reader	Back Judge, Referee	Holy Cross	1960–1969	42
Bob Rice	Back Judge	Denison U	1969	48
Frank Rustich	Field Judge	Canisius	1961–1968	14, 51
James Ryan	Field Judge	--	1960	50
Al Sabato	Head Linesman	Cincinnati, Xavier	1960–1969	30
Amby Schindler	Back Judge	USC	1960–1962	43
John Steffen	Line Judge	Minnesota	1968–1969	61
William Stein	--	Georgia Tech	1961–1962	27
Bill Summers	Line Judge, Field Judge	Notre Dame	1967–1969	57
Paul Trepinski	Umpire	Toledo	1963–1969	22
Price Truitt	Field Judge	North Texas St	1960	54
Dick Ulrich	Head Linesman	Grinnell	1960	54
Jack Vest	Referee	East Tennessee St	1965–1969	15
Tony Veteri	Head Linesman	none	1961–1969	26, 36
Aaron Wade	Line Judge	Los Angeles St	1966–1969	65
Bob Whetstone	Back Judge	Ohio St	1965–1968	40
Bob Wortman	Field Judge	Findlay	1965–1967, 1969	54
Bill Wright	Line Judge	High Point	1968–1969	68
George Young	Umpire	Georgia	1960–1969	26, 23

Notes:

- Bob Austin (AFL Supervisor of Officials, 1960–1965)
- Mel Hein (AFL Supervisor of Officials, 1966–1969)
- Jack Reader (Officiated the first AFL game in 1960. Ten-year American Football League official, 1960–1969)
- Jim Tunney received an offer from the AFL to be a referee in 1960, but chose to go to the NFL as a field judge.
- Years before Pete Gogolak, Fritz Graf was the first "jumper" from the AFL to the NFL. He was in the AFL in 1960, officiated its first Championship, then went to the NFL in 1961.
- Jack Reader, who died in 2008, was a ten-year AFL official who worked the league's first game (Broncos-Patriots) on September 9, 1960, and the first Super Bowl.
- Bob Wortman was the first man to officiate both a Super Bowl and an NCAA basketball championship.
- Frank Rustich was an AFL line judge and also a boxing referee who officiated at the 1973 Ken Norton - Muhammad Ali Heavyweight Boxing Championship.

== See also ==
- List of American Football League players
