= Peppy Blount =

American football player, politician, and World War II pilot

Ralph Eugene Blount
Profile
- Position: End

Personal information
- Born: October 24, 1924; Ferris, Texas, U.S.
- Died: June 22, 2010 (aged 85); Longview, Texas U.S.
- Listed height: 6 ft 7 in (2.01 m)

Career information
- High school: Big Spring (Big Spring, Texas)
- College: The University of Texas

Other information
- Military career
- Allegiance: United States
- Branch: United States Army
- Service years: 1943–1945
- Rank: Captain
- Unit: United States Army Air Forces
- Conflicts: World War II
- Awards: Distinguished Flying Cross, Air Medal, Presidential Unit Citation (x2), Battle Star (x6)

Ralph Eugene "Peppy" Blount (October 19, 1924 – June 22, 2010) was an American collegiate football end and official; member of the Texas house of representatives; former World War II pilot of a B-25J and author of several books about life, war and football.

== Early life ==
Blount was born in Ferris, Texas and moved with his family to Big Spring, Texas when he was five years old.

After graduating from Big Spring High School he joined the U.S. Army Air Corps. At 19, he was the youngest pilot of a B-25 bomber strafer in the South Pacific during World War II. He earned more than 15 military decorations including the Distinguished Flying Cross, the Air Medal with three clusters, two Presidential Unit Citations and six major Battle Stars. In 1945, just before the end of World War II, First Lieutenant Blount participated in the attack of the Japanese cargo ship Kanju Maru at Saigon.

== Football ==
After the war, he returned to the University of Texas where he letter for three years in football (1945, 1947–48). With quarterback Bobby Layne, he helped the team to win the Southwest Conference Championship and Cotton Bowl in 1945 and finish ranked #10. He was on the roster, but did not letter for the 1946 season, but in 1947 he helped the Longhorns win the Sugar Bowl and finish ranked #5 and in 1948 he helped them win the Orange Bowl.

He also lettered in basketball, where he played center, in 1946 and played baseball for Texas.

While at Texas, he was a “principal” speaker on the high school speaking circuit. According to conference rules only coaches could be a principal speakers, so Coach Dana X. Bible got around it by making Blount a member of the coaching staff.

In 1946, he was elected to the state legislature and as a result lost eligibility for his scholarship, but Coach Bible allowed Blount to continue to live in the athletic dorm and maintained his dining room privileges at no charge. The G.I. bill paid for Blount’s tuition and books.

He was the ninth-round draft choice of the Chicago Bears in 1948, but chose to stay and finished school rather than play for the Bears. He was signed by the New York Bulldogs in 1949, where he was reunited with Layne, but released without playing for them.

He never played professional football, but became an on-field official, and was a line judge in the American Football League in 1966 and 1967.

== Later life ==
Blount started his career in politics. He first ran for and won office in 1946 unseating the incumbent, Cecil H. Barnes of San Angelo. During his time in office he sponsored the legislation creating the Colorado River Municipal Water District in Howard County. He served in the legislature even while he was a student and football player. He served until September 1951 when he resigned to go into the oil business in Tyler, Texas. In 1956 he announced a run for the state Senate but switched to run for Congress when Brady P. Gentry decided not to run. He lost the race to Lindley Beckworth. In 1962 he was elected Gregg County Judge on a write-in ballot, the highest elective office ever achieved in the State of Texas by a write-in ballot on voting machines. In 1982 he ran for District 1 of the State Senate but lost the Democratic Nomination to Ed Howard of Texarkana.

He was a practicing attorney in Longview, Texas from 1956 till his retirement in February 2010 and was honored by the State Bar of Texas for his more than 50 years as an attorney. He was active in and a leader of several community organizations including the Masons and the Boy Scouts.

He was inducted into both the Commemorative Air Force's Combat Airmen's Hall of Fame in Midland, Texas; and the Southwest Football Official's Hall of Fame.

He wrote several books, including We Band of Brothers; Mamas, Don't Let Your Babies Grow Up to Play Football; A Time For All Reasons; and All Things Considered... It's Been a Good Life.

His son, Jeb Blount, played college football at Tulsa and spent 3 years in the NFL where he earned a Super Bowl ring with the 1976 Oakland Raiders.

Blount died at his home on June 22, 2010.

== See also ==
- List of American Football League officials
