= Sam Havrilak =

American football player (born 1947)

No. 17, 80
- Positions: Defensive back, running back, wide receiver

Personal information
- Born: December 13, 1947 (age 78); Monessen, Pennsylvania, U.S.
- Listed height: 6 ft 2 in (1.88 m)
- Listed weight: 195 lb (88 kg)

Career information
- High school: Monessen
- College: Bucknell
- NFL draft: 1969: 8th round, 207th overall pick

Career history
- Baltimore Colts (1969–1973); New Orleans Saints (1974)

Awards and highlights
- Super Bowl champion (V)

Career NFL statistics
- Rushing attempts: 73
- Rushing yards: 289
- Receptions: 51
- Receiving yards: 761
- Touchdowns: 7
- Games played: 75
- Stats at Pro Football Reference

Samuel Charles Havrilak (born December 13, 1947) is an American former professional football player who was a running back in the National Football League (NFL) from 1969 to 1974. He played college football for the Bucknell Bison. Havrilak earned a Super Bowl ring with the Baltimore Colts in January 1971 at Super Bowl V. He was the first player in Super Bowl history to complete a pass, catch a pass, and rush for a positive gain.

== College career ==
After attending Monessen High School near Pittsburgh, Havrilak played college football at Bucknell University, where he was named to the All-Pennsylvania Team and MVP of the Middle Atlantic Conference as a senior. He was also a member of the Sigma Chi fraternity. Havrilak holds the Bucknell University record for total offense with 397 yards against Colgate in 1968. He was elected to the Bucknell Hall of Fame, Class of 1981.

== Professional career ==
His professional career was spent with both the Baltimore Colts, where he was selected 207th overall in the eighth round of the 1969 NFL Draft and played for five years. He was traded to the New Orleans Saints in 1974, where he finished his career.

Sam Havrilak was inducted into the Pennsylvania State Sports Hall of Fame in November 2012.

== Personal life ==
Havrilak was a dentist who practiced in Baltimore County, Maryland. Sam and his wife Terry have one son, Michael and one granddaughter Ana Sofía. Sam is uncle to former Maryland State Delegate Eric Bromwell.
