= Vladimir Pettay =

Russian football referee (1973–2011)

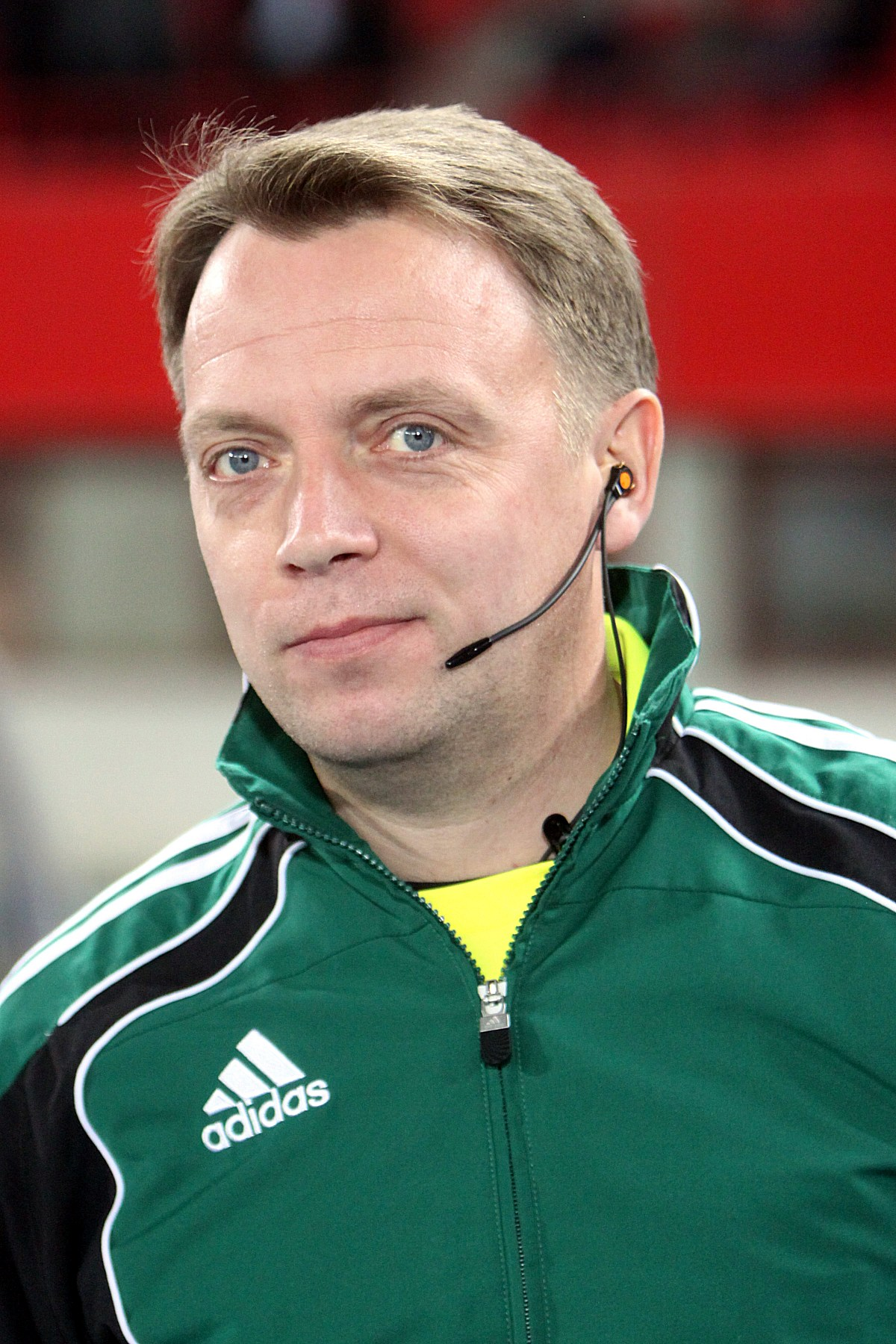
- Full name: Vladimir Leonidovich Pettay
- Born: 8 May 1973; Pudozh, Russian SFSR
- Died: 20 June 2011 (aged 38) near Petrozavodsk, Russia

Domestic
Years	League	Role
1996–2011		Referee
2003–2011	Premier League	Referee

International
Years	League	Role
2010–2011	FIFA listed	Referee

Vladimir Leonidovich Pettay (Russian: Владимир Леонидович Петтай) (8 May 1973 – 20 June 2011) was a Russian international football referee and former player.

Pettay was born in Pudozh. In 1992, he played 24 matches as a midfielder for second-league FC Karelia Petrozavodsk, scoring two goals. He later played for the first-league futsal team GTS Petrozavodsk. He began his career as a referee in 1996. He qualified as a FIFA referee in 2010 and worked in the 2011 CIS Cup.

Pettay died in the crash of RusAir Flight 9605 at Besovets, near Petrozavodsk.

== See also ==
- List of FIFA international referees
- List of sports officials who died while active
