= Bob Wortman =

American sports official (1927–2015)

Robert Vincent Wortman (December 3, 1927 – October 20, 2015) was a collegiate athlete at the University of Findlay, Ohio, where he played basketball and football. He went on to be a field judge in the American Football League from 1965 through 1969, and in the NFL starting in 1970 through 1992. He was also an NCAA college basketball referee, and the first person to officiate both in a Super Bowl (VI, 1972) and an NCAA Championship game (1976). He also officiated in Super Bowl XII. He wore number 84 for most of his Professional Football career.

== See also ==
- List of American Football League officials
