= Super Bowl V =

1971 Edition of the Super Bowl

Baltimore Colts (AFC) (11–2–1)	Dallas Cowboys (NFC) (10–4)
16	13
Head coach: Don McCafferty	Head coach: Tom Landry
	1	2	3	4	Total
BAL	0	6	0	10	16
DAL	3	10	0	0	13
- Date: January 17, 1971
- Kickoff time: 2:00 p.m. EST (UTC-5)
- Stadium: Miami Orange Bowl; Miami, Florida
- MVP: Chuck Howley, linebacker
- Favorite: Colts by 2.5
- Referee: Norm Schachter
- Attendance: 79,204

Ceremonies
- National anthem: Tommy Loy (Trumpeter)
- Coin toss: Norm Schachter
- Halftime show: Southeast Missouri State College Marching Golden Eagles Band with Anita Bryant

TV in the United States
- Network: NBC
- Announcers: Curt Gowdy, Kyle Rote and Bill Enis
- Nielsen ratings: 39.9 (est. 46 million viewers)
- Market share: 75
- Cost of 30-second commercial: $72,000

Radio in the United States
- Network: NBC Radio
- Announcers: Jay Randolph and Al DeRogatis

Super Bowl V was an American football game played between the American Football Conference (AFC) champion Baltimore Colts and the National Football Conference (NFC) champion Dallas Cowboys to determine the National Football League (NFL) champion for the 1970 season. It was the fifth edition of the Super Bowl and the first modern-era NFL championship game. The Colts defeated the Cowboys by the score of 16–13 on a field goal with 5 seconds left in the game to win their first Super Bowl and first NFL championship since 1959. The game was played on January 17, 1971, at the Orange Bowl in Miami, Florida, and was the first Super Bowl game played on artificial turf; specifically, the game was played on a Poly-Turf surface.

The game was the first Super Bowl played after the completion of the AFL–NFL merger. Beginning with this game and continuing to the present day, the Super Bowl has served as the NFL's championship game, with the winner of the AFC Championship Game and the winner of the NFC Championship Game facing off in the culmination of the NFL playoffs. As per the merger agreement, all 26 AFL and NFL teams were divided into two conferences with 13 teams in each. Along with the Colts, the Cleveland Browns and Pittsburgh Steelers agreed to join the ten AFL teams to form the AFC; the remaining 13 NFL teams formed the NFC. This explains why the Colts represented the NFL in Super Bowl III, but the AFC for Super Bowl V. Baltimore advanced to Super Bowl V after posting an 11–2–1 regular season record. Meanwhile, the Cowboys were making their first Super Bowl appearance after posting a 10–4 regular season record.

The game is often referred to as the "Blunder Bowl," "Blooper Bowl," or "Stupor Bowl" due to it being marred with poor play, a blocked PAT, missed opportunities, penalties, turnovers, and officiating miscues. The two teams combined for a Super Bowl record 11 turnovers, with five solely in the fourth quarter. The Colts' seven turnovers remain the most committed by a Super Bowl champion. Dallas also set a Super Bowl record with 10 penalties, costing them 133 yards. It was finally settled when Colts rookie kicker Jim O'Brien made a 32-yard field goal with five seconds left in regulation time, then a Super Bowl record for least time in the lead for a champion. Baltimore overcame a 13–6 deficit after three quarters and the loss of its starting quarterback Johnny Unitas to an injury in the second quarter. To date, the game is the only Super Bowl in which the Most Valuable Player Award was given to a member of the losing team: Cowboys' linebacker Chuck Howley, the first non-quarterback to win the award, after making two interceptions (sacks and tackles were not yet recorded).

Due to its blunders, the game is often regarded among the worst Super Bowls ever played, but is also recognized as the title the Colts needed after losing Super Bowl III.

== Background ==
=== Host selection process ===
The NFL awarded Super Bowl V to Miami on March 17, 1970, at the owners' meeting held in Honolulu. It marked the third Super Bowl to be played in the Orange Bowl. Three cities submitted bids: Miami, New Orleans, and Los Angeles (Coliseum). A potential bid by Pasadena (Rose Bowl) failed to materialize, and Houston (Astrodome) dropped out due to scheduling conflicts with conventions.

=== Baltimore Colts ===
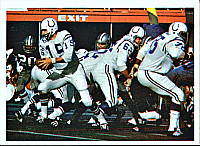
Earl Morrall (with ball) running a play during Super Bowl V

The Colts were an unspectacular but well-balanced veteran team, led by 37-year-old star quarterback Johnny Unitas. He had regained his starting spot on the team in 1969 upon recovering from an injury that led him to miss the majority of the 1968 season. Unitas played inconsistently during the 1970 regular season; he threw for 2,213 yards, but recorded more interceptions than touchdowns. He also had injury problems, missing two regular season games and giving Earl Morrall more significant playing time. Morrall put up better statistics (792 yards, 9 touchdowns, 4 interceptions, and a 97.6 passer rating), but head coach Don McCafferty decided to start Unitas for the playoffs. (According to Jim O'Brien, Morrall was just as good as Unitas in the players' opinion.)

In addition, Baltimore had three solid weapons in the passing game: wide receivers Eddie Hinton and Roy Jefferson, and future Hall of Fame tight end John Mackey combined for 119 receptions, 1,917 yards, and 15 touchdowns. In the backfield, running back Norm Bulaich was the team's top rusher with 426 yards and 3 touchdowns, while also catching 11 passes for another 123 yards.

The Colts' main strength was their defense. Pro Bowl defensive tackle Bubba Smith anchored the line. Behind him, the Colts had two outstanding linebackers: Pro Bowler Mike Curtis, who recorded 5 interceptions, and Ted Hendricks. In the secondary, Pro Bowl safety Jerry Logan recorded 6 interceptions for 92 return yards and 2 touchdowns, while safety Rick Volk had 4 interceptions for 61 return yards.

Don Klosterman, formerly with San Diego, Kansas City, and Houston in the AFL, became the Colts' general manager in 1970. Future Colts GM Ernie Accorsi was the public relations director.

Baltimore finished the regular season winning the AFC East with an 11–2–1 record, the best in the AFC. Only the Minnesota Vikings had a better record among all NFL teams at 12–2.

=== Dallas Cowboys ===
The Cowboys overcame many obstacles during the regular season. Running back Calvin Hill, the team's second leading rusher with 577 yards and four touchdowns, was lost for the year after suffering a leg injury late in the regular season. Wide receiver Bob Hayes was also benched by head coach Tom Landry for poor performances on several occasions.

Most significantly, the Cowboys had a quarterback controversy between Craig Morton and Roger Staubach; the two alternated as starters during the regular season. Landry eventually settled on Morton for most of the latter half of the season, because he felt less confident that Staubach would follow his game plan (Landry called all of Morton's plays). Morton had also done well in the regular season, throwing for 1,819 yards and 15 touchdowns, with only seven interceptions, earning him a passer rating of 89.8. In contrast, Staubach, although a noted scrambler and able to salvage broken plays effectively, threw for 542 yards, and only two touchdowns with eight interceptions, giving him a 42.9 rating.

Hayes was the main deep threat on the team, catching 34 passes for 889 yards (a 26.1 yards per catch average) and ten touchdowns, while also rushing four times for 34 yards and another touchdown, and adding another 116 yards returning punts. On the other side of the field, wide receiver Lance Rentzel (who would be deactivated for the last few weeks of the season and postseason following an indecent exposure charge; being replaced in the starting lineup by Reggie Rucker) recorded 28 receptions for 556 yards and 5 touchdowns.

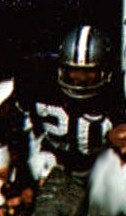
Mel Renfro was a key part of the Cowboys' famed "Doomsday Defense"

However, the main strength on the Cowboys offense was their running game. Rookie running back Duane Thomas rushed 151 times for 803 yards (a 5.1 yards per carry average) and five touchdowns, while adding another 416 yards returning kickoffs. Fullback Walt Garrison, who replaced the injured Hill, provided Thomas with excellent blocking and rushed for 507 yards and three touchdowns. Garrison was also a good receiver out of the backfield, catching 21 passes for 205 yards and 2 touchdowns. Up front, Pro Bowl guard John Niland and Hall of Famer Rayfield Wright anchored the offensive line.

Like the Colts, the Cowboys' main strength was their defense. Nicknamed the "Doomsday Defense", they allowed just one touchdown in their last six games prior to the Super Bowl. Their line was anchored by Hall of Fame defensive tackle Bob Lilly. Behind him, linebackers Lee Roy Jordan, Dave Edwards, and Hall of Famer Chuck Howley excelled at stopping the run and pass coverage. The Cowboys had an outstanding secondary, led by the Hall of Fame tandem of Mel Renfro and Herb Adderley, who combined for seven interceptions. Dallas also had two rookie safeties: Hall of Famer Cliff Harris and Charlie Waters, who led the team with five interceptions, while Harris recorded two.

Dallas finished the regular season winning the NFC East with a 10–4 record, winning their final five regular season games to overcome the St. Louis Cardinals (who lost their final three games and fell to third place in the final standings) and New York Giants (who lost their finale 31–3 to the Los Angeles Rams; a Giants victory would have given New York the NFC East title based upon a better division record and forced a coin toss between the Cowboys and Detroit Lions for the wild card playoff spot).

=== Playoffs ===
The Cowboys began their playoff run at home, defeating the Detroit Lions 5–0 at the Cotton Bowl, needing only a field goal and a safety to advance. One week later, Dallas squared off against the San Francisco 49ers in the first-ever NFC Championship Game. Aided by Thomas' 143 rushing yards and key interceptions by Renfro and Jordan late in the third quarter (both of which were converted into touchdowns), the Cowboys held off the 49ers 17–10 to advance to the Super Bowl for the first time.

Meanwhile in the AFC bracket, Baltimore began their playoff run by defeating the Cincinnati Bengals 17–0 in a game in which Unitas would only complete 6 passes, but two of them being crucial touchdown passes, for the victory. The next week, Baltimore would play the Oakland Raiders in the first AFC Championship Game. The Colts defeated the Raiders 27–17 off the strength of strong defensive play, with Raiders quarterback Daryle Lamonica being intercepted three times. With the win, the Colts advanced to their second Super Bowl.

=== Super Bowl pregame news and notes ===
Super Bowl V provided both teams with an opportunity to shake off prior shortcomings. For the Colts, the game represented a chance to redeem themselves for their humiliating loss to the New York Jets in Super Bowl III. Volk commented, "Going to the game a second time took away some of the awe. I think we were able to focus better. There was no way we were going to let ourselves get beat again." Further pressure was on the Colts as the Baltimore Orioles achieved redemption of their own four months earlier, beating the Cincinnati Reds in the World Series after falling to the New York Mets a year earlier.

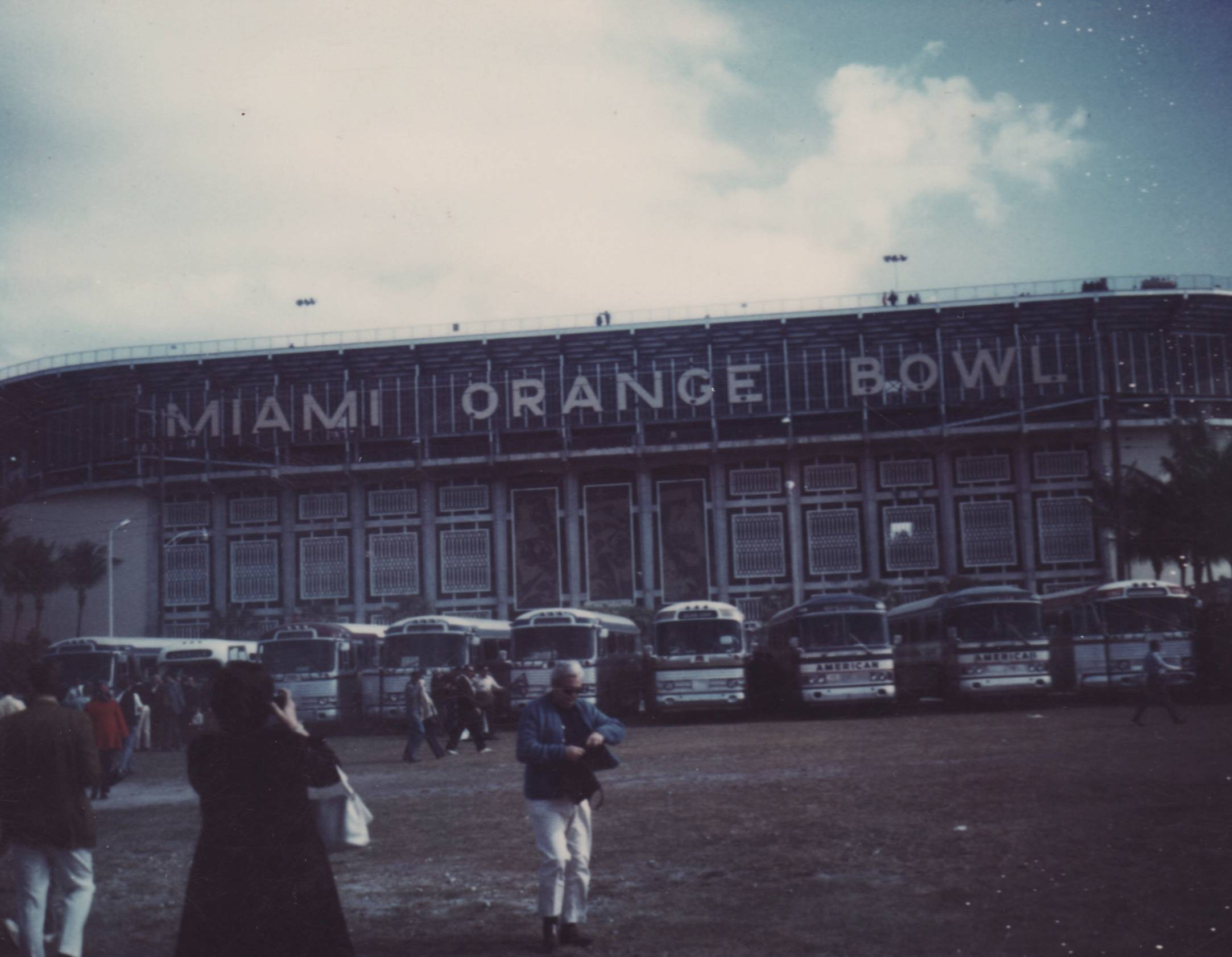
The Miami Orange Bowl during Super Bowl V

Meanwhile, the game was a chance for the Cowboys to lose their nickname of "next year's champions" and their reputation of "not being able to win the big games". Although Dallas had won more games (52) than any other team in professional football over the previous five seasons, they had yet to win a league title. In 1966 and 1967, the Cowboys had opportunities to advance to the first two Super Bowls, but narrowly lost both times to the Green Bay Packers in the NFL Championship. In the 1966 NFL Championship, the Cowboys failed to score a potential game-tying touchdown on four attempts from the Green Bay 2-yard line. One year later, in the 1967 NFL Championship (famously known as the "Ice Bowl"), the Cowboys surrendered a Packers game-winning touchdown with 16 seconds left in the game.

The Cowboys were listed as the designated home team entering the game. Under the rules in place at the time, the Cowboys were forced to wear their blue jerseys. Although they had not worn blue at home since 1963, they had worn their blue jerseys twice in 1970 (a Week 3 loss to St. Louis and a Week 13 victory over Cleveland).

Prior to kickoff, the Colts were listed as 2.5 point favorites with the over/under on combined points listed at 36.

Vice President Spiro Agnew, a Colts fan since the team began playing in Baltimore in 1953, attended the game. Agnew was Governor of Maryland prior to his election as Richard Nixon's running mate in 1968. Nixon himself was a huge football fan and had a vacation home in Key Biscayne, approximately ten miles from the Orange Bowl. Also in attendance was boxing great Muhammad Ali, who signed autographs for many young fans. Ali was in south Florida training for his March 8 heavyweight championship fight vs. Joe Frazier in New York City.

Kickoff for this game was at 2:00 pm, making it the earliest starting time in the Eastern Time Zone in Super Bowl history, and one of only three Super Bowls to start in the morning for viewers in the Pacific Time Zone (the others were Super Bowl VI in New Orleans and Super Bowl X in Miami).

== Broadcasting ==
The game was broadcast in the United States by NBC with play-by-play announcer Curt Gowdy, color commentator Kyle Rote, and sideline reporter Bill Enis.

Although the Orange Bowl was sold out for the event, unconditional blackout rules in the NFL in the era prohibited the live telecast from being shown in the Miami area (Dade, Broward and Monroe counties) as well as the West Palm Beach market (Palm Beach, Martin, Indian River, St. Luice and Okeechobee counties). (Note: WSVN aired the movies El Paso and The Raging Tide, followed by an episode of Star Trek, as filler programming; WPTV aired an episode of Sea Hunt and the movie War and Peace as filler.) Both stations aired the full broadcast on tape delay, with the pregame featuring Gowdy and Joe Namath at 11:30 p.m., followed by the game at midnight.

The blackout was challenged in Miami-Dade District Court by attorney Ellis Rubin, and although the judge denied Rubin's request since he felt he did not have the power to overrule the NFL, he agreed with Rubin's argument that the blackout rule was unnecessary for the Super Bowl. The game was also the first Super Bowl to be carried live in the state of Alaska, thanks to NBC's then-parent company RCA acquiring the Alaska Communications System from the United States Air Force.

The video of the complete original broadcast, up until Chuck Howley's second interception, the first play of the fourth quarter, exists; however, the rest of the fourth quarter is missing from network vaults. The complete audio, including the post-game, does exist. Broadcast excerpts of the crucial fourth-quarter plays, recovered from the Canadian feed of NBC's original, also exist and circulate among collectors. (Two different NFL Films game compilations also cover the fourth-quarter plays, in part.)

46.04 million people in the US watched the game on television, resulting in a rating of 39.9 and a market share of 75.

== Entertainment ==
The bands from Southern University and Southeast Missouri State College performed before the game, while trumpeter Tommy Loy played the national anthem. Loy also played the anthem before every Cowboys' home game from the mid-1960s until the late-1980s. The Southeast Missouri State Golden Eagle Band was featured during the halftime show along with singer Anita Bryant.

The game had one of the first planned jet fly-bys. The fly-by, which was supposed to happen right at the end of the national anthem, ended up coming 5 minutes after the anthem had ended.

This was the third consecutive (and final) Super Bowl to feature the Vince Lombardi Trophy on the 50-yard line. Originally the trophy was supposed to be painted gray, but the league changed it to silver which led to problems washing it out of the poly turf surface.

=== Halftime show ===
Super Bowl V halftime show
- Part of: Super Bowl V
- Date: January 17, 1971
- Location: Miami, Florida
- Venue: Miami Orange Bowl
- Headliner: Southeast Missouri State Marching Band
- Special guests: Anita Bryant

Super Bowl halftime show chronology
IV (1970)	V (1971)	VI (1972)

The Super Bowl V halftime show was headlined by the Southeast Missouri State Marching Band, with Anita Bryant as a guest. Up with People were also included as performers.

This was the third time that the Southeast Missouri State Marching Band had performed at the Miami Orange Bowl (venue of Super Bowl V), having previously performed during the halftime of the 1965 and 1969 Orange Bowl games. The band was directed by LeRoy Mason. During their stay in Miami for the game, the band was accommodated at the McAllister Hotel.

During the roughly 13-minute performance, floats representing each of the league's 26 teams were utilized. Members of two high school bands were utilized to form a geographic outline of the United States.

In the performance, Bryant, standing on a float, sang, "Battle Hymn of the Republic". The arrangement of this song was created by her musical director Charles Bird, and had been created for the band to accompany her. It had been adapted from a previous recording Bryant had done of the tune.

== Game summary ==
=== First quarter ===
The first three possessions of Super Bowl V ended quietly with each team punting after a three-and-out. On Dallas' second punt of the day, a facemask penalty gave Baltimore possession at their own 47-yard line. However, on the first play of the ensuing drive, Cowboys linebacker Chuck Howley intercepted a pass from Colts quarterback Johnny Unitas and returned it 22 yards to the Baltimore 46-yard line. This interception would be the first of 11 total turnovers committed by the two teams.

Despite the key play, the Cowboys failed to take advantage of the turnover. A 15-yard holding penalty called 10 yards behind the line of scrimmage pushed Dallas back into a 3rd-and-33 situation. On the 3rd down play, fullback Walt Garrison could only gain 11 yards, forcing the Cowboys to punt. However, Colts punt returner/cornerback Ron Gardin fumbled the return, and the loose ball was recovered by Cowboys safety Cliff Harris at the Colts' 9-yard line. Baltimore managed to keep Dallas out of the end zone, forcing them to settle for kicker Mike Clark's 14-yard field goal to establish a 3–0 lead.

Following another Colts punt, Cowboys quarterback Craig Morton began the ensuing Dallas drive by completing a 14-yard pass to running back Dan Reeves. He followed this up with a 41-yard pass to wide receiver Bob Hayes (which would ultimately be Morton's longest pass of the game) to reach the Colts' 12-yard line. On the completion to Hayes, a roughing the passer penalty on Colts defensive tackle Fred Miller added an additional 6 yards (the penalty being half the distance to the goal). For the second time however, Dallas was denied the end zone by the Baltimore defense. Linebacker Ted Hendricks deflected Morton's pass on first down, and running back Duane Thomas was tackled for a 1-yard loss on second down by cornerback Jim Duncan, ending the quarter.

=== Second quarter ===
At the start of the second quarter, Dallas now faced a third down. Morton was flagged for intentional grounding while trying to avoid a sack by defensive tackle Billy Ray Smith, pushing the Cowboys back to the 22-yard line and forcing them to settle for Clark's second field goal of the day, from 30 yards out, extending Dallas' lead to 6–0.

On the next possession, Baltimore's offense caught a lucky break. After two straight incompletions to open the drive, Unitas threw a pass to wide receiver Eddie Hinton that was both high and behind the receiver. The ball ricocheted off Hinton's hands, was tipped by Cowboys cornerback Mel Renfro, then landed in the arms of tight end John Mackey, who sprinted 75 yards for a touchdown. The touchdown catch would be the final one of Mackey's career. Despite the break, the Cowboys subsequently blocked kicker Jim O'Brien's extra point attempt to keep the score tied at 6–6. O'Brien would later remark that he was "awfully nervous" and hesitated a second too long before kicking it.

After the next three possessions ended in punts, Cowboys linebacker Lee Roy Jordan forced a Unitas fumble, and defensive tackle Jethro Pugh recovered the loose ball at the Baltimore 28-yard line. Dallas was able to capitalize on the turnover in three plays, capped off with a 7-yard touchdown pass from Morton to Thomas that gave Dallas the lead again, 13–6.

Offensive miscues continued for the Colts on their next drive. Although Unitas led them to the Cowboys' 37-yard line, he threw a costly interception while taking a fierce hit by defensive end George Andrie. On this play, Unitas was knocked out of the game entirely with a rib injury, and was replaced by backup Earl Morrall, who was widely blamed for the Colts' loss to the New York Jets in Super Bowl III.

Off the turnover, the Cowboys (starting from their own 15-yard line) were unable to score any points on the following drive. An offensive pass interference penalty on Hayes instead forced Dallas to punt. Starting from their own 48-yard line, the Colts offense, now led by Morrall, began to gain momentum. Morrall completed a 26-yard pass to Hinton, followed by a 21-yard pass to wide receiver Roy Jefferson. A personal foul penalty on Jordan put the ball on the Dallas 2-yard line with less than two minutes remaining in the half and giving Baltimore a chance to tie the game. However, the Cowboys defense stiffened. Colts running back Norm Bulaich was stopped on three consecutive rushing attempts from inside the 2-yard line. Facing a fourth down, the Colts elected to attempt a conversion, but Morrall threw a pass intended for tight end Tom Mitchell that fell incomplete, turning the ball over on downs and maintaining Dallas' 13–6 lead to end the half.

=== Third quarter ===
The second half was a parade of turnovers, sloppy plays, penalties, and missed opportunities. Baltimore's defense also held Dallas' offense scoreless for the rest of the game.

Duncan fumbled the opening kickoff while running into Cowboys running back Claxton Welch, and Dallas recovered the ball at Baltimore's 31. Then the Cowboys drove to the Colts' 2-yard line with the chance to take a two-score lead, but linebacker Mike Curtis punched the ball loose from Thomas before he could cross the goal line, and the Colts took over at their own 1 as Duncan was credited with the recovery–-a controversial call because when the resulting pile-up was sorted out, Dallas center Dave Manders was seen holding the ball. The energized Colts then drove to the Cowboys' 44-yard line, with Morrall completing a 26-yard pass to wide receiver Sam Havrilak, but came up empty when O'Brien's 52-yard field goal attempt fell short of the goal posts. However, instead of attempting to return the missed field goal, Renfro allowed it to bounce inside the Cowboys' own 1-yard line where it was downed by Colts center Tom Goode (NFL rules prior to 1974 allowed a field goal that fell short of the goal posts to be downed just like a punt; that rule is still in effect in high school football). "I thought it would carry into the end zone", Renfro explained after the game.

Dallas, backed up to their own end zone, punted after a three-and-out. The Colts would have received the ball inside Dallas territory following the punt, but a clipping penalty on Baltimore running back Jack Maitland pushed the Colts back to their own 39 to begin the drive. Two plays later, however, Morrall completed a 45-yard pass to running back Tom Nowatzke to reach the Cowboys' 15-yard line.

=== Fourth quarter ===
However, three plays later, on the first play of the fourth quarter, Morrall threw an interception to Howley in the end zone to preserve the Cowboys' 13–6 lead.

After forcing the Cowboys to punt, the Colts regained the ball on their own 18-yard line, still trailing 13–6. Aided by a pass interference penalty on Dallas safety Charlie Waters and a 23-yard pass from Morrall to Jefferson, the Colts advanced into Dallas territory. A second pass interference penalty, which was called on defensive back Cornell Green, gave the Colts a first down at the Dallas 39-yard-line. An 8-yard run by Nowatzke moved the ball to the 31-yard line. The Colts then attempted to fool the Cowboys with a flea-flicker, resulting in one of the oddest plays in Super Bowl history. Havrilak took a handoff and ran right, intending to lateral the ball back to Morrall, but Pugh stormed into the backfield and prevented him from doing so. Havrilak (who played quarterback at Bucknell University) then threw a pass intended for Mackey, but it was caught instead by Hinton, who promptly took off for the end zone. However, Green stripped Hinton from behind at the 11, and the loose ball bounced wildly into the end zone, evading recovery attempts by six different players until it was eventually pushed through the back of the end zone for a touchback, thus returning the ball to the Cowboys at their 20.

Three plays after the turnover, Morton threw a pass that was deflected by Garrison and intercepted by Colts safety Rick Volk, who returned the ball 30 yards to the Cowboys' 3-yard line before being tackled by wide receiver Reggie Rucker (Morrall later referred to that play as the play of the game). Two plays later, Nowatzke scored on a 2-yard touchdown run, tying the game at 13–13. (O'Brien says he was much calmer and more confident on this extra point than on the first one, which was blocked.)

The next two possessions ended in traded punts, with the Cowboys eventually taking over in excellent field position at the Colts 48-yard line with less than two minutes left in the game.

On the second play of this potential game-winning drive, a 15-yard holding penalty on Cowboys offensive tackle Ralph Neely on the Dallas 42-yard line, which was a spot foul, pushed the Cowboys all the way back to their own 27-yard line (the NFL did not reduce the penalty for offensive holding to 10 yards until 1974). Then, on 2nd-and-35, Morton threw a pass that slipped through the hands of Reeves and bounced for an interception into the arms of Mike Curtis, who then returned the ball 13 yards to the Cowboys' 28-yard line.

Two plays later, with nine seconds left in the game, O'Brien kicked the go ahead 32-yard field goal, giving Baltimore their first lead of the game, 16–13. O'Brien says he was "on automatic" and was so calm and concentrating so hard that he didn't hear anything and saw only the ball. After the field goal, in an enduring image, Cowboys defensive tackle Bob Lilly took off his helmet and hurled it through the air in disgust. Colts rookie linebacker Robbie Nichols returned the helmet to Lilly, who replied sheepishly "thank you, son". In the America's Game documentary highlighting the Cowboys' Super Bowl VI championship team, Lilly admitted he felt very small and regretted the helmet toss.

The Cowboys received the ball again on their own 40 with one second remaining after O'Brien's ensuing squib kick, but Morton's pass to Hayes was intercepted by safety Jerry Logan at the Baltimore 29, and the Colts were victorious.

=== Postscript ===
Morrall was the top passer of the game, with 7 out of 15 completions for 147 yards, with 1 interception. Before being knocked out of the game, Unitas completed 3 out of 9 passes for 88 yards and a touchdown, with 2 interceptions. Morton completed more passes than Morrall and Unitas combined (12), but finished the game with 118 fewer passing yards (127), and was intercepted 3 times (all in the fourth quarter). Mackey was the top receiver of the game with 2 receptions for 80 yards and a touchdown. Nowatzke was the Colts' leading rusher with 33 yards and a touchdown, while also catching a pass for 47 yards. Dallas running back Walt Garrison was the leading rusher of the game with 65 rushing yards, and added 19 yards on 2 pass receptions.

Referencing the numerous turnovers, Morrall said, "It really was a physical game. I mean, people were flying into one another out there." "It was really a hard-hitting game," wrote O'Brien. "It wasn't just guys dropping the ball. They fumbled because they got the snot knocked out of them." Said Tom Landry:

I haven't been around many games where the players hit harder. Sometimes people watch a game and see turnovers and they talk about how sloppy the play was. The mistakes in that game weren't invented, at least not by the people who made them. Most were forced.

"We figured we could win if our offense didn't put us into too many holes", said 35-year-old Colts lineman Billy Ray Smith, who was playing in his last NFL game, "Let me put it this way, they didn't put us into any holes we couldn't get out of".

Colts defensive end Bubba Smith would later refuse to wear his Super Bowl V ring because of the "sloppy" play. In a similar action, Cowboys linebacker Chuck Howley was named the Super Bowl MVP, despite being on the losing team, but Howley initially refused to accept the award because he stated that it was meaningless to him since his team lost. He reluctantly accepted the honor since it included the awarding of a brand-new station wagon that he decided to use as a gift for his wife. During the game, Howley recorded two tackles and two interceptions, one of which he returned for 22 yards.

Don McCafferty became the first rookie head coach to win a Super Bowl. The feat was not repeated until George Seifert led the San Francisco 49ers to victory in Super Bowl XXIV. McCafferty was also the first Super Bowl-winning coach who did not wear coat and tie, opting for a short-sleeved T-shirt with a mock turtleneck.

This Super Bowl would also start a trend with the team that lost the game would come back the next year and win it. Dallas lost this game but they would come back and win it all the next year in Super Bowl VI while their opponents, the Miami Dolphins, lost that game, and would go on to win Super Bowl VII the following season.

Two rule changes that were adopted before the 1974 season were:

- When the defensive team commits an illegal use of hands, arms, or body foul from behind the line of scrimmage, the penalty will be assessed from the previous spot instead of the spot of the foul.
- The penalties for offensive holding, illegal use of hands, and tripping were reduced from 15-yards to 10-yards.

These would have reduced the severity of the two Dallas offensive holding penalties in Super Bowl V.

This was the first and only Super Bowl where the Trophy presentation was done by somebody other than the commissioner, in this case, Marie Lombardi the wife of recently deceased coach Vince Lombardi. Super Bowl V also marked the debut of the newly renamed Vince Lombardi Trophy. Vince Lombardi died on September 3, 1970 and was to enter his second season as the Washington Redskins head coach.

=== Box score ===
Super Bowl V: Baltimore Colts 16, Dallas Cowboys 13

Quarter	1	2	3	4	Total
Colts (AFC)	0	6	0	10	16
Cowboys (NFC)	3	10	0	0	13

at Orange Bowl, Miami, Florida

- Date: January 17, 1971
- Game time: 2:00 p.m. EST
- Game weather: 70 °F (21 °C), clear
- Game attendance: 79,204

Scoring summary

Quarter	Time	Drive			Team	Scoring information	Score	
Quarter	Time	Plays	Yards	TOP	Team	Scoring information	BAL	DAL
1	5:32	3	2	1:40	DAL	14-yard field goal by Mike Clark	0	3
2	14:52	8	58	3:12	DAL	30-yard field goal by Clark	0	6
2	14:10	3	75	0:42	BAL	John Mackey 75-yard touchdown reception from Johnny Unitas, Jim O'Brien kick no good (blocked)	6	6
2	7:53	3	28	1:07	DAL	Duane Thomas 7-yard touchdown reception from Craig Morton, Clark kick good	6	13
4	7:35	2	3	0:35	BAL	Tom Nowatzke 2-yard touchdown run, O'Brien kick good	13	13
4	0:05	2	3	0:52	BAL	32-yard field goal by O'Brien	16	13
"TOP" = time of possession. For other American football terms, see Glossary of American football.							16	13

== Final statistics ==
Sources:The NFL's Official Encyclopedic History of Professional Football, (1973), p. 149, Macmillan Publishing Co. New York, NY, LCCN 73-3862, NFL.com Super Bowl V, Super Bowl V Play Finder Bal, Super Bowl V Play Finder Dal

=== Statistical comparison ===
	Baltimore Colts	Dallas Cowboys
First downs	14	10
First downs rushing	4	4
First downs passing	6	5
First downs penalty	4	1
Third down efficiency	3/11	1/13
Fourth down efficiency	0/1	0/0
Net yards rushing	69	102
Rushing attempts	31	31
Yards per rush	2.2	3.3
Passing – Completions/attempts	11/25	12/26
Times sacked-total yards	0–0	2–14
Interceptions thrown	3	3
Net yards passing	260	113
Total net yards	329	215
Punt returns-total yards	5–12	3–9
Kickoff returns-total yards	4–90	3–34
Interceptions-total return yards	3–57	3–22
Punts-average yardage	4–41.5	9–41.9
Fumbles-lost	5–4	1–1
Penalties-total yards	4–31	10–133
Time of possession	28:37	31:23
Turnovers	7	4

=== Individual statistics ===
Colts passing
	C/ATT^{1}	Yds	TD	INT	Rating
Johnny Unitas	3/9	88	1	2	68.1
Earl Morrall	7/15	147	0	1	54.0
Sam Havrilak	1/1	25	0	0	118.8
Colts rushing
	Car^{2}	Yds	TD	LG^{3}	Yds/Car
Tom Nowatzke	10	33	1	9	3.30
Norm Bulaich	18	28	0	8	1.56
Johnny Unitas	1	4	0	4	4.00
Sam Havrilak	1	3	0	3	3.00
Earl Morrall	1	1	0	1	1.00
Colts receiving
	Rec^{4}	Yds	TD	LG^{3}	Target^{5}
Roy Jefferson	3	52	0	23	7
John Mackey	2	80	1	75	2
Ed Hinton	2	51	0	26	7
Sam Havrilak	2	27	0	25	2
Tom Nowatzke	1	45	0	45	1
Norm Bulaich	1	5	0	5	4
Tom Mitchell	0	0	0	0	1
Ray Perkins	0	0	0	0	1

Cowboys passing
	C/ATT^{1}	Yds	TD	INT	Rating
Craig Morton	12/26	127	1	3	34.1
Cowboys rushing
	Car^{2}	Yds	TD	LG^{3}	Yds/Car
Walt Garrison	12	65	0	19	5.42
Duane Thomas	18	35	0	7	1.94
Craig Morton	1	2	0	2	2.00
Cowboys receiving
	Rec^{4}	Yds	TD	LG^{3}	Target^{5}
Dan Reeves	5	46	0	17	6
Duane Thomas	4	21	1	7	5
Walt Garrison	2	19	0	14	6
Bob Hayes	1	41	0	41	4
Mike Ditka	0	0	0	0	1
Reggie Rucker	0	0	0	0	1

^{1}Completions/attempts ^{2}Carries ^{3}Long gain ^{4}Receptions ^{5}Times targeted

=== Records set ===
The following records were set or tied in Super Bowl V, according to the official NFL.com boxscore, the 2016 NFL Record & Fact Book and the ProFootball reference.com game summary. Some records have to meet a required minimum number of attempts in order to be recognized. The minimums are shown (in parentheses).

Player records in Super Bowl V
Longest scoring play	75-yard pass	John Mackey (Baltimore)
Longest reception	75 yards	John Mackey (Baltimore)
Longest touchdown reception	75 yards	John Mackey (Baltimore)
Longest pass	75 yards (TD)	Johnny Unitas (Baltimore)
Most interceptions thrown, career	4	Earl Morrall (Baltimore)
Special teams
Most kickoff return yards, game	90	Jim Duncan (Baltimore)
Most kickoff return yards, career	90	Jim Duncan (Baltimore)
Highest kickoff return average, game (3 returns)	22.5 yards (4–90)	Jim Duncan (Baltimore)
Highest kickoff return average, career (4 returns)	22.5 yards (4–90)	Jim Duncan (Baltimore)
Most punts, game	9	Ron Widby (Dallas)
Most fair catches, game	3	Ron Gardin (Baltimore)
Records tied
Most interceptions thrown, game	3	Craig Morton (Dallas)
Most interceptions, game	2	Chuck Howley (Dallas)
Most interceptions, career	2	Chuck Howley (Dallas)
Most kickoff returns, game	4	Jim Duncan
Most kickoff returns, career	4	Jim Duncan
Most fumbles, game Most fumbles, career	1	Ron Gardin; Johnny Unitas; Jim Duncan; Eddie Hinton; Earl Morrall (Baltimore)
Most fumbles, game Most fumbles, career	1	Duane Thomas (Dallas)
Most fumbles recovered, game Most fumbles recovered, career	1	Earl Morrall; Jim Duncan
Most fumbles recovered, game Most fumbles recovered, career	1	Cliff Harris; Jethro Pugh; Richmond Flowers (Dallas)

Team records set
Points
Smallest margin of victory	3 points	Colts
Most points, fourth quarter	10	Colts
Net yards
Fewest net yards, rushing and passing	215	Cowboys
Rushing
Lowest average gain per rush attempt	2.2 yards	Colts (69–31)
Passing
Fewest passes completed	11	Colts
Most yards passing (net)	260	Colts
Fewest yards passing (net)	113	Cowboys
Highest average yards gained per pass attempt	10.4	Colts (260–25)
Lowest average yards gained per pass attempt	4.3	Cowboys (113–26)
First downs
Fewest first downs	10	Cowboys
Fewest first downs passing	5	Cowboys
Most first downs, penalty	4	Colts
Defense
Fewest yards allowed	215	Colts
Fumbles
Most fumbles, game	5	Colts
Most fumbles lost, game	4	Colts
Most fumbles recovered, game	4	Cowboys
Turnovers
Most turnovers, game	7	Colts
Punting
Most punts, game	9	Cowboys
Penalties
Most penalties, game	10	Cowboys
Most yards penalized, game	133	Cowboys
Team records tied
Most Super Bowl appearances	2	Colts
Fewest times sacked	0	Colts
Most punt returns, game	5	Colts
Most Super Bowl losses	1	Cowboys
Fewest points, second half	0	Cowboys
Fewest touchdowns, game	1	Cowboys
Fewest rushing touchdowns	0	Cowboys
Fewest sacks made	0	Cowboys

Turnovers are defined as the number of times losing the ball on interceptions and fumbles.

Records, both team totals
	Total	Colts	Cowboys
Fewest points scored, second half	10	10	0
Fewest rushing yards (net)	171	69	102
Fewest passes completed	23	11	12
Most times intercepted	6	3	3
Most interceptions by	6	3	3
Most fumbles	6	5	1
Most fumbles lost	5	4	1
Most turnovers	11	7	4
Most punts, game	13	4	9
Most penalties, game	14	4	10
Most yards penalized	164	31	133
First downs, both teams
Fewest first downs	24	14	10
Fewest first downs rushing	8	4	4
Fewest first downs, passing	11	6	5
Most first downs, penalty	5	4	1
Records tied, both team totals
Fewest (one point) extra points	2	(1–2)	(1–1)
Fewest rushing touchdowns	1	1	0
Fewest times sacked	2	0	2
Fewest sacks made	2	2	0

== Starting lineups ==
Hall of Fame‡

Baltimore	Position	Dallas
Offense
Eddie Hinton	WR	Bob Hayes‡
Bob Vogel	LT	Ralph Neely
Glenn Ressler	LG	John Niland
Bill Curry	C	Dave Manders
John Williams	RG	Blaine Nye
Dan Sullivan	RT	Rayfield Wright‡
John Mackey‡	TE	Pettis Norman
Roy Jefferson	WR	Reggie Rucker
Johnny Unitas‡	QB	Craig Morton
Norm Bulaich	RB	Duane Thomas
Tom Nowatzke	RB	Walt Garrison
Defense
Bubba Smith	LE	Larry Cole
Billy Ray Smith	LT	Jethro Pugh
Fred Miller	RT	Bob Lilly‡
Roy Hilton	RE	George Andrie
Ray May	LLB	Dave Edwards
Mike Curtis	MLB	Lee Roy Jordan
Ted Hendricks‡	RLB	Chuck Howley‡
Charlie Stukes	LCB	Herb Adderley‡
Jim Duncan	RCB	Mel Renfro‡
Jerry Logan	LS	Cornell Green
Rick Volk	RS	Charlie Waters

== Officials ==
- Referee: Norm Schachter #56 second Super Bowl (I)
- Umpire: Paul Trepinski #22 first Super Bowl
- Head linesman: Ed Marion #26 first Super Bowl
- Line judge: Jack Fette #39 first Super Bowl
- Back judge: Hugh Gamber #70 first Super Bowl
- Field judge: Fritz Graf #34 first Super Bowl
- Alternate referee: Jack Reader #42 worked Super Bowls I and III as a back judge. Named NFL Assistant Director of Officiating in 1974.
- Alternate umpire: Pat Harder #88 never had an on-field assignment in a Super Bowl. Alternate umpire for Super Bowl XVI

Note: A seven-official system was not used until 1978, also back judge and field swapped titles in 1998.
