= Alexander Salton =

Australian rules footballer and umpire

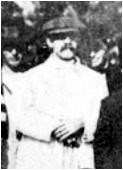
- Salton in 1915

Personal information
- Full name: Alexander Salton
- Born: 1869; Richmond, Victoria
- Died: 10 September 1916 (aged 47); Estaires, France

Playing career^{1}
Years	Club	Games (Goals)
1886–1892	Richmond (VFA)	25 (7)
- ^{1} Playing statistics correct to the end of 1892.

Alexander Salton (1869 – 10 September 1916) was an Australian rules football goal umpire in the Victorian Football League.

Alexander Salton played football for Richmond Football Club in the 1880s and 1890s, long prior to their admission to the VFL. When he enlisted in the AIF on 6 August 1915 he was 45 years old. The following day he umpired his only Richmond match and a fortnight later his last VFL match before entering camp at Broadmeadows. Originally allocated to the 12th reinforcements of the 6th Battalion he left Australia aboard HMAT Ceramic on 23 November 1915.

On arrival in Egypt he suffered from varicose veins leading to a month in hospital. This period coincided with the reorganisation of the AIF and when Salton was returned to duty he was transferred to the newly formed 60th Battalion. Another minor bout of varicose veins preceded his embarkation to France. As a result, rather than joining the full battalion, he was placed in the 15th Training Battalion and then at the 5th Divisional Base Depot after he arrived at Marseilles on 30 June 1916. This transfer meant that Salton was not present at the Battle of Fromelles on 19 July. That action resulted in the virtual destruction of the 60th Battalion. They suffered 757 casualties from a pre-action strength of 887.

On 29 August Salton eventually joined the battalion as reinforcement for the massive battle losses. Straightaway he was in the front line in the Fromelles area. The hazards of trench warfare were ever present. Shrapnel and high-explosive shells, snipers and trench raids all occurred in the short time Salton survived.

Five days after arriving Salton was mortally wounded. Shot in the stomach, he was evacuated through the 14th Field Ambulance to the 1st Australian Casualty Clearing Station where he clung to life for six days before dying of his wounds on 10 September.

Salton was buried at Estaires Communal Cemetery in France. All that remained was returned to his wife: his two identity discs and metal pencil case. At least, that was, until many years later when Richmond Football Club historian, Rhett Bartlett, came across a gold locket inscribed 'For Services Rendered. A. Salton. 1887' in a Hawthorn antique shop. It had been presented at the club Annual General Meeting and remains a link to the only VFL umpire to have died in military service of his nation.
