= Al Conway =

American football player (1930–2012)

Alfred Joseph Conway
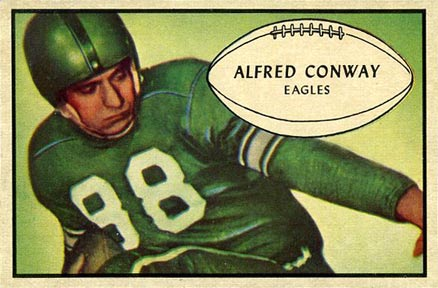
- Conway on a 1953 Bowman football card

Personal information
- Born: March 16, 1930; Avondale, Missouri, U.S.
- Died: August 3, 2012 (aged 82)

Career information
- College: Army
- NFL draft: 1953: 2nd round, 20; By the (Philadelphia Eagles)th overall pick

Alfred Joseph Conway (March 16, 1930 – August 3, 2012) was an American football official for 28 seasons. He worked in the American Football League (AFL) in its last year, 1969, and in the National Football League (NFL) from 1970 to 1996. Over the course of his career in professional football, Conway officiated 31 playoff games, including four Super Bowls—Super Bowl IX in 1975, Super Bowl XIV in 1980, Super Bowl XVI in 1982, and Super Bowl XXII in 1988. On the field, he wore uniform number 27.

As a student at North Kansas City High School, Conway excelled in football, track and field, basketball, and baseball. Upon graduating, Conway was considered by many to be the best running back in football in the Kansas City metropolitan area and perhaps in the entire state as a senior and one of the best athletes of all time to hail from Missouri. After high school, Conway was recruited to play football for coach Earl Blaik at the United States Military Academy. He participated in track and field as well, but finished his final year of college at William Jewell College in Liberty, Missouri.

After finishing college, Conway was selected 20th overall in the second round by the Philadelphia Eagles in the 1953 NFL draft, but had his career ended early due to a string of injuries. Staying close to the sport he enjoyed the most, Conway took up officiating and joined the AFL in 1969 as an umpire. Later, where he worked several seasons in the NFL on the crew of highly regarded referee Pat Haggerty. After retiring as an official following the 1996 NFL season, Conway became involved in training newly hired umpires and also serves as an observer for the NFL.

Conway and his wife, Bev, resided in Branson, Missouri. Conway had five children with his first wife Sue, who preceded him in death, Mike, Susie, Jim, Patty, and David.

== See also ==
- List of American Football League officials
