= Jack Reader =

American football player and official (1925–2008)

John Kenneth Reader
- Born: November 11, 1925; Lawrence, Massachusetts, U.S.
- Died: November 10, 2008; Hingham, Massachusetts, U.S.
- Education: College of the Holy Cross
- Occupation(s): Football player, Referee
- Years active: 1960–1974, 2001–2006

John Kenneth Reader (November 11, 1925 – November 10, 2008) was an American football official.

== Biography ==
Reader was born in Lawrence, Massachusetts, and served in the U.S. Army Air Corps during World War II. He attended the College of the Holy Cross, where he starred on the Holy Cross Crusaders football team. After graduating in 1950, Reader became an on-field official. In 1960, he joined the American Football League and officiated its first game, between the Denver Broncos and the Boston Patriots on September 9, 1960. He was one of only nine men who officiated in the AFL for its entire ten-year existence, 1960 through 1969. After the 1970 merger of the NFL with the AFL, he continued working as a referee until he retired after the 1973 season and became an officiating supervisor in the NFL, retiring shortly before his death. A 1996 inductee to the Central Catholic High of Lawrence Hall of Fame, Reader was part of some of the most historic moments of the American Football League.

Reader was also a back judge at Super Bowl I (1967) and III (1969), when those games were the World Championships between the AFL and NFL champions. He was shown in an iconic image in the January 20, 1969, issue of Sports Illustrated, wearing number 42, with his arms raised signaling a New York Jets touchdown by fullback Matt Snell during the AFL champions' 16–7 win over the NFL champion Baltimore Colts in Super Bowl III. Reader died of cancer on November 10, 2008, one day before his 83rd birthday, in Hingham, Massachusetts.

== See also ==
- List of American Football League officials
