= Sonny Gamber =

American referee and basketball player (1916–2006)

Personal information
- Born: October 22, 1916 Davenport, Iowa, U.S.
- Died: March 26, 2006 (aged 89) Clearwater, Florida, U.S.
- Listed height: 5 ft 9 in (1.75 m)
- Listed weight: 160 lb (73 kg)

Career information
- High school: Davenport (Davenport, Iowa)
- College: University of Dubuque (1937–1938)

Career history
- 1935–1937: Davenport Central Turners
- 1938–1941: Davenport Rockets
- 1945–1947: Davenport Rockets

Hugo Ralph "Sonny" Gamber (October 22, 1916 – March 26, 2006) was an American referee and basketball player. He starred at Davenport High School where he was selected to two Iowa All-State high school basketball teams. After graduating from high school, he played for the Davenport Central Turners. He then played college basketball for the University of Dubuque before going on to play professionally for the Davenport Central Turner Rockets. He played for the team during the 1941 World Professional Basketball Tournament, where he led the team in scoring in its first round loss against the Chicago Bruins. Following his stint in the military during World War II, Gamber continued to play for the Rockets in the late 1940s.

Following his playing career, he became a basketball and football referee. He started with high school basketball games, before moving on to the Missouri Valley Conference and the National Basketball Association. In 1960, he became an official in newly formed American Football League. In 1968, he was part of the officiating crew of the infamous "Heidi game" between he Oakland Raiders and the New York Jets, where the game's television broadcaster (NBC) broke away from its coverage on the East Coast to broadcast the television film Heidi which caused many viewers to miss the Raiders' comeback where they scored two touchdowns in the final minute to win the game 43–32. He went on to officiate ten conference championship games and was part of the officiating crew in Super Bowl V. He retired from officiating in 1976.

Gamber died in Clearwater, Florida in 2006.
