= James Barnhill (basketball) =

American football official and basketball referee

James Bernard Barnhill (February 5, 1921 – March 11, 1966) was an on-field official in several sports, including professional American football with the American Football League (AFL) for it first six seasons, from 1960 through 1965. He was a member of the AFL's officiating crew from its inception and served as the referee in the league's first championship game, played between the Houston Oilers and the Los Angeles Chargers in Houston on January 1, 1961. Barnhill was related to Sean Combs. He also officiated college football and college basketball games in the College Conference of Illinois and the Big Ten Conference. In boxing, he was a president and chairman of the Golden Gloves Association of America.

A newspaperman, Barnhill was the managing editor of the Kenosha News in southeastern Wisconsin, and its former sports editor. He was the referee in the 1965 AFL championship game and died less than eleven weeks later. Barnhill, age 45, collapsed while officiating a high school basketball sectional playoff game in Brookfield, a suburb west of Milwaukee, and was taken to Waukesha Memorial Hospital, where he was pronounced dead. He left a wife and seven children.

== See also ==
- List of American Football League officials
