= Jack Vest =

American football official (1926–1972)

Jack Douglas Vest (September 16, 1926 – June 2, 1972) was an American athlete, sports coach, and official. He was a 12-letter man at East Tennessee State University, winning honors in football, basketball, and baseball between 1946 and 1950. He is also to be found numerous times in the Buccaneer record book. He was an outstanding quarterback in football and averaged between 15 and 20 points per season in basketball. A gifted passer, Vest held the Buccaneer record for most passes completed in a single game for years. He was a member of the All-Decade 1940s team as a quarterback and figured prominently in some of the better teams fielded by coach Loyd T. Roberts. Vest is a member of the East Tennessee State Athletic Hall of Fame.

After leaving East Tennessee State, Vest coached high school football and turned out a 9–0–1 record with a St. Paul, Virginia team which had only 17 players on the entire squad. He coached at Greeneville High School in Greeneville, Tennessee from 1951 to 1953.

After coaching football at Hanes High School in Winston-Salem, North Carolina, he became an executive in the insurance department of Wachovia and devoted much time to officiating. Vest official games in the Southern Conference and the Atlantic Coast Conference and worked in the Gator Bowl as a football official in 1964. For six years in a row he was an official in the National Association of Intercollegiate Athletics (NAIA) national championships in Kansas City.

In 1965, he became an official in the American Football League (AFL). He was the referee for Super Bowl II between the Green Bay Packers and the Oakland Raiders.

He wore uniform number 3 as a referee in the National Football League (NFL) during the 1970 and 1971 seasons. During a Monday Night Football game between the New York Giants and Philadelphia Eagles in November 1970, Vest wore bright blue gloves which were easily visible to the television audience. The NFL soon passed a rule all officials' gloves had to be black. That game is more memorable, however, for the antics in the broadcast booth, where Howard Cosell threw up on Don Meredith's boots and had to leave Franklin Field at halftime.

Vest worked the 1970 AFC divisional playoff game between the Cincinnati Bengals and Baltimore Colts, and the 1971 AFC Championship Game between the Colts and Miami Dolphins. His crew for the 1971 season included umpire Frank Sinkovitz, head linesman Leo Miles, line judge Bruce Alford, back judge John Steffen, and field judge Tony Skover. Steffen replaced Bob Frederic from Vest's 1970 crew when Frederic was promoted to referee for 1971 to replace the retired Bob Finley.

In June 1972 Vest was killed in a motorcycle accident at Myrtle Beach, South Carolina. Chuck Heberling was promoted from line judge to replace Vest as referee, and the remainder of Vest's crew worked with Heberling during the 1972 and 1973 seasons. Heberling's line judge position was filled by Red Cashion.

== See also ==
- List of American Football League officials
