= Cal Lepore =

American football official (1919–2002)

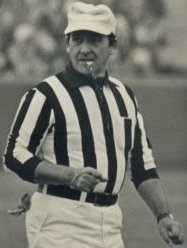
- Born: Leonard Charles Lepore; April 15, 1919; Chicago, Illinois, U.S.
- Died: December 7, 2002 (aged 83)
- Occupation: American football official
- Employer(s): American Football League (1966–1969); National Football League (1970–1980)

Leonard Charles "Cal" Lepore (April 15, 1919 – December 7, 2002) was an American football head linesman, line judge and referee. He officiated in the American Football League (AFL) from 1966 through 1969, and then in the National Football League (NFL) from 1970 through 1980. He worked as the line judge in Super Bowl III, won by the New York Jets over the Baltimore Colts, after the 1968 season. He was the alternate referee for Super Bowl XII and the replay official in Super Bowl XXVI. Lepore wore no. 72 for most of his NFL career (he wore no. 5 in his final two seasons, when each position was numbered separately). He was the supervisor of officials in the United States Football League (USFL) and the World League of American Football, later named NFL Europe.

Lepore is credited with promulgating the use of instant replay as an officiating tool, as well as urging the use of coaches' challenges in professional football. The NFL adopted nearly all of the components of the Replay Rule he authored and first administered in mid-1980s in the USFL. Referee Magazine has considered him one of the most influential officials in the history of sports. Lepore was also the referee of the "Miracle at the Meadowlands" on November 19, 1978.

Lepore was born in Chicago and attended Harper High School there. He then played professional baseball; his 1940 draft registration card listed his employer as the Chicago White Sox, and Baseball-Reference.com has record of him playing for the minor league Jonesboro White Sox during the 1941 season as a second baseman. Lepore served in the United States Army during World War II. He was married and had three surviving children.

== See also ==
- List of American Football League officials
