= Frank Sinkovitz =

American football player and official (1923–1989)

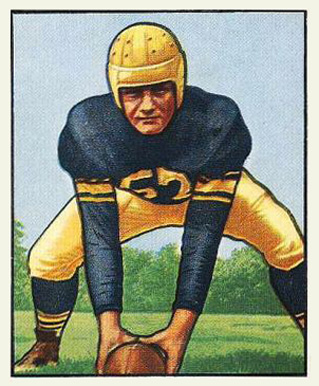

Profile
- Position: Center; Linebacker

Personal information
- Born: May 20, 1923; Steelton, Pennsylvania, U.S.
- Died: August 6, 1989 (aged 66); Baltimore, Maryland, U.S.

Career information
- College: Duke

Career history
- 1947–1952: Pittsburgh Steelers
- 1958–1983: NFL Umpire
- Stats at Pro Football Reference

Frank Bernard Sinkovitz (May 20, 1923 – August 6, 1989) was an American football center and linebacker who played six seasons in the National Football League (NFL). He then worked as an umpire for 26 seasons (1958–83), wearing uniform number 20, which was later worn by Larry Nemmers and Barry Anderson. He officiated Super Bowl XV, and also worked the final five seasons of his career on the crew headed by referee Jerry Seeman, who later served as NFL Vice President of Officiating from 1991 to 2001. Prior to serving on Seeman's crew, Sinkovitz was a member of crews headed by Jack Vest (1970-71), Chuck Heberling (1972-75) and Don Wedge (1976-78).

Sinkovitz was the last active official who started his career prior to the formation of the American Football League in 1960.

His final NFL game was on December 18, 1983, a 20-10 win by the Baltimore Colts vs. the Houston Oilers at Memorial Stadium. It turned out to be the Colts' last game in Baltimore; three months later, the franchise loaded equipment, legal documents and office furniture into 15 Mayflower moving vans, which transported the cargo from Maryland to their new home in Indianapolis.

He was born in Steelton, Pennsylvania and died in Baltimore, Maryland.
