= Ben Dreith =

American football official (1925–2021)

- Born: February 1, 1925; Denver, Colorado, U.S.
- Died: April 25, 2021 (aged 96); Centennial, Colorado, U.S.
- Education: University of Northern Colorado (Bachelor's degree, 1950)
- Occupations: AFL official (1960–1969); NFL official (1970–1990)

Ben Dreith (February 1, 1925 – April 25, 2021) was an American professional football on-field official who worked from 1960 to 1969 in the American Football League (AFL) and from 1970 to 1990 in the National Football League (NFL). Prior to his teaching and officiating career, he was a three-sport athlete at the University of Northern Colorado.

Dreith developed a reputation as a no-nonsense, tough-minded official. During his 30-year career, he officiated two Super Bowls and received a playoff assignment for 28 consecutive years.

== College ==
Dreith was a 1950 graduate of the University of Northern Colorado in Greeley (then known as the Colorado State College of Education), where he played baseball, basketball and football. He was a four-time all-conference selection in baseball and two-time selection in basketball, and later worked as a teacher for the Denver Public Schools.

== Officiating career ==
Dreith was hired by the new AFL in 1960 and moved to the NFL in 1970 following the AFL–NFL merger. He was the referee for Super Bowl VIII and Super Bowl XV and was an alternate official for Super Bowl II. He was assigned to eight conference-championship games.

Dreith called a highly controversial penalty on Ray "Sugar Bear" Hamilton of the New England Patriots during a 1976 AFC divisional playoff game against the Oakland Raiders. Dreith flagged Hamilton with less than one minute remaining in the game for roughing quarterback Ken Stabler on a 3rd-and-18 incompletion, giving the Raiders a first down to sustain their game-winning drive.

In a late-season 1983 game between the Steelers and Browns, Dreith ejected Jack Lambert for a late hit on Brian Sipe in Sipe's final NFL game.

Dreith is known among football fans for his unique explanation of a personal-foul penalty during a 1986 game between the Buffalo Bills and the New York Jets. After the Jets' Marty Lyons (misidentified as Mark Gastineau during Dreith's call) tackled Bills quarterback Jim Kelly to the ground and repeatedly punched Kelly in the head, Dreith announced to the crowd: "There's a personal foul on number 99 (Lyons actually wore 93) of the defense—after he tackled the quarterback, he's givin' him the business down there, that's a 15-yard penalty." Dreith's call also involved an improvised hand signal of a repeated punching action. On November 24, 2007, during a game between University of Maryland and North Carolina State University, ACC referee Ron Cherry called a personal foul, saying, "He was giving him the business." Cherry did not use Dreith's hand signal. David Letterman stated that he wanted the previous sentence to be a topic for "Know Your Current Events."

=== Age-discrimination lawsuit ===
By 1990, Dreith reached the age of 65 and the league asked him to move into the instant replay booth. He refused and was demoted to line judge. Dreith was fired after the season, thus prompting him to send a complaint to the Equal Employment Opportunity Commission (EEOC).

On February 13, 1991, the EEOC ruled that the NFL had violated the Age Discrimination in Employment Act by illegally demoting Dreith. After attempts to reach a compromise with the league, the EEOC sued the NFL on August 13. In the first-ever lawsuit filed by the agency against a professional football league for age discrimination, the EEOC claimed that the NFL unfairly reviewed the job performance of older referees more closely than that of younger officials. The EEOC also noted that the league's performance ratings showed that Dreith performed better than some of the younger officials who were retained.

On January 5, 1993, Dreith and the NFL agreed to a $165,000 settlement plus court costs and attorneys' fees.

== Death ==
Dreith died on April 25, 2021, at age 96.

== See also ==
- List of American Football League officials
