= Maia Chaka =

First black female on-field official hired by the NFL

Maia Chaka (born 1981 or 1982 (age 43–44)) is a former official in the National Football League (NFL). She wore uniform number 100. She was the first black woman hired by the NFL as an on-field official. The native of Rochester, New York became the league's third female on-field official after Shannon Eastin and Sarah Thomas.

== Officiating career ==
Chaka began officiating in 2007 at high school football games in Virginia. By 2009, she officiated the Virginia State High School Championship Game hosted in Charlottesville, Virginia, at UVA Scott Stadium on the campus of the University of Virginia. In 2011, she began officiating Division I football with Conference USA. Chaka served as an official for the 2013 Fight Hunger Bowl, along with Thomas. Chaka joined the Officiating Development Program for the NFL in 2014. In 2018, Chaka began working regular season Pac-12 games. In 2019, Chaka began officiating NCAA Division I women's basketball.

In the 2020/2021 Pac-12 season, Chaka was the head linesman, including at the 2021 Senior Bowl. On March 5, 2021, Chaka received her promotion as an on-field official for the National Football League. Her first NFL game as line judge was on September 12, 2021, between the Carolina Panthers and the New York Jets.

After officiating in the NFL for three seasons, Chaka did not return to the league for 2024.

== Education and non-officiating career ==
In 2000, Chaka graduated from Edison Career & Technology High School, Rochester. She graduated from Norfolk State University in 2006. Chaka began her career in education as a health and physical education teacher at Virginia Beach Central Academy in 2006 which later became Renaissance Academy. In 2008, Chaka founded G.E.M.S. (Girls with Empowering Minds and Spirits), a club designed to promote self-esteem, academic achievement, and educational encouragement. In 2021, after 15 years with Renaissance Academy, Chaka accepted the position of Student Success Coordinator with An Achievable Dream Academy in Virginia Beach.

In 2021, Chaka founded the nonprofit Make Meaningful Change (MMC).

== Awards ==
- Elliot Cushing Award (2023)
- Orange Blossom Classic Breaking Barriers Award (2021)
- Black Enterprise 40 under 40 Class of (2021)
- ABC World News Person of the Week (2021)
- Men for Hope Trailblazer Award (2019)
- Virginia Beach Public Schools I Make a Difference Award (2019)
- Virginia Beach Public Schools Teacher of the Year Award (2014)
- Virginia Beach Public Schools I Make a Difference Award (2014)
- Virginia Beach Central Academy Reading Teacher of the Year Award (2009)

== See also ==
- List of African-American sports firsts
