= Pete Morelli =

American football official

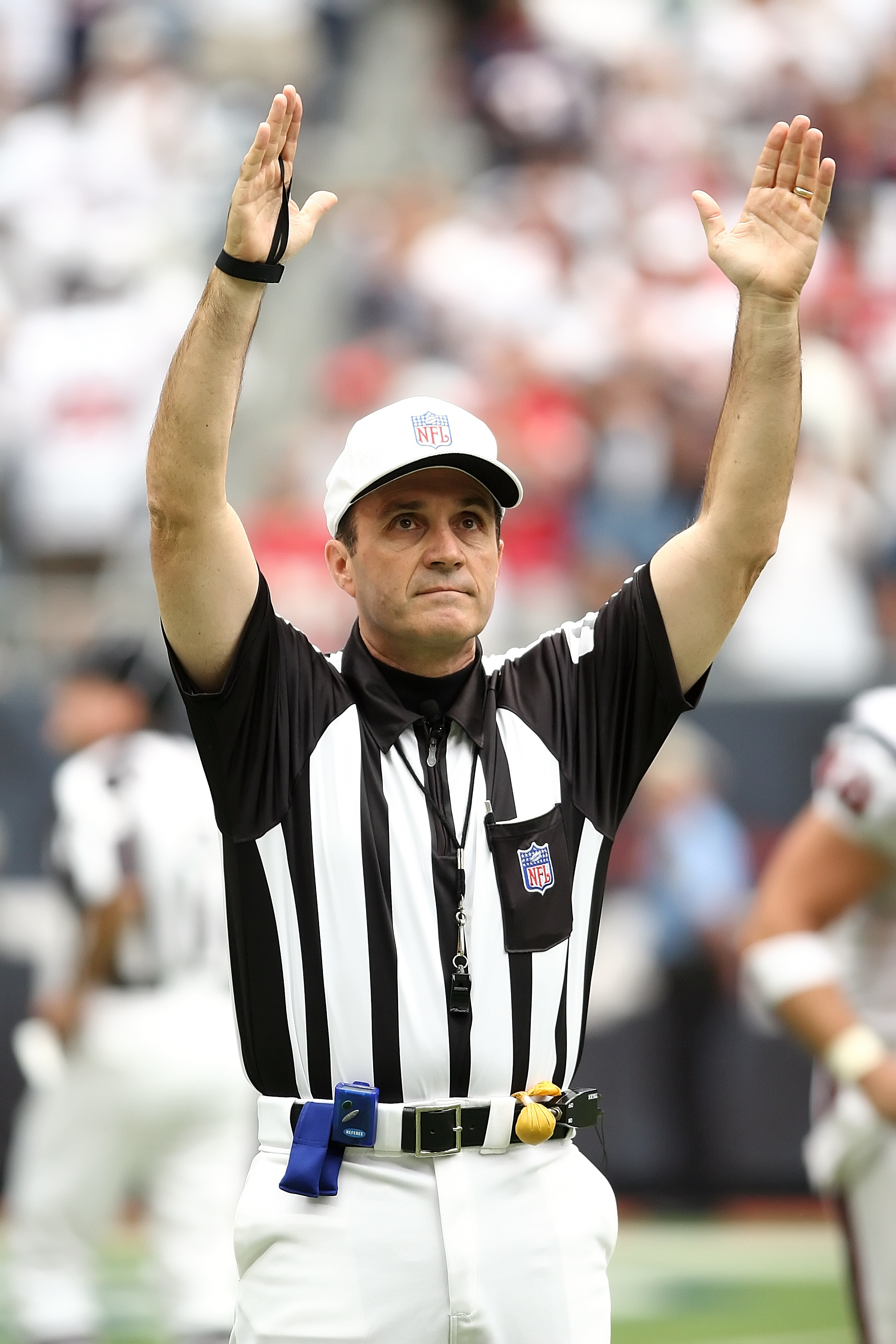
- Morelli in 2006
- Born: 1951 or 1952 (age 74–75)
- Occupation: NFL official (1997–2018)
- Spouse: Cindy
- Children: 2

Pete Morelli (born 1951 or 1952) is a retired American football official who worked in the National Football League (NFL) from 1997 to 2018. He wore uniform number 135.

== Career ==
=== Early years ===
In 1971, aged 19, Morelli began officiating with his father and two uncles, Joe and Tony Morelli. He started with the California Interscholastic Federation, working high school football games. For his performance, he was assigned playoff and championship games. He later progressed to the college level, officiating in the Big West Conference and Western Athletic Conference. He was selected to work eleven playoff games, including the 1996 Liberty Bowl.

=== NFL career ===
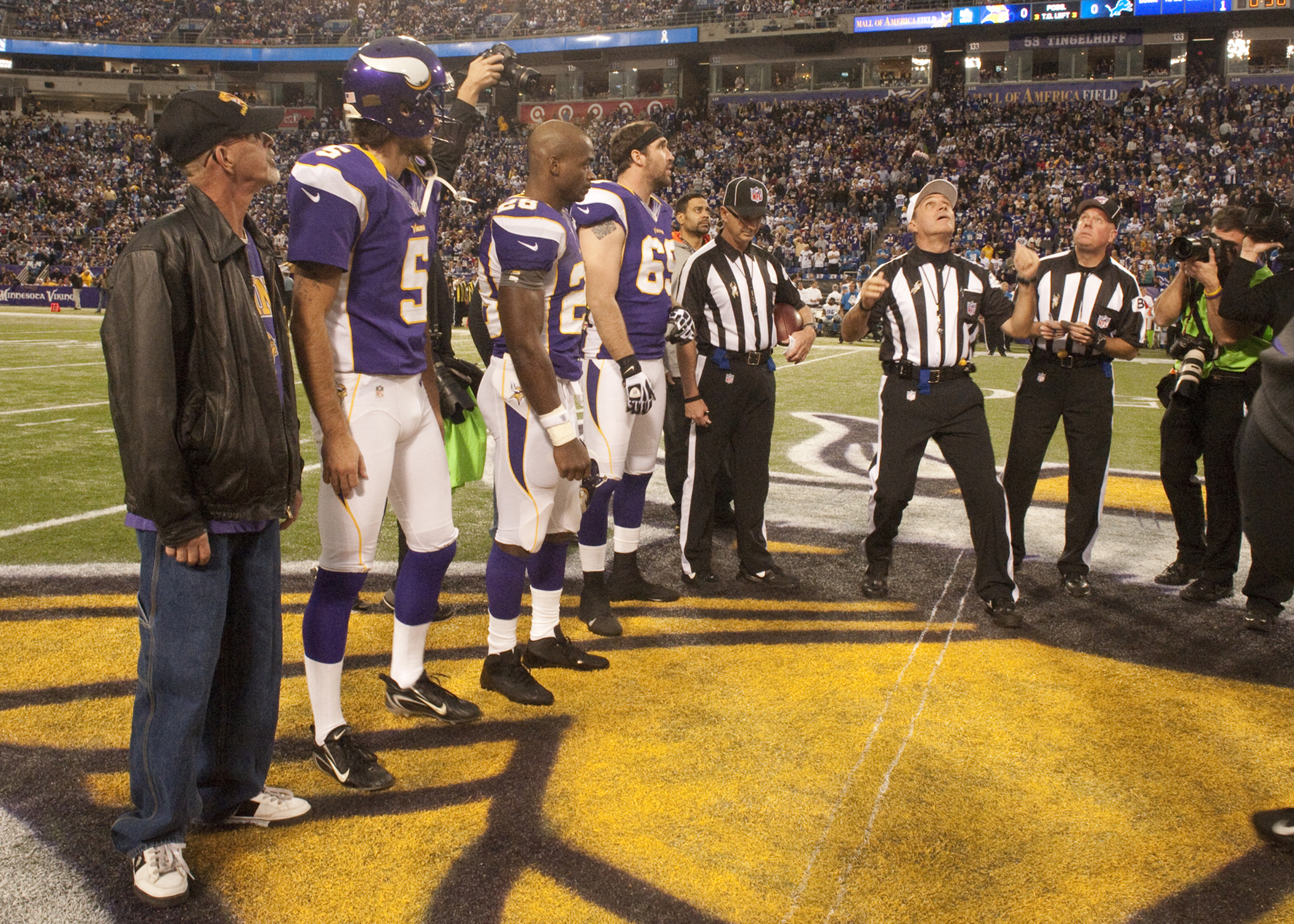
Pete Morelli conducts a coin toss

Morelli was hired by the NFL in 1997 as a back judge, then switched to field judge after the league swapped position titles in 1998. Morelli worked Super Bowl XXXVI in 2002 as a field judge. He was promoted to referee with the start of the 2003 NFL season following the retirements of Dick Hantak and Bob McElwee.

Morelli's 2018 NFL officiating crew consists of umpire Steve Woods, down judge Steve Stelljes, line judge Jeff Seeman, field judge Anthony Jeffries, side judge Boris Cheek, and back judge Keith Ferguson.

Morelli officiated the AFC divisional playoff game in January 2006 between the Indianapolis Colts and Pittsburgh Steelers. In the fourth quarter, Steelers safety Troy Polamalu intercepted a Peyton Manning pass and in the process he fumbled the ball, then recovered. Colts head coach Tony Dungy challenged the call, and upon review on instant replay, Morelli overturned the ruling. Following the game, Morelli said, "He was losing it while his other leg was still on the ground. Therefore, he did not complete the catch. And then he lost the ball." A day after the game, the NFL released a statement confirming that Polamalu made the interception, refuting the overturn call of Morelli. Mike Pereira, then-the league's vice president of officiating, said, "[Polamalu] maintained possession long enough to establish a catch. Therefore, the replay review should have upheld the call on the field that it was a catch and fumble."

In November 2007, Morelli was the referee of a game between the Cleveland Browns and Baltimore Ravens. Towards the end of regulation, Browns placekicker Phil Dawson attempted a 51-yard field goal to tie the game and force an overtime period. The ball ricocheted off the left upright, broke the vertical plane of the crossbar, and bounced off the stanchion and back over the crossbar and onto the field. Initially, field judge Jim Saracino and back judge Keith Ferguson signaled the kick was no good. After a five-minute discussion among the officials, Morelli announced over the public address system that he would "take a look at this play". Upon arriving at the instant review booth, Morelli was informed by replay assistant Howard Slavin through headphones that field goals are not reviewable. Ferguson "felt more strongly" that the ball had crossed through the goal posts and based on this, Morelli declared that the field goal was good. As a result of this incident, a rule change was passed during the ensuing offseason, making field goal attempts that bounce off the goal post reviewable under instant replay.

Morelli was the referee of the NFC Championship Game between the Minnesota Vikings and New Orleans Saints on January 24, 2010. Saints' Bobby McCray made a low blindside hit on Vikings quarterback Brett Favre that appeared to have violated the "Tom Brady Rule" in which defenders are not permitted to hit quarterbacks below the knees. Pereira later agreed that it was a missed call and a penalty flag should have been thrown. This, along with two other hits on Favre that did draw penalty flags from Morelli's crew, later became one of the many examples cited in the New Orleans Saints bounty scandal, in which the Saints were accused of operating a slush fund that paid out bonuses for in-game performance in violation of NFL rules.

Morelli received the Art McNally Award in 2015. Morelli was the referee for a prime-time NFC game between the Philadelphia Eagles and the Carolina Panthers on October 12, 2017, both 4-1 leading into the match-up and battling for the NFC Conference lead. Morelli and his crew made history, penalizing the Eagles 10 times for 126 yards, while penalizing the Panthers one time for one yard. This was the first time in NFL history that one team had over 120 penalty yards while the other had less than 10.

Morelli's final NFL game as referee was the 2019 Pro Bowl in Orlando, Florida, along with Walt Coleman. They both retired after that game.

== Personal life ==
Pete Morelli and his wife Cindy have two sons, Matt and Dan. Morelli previously served as president of St. Mary's High School in Stockton, California, where was inducted into the school's hall of fame in 2007.
