= Dick Creed =

American football official (1931–2024)

- Born: December 26, 1931; Struthers, Ohio, U.S.
- Died: December 28, 2024 (aged 93); Struthers, Ohio, U.S.
- Education: Youngstown College
- Occupation: NFL official (1978–2012)
- Awards: Art McNally Award (2012)

Richard L. Creed (December 26, 1931 – December 28, 2024) was an American professional football on-field official.

== Biography ==
Creed worked two Super Bowls, XXVI as a side judge, and XXX as a back judge. In all, he covered 25 playoff games.

Creed started in the NFL in 1978, when the league upgraded to 7-man officiating crews. In his first season, he made a notable call in the fourth quarter of a Patriots-Jets game at Shea Stadium. Creed flagged Jets' defensive back Burgess Owens for a personal foul, which extended the Patriots drive. The Patriots ended up kicking a field goal, and won the game 19–17.

Creed wore #61 for most of his career. He retired from on-field officiating in 1998, but continued to serve as a replay official for the next 15 years.

Creed died at home in Struthers, Ohio on December 28, 2024, at the age of 93.
