= Jerry Seeman =

American football official (1936–2013)

Jerry T. Seeman (March 11, 1936 − November 24, 2013) was an American football official in the National Football League (NFL) from 1975 to 1990 and was the NFL's Senior Director of Officiating from 1991 to 2001, succeeding Art McNally. In his 16 seasons in the NFL, Seeman was selected to officiate in 15 playoff games including two Pro Bowls, and two Super Bowls: XXIII in 1989 and XXV in 1991, and was an alternate referee for Super Bowl XIV in 1980. He wore uniform number 70 for the majority of his career (wearing number 17 during the 1979−81 seasons, when officials were numbered by position), and the number was retired eight months after his death. It was the first time the NFL had retired an official's uniform number.

== Biography ==
Seeman attended Plainview High School in Plainview, Minnesota, where he was a standout athlete in football, basketball, and baseball. Later, while attending Winona State University in Winona, Minnesota, he played quarterback for three years and played basketball for two years before graduating in 1957 with a degree in mathematics.

From 1963 to 1972, Seeman officiated high school football and basketball games in Minnesota for the Minnesota Intercollegiate Athletic Conference (MIAC) and Wisconsin for the Wisconsin State University Conference (WSUC). He also taught mathematics at Central High School in La Crosse, Wisconsin. In 1972, Seeman accepted a position as referee in the Big Ten Conference (alongside another future NFL referee, Jerry Markbreit), where he would stay until being hired by the NFL in 1975. In his first year in the NFL, Seeman worked as a line judge before moving to head linesman and eventually referee, a position he held from 1979 until the conclusion of the 1990 NFL season. His retirement from officiating in 1991 after serving as referee in Super Bowl XXV was prompted by being appointed to the Senior Director of Officiating by Commissioner Paul Tagliabue, replacing Art McNally, who spent 31 seasons as an NFL official and in the front office. On June 30, 2001, Seeman retired as Senior Director of Officiating and was succeeded by Mike Pereira. Seeman was later employed by the NFL as an observer for Sunday games. During his career, Seeman officiated 15 playoff games, two Pro Bowls, and two Super Bowls.

Seeman died of cancer on November 24, 2013, at his home in Blaine, Minnesota. Seeman was married to Marilyn and had three sons: Jeff (NFL line judge since 2002, No. 45), Jon, and Michael.

== Awards ==
Seeman has received these officiating honors during his career:

- National Federation of State High School Associations (NFHS) Hall of Fame
- Minnesota State High School League Hall of Fame
- National Association of Sports Officials Medallion Award

National Football League
Preceded by Art McNally as Director of Officiating	Senior Director of Officiating; 1991-2001	Succeeded by Mike Pereira as Vice President of Officiating
