= Sarah Thomas (American football official) =

American football official (born 1973)

- Born: Sarah Bailey; September 21, 1973 (age 52); Pascagoula, Mississippi, U.S.
- Occupation: NFL official (2015–present)
- Spouse: Brian Thomas (m. 2000)
- Children: 3

Sarah Thomas (née Bailey; born September 21, 1973) is an American football official for the National Football League (NFL).

Thomas is the first woman to officiate a major college football game, the first to officiate a bowl game, and the first to officiate in a Big Ten stadium. On April 8, 2015, Thomas was hired as the first full-time female official in NFL history, (Note: Shannon Eastin was the first woman to officiate an NFL game as a temporary non-union official during the 2012 NFL referee lockout.) and for the 2020 NFL season, she was on the officiating crew headed by referee Shawn Hochuli. She wears uniform number 53. In January 2021, she became the first woman to earn an on-field assignment for an NFL playoff game. In February 2021, she became the first woman to officiate in a Super Bowl.

== Personal life ==
Thomas was born in Pascagoula, Mississippi. She attended Pascagoula High School, where she lettered five times in softball, the first student to ever do so. She attended the University of Mobile on a basketball scholarship and was an academic all-American. In her three seasons on the basketball team, Thomas amassed 779 points, 441 rebounds, 108 assists, and 192 steals. This ranks her fifth in the school’s history.

Before becoming a referee, she worked as a pharmaceutical representative.

She is married to Brian Thomas. They have three children together. Thomas lives in Brandon, Mississippi.

== Officiating career ==
=== Early years ===
Thomas began her officiating career in 1996, when she attended a meeting of the Gulf Coast Football Officials Association. She worked her first varsity high school game in 1999.

=== Conference USA ===
In 2006, Gerry Austin, Conference USA's coordinator of officials who also refereed Super Bowls XXXI and XXXV, invited her to an officials' camp, due to Thomas proving her dedication and skills in the advancement of the industry. Austin was impressed with her skills and hired her for the Conference USA staff. In 2007, Thomas became the first woman to officiate a major college football game, working a game between Memphis and Jacksonville State. Before that game, Austin said, "She came highly recommended by two NFL scouts. She has a good presence and demeanor. I feel like she has the ability and courage to make a call, and the guts to not make one, too."

=== Bowl-game breakthrough ===
During the 2009 season, Thomas was one of five female officials in major college football and the only one at the Football Bowl Subdivision level. She was assigned to a crew and given a full schedule of 11 games. At the end of the season, she was selected to work the Little Caesars Pizza Bowl between Marshall and Ohio, making her the first woman to officiate a bowl game. Regarding her presence, Marshall running back and game MVP Martin Ward said "I noticed her before the game, but that was it. Once the game started, she was just doing the job that the line judge does in every game we play. It didn't matter that she was a woman at all."

On November 12, 2011, Thomas became the first woman to officiate in a Big Ten stadium, working as a line judge when Northwestern hosted Rice.

When asked about the challenges associated with being a football referee, Thomas claimed there have "not been any challenges" being a female in football and stated, "Everybody has been very professional, and they look at me just like another official", aiding in Thomas's defense to be viewed as equal to her colleagues.

=== United Football League ===
Thomas has officiated United Football League games, and in 2010 worked the league championship game.

=== National Football League ===
In 2013, Thomas became one of 21 finalists in contention for a permanent NFL officiating position. Thomas worked New Orleans Saints scrimmages, and was part of the NFL officiating development program, spending three days at the Indianapolis Colts minicamp.

On April 8, 2015, the NFL announced that Thomas would become the first permanent female official in NFL history. Thomas made her NFL regular season debut in a game between the Kansas City Chiefs and the Houston Texans at NRG Stadium on September 13, 2015, as part of Pete Morelli's crew as the line judge.

On December 24, 2016, Thomas broke her wrist in a mid-game collision on the sideline of a Vikings-Packers game. After being looked at for a brief concussion protocol, Thomas returned and finished the game with the broken wrist.

In 2017, Thomas moved to the down judge position. The change in the position name from head linesman coincided with the move in order to use a gender-neutral term.

Thomas is the first woman to earn an on-field assignment for an NFL playoff game. She was named to the crew for the game between the New England Patriots and Los Angeles Chargers on January 13, 2019. She was an alternate for the 2018 Atlanta Falcons and Los Angeles Rams Wild Card game. She appeared in a Super Bowl LIII commercial in 2019 with referee Ron Torbert (Thomas was the down judge on Torbert's crew during the 2018 season) for the NFL.

Thomas was selected for the Super Bowl LV officiating crew and became the first woman to officiate a Super Bowl, also in the down judge position.
