= Art McNally Award =

American football award

The Art McNally Award is an annual award created in 2002 by the then National Football League (NFL) Commissioner, Paul Tagliabue, and given to an NFL game official who exhibits exemplary professionalism, leadership, and commitment to sportsmanship, on and off the field. This award was presented at the Pro Bowl until 2019 and is now presented at the annual NFL officiating clinic held each July in Dallas.

The award is named after Art McNally, an NFL game official from 1959 to 1967 and supervisor of officials from 1968 to 1990. From 1996 until 2015, he served as an assistant supervisor of officials and officiating observer. Tagliabue said of McNally, "Art McNally truly represented the qualities that are inscribed on the award. His dedication to the game and his professionalism and class on and off the field set the standard."

== Award winners ==
| Year | Official | Position |
|---|---|---|
| 2002 | Bob McElwee | Referee |
| 2003 | Ben Montgomery | Line Judge |
| 2004 | Tom Fincken | Side Judge |
| 2005 | Gerald Austin | Referee |
| 2006 | Larry Nemmers | Referee |
| 2007 | Paul Weidner | Head Linesman |
| 2008 | Bill Carollo | Referee |
| 2009 | Bill Schmitz | Back Judge |
| 2010 | Bob Lawing | Back Judge |
| 2011 | Ronnie Baynes | Line Judge |
| 2012 | Dick Creed | Side Judge/Field Judge |
| 2013 | Al Jury | Field Judge |
| 2014 | Pete Morelli | Referee |
| 2015 | Red Cashion | Referee |
| 2016 | Jerry Markbreit | Referee |
| 2017 | Jim Tunney | Referee |
| 2018 | Ron Botchan | Umpire |
| 2019 | Bill Leavy | Referee |
| 2020 | Earnie Frantz | Down Judge/Replay Official |
| 2021 | Dave Wyant | Side Judge |
| 2022 | Byron Boston | Line Judge |
| 2023 | Wayne Mackie | Head Linesman |
| 2024 | Ed Hochuli | Referee |
| 2025 | Gary Slaughter | Head Linesman |

== See also ==
- List of NFL officials
- List of National Football League awards
