= Bob McElwee =

American football official (born 1935)

- Born: August 20, 1935 (age 89); Camden, New Jersey, U.S.
- Education: United States Naval Academy
- Occupation: National Football League official (1976–2003)
- Spouse: Bette (m. 1957)
- Children: Scott, Suzanne, and Tommy

Robert T. "Bob" McElwee (born August 20, 1935) is a former American football official, who served for 42 years, with 27 of those years in the National Football League (NFL) from 1976 to 2003. In the NFL, he wore the uniform number 95 for most of his career.

== Education ==
McElwee graduated from Haddonfield Memorial High School, where he was a three sport letterman, and a 1957 graduate of the United States Naval Academy, where he played linebacker for the football team and was a member of the Sugar Bowl championship team in 1955. Following graduation, McElwee was commissioned in the United States Air Force serving as a pilot and utilities engineer.

McElwee began officiating in 1961 while stationed at Hamilton Air Force Base in California. Upon discharge from the military, he returned home to the Philadelphia area and began officiating high school football. In 1966, McElwee received his first college assignment from the Eastern College Athletic Conference. He also spent 10 years officiating in the Ivy League.

== Career ==
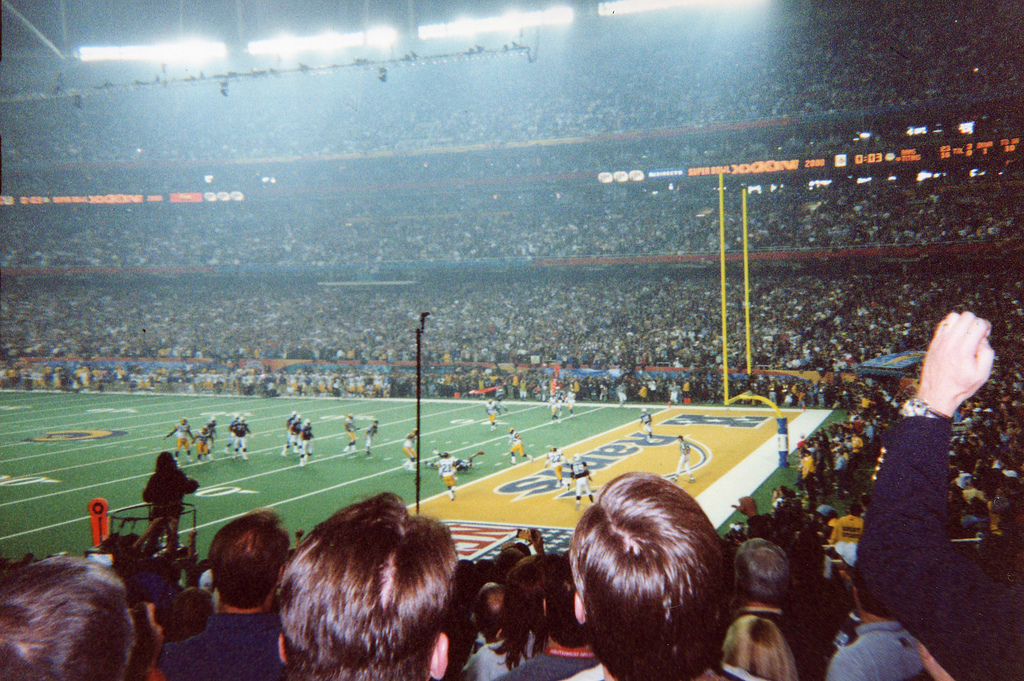
McElwee was the referee for Super Bowl XXXIV

McElwee joined the NFL in 1976 as a line judge and became a referee for the start of the 1980 NFL season. He was the referee for three Super Bowls (XXII in 1988, XXVIII in 1994, and XXXIV in 2000) and has officiated in numerous playoff games. McElwee is one of only 8 referees who have officiated 3 or more Super Bowls, along with Norm Schachter, Jim Tunney, Pat Haggerty, Jerry Markbreit, Terry McAulay, Carl Cheffers and Bill Vinovich. He is also the only referee to officiate a Super Bowl in 3 different decades. He was also the alternate referee in Super Bowl XVII in 1983. His final game was the 2003 Pro Bowl.

He was the last NFL official to work on a six-man crew prior to the addition of the side judge in 1978.

Bob is a partner in the McElwee Group, a firm specializing in construction of water filtration and waste water treatment plants and is heavily involved in community service. He is co-founder of Renew, an inner-city non-profit organization dedicated to providing housing for the disadvantaged in Camden, New Jersey. He has also worked on fund-raising efforts for the American Red Cross. He was also a long time member of the N.J. Chapter, Associated Builders & Contractors (ABC).

McElwee currently resides in Haddonfield, New Jersey, and is married with two sons, Scott and Tommy, and one daughter, Suzanne. He has six grandchildren: Sydney, Connor, Davis, Carter, Emma and Aline.

== Television career ==
- McElwee served as head referee for the television show, American Gladiators, in 1989–1990.
- Referee for ESPN's Battle of the Gridiron Stars.

== Awards ==
- Art McNally Award, 2002
- NASO Gold Whistle Award, 2004
- March of Dimes Citizen of the Year Award, 1993
- Outstanding Citizenship Award from the New Jersey State Interscholastic Athletic Association
