= Gerry Austin =

American football official (born 1941)

- Born: Gerald Austin; December 4, 1941 (age 84); Asheville, North Carolina, U.S.
- Occupations: NFL official (1982–2007); Supervisor of Officials, C-USA
- Spouse: Married
- Children: 6

Gerald Austin (born December 4, 1941) is a former American football official, who worked in the National Football League (NFL) from the 1982 season through the 2007 season. He wore uniform number 34, which is now worn by Clete Blakeman. Austin has officiated in three Super Bowls, one as a side judge and two as a referee. He was also notable being the referee in the 1993 AFC Wild Card playoff game between the Houston Oilers and Buffalo Bills, which would later become known in NFL lore as "The Comeback" for being the greatest comeback by a team in league history. Austin's 2007 NFL officiating crew consisted of Ruben Fowler, Ed Camp, Carl Johnson, Scott Edwards, Alberto Riveron and Bob Lawing.

== Personal ==
Austin has a bachelor's degree and master's degree from Western Carolina University and has a doctorate from the University of North Carolina at Greensboro. He is also a retired public school administrator for thirty years. Outside of officiating in the NFL, he is the coordinator of football officials for Conference USA. He resides in Summerfield, North Carolina and has six children.

== Officiating career ==
=== Early years ===
Before joining the NFL, Austin served nine years as a basketball and football official in the Atlantic Coast Conference. He was assigned to officiate in the 1978 Liberty Bowl and the 1977 Orange Bowl.

=== National Football League ===
Austin began working in the NFL as a side judge, where he officiated Super Bowl XXIV at New Orleans in 1990. He was promoted to the referee position beginning with the 1990 NFL season after Dick Jorgensen's death; Austin had served as a member of Jorgensen's crew in the Super Bowl at the end of the previous season. Austin worked his first Super Bowl as a referee in 1997 at Super Bowl XXXI (also in New Orleans) and his second appearance was at Super Bowl XXXV in 2001. He served as an alternate referee in 1995 at Super Bowl XXIX and in 1999 at Super Bowl XXXIII.

Austin is one of the league's most respected referees as he is a recipient of the Art McNally Award, which goes to an NFL game official who exhibits exemplary professionalism, leadership and commitment to sportsmanship on and off the field.

== Post-officiating career ==
After retiring, Austin contributed to ESPN broadcasts regarding the performance of officials.
