= Shannon Eastin =

American football official and judoka (born 1970)

- Born: 1970 (age 55–56); Worcester, Massachusetts, U.S.
- Known for: First female NFL official

Shannon Eastin (born 1970) is a former NFL official; she was the first female official of the National Football League (NFL). She has spent 16 combined seasons officiating for the Mid-Eastern Athletic Conference, high school games, and for the Arizona Cardinals Red and White game.

She was hired as a replacement official in 2012 during the lockout of full-time referees which began in June. She officiated her first game on August 9, a preseason game between the Green Bay Packers and the San Diego Chargers as the line judge. Eastin's first regular season game came on September 9 between the Detroit Lions and St. Louis Rams. Although several NFL players expressed support for Eastin being the first female NFL official, several writers such as Darin Gantt of Profootballtalk.com and Sam Farmer of the Los Angeles Times lamented that she broke this gender barrier while being a strikebreaker.

The NFL Referees Association (NFLR) also stated that Eastin should not have been allowed to officiate NFL games due to her participation in the World Series of Poker. NFL commissioner Roger Goodell said about Eastin that "she's well prepared for it, and I think she'll do terrific." Forbes magazine stated that Eastin being hired as an NFL replacement official only put a "...crack in the glass ceiling of NFL officiating, and she did so only as a temporary labor scab until the male officials later return." Some players like Pittsburgh Steelers linebacker Larry Foote expressed concern about her on-field role, with Foote explaining to the Associated Press, "Women are more honest and fair than men and they know how to catch a man cheating. I hope she's just a line judge. Don't want her to get hurt."

Eastin is also active in judo. At age 11, she was the youngest judo athlete to train in the U.S Olympic Training Center. She has won six national judo championships. Eastin owns a company called SE Sports Officiating, which trains officials in football and basketball. She currently lives in Tempe, Arizona.

== See also ==
- Sarah Thomas (American football official)
- Maia Chaka
- List of female American football players
