= Art McNally =

American football official (1925–2023)

- Art McNally

Personal information
- Born: July 1, 1925; Philadelphia, Pennsylvania, U.S.
- Died: January 1, 2023 (aged 97); Yardley, Pennsylvania, U.S.

Career information
- High school: Roman Catholic (Philadelphia)
- College: Temple

Career history
- National Football League (1968–1987) Supervisor of officials; National Football League (1988–1990) Director of officiating; World League of American Football (1991–1995) Head of officiating; National Football League (1996–2007) Assistant supervisor of officiating; National Football League (2008–2015) Officiating observer and trainer
- Pro Football Hall of Fame

Arthur Ignatius McNally (July 1, 1925 – January 1, 2023) was an American professional football executive who was director of officiating for the National Football League (NFL) from 1968 to 1991. Before becoming director of officiating—succeeding Mark Duncan, who had held the position from 1964 to 1968—McNally served as a field judge and referee in the NFL for nine years from 1959 to 1967. During a 22-year span, he officiated over 3,000 football, baseball, and basketball games, which included one year in the National Basketball Association (NBA). In 2022, McNally became the first NFL game official to be enshrined into the Pro Football Hall of Fame.

== Biography ==
McNally was a native of Philadelphia born on July 1, 1925. He graduated from Roman Catholic High School in 1943, served in the Marines during World War II, before graduating from Temple University in Philadelphia. He was a teacher and coach in the Philadelphia school district at Central High School until his appointment as the NFL's supervisor of officials before the 1968 season. He refereed for a season in the National Basketball Association as reported by Sunday Today with Willie Geist.

As NFL director of officiating, McNally headed a department of five men who coordinated and directed a staff of 112 game officials. He was responsible for the scouting, screening, hiring, and grading of the seven-man crews that work each NFL game. McNally was instrumental in using game footage for the evaluation of game officials.

McNally was succeeded by Jerry Seeman after the 1990 season. After retiring as director of officiating, McNally accepted the position as Supervisor of Officials for the World League of American Football in December 1991, a position he held for five years. McNally continued to serve as a league consultant and game observer thereafter.

McNally returned to the NFL front office in 1996 to work as an assistant supervisor of officials, a position he served in until 2008, before transitioning to an observer role for eight seasons. McNally officially retired following the 2015 season.

== Personal life and death ==
McNally was married to his first wife, Rita, until her death in 1981. He married his second wife, Sharon, in 1986. He had four children - Zach, Jonah, Brayden, and Jake.

After the death of Charley Trippi in October 2022, McNally was the oldest living member of the Pro Football Hall of Fame until his own death.

McNally died at a hospice facility in Yardley, Pennsylvania, on January 1, 2023, at the age of 97.

== Awards and honors ==
In August 2022, McNally became the first NFL official inducted into the Pro Football Hall of Fame, after being voted in that January. At 96, McNally was the oldest person to be inducted during his lifetime.

- Oversaw the first instant replay system in the NFL beginning with the 1986 season.
- Enshrined to the Pennsylvania Sports Hall of Fame, 1987.
- First recipient of the Gold Whistle Award, National Association of Sports Officials, 1988.
- NFL Commissioner Paul Tagliabue created the Art McNally Award in 2002 to annually honour an NFL game official who exhibits exemplary professionalism, leadership and commitment to sportsmanship on and off the field.
- Recipient of the Reds Bagnell Award, Maxwell Football Club, 2004.
- Named a finalist for the 2020 class of the Pro Football Hall of Fame as a contributor.
- Inducted to the 2022 class of the Pro Football Hall of Fame, the first game official to be enshrined in Canton.
- Inducted into the Philadelphia Sports Hall of Fame in 2022.
