= 1986 Dallas Cowboys season =

NFL team season

- Owner: Bum Bright
- General manager: Tex Schramm
- Head coach: Tom Landry
- Home stadium: Texas Stadium

Results
- Record: 7–9
- Division place: 3rd NFC East
- Playoffs: Did not qualify
- Pro Bowlers: None

The 1986 Dallas Cowboys season was the franchise's 27th season in the National Football League. The team finished the regular season at 7–9, their first time finishing with a losing record since 1964.

== Summary ==
The Cowboys, re-invigorated by the off-season acquisitions of running back Herschel Walker and passing coordinator Paul Hackett, got off to a strong 6–2 start, including a season opening win on Monday night over the eventual Super Bowl champion New York Giants, which saw Walker score the winning touchdown late in the game, and a 30–6 blowout win over the Washington Redskins, which ended the Redskins 5–0 start. Quarterbacks Danny White and Steve Pelluer played well early in the season under Hackett's tutelage, who was brought over from the San Francisco 49ers to breathe new life into the passing game. However, White broke his wrist on a sack by Carl Banks during a crucial loss to the New York Giants, and was ruled out for the season. Pelluer took over as the starting quarterback, and struggled mightily, throwing 17 interceptions over the course of the season, as well as seeing constant pressure from opposing pass rushers, including being sacked a team record twelve times in a game against San Diego. The Cowboys lost seven out of their final eight games, and suffered a five-game losing streak to close out the season, including embarrassing losses to the Redskins (41–14) and the Seahawks in the annual Thanksgiving Day game (31–14). It was the Cowboys' first loss on Thanksgiving since 1979. During the third quarter of a late-season loss to the Los Angeles Rams, Tom Landry was forced to leave the field due to a threat against his life. Landry returned to the field later in the game wearing a bulletproof vest.

The Cowboys undoing certainly wasn't because of an inability to move the football, as the team ranked fourth in the NFL in total offense. Running back Herschel Walker rushed for 737 yards, caught 76 passes for 837 yards, and scored 14 touchdowns. Late in the season against the Eagles, Walker had a combined 292 yards rushing and receiving, breaking the team single game record. Running back Tony Dorsett added 748 yards rushing, and even though he was still the team's starting running back, he was clearly unhappy with his reduced role. This was the first non-strike season he hadn't rushed for 1,000 yards. The passing game flourished under Danny White early in the year, but following White's injury, turnovers and an inability to protect the quarterback neutralized the passing attack. Wide receiver Tony Hill and tight end Doug Cosbie both began to show their age, and Mike Renfro was limited because of injury. Rookie wide receiver Mike Sherrard provided a deep threat, gaining 744 yards on just 41 receptions. Defensively, the team struggled to stop the run, finishing 23rd against the run, and the secondary, an opportunistic bunch in past seasons, only intercepted 17 passes during the season. The pass rush was still strong, despite defensive tackle Randy White finally beginning to slow down due to age and injury, as fourth year defensive end Jim Jeffcoat stepped up with 14 sacks. Overall, it was mistakes that would plague the team throughout the 1986 season. The offensive line gave up 60 sacks, the offense turned the ball over 41 times, and the team committed 112 penalties.

No Cowboys were selected for the Pro Bowl in 1986.

== Offseason ==
=== NFL draft ===
1986 Dallas Cowboys draft
Round	Pick	Player	Position	College	Notes
1	18	Mike Sherrard	WR	UCLA	
2	33	Darryl Clack	RB	Arizona State	
3	74	Mark Walen	DT	UCLA	
4	100	Max Zendejas	PK	Arizona	
6	140	Thornton Chandler	TE	Alabama	
6	150	Stan Gelbaugh	QB	Maryland	
6	158	Lloyd Yancey	OG	Temple	
7	185	Johnny Holloway	WR	Kansas	
8	212	Topper Clemons	RB	Wake Forest	
9	242	John Ionata	OG	Florida State	
10	269	Bryan Chester	OG	Texas	
11	296	Garth Jax	LB	Florida State	
12	307	Chris Duliban	LB	Texas	
12	322	Tony Flack	DB	Georgia	
Made roster † Pro Football Hall of Fame * Made at least one Pro Bowl during career

== Roster ==
Dallas Cowboys 1986 roster
Quarterbacks: 10 Reggie Collier; 14 Paul McDonald; 16 Steve Pelluer; Running backs: 42 Darryl Clack; 33 Tony Dorsett; 46 Todd Fowler; 29 Robert Lavette; 30 Timmy Newsome; 34 Herschel Walker; Wide receivers: 87 Gordon Banks; 80 Tony Hill; 82 Mike Renfro; 86 Mike Sherrard; Tight ends: 85 Thornton Chandler; 84 Doug Cosbie	Offensive linemen: 62 Brian Baldinger C/G; 68 Crawford Ker G; 67 Nate Newton G; 75 Phil Pozderac T; 64 Tom Rafferty C; 70 Howard Richards T; 63 Glen Titensor G; 71 Mark Tuinei T; Defensive linemen: 99 Kevin Brooks DT/DE; 78 John Dutton DT; 77 Jim Jeffcoat DE; 72 Ed Jones DE; 60 Don Smerek DE/DT; 54 Randy White DT	Linebackers: 55 Steve DeOssie MLB/LS; 58 Mike Hegman OLB; 53 Garth Jax OLB; 56 Eugene Lockhart MLB; 59 Jesse Penn OLB; 50 Jeff Rohrer OLB; Defensive backs: 36 Vince Albritton SS; 40 Bill Bates SS; 26 Michael Downs FS; 27 Ron Fellows CB; 45 Manny Hendrix CB; 23 Johnny Holloway CB; 22 Victor Scott FS; 24 Everson Walls CB; Special teams: 4 Mike Saxon P; 1 Rafael Septién K	Reserve lists: 61 Jim Cooper T (IR); 52 Chris Duliban LB (IR); 28 Norm Granger RB (IR); -- George McDuffie DE (IR); ## Carl Miller RB (IR); 65 Kurt Petersen G (IR); 81 Karl Powe WR (IR); 89 Brian Salonen LB/TE (IR); 95 Mark Walen DE (IR); 11 Danny White QB (IR); ## Lloyd Yancey G (IR); Rookies in italics

== Regular season ==
=== Schedule ===
Week	Date	Opponent	Result	Record	Game Site	Attendance	Recap
1	September 8	**New York Giants**	**W** 31–28	1–0	Texas Stadium	59,804	Recap
2	September 14	at Detroit Lions	**W** 31–7	2–0	Pontiac Silverdome	73,812	Recap
3	September 21	Atlanta Falcons	**L** 35–37	2–1	Texas Stadium	62,880	Recap
4	September 29	at **St. Louis Cardinals**	**W** 31–7	3–1	Busch Stadium	49,077	Recap
5	October 5	at Denver Broncos	**L** 14–29	3–2	Mile High Stadium	76,082	Recap
6	October 12	**Washington Redskins**	**W** 30–6	4–2	Texas Stadium	63,264	Recap
7	October 19	at **Philadelphia Eagles**	**W** 17–14	5–2	Veterans Stadium	68,572	Recap
8	October 26	**St. Louis Cardinals**	**W** 37–6	6–2	Texas Stadium	60,756	Recap
9	November 2	at **New York Giants**	**L** 14–17	6–3	Giants Stadium	74,871	Recap
10	November 9	Los Angeles Raiders	**L** 13–17	6–4	Texas Stadium	61,706	Recap
11	November 16	at San Diego Chargers	**W** 24–21	7–4	Jack Murphy Stadium	55,622	Recap
12	November 23	at **Washington Redskins**	**L** 14–41	7–5	RFK Stadium	55,642	Recap
13	November 27	Seattle Seahawks	**L** 14–31	7–6	Texas Stadium	58,020	Recap
14	December 7	at Los Angeles Rams	**L** 10–29	7–7	Anaheim Stadium	64,949	Recap
15	December 14	**Philadelphia Eagles**	**L** 21–23	7–8	Texas Stadium	46,117	Recap
16	December 21	Chicago Bears	**L** 10–24	7–9	Texas Stadium	57,256	Recap

Division opponents are in bold text

=== Standings ===
NFC East
	W	L	T	PCT	DIV	CONF	PF	PA	STK
New York Giants^{(1)}	14	2	0	.875	7–1	11–1	371	236	W9
Washington Redskins^{(4)}	12	4	0	.750	5–3	9–3	368	296	W1
Dallas Cowboys	7	9	0	.438	5–3	6–6	346	337	L5
Philadelphia Eagles	5	10	1	.344	1–6–1	3–8–1	256	312	L1
St. Louis Cardinals	4	11	1	.281	1–6–1	3–10–1	218	351	W1

== Game summaries ==
=== Week 1: vs. New York Giants ===
Herschel Walker could have arrived at a better time, with Tony Dorsett sidelined with a first half ankle injury, Walker ended his NFL debut by scoring a game-winning touchdown on a 10-yard run with 1:16 to play against the Giants. It was Walker's 2nd TD of the night-a Monday Night in which he ran for 64 yards on 10 tries. Dorsett opened the scoring on a 36-yard toss from Danny White in the second quarter, but New York rallies from 14-0 and 24–21 to claim a 28–24 lead on Phil Simms' third TD pass with 5:24 remaining. Simms threw for 300 yards, but it was Walker having arrived from the USFL that made the difference for Dallas.

Quarter	1	2	3	4	Total
Giants	0	14	7	7	28
Cowboys	0	17	0	14	31

at Texas Stadium, Irving, Texas

- Date: Monday, September 8
- Game time: 8:00 p.m. CDT
- Game weather: 71 °F (22 °C), wind 11 mph (18 km/h)
- Game attendance: 59,804
- Referee: Pat Haggerty
- TV announcers (ABC): Al Michaels (play by play), Frank Gifford (color commentator)
- Pro-Football-Reference.com

Game information

Second quarter

- DAL – Tony Dorsett 36 yard pass from Danny White (Rafael Septién kick) – Cowboys 7–0
- DAL – Herschel Walker 1 yard run (Rafael Septién kick) – Cowboys 14–0
- NYG – Bobby Johnson 13 yard pass from Phil Simms (Bob Thomas kick) – Cowboys 14–7
- NYG – Stacy Robinson 3 yard pass from Phil Simms (Bob Thomas kick) – Tied 14–14
- DAL – Rafael Septién 35 yard field goal – Cowboys 17–14

Third quarter

- NYG – Joe Morris 2 yard run (Bob Thomas kick) – Giants 21–17

Fourth quarter

- DAL – Thornton Chandler 1 yard pass from Danny White (Rafael Septién kick) – Cowboys 24–21
- NYG – Bobby Johnson 44 yard pass from Phil Simms (Bob Thomas kick) – Giants 28–24
- DAL – Herschel Walker 10 yard run (Rafael Septién kick) – Cowboys 31–28

Giants

- Phil Simms
  22/45, 300 Yds, 3 TD, INT
- Joe Morris
  20 Rush, 87 Yds, TD
- Bobby Johnson
  7 Rec, 105 Yds, 2 TD

Cowboys

- Danny White
  23/39, 279 Yds, 2 TD
- Herschel Walker
  10 Rush, 64 Yds, 2 TD
- Tony Hill
  5 Rec, 107 Yds

=== Week 9: at New York Giants ===
Quarter	1	2	3	4	Total
Cowboys	0	7	0	7	14
Giants	3	7	0	7	17

at Giants Stadium, East Rutherford, New Jersey

- Date: November 2
- Game time: 12 noon CST
- Game weather: 59 °F (15 °C), wind 14 mph (23 km/h)
- Game attendance: 74,871
- Referee: Dick Hantak
- TV announcers (CBS): Pat Summerall (play-by-play), John Madden (color commentary)

=== Week 10: vs. Los Angeles Raiders ===
Team	1	2	3	4	Total
• Raiders	0	3	7	7	17
Cowboys	3	7	3	0	13

- Date: November 9
- Location: Texas Stadium, Irving, Texas
- Game start: 4:00 p.m.
- Game weather: 56 °F (13 °C); wind 13 mph (21 km/h)
- Referee: Pat Haggerty
- TV announcers (NBC): Dick Enberg and Merlin Olsen

Scoring summary
Q1	DAL	Septién 20 yard field goal	DAL 3–0
Q2	LA	Bahr 45 yard field goal	Tie 3–3
Q2	DAL	Dorsett 13 yard run (Septién kick)	DAL 10–3
Q3	LA	Williams 20 yard pass from Plunkett (Bahr kick)	Tie 10–10
Q3	DAL	Septién 20 yard field goal	DAL 13–10
Q4	LA	Williams 40 yard pass from Plunkett (Bahr kick)	LA 17–13

- Dokie Williams 5 Rec, 107 Yds

=== Week 13: vs. Seattle Seahawks ===
Quarter	1	2	3	4	Total
Seahawks	7	17	0	7	31
Cowboys	7	0	7	0	14

at Texas Stadium, Irving, Texas

- Date: November 27
- Game time: 3:00pm local
- Game weather: partly cloudy, 50 °F (10 °C), 61% humidity, wind N 13 miles per hour (21 km/h)
- Game attendance: 58,020
- Referee: Bob McElwee
- TV announcers (NBC): Dick Enberg, Merlin Olsen, and Bob Griese (sideline)
- Gamebook

Game information

First quarter

- DAL – Tony Dorsett 8-yard run (Rafael Septién kick), 5:57 (DAL 7–0)
- SEA – Dave Krieg 4-yard run (Norm Johnson kick), 0:41 (Tied 7–7)

Second quarter

- SEA – Steve Largent 11-yard pass from Dave Krieg (Norm Johnson kick), 7:04 (SEA 14–7)
- SEA – Byron Franklin 19-yard pass from Dave Krieg (Norm Johnson kick), 1:56 (SEA 21–7)
- SEA – Norm Johnson 42-yard field goal, 0:08 (SEA 24–7)

Third quarter

- DAL – Herschel Walker 1-yard run (Rafael Septién kick), 6:54 (SEA 24–14)

Fourth quarter

- SEA – Curt Warner 9-yard run (Norm Johnson kick), 10:06 (SEA 31–14)

Top passers

- SEA – Dave Krieg: 16/24, 214 yds, 2 TD, 1 INT
- DAL – Steve Pelluer: 22/36, 210 yds

Top rushers

- SEA – Curt Warner: 22 car, 122 yds, 1 TD
- DAL – Tony Dorsett: 14 car, 59 yds, 1 TD

Top receivers

- SEA – Steve Largent: 3 rec, 75 yds, 1 TD
- DAL – Mike Sherrard: 4 rec, 61 yds

Team – pass – rush – total – to

- SEA – 214 – 201 – 415 – 1
- DAL – 201 – 127 – 328 – 1

== Awards ==
For the first time in team history, the Cowboys had no players chosen to play in the Pro Bowl. They also had no players mentioned on the Associated Press' All-NFL team.

== Publications ==
- The Football Encyclopedia ISBN 0-312-11435-4
- Total Football ISBN 0-06-270170-3
- Cowboys Have Always Been My Heroes ISBN 0-446-51950-2
