= 1983 Dallas Cowboys season =

NFL team season

- Owner: Clint Murchison Jr.
- General manager: Tex Schramm
- Head coach: Tom Landry
- Defensive coordinator: Ernie Stautner
- Home stadium: Texas Stadium

Results
- Record: 12–4
- Division place: 2nd NFC East
- Playoffs: Lost Wild Card Playoffs (vs. Rams) 17–24
- Pro Bowlers: 5

The 1983 Dallas Cowboys season was the franchise's 24th season in the National Football League. Despite a hot start that saw them win their first seven games, the Cowboys finished second in the NFC East. They qualified for the playoffs for the ninth consecutive season, setting a new record for most consecutive playoff appearances by a team in NFL history (the previous mark was jointly held by three teams, one of which was the 1966–1973 Cowboys). The record was tied by the Indianapolis Colts in 2010 before the New England Patriots broke the record in 2019.

== Summary ==
The team started the season with seven straight victories, including a memorable Monday night win over the Washington Redskins in which the team erased a 20-point halftime deficit and prevailed, 31–30. The Cowboys were particularly strong on offense, led by quarterback Danny White and running back Tony Dorsett. The Cowboys scored a team record 479 points and staged a few come-from-behind victories during the season. However, the defense gave up many points, despite strong play from Randy White, Ed "Too Tall" Jones, and Everson Walls. In particular, the young secondary was guilty of giving up many big plays throughout the season.

Late in the season, the Cowboys met the Redskins at Texas Stadium with the NFC East crown up for grabs. Both teams entered the game with 12–2 records, but the defending champion Redskins proved too much for the Cowboys and emerged with a 31–10 victory, giving them the NFC East title. With the Cowboys trailing 14–10 in the third quarter, the Cowboys failed on a fourth and one at midfield. The play was a key turning point. There appeared to be a miscommunication between quarterback Danny White and Tom Landry as to whether to run the play. The failed play led to a rare emotional outburst from Landry as he yelled "No, Danny, no." After a 42–17 drubbing at the hands of the San Francisco 49ers the following week, the Cowboys faced the Los Angeles Rams in the wild card game of the NFC playoffs. Despite having the home field advantage, the Cowboys fell, 24–17.

=== NFL draft ===
1983 Dallas Cowboys draft
Round	Pick	Player	Position	College	Notes
1	23	Jim Jeffcoat	DE	Arizona State	
2	50	Michael Walter	LB	Oregon	
3	70	Bryan Caldwell	DE	Arizona State	
4	108	Chris Faulkner	TE	Florida	
5	135	Chuck McSwain	RB	Clemson	
6	162	Reggie Collier	QB	Southern Miss	
7	189	Chris Schultz	OT	Arizona	
8	220	Lawrence Ricks	RB	Michigan	
9	246	Al Gross	S	Arizona	
10	273	Eric Moran	OT	Washington	Signed with the USFL
11	300	Dan Taylor	OT	Idaho State	
12	331	Lorenzo Bouier	RB	Maine	
Made roster † Pro Football Hall of Fame * Made at least one Pro Bowl during career

=== Undrafted free agents ===
1983 undrafted free agents of note
Player	Position	College
Raúl Allegre	Kicker	Texas
Jerry Schmidt	Def. Line	Cal Poly SLO
Bill Bates	Safety	Tennessee
Broderick Thompson	Tackle	Kansas
Mark Tuinei	Tackle	Hawaii

== Roster ==
Dallas Cowboys 1983 roster
Quarterbacks: 18 Glenn Carano; 14 Gary Hogeboom; 11 Danny White P; Running backs: 31 Gary Allen; 33 Tony Dorsett; 44 Robert Newhouse; 30 Timmy Newsome; 20 Ron Springs; Wide receivers: 83 Doug Donley; 80 Tony Hill; 86 Butch Johnson; 88 Drew Pearson; Tight ends: 84 Doug Cosbie; 89 Billy Joe DuPree; 82 Cleo Simmons	Offensive linemen: 62 Brian Baldinger G/C; 61 Jim Cooper T; 67 Pat Donovan T; 65 Kurt Petersen G; 75 Phil Pozderac T; 64 Tom Rafferty C; 70 Howard Richards G; 66 Chris Schultz T; 68 Herbert Scott G; 63 Glen Titensor C/G; Defensive linemen: 76 Larry Bethea DE; 78 John Dutton DT; 77 Jim Jeffcoat DE; 72 Ed Jones DE; 79 Harvey Martin DE; 60 Don Smerek DT; 71 Mark Tuinei DT; 54 Randy White DT	Linebackers: 53 Bob Breunig MLB; 51 Anthony Dickerson OLB; 58 Mike Hegman OLB; 55 Bruce Huther MLB; 57 Angelo King OLB; 50 Jeff Rohrer OLB; 59 Michael Walter OLB; Defensive backs: 40 Bill Bates SS; 47 Dextor Clinkscale SS; 26 Michael Downs FS; 27 Ron Fellows CB; 25 Rod Hill CB; 32 Dennis Thurman CB; 24 Everson Walls CB; Special teams: 3 Jim Miller P; 1 Rafael Septién K	Reserve lists: -- Bryan Caldwell DE (IR); 23 James Jones RB (IR); 52 Scott McLean LB (IR); 35 Chuck McSwain RB (IR); 81 Kirk Phillips WR (IR); -- Dan Taylor G (IR); -- Gregg Veldman TE (IR); 5 John Warren P (IR); Rookies in italics 49 active, 8 inactive

== Schedule ==
Week	Date	Opponent	Result	Record	Game Site	Attendance	Recap
1	September 5	at **Washington Redskins**	**W** 31–30	1–0	RFK Stadium	55,045	Recap
2	September 11	at **St. Louis Cardinals**	**W** 34–17	2–0	Busch Stadium	48,532	Recap
3	September 18	**New York Giants**	**W** 28–13	3–0	Texas Stadium	62,347	Recap
4	September 25	New Orleans Saints	**W** 21–20	4–0	Texas Stadium	62,136	Recap
5	October 2	at Minnesota Vikings	**W** 37–24	5–0	Hubert H. Humphrey Metrodome	60,774	Recap
6	October 9	Tampa Bay Buccaneers	**W** 27–24 (OT)	6–0	Texas Stadium	63,308	Recap
7	October 16	**Philadelphia Eagles**	**W** 37–7	7–0	Texas Stadium	63,070	Recap
8	October 23	Los Angeles Raiders	**L** 38–40	7–1	Texas Stadium	64,991	Recap
9	October 30	at **New York Giants**	**W** 38–20	8–1	Giants Stadium	76,142	Recap
10	November 6	at **Philadelphia Eagles**	**W** 27–20	9–1	Veterans Stadium	71,236	Recap
11	November 13	at San Diego Chargers	**L** 23–24	9–2	Jack Murphy Stadium	46,192	Recap
12	November 20	Kansas City Chiefs	**W** 41–21	10–2	Texas Stadium	64,103	Recap
13	November 24	**St. Louis Cardinals**	**W** 35–17	11–2	Texas Stadium	60,974	Recap
14	December 4	at Seattle Seahawks	**W** 35–10	12–2	Kingdome	63,352	Recap
15	December 11	**Washington Redskins**	**L** 10–31	12–3	Texas Stadium	65,074	Recap
16	December 19	at San Francisco 49ers	**L** 17–42	12–4	Candlestick Park	59,957	Recap

Division opponents are in bold text

The October 16 and November 6 games against the Philadelphia Eagles were played with locations switched from the original schedule, because of October 16 conflict with game 5 of the baseball World Series.

== Season summary ==
=== Week 1 ===
Quarter	1	2	3	4	Total
Cowboys (1–0)	0	3	14	14	31
Redskins (0–1)	10	13	0	7	30

at Robert F. Kennedy Memorial Stadium

- Date: Monday, September 5
- Game time: 9:00 p.m.(et)
- Game weather: 84 degrees, relative humidity 66, round(wind) 6.5 mph
- Referee: Gene Barth
- TV announcers (ABC): Frank Gifford, Don Meredith, O. J. Simpson and Howard Cosell
- Pro-Football-Reference.com

Game information

First quarter

- Redskins – Mark Moseley 23-yard field goal – Redskins 3–0
- Redskins – John Riggins 1-yard rush (Mark Moseley kick) – Redskins 10–0

Second quarter

- Cowboys – Rafael Septién 26-yard field goal – Redskins 10–3
- Redskins – Mark Moseley 30-yard field goal – Redskins 13–3
- Redskins – Mark Moseley 39-yard field goal – Redskins 16–3
- Redskins – Charlie Brown 41-yard pass from Joe Theismann (Mark Moseley kick) – Redskins 23–3

Third quarter

- Cowboys – Tony Hill 75-yard pass from Danny White (Rafael Septién kick) – Redskins 23–10
- Cowboys – Tony Hill 51-yard pass from Danny White (Rafael Septién kick) – Redskins 23–17

Fourth quarter

- Cowboys – Danny White 1-yard rush (Rafael Septién kick) – Cowboys 24–23
- Cowboys – Doug Cosbie 1-yard pass from Danny White (Rafael Septién kick) – Cowboys 31–23
- Redskins – Don Warren 1-yard pass from Joe Theismann (Mark Moseley kick) – Cowboys 31–30

Passing

- Cowboys – Danny White – 9/20, 193 Yds, 3 TD, O Int, 75 Lng
- Redskins – Joe Theismann – 28/38, 325 Yds, 2 TD, 1 Int, 41 Lng

Rushing

- Cowboys – Tony Dorsett – 14 att/151 yds, O TD, 77 Lng
- Cowboys – Ron Springs – 9 att/32 yds, O TD, 8 Lng
- Redskins – John Riggins – 27 att/89 yds, 1 TD, 18 Lng
- Redskins – Joe Washington – 5 att/9 yds, O TD, 5 Lng

Receiving

- Cowboys – Tony Hill – 3 Rec, 133 yds, 2 TD, 75 Lng
- Cowboys – Doug Cosbie – 3 Rec, 36 yds, 1 TD, 18 Lng
- Cowboys – Ron Springs – 2 Rec, 17 yds, O TD, 10 Lng
- Cowboys – Drew Pearson – 1 Rec, 7 yds, 0 TD, 7 Lng
- Redskins – Alvin Garret – 10 Rec, 101 yds, 0 TD, 21 Lng
- Redskins – Charlie Brown – 6 Rec, 97 yds, 1 TD, 41 Lng
- Redskins – Rick Walker – 4 Rec, 45 yds, 0 TD, 21 Lng
- Redskins – Don Warren – 2 Rec, 9 yds, 1 TD, 8 Lng
- Redskins – Joe Washington – 2 Rec, 28 yds, 0 TD, 15 Lng

Vegas Spread

- Vegas Line= Dal −1.5
- Over/Under= 41(Over)

Cowboys Overcome 20-Point Deficit, Beat Redskins in Opener

The Washington Redskins, champions of the NFL in 1982, began their title defense with a Monday night game on September 5, 1983, against their arch-rivals, the Dallas Cowboys. It was a humid 87 degree night in Washington, but it did not dampen the enthusiasm of the sellout crowd of 55,045 at RFK Stadium.

Washington, coached by Joe Gibbs, featured the passing of QB Joe Theismann and the ground-gaining of rugged RB John Riggins on offense, along with an outstanding line known as "The Hogs" and a capable group of receivers led by WR Art Monk. The defense lacked big names but played well as a unit.

As for Head coach Tom Landry's Cowboys, they had most recently lost to the Redskins in the NFC Championship game – their third straight trip to the conference title contest that ended in defeat. QB Danny White was capable but also living in the shadow of his illustrious predecessor, Roger Staubach, and RB Tony Dorsett, TE Doug Cosbie, and wide receivers Tony Hill (pictured above) and Drew Pearson were all solid offensive performers. The defense had slipped in ’82, however, showing signs of age.

The Redskins were emotionally high coming into the opening game and did well at exploiting weaknesses in the Dallas defense during the first half. The Cowboys started their first drive from their own 16-yard line and that was typical during the first two quarters of play as they were consistently kept on their own half of the field.

In the first quarter, Mark Moseley started the scoring off with a 23-yard field goal and Riggins scored a touchdown on a one-yard carry. The biggest first half highlight for Dallas came in the second quarter on a 77-yard run by Tony Dorsett, who was caught from behind by fleet CB Darrell Green. Stifled again by Washington's defense, the Cowboys had to settle for a 26-yard Rafael Septién field goal.

Moseley followed up with field goals of 30 and 39 yards and, with 40 seconds left in the first half, WR Charlie Brown made an outstanding catch of a Theismann pass for a 41-yard touchdown that seemingly put the Redskins in command at 23–3.

Theismann amassed 181 passing yards in the first half, making good use of short sideline passes to his wide receivers. Meanwhile, Danny White was a miserable one-for-nine. Dallas managed just three first downs, one of them on a penalty. However, for all the dominance Washington had scored just two touchdowns, along with three field goals.

The Cowboys made adjustments to the defense at halftime that successfully countered Washington's attack during the second half. Things began to turn around early in the third quarter when White completed a pass to Tony Hill, who raced past CB Vernon Dean for a 75-yard touchdown.

Shortly thereafter, White hit Hill again for another long scoring play, this time victimizing the inexperienced CB Anthony Washington in the secondary. Suddenly, the Washington lead was down to 23–17.

Still ahead by six points, the Redskins drove to the Dallas 14-yard line but were moved back by a holding penalty and then Moseley had a critical missed field goal attempt from 31 yards. Dallas responded by driving 80 yards – 27 coming on runs by Dorsett and aided by a late hit of White called on LB Mel Kaufman – and taking the lead with White running around end for a short TD, followed by Septién's extra point.

With just over two minutes to play, the game-clinching points were set up thanks to reserve CB Ron Fellows intercepting a Theismann pass at the Washington 40 and returning it to the four yard line. TE Doug Cosbie caught a touchdown throw by White from a yard out with less than two minutes to play.

The Redskins finally scored again in the waning seconds to close to one point, but it was inconsequential to the outcome once a desperation onsides kick was recovered by the Cowboys. Dallas came away with a 31–30 win.

Washington outgained the Cowboys (447 yards to 356) and had more first downs (26 to 16), but was also penalized seven times, to just two flags thrown on Dallas. Moreover, the inability to put more points on the board in the second half until it was too late, combined with the big plays by the Cowboys that exploited weaknesses in Washington's defense, made the difference.

Danny White, recovering from the horrible first half showing, ended up completing 9 of 20 passes for 193 yards and three touchdowns with no interceptions. Tony Dorsett (pictured below) rushed for 151 yards on 14 carries. With the two long scoring plays, Tony Hill gained 133 yards on 3 receptions while Doug Cosbie also caught 3 passes, for 36 yards and the clinching TD.

"That pass to Hill was the play that turned the game around", said Joe Theismann. "It didn’t kill us, but it woke up the Cowboys."

"Anytime I can look up here and see the stands half-empty and the fans grumbling on their way out, it's the most gratifying experience in football", said Dennis Thurman, who recovered the climactic onsides kick for the Cowboys that effectively ended the game. "Those fans were screaming ‘we want Dallas’. I’m not too sure they want us now."

Washington's opening defeat on Monday Night was easily overcome by the Redskins, who won the rematch in Dallas later in the season and lost only one other game in compiling a 14–2 record. Featuring their high-scoring offense, they again advanced to the Super Bowl, only to be upset by the Los Angeles Raiders. The Cowboys finished second in the NFC East but qualified for the playoffs as a Wild Card with a 12–4 tally. They didn’t make it to the NFC Championship game this time, falling to the Rams in the first round.

=== Week 2 ===
Team	1	2	3	4	Total
• Cowboys (2–0)	0	17	7	10	34
Cardinals (0–2)	10	0	0	7	17

- Date: September 11
- Location: Busch Stadium • St. Louis, Missouri
- Game start: 12:00 p.m.
- Game weather: 79 °F (26 °C), wind 10 mph
- Referee: Tom Dooley

Scoring summary
1	STL	Roy Green 39-yard pass from Jim Hart (Neil O'Donoghue kick)	Cardinals 7–0
1	STL	Neil O'Donoghue 23-yard field goal	Cardinals 10–0
2	DAL	Ron Springs 1-yard run (Rafael Septién kick)	Cardinals 10–7
2	DAL	Drew Pearson 10-yard pass from Danny White (Rafael Septién kick)	Cowboys 14–10
2	DAL	Rafael Septién 45-yard field goal	Cowboys 17–10
3	DAL	Ron Springs 19-yard run (Rafael Septién kick)	Cowboys 24–10
4	DAL	Dennis Thurman recovered fumble in end zone (Rafael Septién kick)	Cowboys 31–10
4	STL	Stump Mitchell 5-yard run (Neil O'Donoghue kick)	Cowboys 31–17
4	DAL	Rafael Septién 24-yard field goal	Cowboys 34–17

=== Week 3 ===
Team	1	2	3	4	Total
Giants (1–2)	3	0	10	0	13
• Cowboys (3–0)	0	14	0	14	28

- Date: September 18
- Location: Texas Stadium, Irving, Texas
- Game start: 3:00 p.m.
- Game weather: 82 °F (28 °C) • Wind 15
- Referee: Jerry Markbreit
- TV announcers (CBS): Pat Summerall and John Madden

Scoring summary
1	NYG	Ali Haji-Sheikh 31-yard field goal	Giants 3–0
2	DAL	Doug Cosbie 4-yard pass from Danny White (Rafael Septién kick)	Cowboys 7–3
2	DAL	Doug Cosbie 2-yard pass from Danny White (Rafael Septién kick)	Cowboys 14–3
3	NYG	Butch Woolfolk 1-yard run (Ali Haji-Sheikh kick)	Cowboys 14–10
3	NYG	Ali Haji-Sheikh 27-yard field goal	Cowboys 14–13
4	DAL	Dextor Clinkscale 68-yard interception return (Rafael Septién kick)	Cowboys 21–13
4	DAL	Michael Downs 10-yard fumble return (Rafael Septién kick)	Cowboys 28–13

=== Week 4 ===
Quarter	1	2	3	4	Total
Saints (2–2)	0	10	3	7	20
Cowboys (4–0)	7	6	0	8	21

at Texas Stadium

- Date: Sunday, September 25, 1983
- Game time: 1:00pm(ET)
- Game weather: 71 degrees, relative humidity 51, round(wind) 11.7 mph
- Referee: Pat Haggerty
- Pro-Football-Reference.com

Game information

First quarter

- Cowboys – Drew Pearson 4-yard pass from Danny White (Rafael Septién kick) – Cowboys 7–0

Second quarter

- Cowboys – Rafael Septién 41-yard field goal – Cowboys 10–0
- Saints – Morten Andersen 19-yard field goal – Cowboys 10–3
- Saints – Wayne Wilson 2-yard rush (Morten Andersen kick) – Cowboys 10–10
- Cowboys – Rafael Septién 34-yard field goal – Cowboys 13–10

Third quarter

- Saints – Morten Andersen 42-yard field goal – Cowboys 13–13

Fourth quarter

- Saints – Wayne Wilson 1-yard rush (Morten Andersen kick) – Saints 20–13
- Cowboys – Ron Fellows 62-yard blocked field goal return (Rafael Septién kick failed) – Saints 20–19
- Cowboys – LB Anthony Dickerson tackled Ken Stabler in the end zone – Cowboys 21–20

Vegas Spread

- Vegas Line=Dal −8.5
- Over/Under=46 (Under)

Flashback, Cowboys vs Saints – 1983

It wasn’t a game that will go down in Cowboys history. Actually, it wasn’t even a game that the Cowboys had any business winning. What the Texas Stadium crowd got in week 4 of the 1983 season was an ending that amazed even the players.

The Cowboys scored first when Danny White connected with Drew Pearson on four yard touchdown pass in the first quarter. The Cowboys followed that score with a Rafael Septién 41-yard field goal that gave them a 10–0 lead.

In the second quarter it would be the Saints that would battle back to tie the Cowboys. Saints kicker Morten Anderson kicked a 19-yard field goal. Then Saints running back Wayne Wilson scored on a two yard run to tie the game at 10–10.

Before halftime the Cowboys took the lead 13–10 when Rafael Septién kicked his second field goal of the game from 34 yards.

The Saints tied the game again with the only points of the third quarter. Morten Anderson kicked his second field goal of the game from 42 yards. The game was tied at 13–13 as the fourth quarter started and the fireworks were about to begin.

On the third play of the fourth quarter and the Cowboys sitting at their own three yard line, Coach Tom Landry reached into his bag of tricks. Danny White took the snap from center and threw a lateral to Drew Pearson who would look to throw and take the Saints by surprise. White's pass to Pearson was tipped, but still made it to Pearson. The tip interrupted the timing of Pearson's pass attempt to fellow wide receiver Doug Donley who was streaking down the left sideline.

Saints cornerback Johnnie Poe, who was covering Donley left coverage and ran towards Pearson. Poe hit Pearson's arm as he attempted his pass and the ball was then tipped high in the air by the Saints Frank Warren. Tony Elliot from the Saints jumped high to grab the ball, but he could only deflect it. The deflection went right back to Frank Warren who came down with the interception. Four plays later the Saints took their first lead of the game when Wayne Wilson scored from the one yard line. The Saints now led 20–13 with 12:35 left in the game.

The mistakes for the Cowboys continued on the kickoff as Ron Fellows fumbled the ball and the Saints recovered at the 20-yard line. The Saints were looking to add to their lead, but on 3rd and 12 Saints quarterback Kenny Stabler fumbled the ball from center and Cowboys Larry Bethea recovered.

The Cowboys could not take advantage of the turnover as Danny White added to the Cowboys fourth-quarter mistakes. White threw an interception that the Saints returned to the Cowboys 35-yard line. The Saints once again were looking to add to their 20–13 lead. On 4th and 1 Saints Coach Bum Phillips decided to go for the field goal.

As Morten Anderson attempted his 43-yard field goal, Cowboys Ed Jones got his hands on the ball for the block. Ron Fellows recovered the block on one hop and returned it 62 yards untouched for the touchdown.

"I wasn’t thinking anything but picking up the ball", Fellows said. "I knew it had to be six."

Rafael Septién looked to tie the game at 20–20 with the extra point, but the Saints Tyrone Young blocked the kick and the Cowboys remained behind 20–19 with 7:05 left in the game.

The Cowboys got the ball back at their 20-yard line with 4:30 left in the game. Four plays later the Cowboys were at their 49-yard line. Tony Dorsett took a pitch-out from Danny White as the Saints were blitzing. Dorsett broke free into an empty secondary and scored what the Cowboys thought was the go ahead touchdown from 49 yards out. But the officials ruled that Dorsett stepped out of bounds at the 15-yard line.

Danny White continued the drive as he looked to put the Cowboys back on top. White looked for Doug Donley over the middle at the goal line as he beat cornerback Johnnie Poe. But White never saw Saints linebacker Dennis Winston who intercepted White in the end Zone. Instead of taking a knee for the touchback Winston came out of the end zone. He managed to get to the five yard line before being tackled. The Saints offense took over with 2:07 left in the game and still holding onto a 20–19 lead.

All the Saints needed to do was run out the clock and they would improve to 3–1 on the season and hand the Cowboys their first loss of the season. On first down running back Wayne Wilson, who had scored twice in the game was tackled after gaining only one yard. On second down the Saints were looking to put some room between them and the goal line.

Kenny Stabler dropped back into the end zone looking for receiver Jeff Groth, but Everson Walls had him covered. This allowed Cowboys linebacker Anthony Dickerson who was blitzing to beat Wayne Wilson and sack Stabler for the safety. The Cowboys took the lead and won the game 21–20. It was the first time that a team losing by one point won by one point on a safety.

It was a game the Cowboys had no business winning as they turned the ball over six times and allowed seven sacks on Danny White. The lone bright spot for the Cowboys came from Tony Dorsett who rushed for 124 on 16 carries.

"I’ve never been in a game as bizarre as this one", Everson Walls said. "Were we lucky? That's an understatement."

"That was probably the most bizarre game I’ve ever been involved in", Dorsett said. "We did everything possible to lose the game, and we still won it."

"They deserved to win the game, there's no question about it", White said.

With the strange win by the Cowboys over the Saints they improved their record to 4–0 in 1983. The Cowboys would make a habit of coming from behind in the first half of the 1983 season as they built a 7–0 record with five come from behind wins. Their luck would end in week 8 as they fell to the L.A. Raiders 40–38.

=== Week 5 ===
Quarter	1	2	3	4	Total
Cowboys (5–0)	3	10	14	10	37
Vikings (3–2)	7	17	0	0	24

at Hubert H. Humphrey Metrodome

- Date: Sunday, October 2, 1983
- Game time: 1:00pm(ET)
- Game weather: 72, no wind
- Referee: Bob Frederic
- Pro-Football-Reference.com

Game information

First quarter

- Vikings – Sammy White 43-yard pass from Steve Dils (Benny Ricardo kick) – Dallas 0, Vik's 7
- Cowboys – Rafael Septién 45-yard field goal – Dallas 3, Vik's 7

Second quarter

- Vikings – Sammy White 36-yard pass from Steve Dils (Benny Ricardo kick) – Dallas 3, Vik's 14
- Vikings – Benny Ricardo 41-yard field goal – Dallas 3, Vik's 17
- Cowboys – Danny White 2-yard rush (Rafael Septién kick) – Dallas 10, Vik's 17
- Vikings – Ted Brown 5-yard rush (Benny Ricardo kick) – Dallas 10, Vik's 24
- Cowboys – Rafael Septién 45-yard field goal – Dallas 13, Vik's 24

Third quarter

- Cowboys – Ron Springs 5-yard rush (Rafael Septién kick) – Dallas 20, Vik's 24
- Cowboys – Ron Fellows 58-yard interception return (Rafael Septién kick) – Dallas 27, Vik's 24

Fourth quarter

- Cowboys – Drew Pearson 11-yard pass from Danny White (Rafael Septién kick) – Dallas 34, Vik's 24
- Cowboys – Rafael Septién 35-yard field goal – Dallas 37, Vik's 24

Vegas Spread

- Vegas Line= Dal −3.5
- Over/Under= 44.5 (Over)

Cowboys vs Vikings – 1983 The Cowboys went into the Metrodome in Minnesota with a 4–0 record early in the 1983 season. In the first four games of the season the Cowboys had to come from behind to win, this game against the Vikings would be no different.

The Vikings scored in the first quarter when Vikings quarterback Steve Dils went deep to wide receiver Sammy White. Everson Walls tripped as he was covering White, which allowed him to catch a 43-yard touchdown pass, giving the Vikings a 7–0 lead. The Cowboys answered the Vikings score with a Rafael Septién 45-yard field goal as the first quarter ended.

In the second quarter Steve Dils went back to Sammy White. This time White was covered by Dennis Thurman, but the result was the same as the first quarter. Another touchdown for White, this time from 36 yards out and a 14–3 Vikings lead. The Vikings would add a field goal to increase their lead to 17–3 before Cowboys quarterback Danny White recorded their first touchdown of the game.

Facing a fourth and one from the Vikings two yard line, Danny White took the ball himself and ran in for the touchdown to get the Cowboys closer, 17–10.

With 45 seconds left in the first half the Cowboys faced a third down from their own eight yard line. The exchange between center Tom Rafferty and Danny White was fumbled and the Vikings recovered at the five yard line. On the next play the Vikings Ted Brown scored and increased the Vikings lead to 24–10.

After the Vikings kicked off the Cowboys got the ball at their own 19-yard line with 40 seconds left in the half. Coach Tom Landry thought the safe thing to do was to run out the clock and regroup at halftime.

"It looked like the best thing was to get off the field with no more points being scored", Landry said.

Danny White had other ideas. Landry called in a running play for Tony Dorsett, but White did not agree and changed the play in the huddle.

"I was so confident we could move the ball", White said. "I didn’t want to sit on it."

White called for a pass to Doug Cosbie that could have gone for big yardage, but White overthrew Cosbie. It was clear that Landry was not happy with White changing the play and called for another running play to Dorsett.

"He was sending me a message", White said. "Actually, I got his message when I looked over to the sideline."

Tony Dorsett gained ten yards on the next play and it was almost like Landry realized what White wanted to do. The next four plays were passes and White completed three of them, gaining 54 yards. With the Cowboys sitting at the Vikings 28-yard line, Septién kicked his second 45-yard field goal to end the first half and to get the Cowboys to within 24–13.

"I like for my quarterbacks to have freedom", Landry said. "And we did end up with three points."

"It would have been a real mistake to run out the clock without trying to get a field goal", White said. "There were holes all over their defense. I knew we could move the ball. Sometimes you’ve got to react as a football player and do things on instinct."

Midway through the third quarter the Cowboys defense forced the Vikings to punt. Rod Hill returned the punt 37 yards to the Vikings 47-yard line. From there Danny White led the Cowboys to the Vikings five-yard line, where Ron Springs scored to make the score 24–20 Vikings.

After a Danny White interception, the Vikings found themselves at the Cowboys 47-yard line looking to increase their lead. The Cowboys decided to run their 4–0 blitz package. For those who don’t remember the Cowboys loved to run a package of four defensive linemen, no linebackers and seven defensive backs, blitzing most of their secondary. This package sometimes got the defense into trouble, but other times the defense would capitalize. In this case it would be Dennis Thurman who blitzed from the outside and was able to raise his arm to obstruct Steve Dils vision. The result was Ron Fellows stepping in front of his receiver for an interception and racing 58 yards for a touchdown. This gave the Cowboys their first lead of the game, 27–24 with a little over two minutes to go in the third quarter.

"That ball was like a Christmas present", Fellows said. "And if it's free, I’ll take it."

With the Cowboys defense controlling the Vikings offense in the second half. It was time for Dorsett to take control for the Cowboys offense. On a drive that consumed over six minutes, Dorsett had runs of 21 and 25 yards. From the Vikings 11-yard line White found Drew Pearson for an insurance score that increased the Cowboys lead to 34–24.

Tony Dorsett rushed for 141 yards against the Vikings despite dealing with a bruised thigh, bruised knee, sore ribs and a cracked bone in his right wrist.

"I was running for my life. I’m banged up all over my body", Dorsett said.

Rafael Septién added his third field goal of the game to close out the scoring and giving the Cowboys a 37–24 victory. The Cowboys outscored the Vikings 24–0 in the second half to improve their record to 5–0.

"It's a legitimate 5–0", Thurman said. "We can make plays like this all year and you’ll see us 14–2 or 15–1. The guys just don’t think they can lose. It's a feeling you get in the huddle and the locker room. When we left for the second half, we knew something would happen."

The Cowboys would push their record to 7–0 in 1983 before losing to the LA Raiders 40–38 in week 8. They would finish the season with a 12–4 record before losing in the first round of the playoffs to the LA Rams, 24–17.

=== Week 6 ===
Quarter	1	2	3	4	OT	Total
Buccaneers (0–6)	10	0	7	7	0	24
Cowboys (6–0)	7	7	3	7	3	27

at Texas Stadium

- Date: Sunday, October 9, 1983
- Game time: 4:00pm(ET)
- Game weather: 70 degrees, relative humidity 69, round(wind) 6.2 mph
- Referee: Bob McElwee
- TV announcers (CBS): Frank Glieber and Dick Vermeil
- Pro-Football-Reference.com

Game information

First quarter

- Buccaneers – Bill Capece 48-yard field goal – Bucs 3, Cowboys 0
- Cowboys – Ron Springs 80-yard pass from Danny White (Rafael Septién kick ) – Bucs 3, Cowboys 7
- Buccaneers – James Owens 9-yard pass from Jack Thompson (Bill Capece kick) – Bucs 10, Cowboys 7

Second quarter

- Cowboys – Timmy Newsome 1-yard rush (Rafael Septién kick) – Bucs 10, Cowboys 14

Third quarter

- Buccaneers – Gerald Carter 56-yard pass from Jack Thompson (Bill Capece kick) – Bucs 17, Cowboys 14
- Cowboys – Rafael Septién 41-yard field goal – Bucs 17, Cowboys 17

Fourth quarter

- Buccaneers – James Wilder Sr. 23-yard rush (Bill Capece kick) – Bucs 24, Cowboys 17
- Cowboys – Timmy Newsome 52-yard pass from Danny White (Rafael Septién kick) – Bucs 24, Cowboys 24

Over Time

- Cowboys – Rafael Septién 42-yard field goal – Bucs 24, Cowboys 27

Vegas Spread

- Vegas Line=Dal −13.0
- Over/Under=43.0 (Over)

=== Week 7 ===
Quarter	1	2	3	4	Total
Eagles (4–3)	7	0	0	0	7
Cowboys (7–0)	10	13	7	7	37

at Texas Stadium, Irving, Texas

- Date: October 16
- Game time: 4:00 p.m.
- Game weather: 73 degrees, relative humidity 70%, round(wind) 12.8 mph
- Referee: Jerry Seeman
- TV: CBS
- htm Pro-Football-Reference.com

Game information

First quarter

- Cowboys – Rafael Septién 31-yard field goal – Cowboys 3–0
- Eagles – Mike Quick 83-yard pass from Ron Jaworski (Tony Franklin kick) – Eagles 7–3
- Cowboys – Ron Springs 1-yard rush (Rafael Septién kick) – Cowboys 10–7

Second quarter

- Cowboys – Doug Cosbie 14-yard pass from Danny White (Rafael Septién kick) – Cowboys 17–7
- Cowboys – Rafael Septién 46-yard field goal – Cowboys 20–7
- Cowboys – Rafael Septién 34-yard field goal – Cowboys 23–7

Third quarter

- Cowboys – Tony Dorsett 7-yard rush (Rafael Septién kick) – Cowboys 30–7

Fourth quarter

- Cowboys – Timmy Newsome 2-yard pass from Danny White (Rafael Septién kick) – Cowboys 37–7

Vegas Odds

- Vegas Line= Dallas Cowboys −8.0
- Over/Under= 43.0 (over)

=== Week 8 ===
Quarter	1	2	3	4	Total
Raiders (6–2)	10	21	3	6	40
Cowboys (7–1)	7	17	0	14	38

at Texas Stadium, Irving, Texas

- Date: Sunday October 23, 1983
- Game time: 8:00 p.m.
- Game weather: 58 °F (14 °C), wind 9 mph
- Game attendance: 64,991
- Referee: Gene Barth
- TV announcers: Frank Gifford (play-by-play), Don Meredith & O. J. Simpson (color commentators)
- Pro-Football-Reference.com

Game information

First quarter

- DAL – Danny White 15-yard pass from Ron Springs (Rafael Septién kick) – Cowboys 7–0
- LA – Chris Bahr 37-yard field goal – Cowboys 7–3
- LA – Derrick Jensen 2-yard pass from Marc Wilson (Chris Bahr kick) – Raiders 10–7

Second quarter

- DAL – Ron Springs 2-yard run (Rafael Septién kick) – Cowboys 14–10
- DAL – Rafael Septién 23-yard field goal – Cowboys 17–10
- LA – Frank Hawkins 23-yard run (Chris Bahr kick) – Tied 17–17
- DAL – Butch Johnson 15-yard pass from Danny White (Rafael Septién kick) – Cowboys 24–17
- LA – Frank Hawkins 17-yard pass from Marc Wilson (Chris Bahr kick) – Tied 24–24
- LA – Todd Christensen 1-yard pass from Marc Wilson (Chris Bahr kick) – Raiders 31–24

Third quarter

- LA – Chris Bahr 24-yard field goal – Raiders 34–24

Fourth quarter

- DAL – Doug Donley 17-yard pass from Danny White (Rafael Septién kick) – Raiders 34–31
- DAL – Mike Hegman 9-yard fumble return (Rafael Septién kick) – Cowboys 38–34
- LA – Chris Bahr 26-yard field goal – Cowboys 38–37
- LA – Chris Bahr 26-yard field goal – Raiders 40–38

Raiders

- Marc Wilson
  26/49, 318 Yds, 3 TD, INT
- Frank Hawkins
  17 Rush, 118 Yds, TD
- Todd Christensen
  7 Rec, 90 Yds, TD

Cowboys

- Danny White
  19/38, 240 Yds, 2 TD, 2 INT
- Tony Dorsett
  20 Rush, 65 Yds
- Butch Johnson
  3 Rec, 54 Yds, TD

Vegas Spread

- Vegas Line=Dal −4.0
- Over/Under=46(Over)

=== Week 9 ===
Quarter	1	2	3	4	Total
Cowboys (8–1)	7	10	7	14	38
Giants (2–6–1)	7	7	6	0	20

at The Meadowlands

- Date: Sunday Oct 30, 1983
- Game time: 1:00pm(ET)
- Game weather: 43 degrees, relative humidity 49, round(wind) 14.5 mph (23 km/h)
- Referee: Fred Wyant
- TV announcers (CBS): Pat Summerall and John Madden
- Pro-Football-Reference.com

Game information

First quarter

- Giants – Zeke Mowatt 46-yard pass from Jeff Rutledge (Ali Haji-Sheikh kick) – Cowboys 0, Giants 7
- Cowboys – Tony Hill 21-yard pass from Danny White (Rafael Septién kick) – Cowboys 7, Giants 7

Second quarter

- Cowboys – Tony Dorsett 14-yard pass from Danny White (Rafael Septién kick) – Cowboys 14, Giants 7
- Cowboys – Rafael Septién 36-yard field goal – Cowboys 17, Giants 7
- Giants – Rob Carpenter 15-yard pass from Jeff Rutledge (Ali Haji-Sheikh kick) – Cowboys 17, Giants 14

Third quarter

- Giants – Ali Haji-Sheikh 27-yard field goal – Cowboys 17, Giants 17
- Cowboys – Doug Cosbie 61-yard pass from Danny White (Rafael Septién kick) – Cowboys 24, Giants 17
- Giants – Ali Haji-Sheikh 29-yard field goal – Cowboys 24, Giants 20

Fourth quarter

- Cowboys – Drew Pearson 7-yard pass from Danny White (Rafael Septién kick) – Cowboys 31, Giants 20
- Cowboys – Tony Hill 58-yard pass from Danny White (Rafael Septién kick) – Cowboys 38, Giants 20

Vegas Spread

- Vegas Line= Dal −7.0
- Over/Under= 43.5(Over)

=== Week 10 ===
Quarter	1	2	3	4	Total
Cowboys (9–1)	0	10	10	7	27
Eagles (4–6)	7	3	3	7	20

at Veterans Stadium

- Date: Sunday, November 6, 1983
- Game time: 1:00pm(ET)
- Game weather: 38 degrees, relative humidity 74, round(wind) 10.6 mph
- Referee: Fred Silva
- TV announcers (CBS): Pat Summerall and John Madden
- Pro-Football-Reference.com

Game information

First quarter

- Eagles – Mike Quick 20-yard pass from Ron Jaworski (Tony Franklin kick) – Cowboys 0, Eagles 7

Second quarter

- Eagles – Tony Franklin 19-yard field goal – Cowboys 0, Eagles 10
- Cowboys – Rafael Septién 39-yard field goal – Cowboys 3, Eagles 10
- Cowboys – Timmy Newsome 12-yard pass from Danny White (Rafael Septién kick) – Cowboys 10, Eagles 10

Third quarter

- Cowboys – Rafael Septién 23-yard field goal – Cowboys 13, Eagles 10
- Cowboys – Tony Dorsett 29-yard rush (Rafael Septién kick) – Cowboys 20, Eagles 10
- Eagles – Tony Franklin 37-yard field goal – Cowboys 20, Eagles 13

Fourth quarter

- Cowboys – Tony Hill 18-yard pass from Danny White (Rafael Septién kick) – Cowboys 27, Eagles 13
- Eagles – Glen Young 71-yard pass from Ron Jaworski (Tony Franklin kick) – Cowboys 27, Eagles 20

Vegas Spread

- Vegas Line=Cowboys −6.5
- Over/Under=45.0(Over)

=== Week 11 ===
Quarter	1	2	3	4	Total
Cowboys (9–2)	0	6	3	14	23
Chargers (4–7)	7	10	7	0	24

at Jack Murphy Stadium, San Diego, California

- Date: November 13
- Game time: 4:00 p.m.
- Game weather: 70 °F (21 °C), relative humidity 82%, round (wind) 11.4 mph
- Referee: Pat Haggerty
- TV announcers: Frank Glieber and Dick Vermeil
- Pro-Football-Reference.com

Game information

First quarter

- Chargers – Derrie Nelson 63-yard blocked punt return (Rolf Benirschke kick) – Chargers 7–0

Second quarter

- Chargers – Chuck Muncie 2-yard rush (Rolf Benirschke kick) – Chargers 14–0
- Cowboys – Drew Pearson 16-yard pass from Danny White (Rafael Septién kick failed) – Chargers 14–6
- Chargers – Rolf Benirschke 37-yard field goal – Chargers 17–6

Third quarter

- Chargers – Pete Holohan 18-yard pass from Ed Luther (Rolf Benirschke kick) – Chargers 24–6
- Cowboys – Rafael Septién 37-yard field goal – Chargers 17–9

Fourth quarter

- Cowboys – Tony Hill 35-yard pass from Danny White (Rafael Septién kick) – Chargers 24–16
- Cowboys – Billy Joe DuPree 4-yard pass from Danny White (Rafael Septién kick) – Chargers 24–23

Cowboys

- Danny White
  31/47, 300 Yds, 3 TD, 0 INT, 35 Lng
- Tony Dorsett
  17 Rush, 58 Yds, 0 TD, 12 Lng, 4 Rec, 20 Yds, 10 Lng
- Ron Springs
  10 Rush, 40 Yds, 0 TD, 15 Lng, 8 Rec, 45 Yds, 0 TD, 13 Long
- Drew Pearson
  5 Rec, 60 Yds, 1 TD, 16 Lng
- Doug Cosbie
  5 Rec, 52 Yds, 0 TD, 22 Lng
- Butch Johnson
  1 Rec, 20 Yds, 0 TD, 20 Lng
- Billy Joe Dupree
  1 Rec, 4 Yds, 1 TD, 4 Lng

Chargers

- Ed Luther
  26/43, 340 Yds, 1 TD, one interception, 30 Lng
- Chuck Muncie
  18 Rush, 30 Yds, 1 TD, 8 Lng, 4 Rec, 65 Yds, 27 Lng
- Charlie Joiner
  6 Rec, 86 Yds, 0 TD, 22 Lng
- Pete Holohan
  5 Rec, 84 Yds, 1 TD, 30 Lng
- Kellen Winslow
  5 Rec, 50 Yds, 0 TD, 24 Lng
- Wes Chandler
  5 Rec, 47 Yds, 0 TD, 20 Lng
- Earnest Jackson
  1 Rec, 8 Yds, 0 TD, 8 Lng

Vegas Spread

- Vegas Line=Dal −7.0
- Over/Under=45.5 (Over)

=== Week 12 ===
Team	1	2	3	4	Total
Chiefs (5–7)	0	0	14	7	21
• Cowboys (10–2)	10	10	7	14	41

- Date: November 20
- Location: Texas Stadium, Irving, Texas
- Game start: 3:00 p.m.
- Game weather: 54 degrees, relative humidity 49, round(wind) 17.6 mph
- Referee: Jerry Markbreit
- TV announcers (NBC): Dick Enberg and Merlin Olsen

Scoring summary
1	DAL	Ron Springs 1-yard run (Rafael Septién kick)	DAL 7–0
1	DAL	Rafael Septién 25-yard field goal	DAL 10–0
2	DAL	Tony Dorsett 28-yard run (Rafael Septién kick)	DAL 17–0
2	DAL	Rafael Septién 40-yard field goal	DAL 20–0
3	DAL	Tony Dorsett 32-yard run (Rafael Septién kick)	DAL 27–0
3	KC	Carlos Carson 13-yard pass from Bill Kenney (Nick Lowery kick)	DAL 27–7
3	KC	Carlos Carson 48-yard pass from Bill Kenney (Nick Lowery kick)	DAL 27–14
4	DAL	Timmy Newsome 7-yard run (Rafael Septién kick)	DAL 34–14
4	DAL	Gary Allen 68-yard punt return (Rafael Septién kick)	DAL 41–14
4	KC	Stephone Paige 7-yard pass from Todd Blackledge (Nick Lowery kick)	DAL 41–21

=== Week 13 ===
Quarter	1	2	3	4	Total
Cardinals (5–7–1)	7	0	3	7	17
Cowboys (11–2)	7	14	0	14	35

at Texas Stadium, Irving, Texas

- Date: Thursday, November 24, 1983
- Game time: 4:00pm(ET)
- Game weather: 43 degrees, relative humidity 61, round(wind) 8.0 mph
- Referee: Chuck Heberling
- TV announcers (CBS): Pat Summerall and John Madden
- Pro-Football-Reference.com

Game information

First quarter

- Cardinals – Roy Green 71-yard pass from Neil Lomax (Neil O'Donoghue kick) – Cards 7, Cowboys 0
- Cowboys – Ron Springs 1-yard rush (Rafael Septién kick) – Cards 7, Cowboys 7

Second quarter

- Cowboys – Tony Dorsett 5-yard rush (Rafael Septién kick) – Cards 7, Cowboys 14
- Cowboys – Butch Johnson 15-yard pass from Danny White (Rafael Septién kick) – Cards 7, Cowboys 21

Third quarter

- Cardinals – Neil O'Donoghue 42-yard field goal – Cards 10, Cowboys 21

Fourth quarter

- Cowboys – Tony Dorsett 55-yard rush (Rafael Septién kick) – Cards 10, Cowboys 28
- Cowboys – Danny White 4-yard rush (Rafael Septién kick) – Cards 10, Cowboys 35
- Cardinals – Ottis Anderson 14-yard pass from Neil Lomax (Neil O'Donoghue kick) – Cards 17, Cowboys 35

Vegas Spread

- Vegas Line= Dal −10.0
- Over/Under= 54.5 (Under)

=== Week 14 ===
Quarter	1	2	3	4	Total
Cowboys (12–2)	7	7	7	14	35
Seahawks (7–7)	0	3	0	7	10

at Seattle Kingdome

- Date: Sunday, December 4, 1983
- Game time: 4:00pm(ET)
- Game weather: 72%, no wind
- Referee: Jim Tunney
- TV announcers (CBS): Frank Glieber and Dick Vermeil
- Pro-Football-Reference.com

Game information

First quarter

- Cowboys – Tony Dorsett 8-yard rush (Rafael Septién kick) – Cowboys 7–0

Second quarter

- Cowboys – Tony Dorsett 7-yard rush (Rafael Septién kick) – Cowboys 14–0
- Seahawks – Norm Johnson 54-yard field goal – Cowboys 14–3

Third quarter

- Cowboys – Doug Donley 35-yard pass from Danny White (Rafael Septién kick) – Cowboys 21–3

Fourth quarter

- Cowboys – Butch Johnson 16-yard pass from Danny White (Rafael Septién kick) – Cowboys 28–3
- Seahawks – Curt Warner 2-yard rush (Norm Johnson kick) – Cowboys 28–10
- Cowboys – Timmy Newsome 15-yard pass from Gary Hogeboom (Rafael Septién kick) – Cowboys 35–10

Vegas Spread

- Vegas Line= Dal −6.0
- Over/Under= 55 (Under)

=== Week 15 ===
Quarter	1	2	3	4	Total
Redskins (13–2)	14	0	7	10	31
Cowboys (12–3)	7	3	0	0	10

at Texas Stadium

- Date: Sunday, December 11
- Game time: 4:00pm(et)
- Game weather: 58 degrees, relative humidity 47, round(wind) 18.6 mph
- Referee: Dick Jorgensen
- TV announcers (CBS): Pat Summerall and John Madden
- Pro-Football-Reference.com

Game information

First quarter

- Redskins – John Riggins 3-yard rush (Mark Moseley kick) – Redskins 7–0
- Redskins – Clint Didier 40-yard pass from Joe Theismann (Mark Moseley kick) – Redskins 14–0
- Cowboys – Doug Cosbie 29-yard pass from Danny White (Rafael Septién kick) – Redskins 14–7

Second quarter

- Cowboys – Rafael Septién 35-yard field goal – Redskins 14–10

Third quarter

- Redskins – Art Monk 43-yard pass from Joe Theismann (Mark Moseley kick) – Redskins 21–10

Fourth quarter

- Redskins – John Riggins 3-yard rush (Mark Moseley kick) – Redskins 28–10
- Redskins – Mark Moseley 23-yard field goal – Redskins 31–10

Vegas Spread

- Vegas Line=Dal −3.0
- Over/Under=53.5 (Under)

=== Week 16 ===
Quarter	1	2	3	4	Total
Cowboys (12–4)	3	7	0	7	17
49ers (10–6)	21	0	7	14	42

at Candlestick Park

- Date: Monday, December 19, 1983
- Game time: 9:00pm(ET)
- Game weather: 54 degrees, relative humidity 78, round(wind) 10.8 mph
- Referee: Bob McElwee
- TV announcers (ABC): Frank Gifford, Don Meredith and O. J. Simpson
- Pro-Football-Reference.com

Game information

First quarter

- 49ers – Roger Craig 6-yard pass from Joe Montana (Ray Wersching kick) – 49ers 7–0
- 49ers – Dana McLemore 56-yard punt return (Ray Wersching kick) – 49ers 14–0
- Cowboys – Rafael Septién 47-yard field goal – 49ers 14–3
- 49ers – Freddie Solomon 77-yard pass from Joe Montana (Ray Wersching kick) – 49ers 21–3

Second quarter

- Cowboys – Danny White 1-yard rush (Rafael Septién kick) – 49ers 21–10

Third quarter

- 49ers – Russ Francis 18-yard pass from Joe Montana (Ray Wersching kick) – 49ers 28–10

Fourth quarter

- Cowboys – Tony Hill 13-yard pass from Danny White (Rafael Septién kick) – 49ers 28–17
- 49ers – Eric Wright 48-yard interception return (Ray Wersching kick) – 49ers 35–17
- 49ers – Roger Craig 16-yard pass from Joe Montana (Ray Wersching kick) – 49ers 42–17

Vegas Spread

- Vegas Line=Pick
- Over/Under=44 (Over)

== Wild card playoffs ==
=== December 26, 1983 ===
==== NFC: Los Angeles Rams 24, Dallas Cowboys 17 ====
Game summary

Quarter	1	2	3	4	Total
Rams (10–7)	7	0	7	10	24
Cowboys (12–5)	0	7	3	7	17

at Texas Stadium, Irving, Texas

- Game time: 12:30 p.m. EST/11:30 a.m. CST
- Game weather: 27 °F (−3 °C), mostly cloudy
- Game attendance: 62,118
- Referee: Gordon McCarter
- TV announcers (CBS): Pat Summerall and John Madden

Game information
- Scoring
  - LA – D. Hill 18 pass from Ferragamo (Lansford kick) RAMS 7–0
  - DAL – T. Hill 14 pass from White (Septién kick) 7–7
  - DAL – field goal Septién 41 DAL 10–7
  - LA – Dennard 16 pass from Ferragamo (Lansford kick) RAMS 14–10
  - LA – Farmer 8 pass from Ferragamo (Lansford kick) RAMS 21–10
  - LA – field goal Lansford 20 RAMS 24–10
  - DAL – Cosbie 2 pass from White (Septién kick) RAMS 24–17

== Standings ==
NFC East
	W	L	T	PCT	DIV	CONF	PF	PA	STK
Washington Redskins^{(1)}	14	2	0	.875	7–1	10–2	541	332	W9
Dallas Cowboys^{(4)}	12	4	0	.750	7–1	10–2	479	360	L2
St. Louis Cardinals	8	7	1	.531	3–4–1	5–6–1	374	428	W3
Philadelphia Eagles	5	11	0	.313	1–7	4–10	233	322	L2
New York Giants	3	12	1	.219	1–6–1	3–8–1	267	347	L4

== Playoffs ==
Round	Date	Opponent	Result	Game Site	Attendance	Recap
Wild Card	December 26, 1983	Los Angeles Rams	L 17–24	Texas Stadium	43,521	Recap

== Awards ==
Five players represented the Cowboys in the 1984 Pro Bowl: Doug Cosbie, Tony Dorsett, Ed "Too Tall" Jones, Everson Walls, and Randy White. White and Walls were voted to the Associated Press' All-NFL first team, while Dorsett was voted to the AP's All-NFL second team.

== Publications ==
The Football Encyclopedia ISBN 0-312-11435-4
Total Football ISBN 0-06-270170-3
Cowboys Have Always Been My Heroes ISBN 0-446-51950-2
