= Timmy Newsome =

American football player (born 1958)

No. 30
- Position: Fullback

Personal information
- Born: May 17, 1958 (age 68); Ahoskie, North Carolina, U.S.
- Listed height: 6 ft 1 in (1.85 m)
- Listed weight: 232 lb (105 kg)

Career information
- High school: Ahoskie
- College: Winston-Salem State
- NFL draft: 1980: 6th round, 162nd overall pick

Career history
- Dallas Cowboys (1980–1988)

Awards and highlights
- 2× NAIA All-American (1978, 1979); NCAA All-American (1978); 3× CIAA Offensive Player of the Year (1977, 1978, 1979); 3× All-CIAA (1977, 1978, 1979)

Career NFL statistics
- Rushing yards: 1,226
- Rushing average: 3.6
- Receptions: 212
- Receiving yards: 1,966
- Touchdowns: 30
- Stats at Pro Football Reference

Timothy Arthur Newsome (born May 17, 1958) is an American former professional football player who was a fullback for the Dallas Cowboys of the National Football League (NFL). He played college football at Winston-Salem State University.

== Early life ==
Newsome attended Ahoskie High School, where he played safety and cornerback. As a sophomore in 1974, he helped the team achieve a 13–1 record and reach the State 3A Championship game.

As a senior, he was part of a defensive unit that yielded only 32 points during the season, with eight of those games being shutouts. He received All-conference honors in football, basketball, and baseball. He played on football teams that had a 32–5–1 record during a three-year period of time. He played in the North-South High School All-Star in 1976.

== College career ==
Newsome accepted a football scholarship from Winston-Salem State University. As a freshman, he was converted to a running back. As a sophomore in 1977, Newsome rushed for 998 yards and 14 touchdowns.

As a junior in 1978, he posted 1,377 rushing yards (second in Division II), a 7.5-yard average and 14 touchdowns. As a senior in 1979, he tallied 987 rushing yards and nine touchdowns.

The 1977 and 1978 football teams, which were coached by Bill Hayes, were two of the best teams in school history. They went undefeated each season and were led by Newsome and fellow running backs Arrington Jones and Randy Bolton, employing the Veer offense.

Those Rams teams dominated their competition. In 1977, they went 11–0 but bypassed the Division II playoffs to play in the Gold Bowl in Richmond, Virginia, where they lost to South Carolina State University 10–7. In 1978, they went 11–0 again, won their first playoff game (17–0 over California State Poly), then lost to Delaware State, 41–0 in the second round.

In his last three seasons, Newsome was the ClAA's leading rusher and scorer. He finished his college career as the leading rusher in school history with 3,843 yards (6.1-yard average) and 38 touchdowns. Newsome also was one of the leading all-time rushers in the history of the Central Intercollegiate Athletic Association (CIAA). In 1978 and 1979, he was named to the Sheridan All America Black College Football Team and was the Black College Football Offensive Player of the Year (1978).

In 1993, he was inducted into the CIAA Hall of Fame and the Winston-Salem State University Athletic Hall of Fame. In 2019, he was inducted into the Black College Football Hall of Fame. In 2022, he was inducted into the North Carolina Sports Hall of Fame.

== Professional career ==
Newsome was selected by the Dallas Cowboys in the sixth round (162nd overall) of the 1980 NFL draft. He made the roster by beating out Scott Laidlaw. Because the team already had Tony Dorsett as the starter at running back, as a rookie he was moved to fullback. He had 2 touchdowns against the San Diego Chargers.

In 1981, he suffered a severe hamstring pull on the first day of training camp, which limited his chances competing for the starting fullback job against Ron Springs.

In 1982, he was moved back to running back after two seasons of struggles, which prompted him to leave training camp for a few days. In a 24–10 win against the Washington Redskins he had an 18-yard touchdown run. In the 37–7 win against the Houston Oilers, he had a 43-yard reception and a 46-yard touchdown reception. In the 37–26 playoff win against the Green Bay Packers, he had 7 receptions for 70 yards and a two-yard touchdown run, while sharing fullback duties with Robert Newhouse in place of an injured Springs.

In 1983, he registered 185 rushing yards, 250 receiving yards and 6 touchdowns. In the 27–24 win against the Tampa Bay Buccaneers, he turned a short pass into a 52-yard touchdown to send the game into overtime with 47 seconds left. In 1984, he started at fullback in the last 4 games of the season.

In 1985, he started 14 games (missed 2 with injuries) at fullback after Springs was released. He had 88 carries for 252 yards, 46 receptions (tied for fourth on the team) for 361 yards (fifth on the team) and 3 touchdowns.

In 1986, he started 12 games at fullback, until making way for Herschel Walker to start alongside Dorsett late in the year. He teamed with Dorsett and Walker to form Tom Landry's latest offensive innovation - the full-house backfield. He also served as the third tight end. He finished with 48 receptions (third on the team) for 421 yards (fourth on the team), 34 carries for 110 yards and 5 touchdowns.

In 1987, he started 8 games at fullback, after Walker was given the team's main running back role. In a 17–27 loss against the Detroit Lions, he rushed for 2 touchdowns. In the 14–20 loss against the Miami Dolphins, he had 2 receptions for touchdowns.

In 1988, he had a promising start, but suffered a season-ending calf injury in a practice following the ninth game of the season. Through the first half, he led the team in rushing touchdowns with 3 and was on a pace for a career-high 53 receptions. He also moved into ninth place on the Cowboys All-time receiving list with 212 receptions.

In 1989, with the arrival of new head coach Jimmy Johnson, he was released as part of a youth movement on August 30. He spent most of his 9 seasons as a blocker and receiver out of the backfield, behind Cowboys legends Dorsett and Walker. He rushed for 1,226 yards with 19 rushing touchdowns and had 1,966 receiving yards with 11 receiving touchdowns.

During his career he became an all-purpose utility back, playing also snaps at tight end. In 1990, he was selected to the Dallas Cowboys all-decade team by the Dallas Cowboys Weekly Newspaper.

== NFL career statistics ==
Legend
**Bold**	Career high

=== Regular season ===
Year	Team	Games		Rushing					Receiving				
Year	Team	GP	GS	Att	Yds	Avg	Lng	TD	Rec	Yds	Avg	Lng	TD
1980	DAL	**16**	1	25	79	3.2	23	2	4	43	10.8	16	0
1981	DAL	15	0	13	38	2.9	7	0	0	0	0.0	0	0
1982	DAL	9	0	15	98	**6.5**	25	1	6	118	**19.7**	46	1
1983	DAL	**16**	0	44	185	4.2	20	2	18	250	13.9	**52**	**4**
1984	DAL	15	4	66	**268**	4.1	**30**	**5**	26	263	10.1	29	0
1985	DAL	14	**14**	**88**	252	2.9	15	2	46	361	7.8	24	1
1986	DAL	**16**	12	34	110	3.2	13	2	**48**	**421**	8.8	30	3
1987	DAL	11	8	25	121	4.8	24	2	34	274	8.1	30	2
1988	DAL	9	8	32	75	2.3	8	3	30	236	7.9	32	0
		121	47	342	1,226	3.6	30	19	212	1,966	9.3	52	11

=== Playoffs ===
Year	Team	Games		Rushing					Receiving				
Year	Team	GP	GS	Att	Yds	Avg	Lng	TD	Rec	Yds	Avg	Lng	TD
1980	DAL	**3**	0	**3**	**38**	**12.7**	**19**	0	0	0	0.0	0	0
1981	DAL	2	0	1	1	1.0	1	**1**	0	0	0.0	0	0
1982	DAL	**3**	0	1	2	2.0	2	**1**	**12**	**108**	9.0	**21**	**1**
1983	DAL	1	0	0	0	0.0	0	0	2	25	**12.5**	15	0
1985	DAL	1	**1**	1	3	3.0	3	0	3	10	3.3	7	0
		10	1	6	44	7.3	19	2	17	143	8.4	21	1
