= 1980 Dallas Cowboys season =

NFL team season

- Owner: Clint Murchison, Jr.
- General manager: Tex Schramm
- Head coach: Tom Landry
- Offensive coordinator: Dan Reeves
- Defensive coordinator: Ernie Stautner
- Home stadium: Texas Stadium

Results
- Record: 12–4
- Division place: 2nd NFC East
- Playoffs: Won Wild Card Playoffs (vs. Rams) 34–13; Won Divisional Playoffs (at Falcons) 30–27; Lost NFC Championship (at Eagles) 7–20

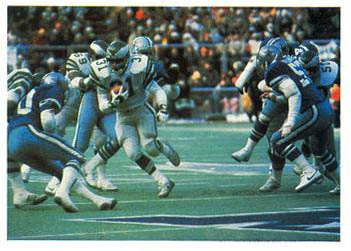
The Cowboys playing the Eagles in the 1980 NFC Championship Game

The 1980 Dallas Cowboys season was their 21st in the league. The team improved to 12-4 following Roger Staubach's retirement after the 1979 season. They qualified for the 1980 NFL postseason as an NFC Wild Card, yet ultimately lost in the Conference Championship game.

Going into the final week of the season, Dallas (11–4) played Philadelphia (12–3) at Texas Stadium. Under that season's NFL tiebreakers, Dallas had to beat the Eagles by 25 points or greater to win the NFC East, entering the NFC postseason as the number two seed while Philadelphia would be a wildcard team. The Eagles win NFC East should the Cowboys lose, tie or win by 24 points or fewer.

Dallas was leading the final regular season game 35–10 in the fourth quarter; however, the Eagles scored 17 unanswered points to pull within 35–27. Dallas had to play an extra week in the Wild Card round and as visitors in the following week road game in Atlanta in the Divisional Round. Dallas lost at Philadelphia in the NFC Championship Game.

== Offseason ==
=== NFL draft ===
1980 Dallas Cowboys draft
Round	Pick	Player	Position	College	Notes
3	78	Bill Roe	LB	Colorado	
3	80	James Jones	RB	Mississippi State	
4	105	Kurt Petersen	OG	Missouri	
5	133	Gary Hogeboom	QB	Central Michigan	
6	162	Timmy Newsome	FB	Winston-Salem State	
7	189	Lester Brown	RB	Clemson	
8	216	Larry Savage	LB	Michigan State	
9	246	Jackie Flowers	WR	Florida State	
10	273	Matthew Teague	LB	Prairie View A&M	
11	300	Gary Padjen	LB	Arizona State	
12	330	Norm Wells	DE	Northwestern	
Made roster † Pro Football Hall of Fame * Made at least one Pro Bowl during career

=== Undrafted free agents ===
1980 undrafted free agents of note
Player	Position	College
Mike Brock	Offensive Line	Alabama
Dextor Clinkscale	Safety	South Carolina State
Roy Dean	Wide receiver	Alabama
Anthony Dickerson	Linebacker	SMU
Mike Glenn	Offensive Line	Utah State
Richard Grimmett	Offensive tackle	Illinois
Jim Himic	Offensive Line	West Virginia
Jay Howlett	Defensive Line	Holy Cross
Kevin Kelly	Offensive Line	Duke
Bill Leer	Offensive Line	Colorado State
Mike Mancuso	Quarterback	Nebraska–Omaha
Don Smerek	Defensive end	Nevada
Roosevelt Smith	Running back	Michigan
Doug Woodward	Quarterback	Pace

== Roster ==
Dallas Cowboys 1980 roster
Quarterbacks: 18 Glenn Carano; 14 Gary Hogeboom; 11 Danny White P; Running backs: 33 Tony Dorsett; 23 James Jones; 44 Robert Newhouse; 30 Timmy Newsome; 26 Preston Pearson; 20 Ron Springs; Wide receivers: 80 Tony Hill; 86 Butch Johnson; 88 Drew Pearson; Tight ends: 84 Doug Cosbie; 89 Billy Joe DuPree; 87 Jay Saldi	Offensive linemen: 61 Jim Cooper T; 67 Pat Donovan T; 62 John Fitzgerald C; 71 Andy Frederick T; 65 Kurt Petersen G; 64 Tom Rafferty G; 68 Herbert Scott G; 52 Robert Shaw C; Defensive linemen: 76 Larry Bethea DT; 63 Larry Cole DT; 78 John Dutton DT; 72 Ed Jones DE; 79 Harvey Martin DE; 77 Bruce Thornton DE; 54 Randy White DT	Linebackers: 53 Bob Breunig MLB; 59 Guy Brown OLB; 51 Anthony Dickerson OLB; 58 Mike Hegman OLB; 57 Bruce Huther MLB; 50 D. D. Lewis OLB; 56 Bill Roe OLB; Defensive backs: 31 Benny Barnes CB; 47 Dextor Clinkscale SS; 42 Randy Hughes FS; 34 Aaron Mitchell CB; 32 Dennis Thurman FS; 41 Charlie Waters SS; 45 Steve Wilson CB; Special teams: 1 Rafael Septién K	Reserve lists: 75 Rich Grimmett T (IR); 22 Wade Manning CB (IR); 60 Don Smerek DE (IR); 66 Norm Wells G (IR); Rookies in italics 45 active, 4 inactive

== Schedule ==
Week	Date	Opponent	Result	Record	Game Site	Attendance	Recap
1	September 8	at **Washington Redskins**	**W** 17–3	1–0	RFK Stadium	55,045	Recap
2	September 14	at Denver Broncos	**L** 20–41	1–1	Mile High Stadium	74,919	Recap
3	September 21	Tampa Bay Buccaneers	**W** 28–17	2–1	Texas Stadium	62,750	Recap
4	September 28	at Green Bay Packers	**W** 28–7	3–1	Milwaukee County Stadium	54,776	Recap
5	October 5	**New York Giants**	**W** 24–3	4–1	Texas Stadium	59,126	Recap
6	October 12	San Francisco 49ers	**W** 59–14	5–1	Texas Stadium	63,399	Recap
7	October 19	at **Philadelphia Eagles**	**L** 10–17	5–2	Veterans Stadium	70,696	Recap
8	October 26	San Diego Chargers	**W** 42–31	6–2	Texas Stadium	60,639	Recap
9	November 2	at **St. Louis Cardinals**	**W** 27–24	7–2	Busch Memorial Stadium	50,701	Recap
10	November 9	at **New York Giants**	**L** 35–38	7–3	Giants Stadium	68,343	Recap
11	November 16	**St. Louis Cardinals**	**W** 31–21	8–3	Texas Stadium	52,567	Recap
12	November 23	**Washington Redskins**	**W** 14–10	9–3	Texas Stadium	58,809	Recap
13	November 27	Seattle Seahawks	**W** 51–7	10–3	Texas Stadium	57,540	Recap
14	December 7	at Oakland Raiders	**W** 19–13	11–3	Oakland–Alameda County Coliseum	53,194	Recap
15	December 15	at Los Angeles Rams	**L** 14–38	11–4	Anaheim Stadium	65,154	Recap
16	December 21	**Philadelphia Eagles**	**W** 35–27	12–4	Texas Stadium	62,548	Recap

Division opponents are in bold text

=== Game summaries ===
==== Week 1 at Redskins ====
Week One: Dallas Cowboys (0–0) at Washington Redskins (0–0)

Quarter	1	2	3	4	Total
**Cowboys**	7	3	0	7	**17**
Redskins	0	0	0	3	**3**

at RFK Stadium, Washington, D.C.

- Date: September 8
- Game time: 9:00 p.m. EST
- Game weather: 78 °F (26 °C)
- Game attendance: 55,045
- Referee: Gene Barth
- TV announcers (ABC): Frank Gifford, Don Meredith, and Howard Cosell
- Box Score

Game information

**First quarter**

- DAL – Tony Dorsett 6-yard run (Rafael Septién kick). Cowboys 7–0. Drive:

**Second quarter**

- DAL – Rafael Septién 19-yard field goal. Cowboys 10–0. Drive:

**Third quarter**

- No scoring

**Fourth quarter**

- WSH – Mark Moseley 45-yard field goal. Cowboys 10–3. Drive:
- DAL – Ron Springs 4-yard run (Rafael Septién kick). Cowboys 17–3. Drive:

Top passers

- DAL – Danny White – 10/18, 107 yards, 2 INT
- WSH – Joe Theismann – 19/34, 190 yards, INT

Top rushers

- DAL – Tony Dorsett – 17 rushes, 66 yards, TD
- WSH – Clarence Harmon – 7 rushes, 39 yards

Top receivers

- DAL – Tony Hill – 3 receptions, 69 yards
- WSH – Clarence Harmon – 7 receptions, 67 yards

==== Week 2 ====
Team	1	2	3	4	Total
Cowboys	0	10	3	7	20
• Broncos	7	17	14	3	41

- Date: September 14, 1980
- Location: Mile High Stadium
- Game start: 4:00 p.m. EST
- Game attendance: 74,919
- Game weather: Sunny; 67 °F (19 °C)
- Referee: Jerry Markbreit
- TV announcers (CBS): Lindsey Nelson and Sonny Jurgensen

==== Week 3 ====
Team	1	2	3	4	Total
Bucs	7	10	0	0	17
• Cowboys	7	7	7	7	28

- Date: Sunday Sept 21, 1980
- Location: Texas Stadium
- Game start: 4:00 p.m. EST
- Game weather: Sunny; 86 °F (30 °C)
- Referee: Chuck Heberling
- TV announcers (CBS): Pat Summerall and Tom Brookshier

==== Week 4 ====
Team	1	2	3	4	Total
• Cowboys	7	7	7	7	28
Packers	0	7	0	0	7

- Date: Sunday Sept 28, 1980
- Location: Milwaukee County Stadium
- Game start: 1:00 p.m. EST
- Game weather: 55 °F (13 °C); Wind 9 mph (14 km/h)
- Referee: Fred Silva

==== Week 5 ====
Team	1	2	3	4	Total
Giants	0	0	0	3	3
• Cowboys	3	14	0	7	24

- Date: Sunday Oct 5, 1980
- Location: Texas Stadium
- Game start: 4:00 p.m. EST
- Game weather: 69 °F (21 °C)

==== Week 6 ====
Team	1	2	3	4	Total
49ers	0	7	0	7	14
• Cowboys	14	24	14	7	59

- Date: Sunday Oct 12, 1980
- Location: Texas Stadium
- Game start: 2:00 p.m. EST
- Game weather: Sunny; 86 °F (30 °C)
- Referee: Pat Haggerty
- TV announcers (CBS): Frank Glieber and Roger Staubach

==== Week 7 ====
Team	1	2	3	4	Total
Cowboys	7	3	0	0	10
• Eagles	0	10	0	7	17

- Date: October 19
- Location: Veterans Stadium
- Game start: 1:00 p.m. EST
- Game attendance: 70,696
- Game weather: Sunny; 69 °F (21 °C)
- Referee: Cal Lepore
- TV announcers (CBS): Pat Summerall and Tom Brookshier

Scoring summary
Q1	DAL	Hegman recovered fumble in end zone (Septién kick)	DAL 7–0
Q2	PHI	Franklin 35 yard field goal	DAL 7–3
Q2	PHI	Carmichael 5 yard pass from Jaworski (Franklin kick)	PHI 10–7
Q2	DAL	Septién 33 yard field goal	Tie 10–10
Q4	PHI	Smith 15 yard pass from Jaworski (Franklin kick)	PHI 17–10

==== Week 8 ====
Team	1	2	3	4	Total
Chargers	3	21	0	7	31
• Cowboys	7	7	21	7	42

- Date: Sunday Oct 26, 1980
- Location: Texas Stadium
- Game start: 9:00 p.m. EST
- Game weather: Clear; 55 °F (13 °C)
- Referee: Dick Jorgensen
- TV announcers (ABC): Frank Gifford, Howard Cosell, and Don Meredith

==== Week 9 ====
Team	1	2	3	4	Total
• Cowboys	0	10	3	14	27
Cardinals	7	3	7	7	24

- Date: Sunday Nov 2, 1980
- Location: Civic Center Busch Memorial Stadium
- Game start: 2:00 p.m. EST
- Game weather: Clear; 49 °F (9 °C), wind 12 mph (19 km/h)
- TV announcers (CBS): Frank Glieber and Roger Staubach

==== Week 10 ====
Team	1	2	3	4	Total
Cowboys	7	14	14	0	35
• Giants	7	21	0	10	38

- Date: Sunday Nov 9, 1980
- Location: Giants Stadium
- Game start: 1:00 p.m. EST
- Game weather: Overcast; 44 °F (7 °C), wind 12 mph (19 km/h)
- Referee: Ben Dreith
- TV announcers (CBS): Frank Glieber and Roger Staubach

==== Week 11 ====
Team	1	2	3	4	Total
Cardinals	14	7	0	0	21
• Cowboys	7	10	7	7	31

- Date: Sunday Nov 16, 1980
- Location: Texas Stadium
- Game start: 2:00 p.m. EST
- Game weather: 44 °F (7 °C), wind 18 mph (29 km/h)
- TV announcers (CBS): Frank Glieber and Roger Staubach

==== Week 12 ====
Team	1	2	3	4	Total
Redskins	0	3	0	7	10
• Cowboys	7	0	0	7	14

- Date: Sunday Nov 23, 1980
- Location: Texas Stadium
- Game start: 4:00 p.m. EST
- Game weather: 47 °F (8 °C), wind 8 mph (13 km/h)
- Referee: Fred Silva
- TV announcers (CBS): Pat Summerall and Tom Brookshier

==== Week 13 ====
Team	1	2	3	4	Total
Seahawks	0	0	0	7	7
• Cowboys	9	21	0	21	51

- Date: Thursday Nov 27, 1980
- Location: Texas Stadium
- Game start: 4:00 p.m. EST
- Game weather: 40 °F (4 °C), wind 14 mph (23 km/h)
- Referee: Pat Haggerty
- TV announcers (NBC): Dick Enberg and Merlin Olsen

==== Week 14 ====
Team	1	2	3	4	Total
• Cowboys	7	9	3	0	19
Raiders	7	3	3	0	13

- Date: December 7
- Location: Oakland–Alameda County Coliseum, Oakland, California
- Game start: 1:00 p.m.
- Game attendance: 53,194
- Game weather: 48 °F (9 °C), wind 8 mph (13 km/h)
- Referee: Jerry Markbreit
- TV announcers (CBS): Pat Summerall and Tom Brookshier

Scoring summary
Q1	OAK	Raymond Chester 6 yard pass from Jim Plunkett (Chris Bahr kick)	OAK 7–0
Q1	DAL	Tony Dorsett 20 yard rush (Rafael Septién kick)	TIE 7–7
Q2	DAL	Rafael Septién 52 yard field goal	DAL 7–10
Q2	DAL	Ron Springs 2 yard rush	DAL 7–16
Q2	OAK	Chris Bahr 22 yard field goal	DAL 10–16
Q3	DAL	Rafael Septién 34 yard field goal	DAL 10–19
Q3	OAK	Chris Bahr 38 yard field goal	DAL 13–19

==== Week 15 ====
Team	1	2	3	4	Total
Cowboys	0	0	0	14	14
• Rams	7	21	10	0	38

- Date: Monday December 15, 1980
- Location: Anaheim Stadium, Anaheim, CA
- Game start: 9:00 p.m.
- Game weather: 60 °F (16 °C), wind 5 mph (8.0 km/h)
- Referee: Gene Barth
- TV announcers (ABC): Howard Cosell, Frank Gifford and Don Meredith

==== Week 16 ====
Team	1	2	3	4	Total
Eagles	0	0	10	17	27
• Cowboys	7	14	7	7	35

- Date: December 21
- Location: Texas Stadium, Irving, Texas
- Game start: 3:00 p.m.
- Game weather: 28 °F (−2 °C), wind 9 mph (14 km/h)
- Referee: Dick Jorgensen
- TV announcers (CBS): Pat Summerall and Tom Brookshier

Scoring summary
1	DAL	Danny White 1 yard run (Rafael Septién kick)	Cowboys 7–0
2	DAL	Tony Hill 36 yard pass from Danny White (Rafael Septién kick)	Cowboys 14–0
2	DAL	Preston Pearson 9 yard pass from Danny White (Rafael Septién kick)	Cowboys 21–0
3	PHI	Louie Giammona 1 yard run (Tony Franklin kick)	Cowboys 21–7
3	DAL	Drew Pearson 11 yard pass from Danny White (Rafael Septién kick)	Cowboys 28–7
3	PHI	Tony Franklin 29 yard field goal	Cowboys 28–10
4	DAL	Billy Joe DuPree 15 yard pass from Danny White (Rafael Septién kick)	Cowboys 35–10
4	PHI	Rodney Parker 30 yard pass from Ron Jaworski (Tony Franklin kick)	Cowboys 35–17
4	PHI	Tony Franklin 19 yard field goal	Cowboys 35–20
4	PHI	Wilbert Montgomery 6 yard run (Tony Franklin kick)	Cowboys 35–27

== Playoffs ==
Round	Date	Opponent	Result	Game Site	Attendance	Recap
Wild Card	December 28, 1980	Los Angeles Rams (5)	W 34–13	Texas Stadium	64,533	Recap
Divisional	January 4, 1981	at Atlanta Falcons (1)	W 30–27	Atlanta–Fulton County Stadium	60,022	Recap
NFC Championship	January 11, 1981	at Philadelphia Eagles (2)	L 7–20	Veterans Stadium	70,696	Recap

=== Wildcard Round ===
Team	1	2	3	4	Total
Rams	6	7	0	0	13
• Cowboys	3	10	14	7	34

- Date: December 28, 1980
- Location: Texas Stadium
- Game start: 1:30 p.m. EST
- Game attendance: 64,533
- Game weather: Sunny; 49 °F (9 °C)
- Referee: Pat Haggerty
- TV announcers (CBS): Gary Bender and John Madden

=== Divisional Round ===
Team	1	2	3	4	Total
• Cowboys	3	7	0	20	30
Falcons	10	7	7	3	27

- Date: Sunday Jan 4, 1981
- Location: Atlanta-Fulton County Stadium
- Game start: 4:00 p.m. EST
- Game attendance: 60,022
- Game weather: Sunny; 40 °F (4 °C)
- Referee: Fred Silva
- TV announcers (CBS): Vin Scully and George Allen

Scoring summary
Q1	ATL	Tim Mazzetti 38 yard field goal	ATL 7–0
Q1	ATL	Alfred Jenkins 60 yard pass from Steve Bartkowski (Tim Mazzetti kick)	ATL 10-0
Q1	Dal	Rafael Septién 38 yard field goal	ATL 10-3
Q2	DAL	Billy Joe DuPree 5 yard pass from Danny White (Rafael Septién kick)	Tie 10-10
Q2	ATL	Lynn Cain 1 yard rush (Tim Mazzetti kick)	ATL 17-10
Q3	ATL	William Andrews 12 yard pass from Steve Bartkowski (Tim Mazzetti kick)	ATL 24-10
Q4	DAL	Robert Newhouse 1 yard rush (Rafael Septién kick)	ATL 24-17
Q4	ATL	Tim Mazzetti 34 yard field goal	ATL 27-17
Q4	DAL	Drew Pearson 14 yard pass from Danny White (Rafael Septién kick)	ATL 27-24
Q4	DAL	Drew Pearson 23 yard pass from Danny White (Rafael Septién kick)	DAL 30-27

=== Conference Championship ===
Team	1	2	3	4	Total
Cowboys	0	7	0	0	7
• Eagles	7	0	10	3	20

- Date: January 11, 1981
- Location: Veterans Stadium
- Game start: 12:30 p.m. EST
- Game attendance: 70,696
- Game weather: Sunny; 17 °F (−8 °C)
- Referee: Jerry Markbreit
- TV announcers (CBS): Pat Summerall and Tom Brookshier

Scoring summary
Q1	PHI	Montgomery 42 yard run (Franklin kick)	PHI 7–0
Q2	DAL	Dorsett 3 yard run (Septién kick)	Tie 7–7
Q3	PHI	Franklin 26 yard field goal	PHI 10–7
Q3	PHI	Harris 9 yard run (Franklin kick)	PHI 17–7
Q4	PHI	Franklin 20 yard field goal	PHI 20–7

Veterans Stadium during the 1980 NFC Championship Game against the Dallas Cowboys, January 11, 1981.

== Standings ==
NFC East
	W	L	T	PCT	DIV	CONF	PF	PA	STK
Philadelphia Eagles^{(2)}	12	4	0	.750	6–2	9–3	384	222	L1
Dallas Cowboys^{(4)}	12	4	0	.750	6–2	9–3	454	311	W1
Washington Redskins	6	10	0	.375	4–4	5–7	261	293	W3
St. Louis Cardinals	5	11	0	.313	2–6	4–10	299	350	L2
New York Giants	4	12	0	.250	2–6	3–9	249	425	L2
