= Rafael Septién =

American football player (born 1953)

No. 1
- Position: Placekicker

Personal information
- Born: December 12, 1953 (age 72); Mexico City, Mexico
- Listed height: 5 ft 10 in (1.78 m)
- Listed weight: 176 lb (80 kg)

Career information
- High school: Colegio Vista Hermosa (Mexico)
- College: Southwestern Louisiana
- NFL draft: 1977: 10th round, 258th overall pick

Career history
- New Orleans Saints (1977)*; Los Angeles Rams (1977); Dallas Cowboys (1978–1986); Denver Broncos (1989)*
- * Offseason or practice squad member only

Awards and highlights
- First-team All-Pro (1981); Pro Bowl (1981); NFL scoring leader (1981); PFWA All-Rookie Team (1977); UPI NFL All-Rookie Team (1977); PFW Golden Toe Award (1981); 2× All-Southland Conference (1975, 1976)

Career NFL statistics
- Games played: 151
- Field goals: 180 / 256
- Field goal %: 70.3
- Extra points: 420 / 433
- Stats at Pro Football Reference

José Rafael Septién Michel (born December 12, 1953) is a Mexican-American former placekicker in the National Football League (NFL) for the Los Angeles Rams and Dallas Cowboys. He played college football at the University of Louisiana at Lafayette.

== Early life ==
Rafael Septién's father, Carlos, was a professional soccer player in Mexico, who played for the national football team in the 1950 and 1954 FIFA World Cups. He looked to follow in his steps by joining Club América's youth system.

A friend told him that the University of Southwestern Louisiana needed a kicker, so he walked-on to the football team after a tryout. He experienced success from the start of his football career. On October 5, 1974, he kicked a 57-yard field goal, breaking Gerald Landry's 1963 school record. In 1975 and 1976, he received first team Southland Conference honors.

Septién had a remarkable college career, finishing as the University of Louisiana at Lafayette all-time leading kicker and breaking many of the school's records, some of which still stand today:

- Most field goals made in a game: 5 vs. San Jose State University (1974).
- Most points a game: 16 vs. San Jose State University (1974).
- Most field goals attempted in a game: 6 vs. San Jose State University (1974).
- Most field goals made in a season: 26 (1974).
- Longest field goal: 57 yards vs. Lamar University (1974).
- Most 50+ yard field goals in a season: 4 (1974).
- Most 50+ yard field goals in a career: 9 (1974–1976).
- Most 50+ yard field goals in a season: 4 (1974).
- Most 50+ yard field goals in a game: 2 vs. Lamar University (1974).

== Professional career ==
=== New Orleans Saints ===
Septién was selected by the New Orleans Saints in the tenth round (258th overall) of the 1977 NFL draft. He was waived on August 31.

=== Los Angeles Rams ===
On September 16, 1977, Septién was signed as a free agent by the Los Angeles Rams. He made 18 out of 30 field goals; his 60% average ranked fourth best in the NFC and he was named to the All-rookie team. On August 28, 1978, Septién was released after the final pre-season game to make room for third round draft choice Frank Corral, who would go on to have a standout rookie year.

=== Dallas Cowboys ===
On August 30, 1978, Septién was signed as a free agent by the Dallas Cowboys, who only had rookie kicker Jay Sherrill on the roster after All-Pro Efren Herrera was traded to the Seattle Seahawks because of a contract holdout. He showed a strong leg for kickoffs and was second in scoring in the NFC. He also played in Super Bowl XIII, making a 27-yard field goal in the third quarter and scoring four PATs, in a 35–31 loss to the Pittsburgh Steelers.

In 1979, Septién finished third in scoring in the NFC. In 1980, he set a franchise record with 59 extra points and was fifth in scoring in the NFC.

In 1981, Septién received All-Pro and Pro Bowl honors at the end of the season, after tying Eddie Murray for the league lead with franchise records for 121 points, 27 field goals, and nine straight field goals made. He became the Cowboys' all-time career field goal leader with 73.

In 1982, Septién became the team's all-time leading scorer, breaking Bob Hayes' previous mark of 456 points. He also made a career-long 53-yard field goal against the Houston Oilers. His 50-yard field goal against the Green Bay Packers tied Garo Yepremian for the second longest in playoff history.

In 1983, Septién broke his own Cowboys' scoring record with 123 points (fifth in the NFL) and his 81.5 percent field goal average broke Herrera's team season mark of 78.3 percent.

In 1985, Septién was limited with a back injury. He missed the second half of a playoff loss to the Los Angeles Rams with a pulled muscle in his right leg.

On April 8, 1987, Septién was indicted after pleading guilty to a charge of indecency with a child and received a 10-year probated sentence. On April 15, he was released by the team and later replaced with Roger Ruzek.

Septién led the Cowboys in scoring in each of his nine seasons with the team, making 162 field goals in 226 attempts and scoring 388 PATs. He left as the fourth most accurate field goal kicker in league history, the eighteenth all-time scoring leader (first in franchise history) with 874 points and his 91 percent field goal accuracy in the playoffs was the best in league history. He was named to the Cowboys' 40th anniversary team in 2000.

=== Denver Broncos ===
On June 14, 1989, Septién was signed as a free agent by the Denver Broncos after being out of football for two years, but was waived on August 29.

== Career regular season statistics ==
Career high/best bold

Season	Team	G	FGM	FGA	%	LNG	XPM	XPA	%	PTS
1977	RAM	14	18	30	60.0	45	32	35	91.4	86
1978	DAL	16	16	36	61.5	48	46	47	97.9	94
1979	DAL	16	19	29	65.5	51	40	44	90.9	97
1980	DAL	16	11	17	64.7	52	59	60	98.3	92
1981	DAL	16	27	35	77.1	47	40	40	100.0	121
1982	DAL	9	10	14	71.4	53	28	28	100.0	58
1983	DAL	16	22	27	81.5	47	57	59	96.6	123
1984	DAL	16	23	29	79.3	52	33	34	97.1	102
1985	DAL	16	19	28	67.9	53	42	43	97.7	99
1986	DAL	16	15	21	71.4	50	43	43	100.0	88
Career		151	180	256	70.3	53	420	433	97.0	960

== Personal life ==
On January 22, 1987, a Denton County, Texas grand jury indicted Septién on a charge of mishandling a minor. He pleaded guilty on April 8, to a charge of indecency with a child sexual Contact in an agreement with prosecutors that brought him a sentence of ten years of adjudicated probation and a $2,000 fine. He was released by the Cowboys a week later. His probation is in Felony warrant status as of January 16, 1992; and is still active as of March 6, 2026.
