= Billy Joe DuPree =

American football player (born 1950)

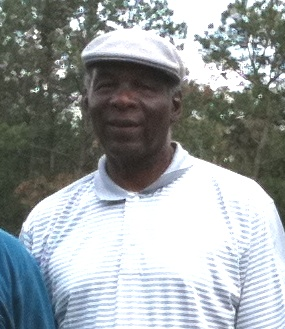

No. 89
- Position: Tight end

Personal information
- Born: March 7, 1950 (age 76); Monroe, Louisiana, U.S.
- Listed height: 6 ft 4 in (1.93 m)
- Listed weight: 225 lb (102 kg)

Career information
- High school: West Monroe (LA) Richardson
- College: Michigan State
- NFL draft: 1973: 1st round, 20th overall pick

Career history
- Dallas Cowboys (1973–1983)

Awards and highlights
- Super Bowl champion (XII); 3× Pro Bowl (1976, 1977, 1978); Second-team All-American (1972); 2× Second-team All-Big Ten (1971, 1972)

Career NFL statistics
- Receptions: 267
- Receiving yards: 3,565
- Receiving touchdowns: 41
- Stats at Pro Football Reference

Other information
- Relatives: Tyler Dupree (nephew)

Billy Joe DuPree (born March 7, 1950) is an American former professional football player who was a tight end in the National Football League (NFL) for the Dallas Cowboys. He played college football at Michigan State University.

== Early life ==
DuPree was born and raised in Monroe, Louisiana. He played high school football at Richardson High School in West Monroe, Louisiana. He began playing as a two-way tackle. As a senior, he was switch to tight end on the offense.

He contributed to the team reaching the Class 2A State Championship in the 3 years he played, helping the school win two of them (1966–67 and 1967–68). He also played basketball.

== College career ==
DuPree played collegiately at Michigan State University. He is recognized as the greatest tight end in Michigan State history, even though he had few opportunities to prove his true worth in the Spartans run-oriented offense.

As a sophomore, he was named the starter at tight end. He ranked second on the team with 21 receptions for 402 receiving yards, a 19.1-yard average and 3 receiving touchdowns.

As a junior, wide receiver Gordon Bowdell left for the NFL and Dupree took over as the leader of the passing offense. He led the team with 25 catches for 414 yards and 3 receiving touchdowns.

As a senior, he was one of the team's co-captains and started all 11 games. Although the Spartans ran the Wishbone T offense and he was required to focus mainly on blocking, in a team that only completed a total of 44 passes, his 23 catches for 406 yards were enough to get him noticed for All-American honors. He didn't record any touchdowns during the season.

DuPree was the last tight end to lead Michigan State University in receiving, doing it in each of his last 2 seasons. He finished his collegiate career with 69 receptions (third in school history, 1,222 receiving yards, a 17.7-yard average and 6 receiving touchdowns. He also played basketball for a season, before deciding to focus on football.

== Professional career ==
DuPree was selected by the Dallas Cowboys in the first round (20th overall) of the 1973 NFL draft. As a rookie, he became an immediate starter, which at the time was almost unheard-of in a Tom Landry-coached team. He also had to take over for the recently retired and future hall of famer Mike Ditka, who gave him his jersey number 89. He led the team in receiving yards (392) and was second in catches (29) and receiving touchdowns (5). He set a franchise record for tight ends with 3 touchdowns catches in a single game against the St. Louis Cardinals.

In 1974, he posted 29 receptions (third on the team), 466 yards (third on the team) and 4 receiving touchdowns (second on the team). He improved in the second half of the season, when he made 20 catches for 360 yards and 4 touchdowns in the last 7 contests.

In 1975, he was hampered by injuries (including a broken finger) and although he played in all 14 games he only had 6 starts. He was passed on the depth chart by Jean Fugett and tallied only 9 receptions for 138 yards and one touchdown.

In 1976, Fugett left under free agency and Dupree regained his starting position. He had 42 catches which was a franchise record for tight ends and good for second on the team. He also compiled 680 receiving yards (second on the team) and 2 receiving touchdowns (tied for third on the team). He was named to the first of three consecutive Pro Bowls.

In 1977, the Cowboys increased his blocking responsibilities and his stats suffered. He made 28 receptions (fourth on the team) for 347 yards (third on the team) and 3 receiving touchdowns (tied for second on the team). He still was voted the starter at tight end for the NFC squad in the Pro Bowl.

He assisted his team to a 27–10 victory over the Denver Broncos in Super Bowl XII as the game's top receiver (four catches for 66 yards). He also played in Super Bowl X and scored a touchdown in Super Bowl XIII; in both games the Cowboys lost against the Pittsburgh Steelers.

Even though tight ends during his era were expected to block more than feature their receiving skills, his 41 career touchdown receptions was the Cowboys record for tight ends until it was broken in 2012 by Jason Witten.

In the 1982 season, he helped block on Tony Dorsett's record 99-yard touchdown run against the Minnesota Vikings. He announced his retirement on March 16, 1984.

Known as a superb blocker and pass receiver, DuPree was one of the top tight ends of his era. He caught 267 passes for 3,565 yards and 42 touchdowns while also rushing for 178 yards and a touchdown on 28 carries.

DuPree never missed a game in his 11 seasons in the league and was part of the franchise's legacy of Pro Bowl tight ends that includes: Jim Doran, Dick Bielski, Lee Folkins, Mike Ditka, Jay Saldi, Doug Cosbie, Jay Novacek and Jason Witten. He was also a Cowboys co-captain and recognized as the team's NFL Man of the Year.

== NFL career statistics ==
Legend
	Won the Super Bowl
**Bold**	Career high

=== Regular season ===
Year	Team	Games		Receiving				
Year	Team	GP	GS	Rec	Yds	Avg	Lng	TD
1973	DAL	14	14	29	392	13.5	40	5
1974	DAL	14	13	29	466	16.1	**42**	4
1975	DAL	14	6	9	138	15.3	28	1
1976	DAL	14	14	**42**	**680**	**16.2**	38	2
1977	DAL	14	14	28	347	12.4	23	3
1978	DAL	**16**	**16**	34	509	15.0	38	**9**
1979	DAL	**16**	**16**	29	324	11.2	33	5
1980	DAL	**16**	**16**	29	312	10.8	39	7
1981	DAL	**16**	15	19	214	11.3	33	2
1982	DAL	9	1	7	41	5.9	12	2
1983	DAL	**16**	6	12	142	11.8	28	1
		159	131	267	3,565	13.4	42	41

=== Playoffs ===
Year	Team	Games		Receiving				
Year	Team	GP	GS	Rec	Yds	Avg	Lng	TD
1973	DAL	2	2	2	22	11.0	20	0
1975	DAL	**3**	0	1	17	17.0	17	0
1976	DAL	1	1	3	34	11.3	16	0
1977	DAL	**3**	**3**	6	110	**18.3**	**28**	1
1978	DAL	**3**	**3**	**10**	**124**	12.4	24	**2**
1979	DAL	1	1	2	26	13.0	17	0
1980	DAL	**3**	**3**	4	36	9.0	19	1
1981	DAL	2	2	6	37	6.2	13	0
1982	DAL	**3**	0	4	32	8.0	11	0
1983	DAL	1	0	1	9	9.0	9	0
		22	15	39	447	11.5	28	4

== Personal life ==
More recently, he has become involved in many charities, including the Shriner's, as well as other inner city youth groups. He is an active participant in most NFL Alumni Children's Charity events.

He was elected into the MSU Athletics Hall of Fame, the Blue–Gray Football Classic Hall of Fame, the Louisiana Sports Hall of Fame and the Texas State African-American Sports Hall of Fame. He is an active member of the Board of Trustees of Meals on Wheels of Collin County.

DuPree is great uncle to English rugby league footballer Tyler Dupree who plays for the Castleford Tigers in the Super League.

== See also ==
- Louisiana Sports Hall of Fame
