= Thornton Chandler =

American football player (born 1963)

No. 85, 89
- Position: Tight end

Personal information
- Born: November 27, 1963 (age 62); Jacksonville, Florida, U.S.
- Listed height: 6 ft 5 in (1.96 m)
- Listed weight: 243 lb (110 kg)

Career information
- High school: William M. Raines (Jacksonville)
- College: Florida A&M, Alabama
- NFL draft: 1986: 6th round, 140th overall pick

Career history
- Dallas Cowboys (1986–1989); New York Giants (1990)*
- * Offseason or practice squad member only

Career NFL statistics
- Receptions: 29
- Receiving yards: 268
- Touchdowns: 4
- Stats at Pro Football Reference

Thornton Chandler (born November 27, 1963) is an American former professional football player who was a tight end in the National Football League (NFL) for the Dallas Cowboys. He played college football for the Alabama Crimson Tide.

== Early life ==
Chandler attended William M. Raines High School, where he was switched from wide receiver to tight end, after he grew up to 6–5 feet and 240 pounds as a freshman. As a senior he received All-American honors. Against Lake City High School, he had 10 receptions for 170 yards and 2 touchdowns. He received All-City honors twice, even though he was mostly a blocker in his team's wishbone offense, finishing his career with 29 receptions and 4 touchdowns.

As a freshman at Florida A&M University, he played the flanker and tight end positions, before deciding to transfer to the University of Alabama after just two games.

At Alabama he was named the starter in 1983 and became an accomplished blocking tight end in the team's run-oriented offense. In 1985, he was the team's third-leading receiver, registering 16 receptions for 244 yards. In 32 games, he posted 32 receptions for 504 yards (15.8-yard average) and 2 touchdowns.

== Professional career ==
=== Dallas Cowboys ===
Chandler was selected by the Dallas Cowboys in the sixth round (140th overall) of the 1986 NFL draft. As a rookie, his first 2 receptions went for touchdowns. He was Doug Cosbie’s backup for two years, until earning the starting job in the fifth game of the 1988 season.

The next year Thornton broke his wrist playing basketball, before the start of training camp which affected his play. This resulted in losing his starting job to Steve Folsom and eventually being waived on October 18, 1989. In three-plus seasons, Thornton was mostly known for his blocking ability. He recorded 29 receptions for 268 yards and 4 touchdowns.

=== New York Giants ===
On April 12, 1990, the New York Giants signed Chandler as a free agent, but he was released before the start of the season.

== Personal life ==
Chandler was the director of the Boys & Girls Club in Deerfield Beach, Florida. He also serves as a football assistant coach at Anthony Aguirre Middle School in Houston, Texas. His son Kolby was on the 13th season of USA version of MasterChef.
