= Johnny Holloway =

American football player (born 1963)

No. 23, 29, 6
- Position: Cornerback

Personal information
- Born: November 8, 1963 (age 62); Galveston, Texas, U.S.
- Listed height: 5 ft 11 in (1.80 m)
- Listed weight: 181 lb (82 kg)

Career information
- High school: Lamar (Houston, Texas)
- College: Kansas
- NFL draft: 1986: 7th round, 185th overall pick

Career history
- Dallas Cowboys (1986); St. Louis Cardinals (1987); Seattle Seahawks (1988)*; BC Lions (1989)
- * Offseason or practice squad member only

Career NFL statistics
- Interceptions: 1
- Fumble recoveries: 1
- Stats at Pro Football Reference

Johnny Owen Holloway (born November 8, 1963) is an American former professional football player who was a cornerback in the National Football League (NFL) for the Dallas Cowboys and St. Louis Cardinals. He played college football for the Kansas Jayhawks.

== Early life ==
Holloway attended Lamar High School, where he played wide receiver and defensive back. As a senior, he was considered one of the top three defensive back in the state of Texas. He also practiced track and was the state's long jump champion with a 24-8 leap as a junior.

He accepted a football scholarship from Northwestern University, where as a freshman he played in 11 games, posting 8 receptions for 122 yards. At the end of the year, he transferred to Butler Community College, where he led the nation in average yards per reception with 31 in 1983.

In 1984, he transferred to the University of Kansas, where he was named the starter at wide receiver, but was redshirted after suffering an ankle injury in the third game of the season. Before the injury he was averaging 18.1 yards per reception and had 6 receptions for 141 yards including a 70-yard touchdown against Florida State University. He played 3 games, making 13 receptions for 235 yards and 2 touchdowns.

The next year, he was viewed as the strongest and fastest wide receiver on the team, but was limited by a knee injury he suffered in the season opener against the University of Hawaii. He played in 10 games, while registering 32 receptions for 358 yards and ranked fourth in receiving in the Big Eight Conference.

He was declared eligible for the NFL draft after his junior season.

== Professional career ==
=== Dallas Cowboys ===
Holloway was selected by the Dallas Cowboys in the seventh round (185th overall) of the 1986 NFL draft, with the intention of converting him into a cornerback. He was expected to start at right cornerback in the season opener, in case Everson Walls missed any games during his contract holdout.

He played mainly on special teams and nickel back in some games, covering the opponent's third wide receiver in passing situations. His only career interception came against the St. Louis Cardinals in a Monday Night Football game. He also registered 15 defensive tackles and 4 passes defensed. He was waived on September 7, 1987 .

=== St. Louis Cardinals ===
Holloway was claimed off waivers by the St. Louis Cardinals on September 8, 1987, but failed his physical.

He was re-signed on November 11 for depth purposes. He replaced an injured Cedric Mack (ankle) against the Washington Redskins, but gave up an 84-yard touchdown reception to Gary Clark and was released on December 9, 1987.

=== Seattle Seahawks ===
On May 11, 1988, he signed with the Seattle Seahawks as a free agent. He was released before the start of the season.
