= Ron Springs =

American football player (1956–2011)

No. 20
- Position: Running back

Personal information
- Born: November 4, 1956; Williamsburg, Virginia, U.S.
- Died: May 12, 2011 (aged 54); Dallas, Texas, U.S.
- Listed height: 6 ft 0 in (1.83 m)
- Listed weight: 213 lb (97 kg)

Career information
- High school: Williamsburg (VA) Lafayette
- College: Ohio State
- NFL draft: 1979: 5th round, 136th overall pick

Career history
- Dallas Cowboys (1979−1984); Tampa Bay Buccaneers (1985−1986)

Awards and highlights
- First-team All-Big Ten (1977)

Career NFL statistics
- Rushing yards: 2,519
- Rushing average: 3.6
- Rushing touchdowns: 28
- Stats at Pro Football Reference

Ronald Edward Springs (November 4, 1956 – May 12, 2011) was an American professional football running back in the National Football League (NFL) for the Dallas Cowboys and Tampa Bay Buccaneers. He played college football at Ohio State University.

== Early life ==
Springs attended Lafayette High School, where he played football alongside Hall of Fame linebacker Lawrence Taylor, and one of the best return specialists in NFL history in Mel Gray. As a senior in 1974, he rushed for a then-Peninsula District-record 1,876 yards, including 315 yards in one game.

In 1975, he enrolled at Coffeyville Community College to improve his grades. As a freshman, he rushed for 1,800 yards and 25 touchdowns. He was named Junior College player of the year.

The following year, he transferred to Ohio State University to play under head coach Woody Hayes. Playing behind Jeff Logan, he registered 389 rushing yards (fourth on the team), a 5.4-yard average and two touchdowns.

As a junior, he became a starter after Logan injured his ankle in the season opener against the University of Miami and recorded 113 rushing yards and one touchdown. He would end up leading the team in both rushing (1,166 yards, 5.8-yard average) and receptions (16 catches for 90 yards). He also led the Big Ten Conference in rushing. He had runs of 72 yards against Northwestern University and 66 yards against Purdue University. He was the last Buckeye with less than 100 yards receiving on a season to lead the team in receptions.

Springs was elected a team co-captain as a senior. He was limited with a knee injury he suffered in the third game against Baylor University. He collected 585 rushing yards (third on the team), a 4.7-yard average and two touchdowns. He finished his college career with 2,140 rushing yards, 11 rushing touchdowns, and 168 receiving yards. He also ran sprint relays for the track team.

In 2003, he was among the first inductees into the Lafayette High School Athletic Hall of Fame.

== Professional career ==
=== Dallas Cowboys ===
Springs was selected by the Dallas Cowboys in the fifth round (136th overall) of the 1979 NFL draft, after he dropped because of a poor senior year. As a rookie, he was the backup for Tony Dorsett and played on special teams. In the season-opener 22–21 win against the St. Louis Cardinals, he rushed for 30 yards, had 2 catches and threw a 30-yard touchdown pass to Tony Hill in the fourth quarter. He scored two touchdowns against the San Francisco 49ers. In the fifteenth game 24–17 win against the Philadelphia Eagles, he took Dorsett's place late in the first half and rushed for 62 yards (49 in the second half), helping the Cowboys clinch a playoff berth. In the dramatic comeback victory in the season finale 35–34 victory against the Washington Redskins, he rushed for 79 yards and one touchdown, had 6 catches for 58 yards, including a 26-yard touchdown reception late in the fourth-quarter rally, helping the team win the NFC East championship.

In 1980, he put on 10 pounds during the off-season and won the fullback job from Robert Newhouse, but suffered a twisted ankle in the third game and lost the starter position.

In 1981, he was the full-time starter at fullback, combining for 984 yards rushing and receiving, scoring 12 touchdowns (led the team) and tied Tony Hill for the club lead with 46 catches (one short of the franchise record for a running backs). Although his most important role might have been his leadership qualities, that gained him the respect of many people within the Cowboys organization. He set a franchise record for running backs with 11 receptions against the New England Patriots. He had a 32-yard reception late in the fourth quarter for the winning touchdown in a 28–27 comeback win against the Miami Dolphins.

In 1982, in the strike-shortened season (9 games), he registered 243 rushing yards, 2 rushing touchdowns, 163 receiving yards and 2 receiving touchdowns. In the Cowboys' 24–10 win against the Washington Redskins, he had an 8-yard touchdown reception in the first half and a 46-yard touchdown run in the final minutes.

In 1983, he led the NFL running backs in receiving and set a franchise record with 73 receptions, breaking Frank Clarke's mark of 65. He also combined for more than 1,000 yards (1,130) rushing and receiving. Against the Tampa Bay Buccaneers, he tied his club record with 11 receptions for a career-high 126 receiving yards, including a career-long 80-yard touchdown reception. Against the Los Angeles Raiders, he threw his second career touchdown pass, a 15-yarder to quarterback Danny White.

In 1984, he posted 46 catches for 454 yards, including three long touchdown receptions. He had a 25-yard touchdown catch to help beat the Philadelphia Eagles 23–17, a 26-yard reception for the winning touchdown in a 24–17 victory against the St. Louis Cardinals and a 57-yard touchdown reception in the 26–10 win against the Philadelphia Eagles.

On September 2, 1985, he was released, leaving as the Cowboys' seventh all-time leading rusher and receiver. Springs was primarily a blocking back for Hall of Famer Tony Dorsett, but he got plenty of opportunities to run and catch in head coach Tom Landry's multiple set offense. In this system he thrived as a versatile player who could run, catch, block, and occasionally even throw the option pass.

=== Tampa Bay Buccaneers ===
On September 16, 1985, he was signed as a free agent by the Tampa Bay Buccaneers, where he played his final two seasons serving as a backup to running back James Wilder Sr.

He wasn't re-signed after the 1986 season and retired, having played in the NFL for 8 years. His career totals were 2,519 yards rushing with 28 touchdowns and 249 receptions for 2,259 yards and 10 touchdowns.

== NFL career statistics ==
Legend
**Bold**	Career high

=== Regular season ===
Year	Team	Games		Rushing					Receiving				
Year	Team	GP	GS	Att	Yds	Avg	Lng	TD	Rec	Yds	Avg	Lng	TD
1979	DAL	**16**	2	67	248	3.7	15	2	25	251	10.0	27	1
1980	DAL	15	6	89	326	3.7	20	6	15	212	14.1	58	1
1981	DAL	**16**	13	**172**	**625**	3.6	16	**10**	46	359	7.8	32	2
1982	DAL	9	9	59	243	**4.1**	**46**	2	17	163	9.6	34	2
1983	DAL	**16**	**14**	149	541	3.6	19	7	**73**	**589**	8.1	**80**	1
1984	DAL	**16**	12	68	197	2.9	16	1	46	454	9.9	57	**3**
1985	TAM	12	0	16	54	3.4	11	0	3	44	**14.7**	22	0
1986	TAM	12	8	74	285	3.9	40	0	24	187	7.8	46	0
		112	64	694	2,519	3.6	46	28	249	2,259	9.1	80	10

=== Playoffs ===
Year	Team	Games		Rushing					Receiving				
Year	Team	GP	GS	Att	Yds	Avg	Lng	TD	Rec	Yds	Avg	Lng	TD
1979	DAL	1	0	5	20	4.0	15	**1**	1	2	2.0	2	0
1980	DAL	**3**	0	4	58	**14.5**	**32**	0	5	37	**7.4**	**26**	0
1981	DAL	2	**2**	**20**	**80**	4.0	10	**1**	3	13	4.3	12	0
1982	DAL	2	**2**	11	39	3.5	12	0	3	16	5.3	7	**1**
1983	DAL	1	1	2	4	2.0	3	0	**6**	**38**	6.3	12	0
		9	5	42	201	4.8	32	2	18	106	5.9	26	1

== Personal life ==
Springs was the father of NFL cornerback Shawn Springs.

== Health concerns and death ==
Springs was diagnosed with type 2 diabetes in 1990, which led to his having both his right foot and two toes from the left foot amputated. In 2004, needing a kidney, he was placed on the national transplant list. Though his son, Shawn Springs, offered to end his career and donate a kidney, Ron Springs refused. In 2006, former teammate and best friend Everson Walls agreed to donate one of his kidneys, and the transplant took place in March.

On October 16, 2007, it was reported that Springs entered into a coma after going into cardiac arrest while having an operation performed on an elbow cyst the previous weekend. He remained in this state until his death, and his son left his team to be with his father during that time. Doctors reported in 2007 that there was no chance of Springs surviving; however, his family continued encouraging him by talking to him daily. On January 5, 2008, former Cowboy teammate Bill Bates held a charity event to help raise funds for the foundation connected with Spring's illness.

On January 21, 2008, Springs's wife filed a lawsuit on behalf of her husband against the two doctors who performed the surgery, alleging malpractice. Springs died on May 12, 2011, due to a heart attack.
