= George McDuffie (American football) =

American football player (born 1963)

No. 97
- Position: Defensive end

Personal information
- Born: January 20, 1963 (age 63); Vicksburg, Mississippi, U.S.
- Listed height: 6 ft 6 in (1.98 m)
- Listed weight: 270 lb (122 kg)

Career information
- High school: Lima Senior
- College: Findlay
- NFL draft: 1987: undrafted

Career history
- Detroit Lions (1987)

Career NFL statistics
- Games played: 3
- Stats at Pro Football Reference

George Allen McDuffie (born January 20, 1963) is an American former professional football player who was a defensive end for the Detroit Lions of the National Football League (NFL). He played college football for the Findlay Oilers.
