= Tony Hill (wide receiver) =

American football player (born 1956)

No. 80
- Position: Wide receiver

Personal information
- Born: June 23, 1956 (age 70); San Diego, California, U.S.
- Listed height: 6 ft 2 in (1.88 m)
- Listed weight: 199 lb (90 kg)

Career information
- High school: Long Beach Polytechnic (Long Beach, California)
- College: Stanford
- NFL draft: 1977: 3rd round, 62nd overall pick

Career history
- Dallas Cowboys (1977–1986); San Francisco 49ers (1987)*
- * Offseason or practice squad member only

Awards and highlights
- Super Bowl champion (XII); 3× Pro Bowl (1978, 1979, 1985); Dallas Cowboys 50th Anniversary Team; 2× Second-team All-American (1975, 1976); 2× First-team All-Pacific-8 (1975, 1976)

Career NFL statistics
- Receptions: 479
- Receiving yards: 7,988
- Receiving touchdowns: 51
- Stats at Pro Football Reference

Leroy Anthony Hill Jr. (born June 23, 1956) is an American former professional football player who was a wide receiver in the National Football League (NFL), playing 10 seasons for the Dallas Cowboys. He played college football at Stanford University.

== Early life ==
Hill was a high school quarterback at Long Beach Polytechnic High School, where he followed in the footsteps of an earlier-day record passer, Gene Washington. He broke most of Washington's high school passing records, and then followed him to Stanford University, where he was converted into a wide receiver, and again broke most of Washington's receiving records.

As a senior, Hill had an ankle injury against Penn State University, that forced him to miss the University of Michigan game and be limited in the next two contests.

Hill ranks eleventh on Stanford's records with 2,225 career receiving yards. He also had 140 receptions, 18 touchdowns and graduated with a 3.3 GPA in Political Science at the age of 20. He was inducted into the Stanford Athletics Hall of Fame.

== Professional career ==
=== Dallas Cowboys ===
Hill was selected by the Dallas Cowboys in the third round (62nd overall) of the 1977 NFL draft. He started his career as a punt returner and backup wide receiver, winning a championship ring with the Cowboys when they defeated the Denver Broncos 27–10 in Super Bowl XII.

The following season, Hill became a starting wide receiver over the more-experienced Golden Richards and Butch Johnson. At the end of the season, he made the Pro Bowl, after catching 46 passes for 823 yards and six touchdowns, while helping the team to their second consecutive Super Bowl appearance. In Dallas' 35–31 Super Bowl XIII loss to the Pittsburgh Steelers, Hill caught two passes for 49 yards and a touchdown.

Known for his quick speed and big play ability, Coach Tom Landry called Hill “Our Home Run Hitter." I’ve never seen a guy who could adjust to a ball in mid-air like Tony. He is a very explosive player---the type who can turn a short play into a big play in a hurry, because he has excellent running ability and speed.”

In 1979, Hill and Drew Pearson—along with Tony Dorsett—helped the Cowboys become the first team in NFL history to have two 1,000-yard wide receivers and a 1,000-yard running back, when he recorded 60 receptions, 1,062 yards and 10 touchdowns. Pearson and Hill also became the first wide receiver tandem in Cowboys history to record 1,000-yard receiving seasons in the same year.

Hill became the number one receiver when Pearson retired after the 1983 season. His best season statistically came in 1985, when he caught 74 passes for 1100 receiving yards and seven touchdowns. Hill eventually became one of the top wide receivers in the NFL from 1978 to 1985, and was dubbed the "Thrill" and "Dial 80", because of his explosiveness and ability to make big plays. A three-time Pro Bowl selection, during his ten-year career with the Cowboys, Hill led the team in both receptions and yardage for nine straight years. He never played in a Super Bowl again, but played in 10 more postseason games. One of the better performances in his career was in a 1982 divisional playoff game against the Tampa Bay Buccaneers, when he caught seven passes for 142 yards in the Cowboys' 38–0 win.

Hill was waived by the Cowboys in 1987 at the start of training camp. His 8,072 total yards (rushing and receiving), ranks him fifth in the Cowboys All-Time list in that category, behind Hall of Famers Tony Dorsett, Emmitt Smith and Michael Irvin and tight end Jason Witten.

At the time, Hill ranked first in receiving yards, second in receiving touchdowns and second in receptions in Dallas Cowboys history.

=== San Francisco 49ers ===
On July 24, 1987, the San Francisco 49ers outbid the Los Angeles Rams for Hill's services, but he never played another regular season game, after he was released on September 7.

Hill finished his 10 NFL seasons with 479 receptions for 7,988 yards and 51 touchdowns in 142 games. He also had 26 100-yard receiving games, rushed for 84 yards, returned 27 punts for 268 yards, and gained 96 yards on four kickoff returns. For his career, he averaged 16.1 yards per touch and 16.7 yards per reception.

== NFL career statistics ==
Legend
	Won the Super Bowl
**Bold**	Career high

=== Regular season ===
Year	Team	Games		Receiving				
Year	Team	GP	GS	Rec	Yds	Avg	Lng	TD
1977	DAL	14	0	2	21	10.5	12	0
1978	DAL	**16**	13	46	823	17.9	54	6
1979	DAL	**16**	15	60	1,062	17.7	**75**	**10**
1980	DAL	**16**	13	60	1,055	17.6	58	8
1981	DAL	**16**	9	46	953	**20.7**	63	4
1982	DAL	9	8	35	526	15.0	47	1
1983	DAL	12	9	49	801	16.3	**75**	7
1984	DAL	11	11	58	864	14.9	66	5
1985	DAL	15	14	**74**	**1,113**	15.0	53	7
1986	DAL	**16**	**16**	49	770	15.7	63	3
		141	108	479	7,988	16.7	75	51

=== Playoffs ===
Year	Team	Games		Receiving				
Year	Team	GP	GS	Rec	Yds	Avg	Lng	TD
1977	DAL	**3**	0	0	0	0.0	0	0
1978	DAL	**3**	**3**	6	94	**15.7**	39	1
1979	DAL	1	1	1	0	0.0	0	0
1980	DAL	**3**	2	5	61	12.2	21	0
1981	DAL	2	2	4	61	15.3	26	**2**
1982	DAL	**3**	**3**	**16**	**246**	15.4	**49**	0
1983	DAL	1	1	9	115	12.8	23	1
1985	DAL	1	1	5	41	8.2	14	0
		17	13	46	618	13.4	49	4

== Television appearances ==
In 2000, Hill appeared as a contestant on the short-lived game show Greed. He did not win any money after he got sacked on his $500,000 question as the team's captain. The question was: Which four automotive companies and their affiliates have the highest global market share? The seven choices were General Motors, Ford, Honda, Volkswagen, Hyundai, Toyota, and BMW. Honda, BMW and Hyundai were the incorrect answers.

On June 23, 2011 (his birthday), Hill appeared on Good Morning Texas to promote the Market Street Allen USA Celebration, a Fourth of July celebration held annually the last weekend of June in his hometown, Allen, Texas. In honor of headline entertainer Lou Gramm, Hill showcased his singing voice by performing a small portion of one of Foreigner's hit songs, "Hot Blooded".

== Broadcasting ==
Hill was the color commentator for ArenaBowl V on Prime Network and was the color commentator for America One's Canadian Football League broadcasts during the Canadian Media Guild strike. He also serves as a color commentator on the Compass Media Networks for NFL and college football.

== Personal life ==
Hill is the CEO of Legends Sports Promotions, Inc., a company that raises funds for charitable organizations through celebrity basketball, softball, and football games as well as golf tournaments. It also manages athletes for motivational and promotional events. He is currently employed by the City of Allen Parks and Recreation Department as a Resource Development Manager.

Hill and his wife Millie have four children.

Hill credits his aunt [Bobbie] for helping him toward a better path and going out for sports when he was younger.
