= Kirk Phillips =

American gridiron football player (born 1960)

No. 81, 83
- Position: Wide receiver

Personal information
- Born: July 31, 1960 (age 66); Poteau, Oklahoma, U.S.
- Listed height: 6 ft 1 in (1.85 m)
- Listed weight: 202 lb (92 kg)

Career information
- High school: Spiro (OK)
- College: Tulsa
- NFL draft: 1983: undrafted

Career history
- Dallas Cowboys (1983–1984); Toronto Argonauts (1987)*; Atlanta Falcons (1987)
- * Offseason or practice squad member only

Awards and highlights
- All-MVC (1982)

Career NFL statistics
- Receptions: 1
- Receiving yards: 6
- Stats at Pro Football Reference

Kirk Douglas Phillips (born July 31, 1960) is an American former professional football player who was a wide receiver in the National Football League (NFL) for the Dallas Cowboys and Atlanta Falcons. He played college football for the Tulsa Golden Hurricane.

== Early life ==
Phillips attended Spiro High School. He played as a halfback and received All-state honors as a senior.

He accepted a football scholarship from the University of Tulsa. He was converted into a wide receiver and played on run oriented offenses. As a sophomore, he was named a starter and was second on the team with 13 receptions for 264 yards (20.3-yard avg.).

As a junior, he was a backup, tallying 5 receptions for 75 yards (15-yard avg.). As a senior, he led the team with 18 receptions for 374 yards (20.8-yard avg.) and one touchdown, while receiving All-MVC honors. He finished his college career with 40 receptions for 760 yards (19-yard avg.) and 2 touchdowns.

== Professional career ==
=== Dallas Cowboys ===
Phillips was signed as an undrafted free agent by the Dallas Cowboys after the 1983 NFL draft. He was placed on the injured reserve list in August, with a thumb injury. In 1984, he was the team's fourth wide receiver, registering one reception for 6 yards, while appearing in 8 games. He was released on August 27, 1985.

=== Toronto Argonauts (CFL) ===
On May 11, 1987, he signed with the Toronto Argonauts of the Canadian Football League. He was cut on June 5.

=== Atlanta Falcons ===
After the NFLPA strike was declared on the third week of the 1987 season, those contests were canceled (reducing the 16 game season to 15) and the NFL decided that the games would be played with replacement players. Phillips was signed in September to be a part of the Atlanta Falcons replacement team. He was a backup at wide receiver, appearing in 3 games and didn't record any offensive statistic. He was released on October 19, at the end of the strike.
