= Doug Cosbie =

American football player and coach (born 1956)

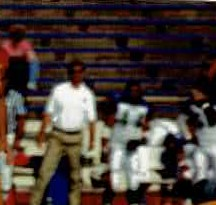

No. 84
- Position: Tight end

Personal information
- Born: March 27, 1956 (age 70); Palo Alto, California, U.S.
- Listed height: 6 ft 6 in (1.98 m)
- Listed weight: 236 lb (107 kg)

Career information
- High school: Saint Francis (Mountain View, California)
- College: Santa Clara
- NFL draft: 1979: 3rd round, 76th overall pick

Career history

Playing
- Dallas Cowboys (1979–1988); Denver Broncos (1989)*
- * Offseason or practice squad member only

Coaching
- Santa Clara (1990) Assistant coach; Stanford (1993–1994) Assistant coach; Menlo (1996) Head coach/athletic director; California (1997–1998) Offensive coordinator/wide receivers coach; Los Angeles Dragons (2000) Head coach; Bergamo Lions (2021) Head coach

Awards and highlights
- UPI All-Pro (1985); 3× Pro Bowl (1983, 1984, 1985)

Career NFL statistics
- Receptions: 300
- Receiving yards: 3,728
- Receiving touchdowns: 30
- Stats at Pro Football Reference

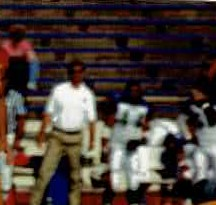
Doug Cosbie coaching the Los Angeles Dragons at San Antonio.

Douglas Durant Cosbie (born March 27, 1956) is an American former professional football player who was a tight end in the National Football League (NFL) for the Dallas Cowboys. He played college football at Santa Clara University.

Cosbie has been a football coach for several years and is currently head coach of the Bergamo Lions in the Italian Football League.

== Early life ==
Cosbie attended Saint Francis High School in Mountain View, California. He competed in football, basketball, baseball and ran in the two-mile relay in track.

As a senior in 1973, he helped the Lancers reach the finals of the Central Coast Section playoffs, before losing the title game 32–30 to Saratoga High School. In 1974, he was part of the first Santa Clara Valley All-Star Football Game, playing with the North team.

== College career ==
Cosbie initially enrolled at De Anza College. He later transferred to the College of the Holy Cross, playing 11 games as a backup, while tallying 1 reception for 6 yards. He transferred to Santa Clara University after the 1974 season, to play under head coach Pat Malley.

As a freshman in 1975, he collected 26 receptions and 5 touchdowns. As sophomore in 1976, he was named the starter at tight end, registering 34 receptions for 444 yards and one touchdown. As a junior in 1977, he posted 31 receptions for 517 yards and one touchdown.

In the regular season, he recorded 29 receptions for 427 yards and 3 touchdowns. He finished his Santa Clara career with 120 receptions for 1,721 yards, 14.3 yards per reception and 10 touchdowns. His records were eventually broken by Brent Jones. For his achievements, Cosbie was inducted into the Santa Clara University Athletic Hall of Fame.

== Professional career ==
=== Dallas Cowboys ===
Cosbie was selected by the Dallas Cowboys in the third round (76th overall) of the 1979 NFL draft. The team's draft strategy through that time was to take the highest-ranked player on their draft board, regardless of position. When the Cowboys' turn came up in the third round, the highest rated player on their board was quarterback Joe Montana. However, feeling that the quarterback position was in excellent shape with Roger Staubach, Danny White and Glenn Carano, the Cowboys needing a tight end to join Billy Joe DuPree, deviated from their philosophy and chose Cosbie instead. After being passed over by the next five teams in the draft order, the San Francisco 49ers selected Montana as the final player of the third round.

In his first 2 seasons, he was a backup behind DuPree and Jay Saldi, playing mainly on special teams and as a blocking tight end on short-yardage and goal-line situations.

In 1981, he almost won the starting tight end spot, but was still able to share it with Dupree and tied for the team lead with 5 touchdown receptions. In 1982, he was named the starter during the 9 game strike shortened season, finishing second on the team with 30 receptions (led the NFC tight ends) for 441 yards, a 14.7-yard average and 4 touchdown receptions (led the team).

In 1983, he emerged as one of the league's top tight ends, making 46 receptions (franchise record for tight ends) for 588 yards (third on the team) and 6 touchdowns. He also earned his first invitation to the Pro Bowl.

In 1984, he broke his own team record for receptions by a tight end with 60 catches, which led the team and was second among NFC tight ends. He was second on the team with 789 yards and 4 touchdowns.

In 1985, he set a team record for receptions by a tight end for the third straight year with 64 catches. He also established a franchise record for receiving yards in a season by a tight end (793) and had 6 touchdowns (second on the team). He was named to the UPI All-Pro NFC team.

In 1986, his production fell more than 50 percent to 28 receptions for 312 yards and one touchdown, mainly because of the extensive use of running back Herschel Walker as a receiver out of the back field, that produced 837 yards.

In 1987, he had 36 receptions for 421 yards and 3 touchdowns, becoming the franchise's All-time leading receiver among tight ends and his 288 catches ranked him fifth on the All-time Cowboys receiving list.

In 1988, he lost his starting job in the fifth game due to being limited by offseason surgery on his Achilles tendon, posting 4 starts, 12 receptions and 112 yards. In 1989, with the arrival of new head coach Jimmy Johnson, he was left unprotected in Plan B free agency.

Although he was a strong blocker, he became more of a receiving threat than any previous Cowboys tight end. He caught over 60 passes in a season twice during his career, and set team records for a tight end with catches and yards per season and career, which have since been broken by Jay Novacek and Jason Witten. He is part of the Cowboys franchise's legacy of great tight ends that includes: Jim Doran, Lee Folkins, Pettis Norman, Mike Ditka, Billy Joe DuPree, Jay Novacek and Jason Witten.

Cosbie caught 300 passes for 3,728 yards and 30 touchdowns and also had 22 catches for 243 yards and 3 touchdowns in 7 playoff games. He still ranks eleventh in franchise history in receptions and ninth in receiving yards. He made three straight Pro Bowls from 1983 to 1985.

=== Denver Broncos ===
On March 30, 1989, he was signed by the Denver Broncos in Plan B free agency. He decided to retire during training camp that season, after playing for 10 years in the NFL and also in three NFC Championship Games.

== NFL career statistics ==
Legend
**Bold**	Career high

=== Regular season ===
Year	Team	Games		Receiving				
Year	Team	GP	GS	Rec	Yds	Avg	Lng	TD
1979	DAL	**16**	1	5	36	7.2	12	0
1980	DAL	**16**	0	2	11	5.5	6	1
1981	DAL	**16**	0	17	225	13.2	28	5
1982	DAL	9	9	30	441	**14.7**	45	4
1983	DAL	**16**	**16**	46	588	12.8	**61**	**6**
1984	DAL	**16**	**16**	60	789	13.2	36	4
1985	DAL	**16**	**16**	**64**	**793**	12.4	42	**6**
1986	DAL	**16**	15	28	312	11.1	22	1
1987	DAL	12	12	36	421	11.7	30	3
1988	DAL	11	4	12	112	9.3	21	0
		144	89	300	3,728	12.4	61	30

=== Playoffs ===
Year	Team	Games		Receiving				
Year	Team	GP	GS	Rec	Yds	Avg	Lng	TD
1979	DAL	1	1	0	0	0.0	0	0
1980	DAL	**3**	0	0	0	0.0	0	0
1981	DAL	2	0	2	26	**13.0**	21	**1**
1982	DAL	**3**	**3**	**9**	**94**	10.4	19	**1**
1983	DAL	1	1	5	62	12.4	**22**	**1**
1985	DAL	1	1	6	61	10.2	21	0
		11	6	22	243	11.0	22	3

== Coaching career ==
- 1990, volunteer assistant coach at Santa Clara University.
- 1993–1994, assistant to head coach Bill Walsh at Stanford University
- 1995–1996, athletic director and head football coach of Division III Menlo College
- 1997–1998, offensive coordinator and wide receivers coach at University of California, Berkeley
- 2000, head football coach of the Los Angeles Dragons of the Spring Football League.
- 2009–2010, head football coach of the Sacramento High School
- 2013–2015, head football coach of the Kamehameha Schools Warriors
- 2021–present, head football coach of the Bergamo Lions in Italy.

== Personal life ==
Cosbie worked in Hollywood from 2006 to 2010 for Shangri-La Entertainment. He is also co-owner of the La Jolla Group, along with fellow Santa Clara University athletes, Kurt Rambis and Rich Brown.

== Head coaching record ==
=== College ===
Year	Team	Overall	Conference	Standing	Bowl/playoffs
**Menlo Oaks** (NCAA Division III independent) (1996)
1996	Menlo	5–4			
**Menlo Oaks** (NCAA Division III independent) (2000)
2000	Menlo	6–4			
Menlo:		11–8			
Total:		11–8			
