= Everson Walls =

American football player (born 1959)

No. 24, 28
- Positions: Cornerback, safety

Personal information
- Born: December 28, 1959 (age 66); Dallas, Texas, U.S.
- Listed height: 6 ft 1 in (1.85 m)
- Listed weight: 194 lb (88 kg)

Career information
- High school: Berkner (Richardson, Texas)
- College: Grambling State (1977–1980)
- NFL draft: 1981: undrafted

Career history
- Dallas Cowboys (1981–1989); New York Giants (1990–1992); Cleveland Browns (1992–1993)

Awards and highlights
- Super Bowl champion (XXV); 3× First-team All-Pro (1982, 1983, 1985); 4× Pro Bowl (1981–1983, 1985); 3× NFL interceptions leader (1981, 1982, 1985); PFWA All-Rookie Team (1981); NFL record: Most seasons leading league in interceptions: 3 (1981, 1982, 1985; tied with Ed Reed)

Career NFL statistics
- Interceptions: 57
- Interception yards: 504
- Touchdowns: 1
- Stats at Pro Football Reference

Everson Collins Walls (born December 28, 1959) is an American former professional football player who was a defensive back in the National Football League (NFL) for the Dallas Cowboys, the New York Giants, and the Cleveland Browns. During his 14 seasons, he was a four-time Pro Bowl selection. He was also a three-time All-Pro selection. Walls won a Super Bowl with the Giants after the 1990 season. He played college football for the Grambling State Tigers.

== Early life ==
Walls was born and raised in Richardson, TX. He was nicknamed "Cubby" and he was raised by his mother two miles from the Dallas Cowboys practice facility. He played football at Lloyd V. Berkner High School in Richardson, Texas, where he only played one year of football (senior year) and led the district in interceptions.

He was determined to play college football, and after high school, he enrolled at Grambling State University. At the time, his girlfriend was related to an assistant coach, whom Walls called regarding a walk-on spot. He was eventually invited to training camp and impressed legendary coach Eddie Robinson, who arranged to meet with his mother about granting Walls a scholarship. He received a full ride and did not disappoint, earning Division I-AA All-American honors while leading the nation with 11 interceptions his senior year.

== Professional career ==
=== Dallas Cowboys ===
Pro scouts thought he was too slow for the National Football League after he ran the 40-yard dash in a disappointing 4.72 seconds during workouts. Eventually, however, his hometown Cowboys signed him as an undrafted free agent, entering the league as a 21-year-old. Although he was being targeted by opposing quarterbacks who were throwing away from more experienced players, he made an immediate impact by leading the league in interceptions as a backup, until he was named the starter in the fifth game of the season and finished with a league leading 11 interceptions. Coached by the legendary Tom Landry, he received a Pro Bowl invitation as a rookie for his contributions.

In the 1982 strike-shortened season, he again led the league in interceptions after recording seven in just nine games. Surrounded by a strong defensive unit, which included players like Randy White and Ed "Too Tall" Jones, Walls continued his outstanding play and again led the league in interceptions in 1985 with 9. In the history of the NFL, only he and safety Ed Reed have led the league in interceptions three times.

Walls received Pro Bowl honors four times (1981, 1982, 1983 and 1985). During this period of time however, the Cowboys were unable to win a Super Bowl, as they lost the NFC title game in 1981 and 1982 and fell short again in 1983 and 1985. Despite this, Walls remained one of the most feared cover cornerbacks in the league; eventually, quarterbacks were forced to stop throwing the ball to his side. He led the Cowboys in interceptions five seasons, tied with Terence Newman for leading the most seasons in franchise history.

He also was known for his contract disputes with the Cowboys, which were eventually settled in 1987, when Walls was given a three-year deal worth $5.05 million. This made him the second-highest paid cornerback in the league.

The team waived him at the end of the 1989 season, because of a lack of production and an incident that happened after a loss to the Phoenix Cardinals, when head coach Jimmy Johnson saw him talking with some friends among the Cardinals players. His 44 interceptions ranks him second on the Cowboys career list.

=== New York Giants ===
In 1990, Walls joined the New York Giants as a free agent, signing a two-year deal worth over one million dollars. Walls started at cornerback, led the Giants with six interceptions during the regular season, and, on a standout defensive squad with Lawrence Taylor, Leonard Marshall, and Carl Banks, he eventually called most of the defensive plays. It was here that Walls would record his first and only career defensive touchdown, a game-clinching interception return against the Washington Redskins to get the Giants to 7–0 on the season.

Coached by Bill Parcells, with defensive coordinator Bill Belichick, the Giants posted a 13–3 record and reached the NFC Championship game, where they traveled to San Francisco to face the two-time defending Super Bowl champion 49ers. With a late field goal, the Giants were able to pull off the upset, 15–13, to advance to Super Bowl XXV, where they met the AFC champion Buffalo Bills. During the game, Walls made a critical play when he tackled Thurman Thomas in the open field with less than two minutes to play - a tackle that likely stopped a sure touchdown for the Bills. The Giants would win the Super Bowl, 20–19, on Scott Norwood's missed field goal attempt as time ran out. Walls was on the Sports Illustrated cover photo as he was captured with his arms raised in victory after the Giants won the game.

In 1992, he was a starter for 2 games, before being passed on the depth chart by second-year player Lamar McGriggs. He was released on October 21, after playing as a backup in 4 more games, while registering 12 tackles and one interception.

=== Cleveland Browns ===
On October 23, 1992, Walls signed with the Cleveland Browns as a free agent, reuniting with head coach and former Giants defensive coordinator Belichick. After learning that he could not step backwards, defensive coordinator Nick Saban taught Walls to move his hips and shuffle. He played in 10 games with 5 starts and had 2 interceptions. In 1993, he started 7 games before being released on October 27.

In his final three professional seasons after he was switched to safety from the cornerback position, he recorded a total of seven interceptions.

== Professional legacy ==
Walls is one of the most prolific and decorated defensive backs to ever play in the game. He is one of only two players to lead the NFL in interceptions three times (Ed Reed is the other). He also led his Cowboys in interceptions a franchise-record five times, he ranks second in the team's career interceptions list and is 10th all-time on the career interceptions list, with 57. In addition, he shares the career Pro Bowl interceptions record with four, and shares the single-game Pro Bowl record for interceptions with two. With experience under Eddie Robinson, Tom Landry, Bill Parcells, Jimmy Johnson, Bill Belichick and Nick Saban. Walls has played for some of the winningest coaches in history. He was named to the Cowboys 25th Year Anniversary Team.

Despite his accolades, Walls remains an outsider to the Pro Football Hall of Fame. However, in his final year of eligibility he made it as a modern-era finalist for the first and only time, but did not make it past the cutdown from 15 to 10. If Walls makes it in the future, he will be selected through the hall of fame's Senior Committee. On December 6, 2006, it was announced that Walls would be inducted into the Southwestern Athletic Conference Hall of Fame.

He was also inducted into the Texas Black Sports Hall of Fame, the Louisiana Sports Hall of Fame and the Grambling Legends Sports Hall of Fame.

In 2019, the Professional Football Researchers Association named Walls to the PFRA Hall of Very Good Class of 2019.

Walls was named the 2010 FCS Championship game ambassador.

Walls was guarding Dwight Clark on a key play near the end of the 1981 NFC Championship, a reception that is remembered as "The Catch". A photograph of the catch, taken by Walter Iooss, with Clark at the height of his leap and Walls reaching out to try to block the ball, was featured on the cover of Sports Illustrated following the game, in which the 49ers defeated the Cowboys 28–27. Nearly ten years later, Walls would again be featured on the cover of Sports Illustrated, but this time as a winner, celebrating the Giants Super Bowl XXV win over the Buffalo Bills (Feb 4, 1991).

After signing with the Cowboys in August 2020, former Minnesota Vikings pass rusher Everson Griffen, who grew up as a Cowboys fan, revealed that he was named after Walls.

== Kidney donation ==
On Tuesday, December 12, 2006, it was announced that Walls would donate a kidney to former Cowboys teammate Ron Springs, who had diabetes. The surgery was successfully completed in March 2007.

In 2009, he wrote the book A Gift For Ron, detailing his experiences on and off the field including the decision to make the organ donation to Springs.

== Awards ==
- Division I-AA first-team All-American (1980–81 season)
- Grambling State University Athletic Hall of Fame (1998)
- Louisiana Sports Hall of Fame (1998)
- NFL Defensive Back of the Year (1982)
- NFL Pro Bowl (1981–83, 1985)
- Texas Black Sports Hall of Fame (2003)
- SWAC Hall of Fame (2006)
- Tom Landry Award (2007)
