= Don Smerek =

American football player (1957–2024)

No. 60
- Position: Defensive lineman

Personal information
- Born: December 20, 1957; Waterford, Michigan, U.S.
- Died: March 16, 2024 (aged 66)
- Listed height: 6 ft 7 in (2.01 m)
- Listed weight: 255 lb (116 kg)

Career information
- High school: Basic (Henderson, Nevada)
- College: Nevada
- NFL draft: 1980: undrafted

Career history
- Dallas Cowboys (1980–1987)

Awards and highlights
- All-Big Sky (1979)

Career NFL statistics
- Games played: 69
- Games started: 4
- Sacks: 14.5
- Stats at Pro Football Reference

Donald Frederick Smerek (December 20, 1957 – March 16, 2024) was an American professional football player who was a defensive lineman for the Dallas Cowboys of the National Football League (NFL). He played college football at the University of Nevada.

== Early life ==
Smerek attended Basic High School, where he was an All-state player in football. He also practiced basketball.

He accepted a football scholarship from the University of Nevada, which was an NCAA Division II school at the time.

In 1978, the program moved up to Division I-AA. He contributed to the team achieving a No. 1 national ranking during that season.

As a senior in 1979, he helped his team finish undefeated (11-0) in the regular season and was named All-Big Sky at defensive end.

== Professional career ==
Smerek was signed as an undrafted free agent by the Dallas Cowboys after the 1980 NFL draft on May 1. In training camp, he fractured his ribs and was placed on the injured reserve list.

In 1981, he was moved to defensive tackle, but suffered a knee injury in the second game of the regular season and was placed on the injured reserve list. While being inactive, he had a traffic related argument in the parking lot of a Dallas restaurant and was shot in the chest. The shooter was never indicted with a crime, after the jurors believed there was sufficient evidence he acted in self-defense. His physical fitness helped him survive the injury and return to play football.

In 1982, he was a starter for the Cowboys in the playoffs, replacing the injured John Dutton at left defensive tackle. He made his first career start in the playoffs against the Green Bay Packers, posting 10 tackles and one sack.

In 1983, he began to substitute Dutton on passing downs, finishing with six sacks (fourth on the team) and 17 tackles.

In 1984, although he played defensive tackle, head coach Tom Landry gave him the first shot at retired Harvey Martin's right defensive end position. But due to the holdout of Randy White, the team was forced to play him at right defensive tackle during the 4 preseason games, and he never received the opportunity to compete with Jim Jeffcoat for the starting position, nor was he able to catch up. He remained in his role of a pass rush specialist at left defensive tackle, registering 10 tackles and one sack.

In 1985, he was competing for the left defensive tackle position, but suffered a right shoulder injury that forced him to miss training camp. He tried to play in the season opener against the Washington Redskins, but his shoulder wasn't strong enough and was placed on the injured reserve list on September 10. He returned after six games, making two sacks (came in his first game against the Atlanta Falcons) and would also match his career-high 17 tackles.

In 1986, he missed the first five games of the season because of a sprained knee, registering 17 tackles and 4.5 sacks.

In 1987, he was placed on the injured reserve list with a sprained knee, before crossing the picket lines and being activated in September, after the NFL players went on a strike. He would start the three replacement games at defensive end. He saw most of his playing time in passing situations during the remainder of the season. He finished with 14 tackles (9 in the fifth game against the Washington Redskins). Smerek retired after being waived on August 23, 1988.

== Personal life ==
Smerek lived in Texas (Weston and Van Alstyne), after his football career ended. He died from cancer on March 16, 2024, at the age of 66.
