= List of Dallas Cowboys seasons =

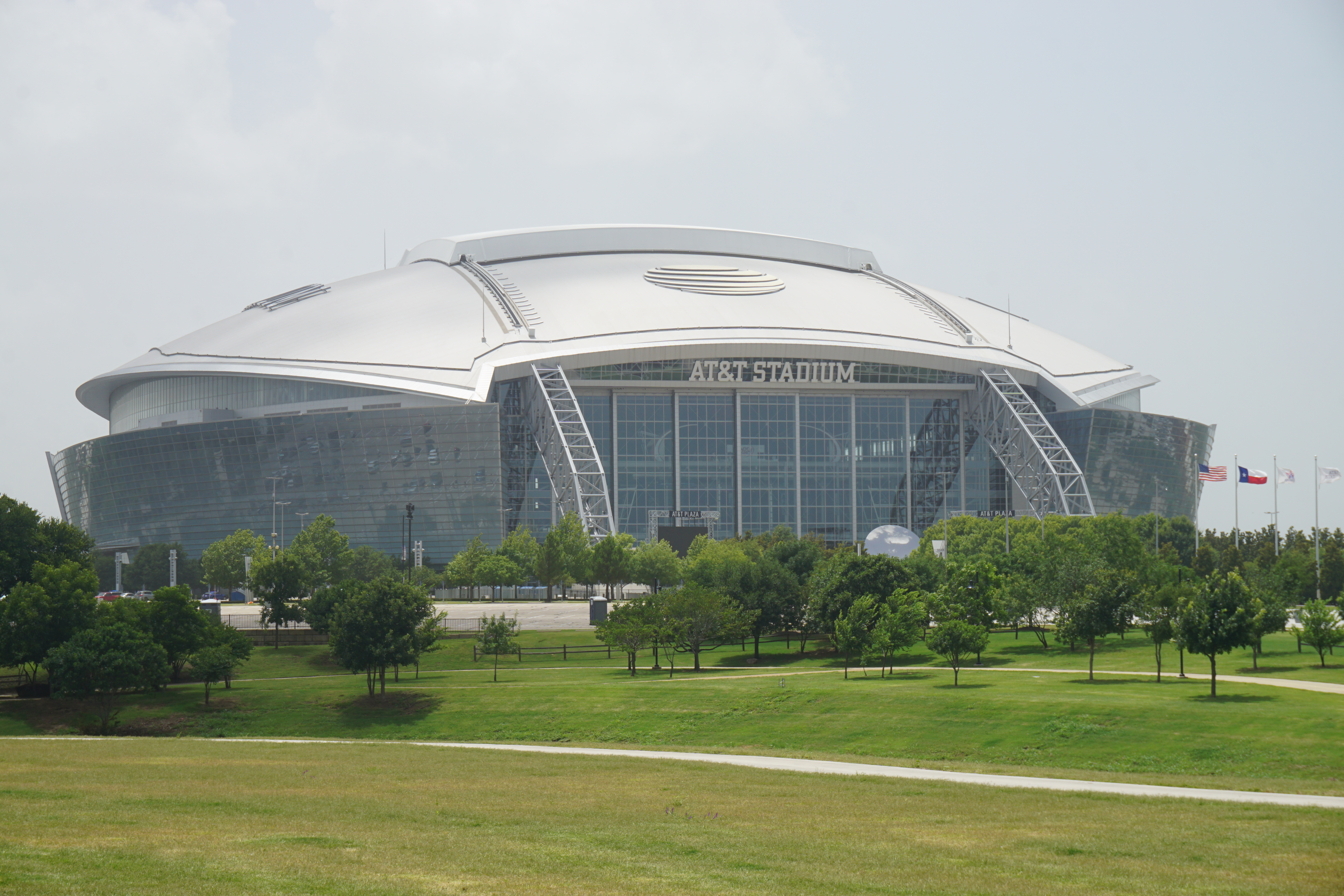
The Dallas Cowboys have played their home games at AT&T Stadium since 2009.

The Dallas Cowboys are a professional American football team based in the Dallas–Fort Worth metroplex. The Cowboys compete in the National Football League (NFL) as a member of the National Football Conference (NFC) East Division. The Cowboys joined the NFL as an expansion team in 1960 and have played their home games at AT&T Stadium in Arlington, Texas, since 2009. Originally a member of the NFL Western Conference, the team was moved to the NFL Eastern Conference in 1961 after just one season; they remained in this conference until 1970. In 1967 the NFL subdivided the Eastern and Western conferences into divisions, assigning the Cowboys to the NFL Capitol Division. In 1970, as part of the AFL–NFL merger, the Cowboys were reassigned to the National Football Conference (NFC). In addition to being reassigned conferences, the Cowboys' division, the NFL Capitol Division, was renamed to the NFC East Division.

The franchise has made it to the Super Bowl eight times, tying it with the Pittsburgh Steelers and Denver Broncos for second-most Super Bowl appearances in history behind the New England Patriots' record 11 appearances. Of their eight appearances, the Cowboys have won five Super Bowls (Super Bowls VI, XII, XXVII, XXVIII and XXX) which is tied for 3rd most in total championships amongst all 32 NFL franchises. The Cowboys have won eight NFC championships, tied for most in the conference's history. The Cowboys are the only NFL team to record 20 consecutive winning seasons (from 1966 to 1985) during which they missed the playoffs only twice (1974 and 1984). The Cowboys have won their division 25 times, the most among the teams in their division.

As of the end of the 2024 season, the Cowboys have accumulated a record of 569 wins, 423 losses, and 6 ties in the regular season, which is the second-best all-time regular season record among active franchises in terms of win–loss percentage. They have also made the playoffs 36 times, second only to the Green Bay Packers, and have the ninth-best playoff record in terms of win–loss percentage with 36 wins and 31 losses. The team has had 40 winning seasons, 19 losing seasons, and 6 seasons with as many wins as losses.

== Seasons ==
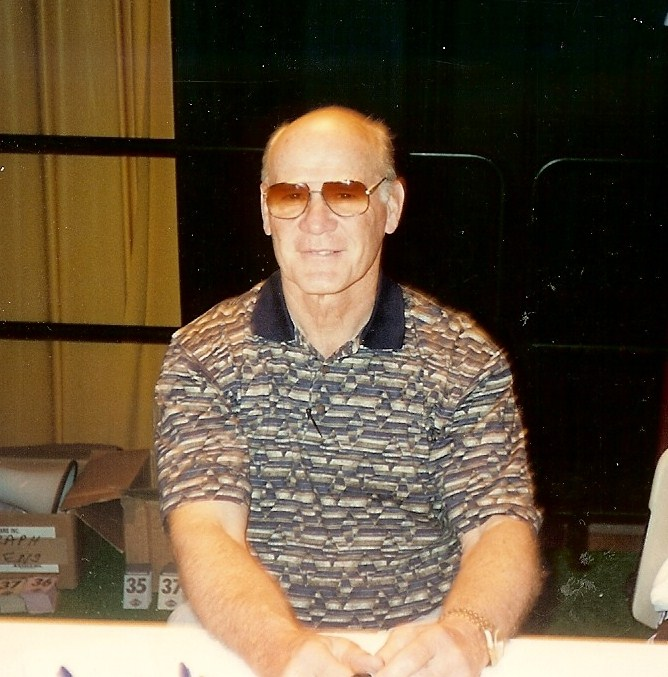
Tom Landry was the head coach of the Cowboys for 29 seasons. During this time he had 20 consecutive winning seasons, won two Super Bowls, and was named the AP NFL Coach of the Year. Landry was inducted into the Pro Football Hall of Fame in 1990 and was unanimously selected as a coach for the NFL 100th Anniversary All-Time Team.

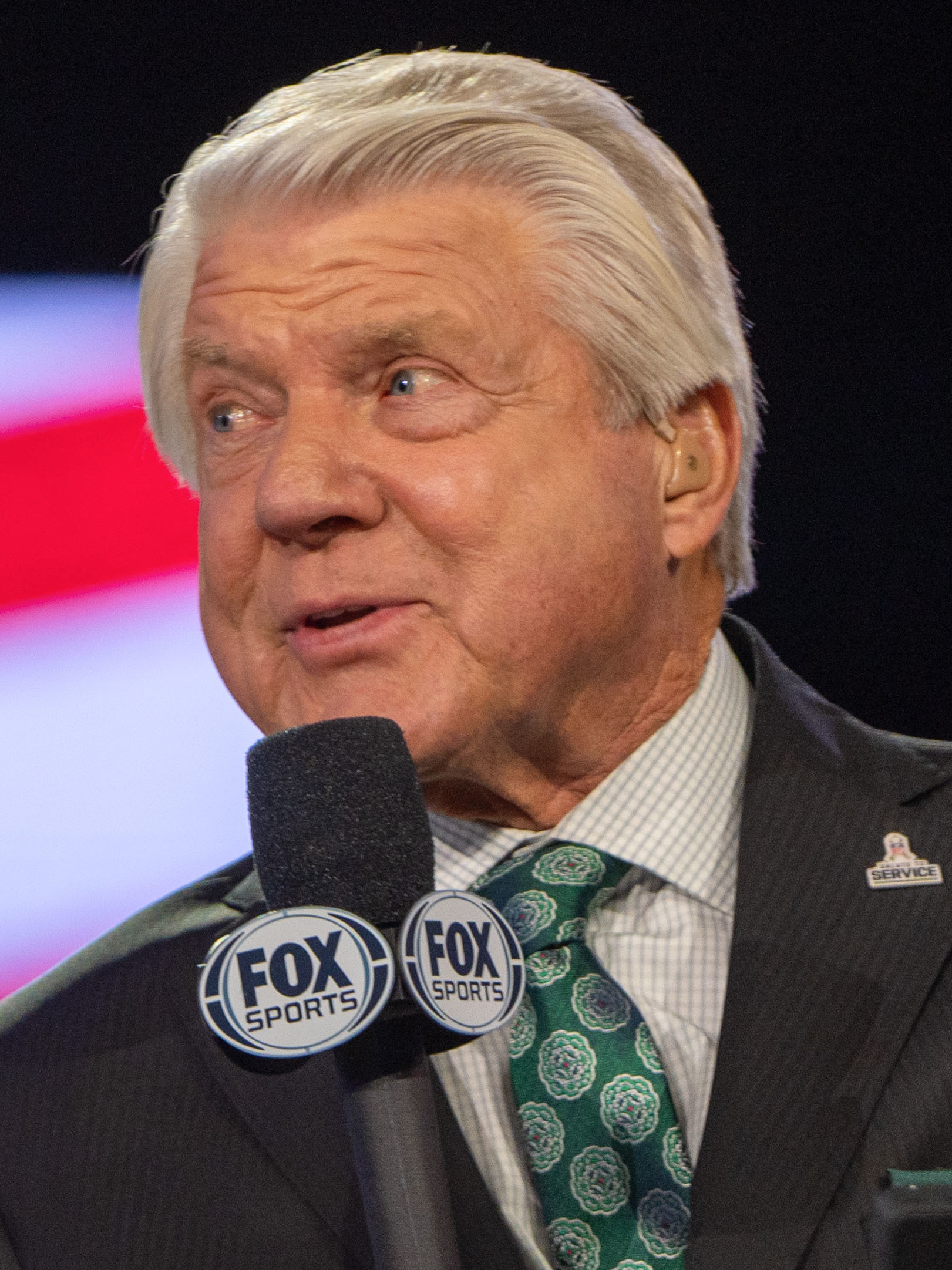
Jimmy Johnson was the head coach of the Cowboys for five seasons. He led the team to three playoff appearances, two division titles, and two Super Bowls. In 2020, he was inducted into the Pro Football Hall of Fame.

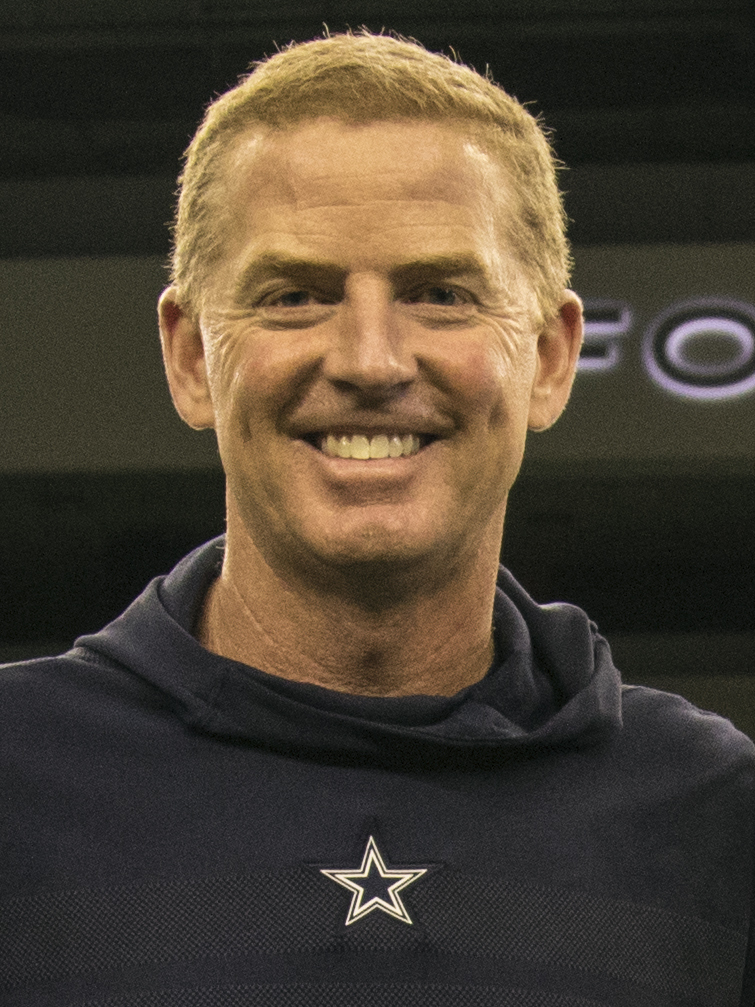
Jason Garrett, a former backup quarterback for the team from 1992 to 1999, was the team's head coach from 2011 to 2019 and the interim head coach for part of the 2010 season.

Legend
^{(#)}	The order of league championship won by the franchise
Finish	Final position in league, division, or conference
Pct	The team's winning percentage for the season
^{‡}	Super Bowl champions (1970–present)
^{*}	Conference champions
^{^}	Division champions
^{§}	Wild Card berth

Dallas Cowboys record by season
Season	Team	League	Conference	Division	Regular season					Postseason results	Awards	Head coach	Refs
Season	Team	League	Conference	Division	Finish	W	L	T	Pct	Postseason results	Awards	Head coach	Refs
1960	1960	NFL	Western		7th	0	11	1	.042			Tom Landry	
1961	1961	NFL	Eastern (Note: The Cowboys played in the NFL's Western Conference for the 1960 season, but were a "swing team" and played each of the other 12 teams in the league that year. When the Minnesota Vikings joined the league for the 1961 season, the owners of the Eastern Conference teams were allowed to vote on which expansion franchise they wanted to be permanently assigned to their conference. The result was the Cowboys joining the NFL's Eastern Conference.)		6th	4	9	1	.321			Tom Landry	(Note: In 1961, the NFL expanded its regular season schedule, which had been 12 games since 1947, to 14 games.)
1962	1962	NFL	Eastern		5th	5	8	1	.393			Tom Landry	
1963	1963	NFL	Eastern		5th	4	10	0	.286			Tom Landry	
1964	1964	NFL	Eastern		5th	5	8	1	.393			Tom Landry	
1965	1965	NFL	Eastern		2nd	7	7	0	.500			Tom Landry	
1966	1966	NFL	Eastern^{*}		1st^{*}	10	3	1	.750	Lost NFL Championship (Packers) 34–27	Tom Landry (COY)	Tom Landry	
1967	1967	NFL	Eastern^{*}	Capitol^{^} (Note: In 1967, the NFL divided conferences into divisions, resulting in two divisions in each of the two conferences. Up to 1967, the league was either divided into two divisions, two conferences, or neither.)	1st^{^}	9	5	0	.643	Won Conference playoffs (Browns) 52–14; Lost NFL Championship (at Packers) 21–17		Tom Landry	
1968	1968	NFL	Eastern	Capitol^{^}	1st^{^}	12	2	0	.857	Lost Conference playoffs (at Browns) 31–20		Tom Landry	
1969	1969	NFL	Eastern	Capitol^{^}	1st^{^}	11	2	1	.821	Lost Conference playoffs (Browns) 38–14	Calvin Hill (OROY)	Tom Landry	
1970	1970	NFL	NFC^{*} (Note: In 1970, the NFL and American Football League (AFL) officially merged in the AFL–NFL merger to form one league with two conferences. All ten former AFL teams as well as Pittsburgh, Cleveland, and Baltimore from the pre-merger NFL joined the AFC; the other thirteen remaining NFL teams joined the NFC. Each of those two were divided into three divisions: East, Central, and West.)	East^{^}	1st^{^}	10	4	0	.714	Won Divisional playoffs (Lions) 5–0; Won NFC Championship (at 49ers) 17–10; Lost Super Bowl V (vs. Colts) 16–13	Chuck Howley (SB MVP)	Tom Landry	
1971	1971	NFL^{‡}	NFC^{*}	East^{^}	1st^{^}	11	3	0	.786	Won Divisional playoffs (at Vikings) 20–12; Won NFC Championship (49ers) 14–3; Won Super Bowl VI (1) (vs. Dolphins) 24–3	Roger Staubach (SB MVP)	Tom Landry	
1972	1972	NFL	NFC	East	2nd^{§}	10	4	0	.714	Won Divisional playoffs (at 49ers) 30–28; Lost NFC Championship (at Redskins) 3–26		Tom Landry	
1973	1973	NFL	NFC	East^{^}	1st^{^}	10	4	0	.714	Won Divisional playoffs (Rams) 27–16; Lost NFC Championship (Vikings) 27–10		Tom Landry	
1974	1974	NFL	NFC	East	3rd	8	6	0	.571			Tom Landry	
1975	1975	NFL	NFC*	East	2nd^{§}	10	4	0	.714	Won Divisional playoffs (at Vikings) 17–14; Won NFC Championship (at Rams) 37–7; Lost Super Bowl X (vs. Steelers) 21–17		Tom Landry	
1976	1976	NFL	NFC	East^{^}	1st^{^}	11	3	0	.786	Lost Divisional playoffs (Rams) 14–12		Tom Landry	
1977	1977	NFL^{‡}	NFC^{*}	East^{^}	1st^{^}	12	2	0	.857	Won Divisional playoffs (Bears) 37–7; Won NFC Championship (Vikings) 23–6; Won Super Bowl XII (2) (vs. Broncos) 27–10	Tony Dorsett (OROY) Harvey Martin (DPOY, SB MVP) Randy White (SB MVP)	Tom Landry	
1978	1978	NFL	NFC^{*}	East^{^}	1st^{^}	12	4	0	.750	Won Divisional playoffs (Falcons) 27–20; Won NFC Championship (at Rams) 28–0; Lost Super Bowl XIII (vs. Steelers) 35–31		Tom Landry	(Note: In 1978, the NFL expanded its regular season schedule, which had been 14 games since 1961, to 16 games.)
1979	1979	NFL	NFC	East^{^}	1st^{^}	11	5	0	.688	Lost Divisional playoffs (Rams) 21–19		Tom Landry	
1980	1980	NFL	NFC	East	2nd^{§}	12	4	0	.750	Won Wild Card playoffs (Rams) 34–13; Won Divisional playoffs (at Falcons) 30–27; Lost NFC Championship (at Eagles) 20–7		Tom Landry	
1981	1981	NFL	NFC	East^{^}	1st^{^}	12	4	0	.750	Won Divisional playoffs (Buccaneers) 38–0; Lost NFC Championship (at 49ers) 28–27		Tom Landry	
1982	1982	NFL	NFC	None (Note: The 1982 season was shortened to nine games after a players' strike. The top eight teams in each conference advanced to the playoffs.)	2nd^{§}	6	3	0	.667	Won First Round playoffs (Buccaneers) 30–17; Won Second Round playoffs (Packers) 37–26; Lost NFC Championship (at Redskins) 31–17		Tom Landry	
1983	1983	NFL	NFC	East	2nd^{§}	12	4	0	.750	Lost Wild Card playoffs (Rams) 24–17		Tom Landry	
1984	1984	NFL	NFC	East	4th	9	7	0	.563			Tom Landry	
1985	1985	NFL	NFC	East^{^}	1st^{^}	10	6	0	.625	Lost Divisional playoffs (at Rams) 20–0		Tom Landry	
1986	1986	NFL	NFC	East	3rd	7	9	0	.438			Tom Landry	
1987	1987	NFL	NFC	East	2nd	7	8	0	.467			Tom Landry	(Note: The 1987 NFL strike caused the schedule to be reduced to 15 games.)
1988	1988	NFL	NFC	East	5th	3	13	0	.188			Tom Landry	
1989	1989	NFL	NFC	East	5th	1	15	0	.063			Jimmy Johnson	
1990	1990	NFL	NFC	East	4th	7	9	0	.438		Jimmy Johnson (COY) Emmitt Smith (OROY)	Jimmy Johnson	
1991	1991	NFL	NFC	East	2nd^{§}	11	5	0	.688	Won Wild Card playoffs (at Bears) 17–13; Lost Divisional playoffs (at Lions) 38–6		Jimmy Johnson	
1992	1992	NFL^{‡}	NFC^{*}	East^{^}	1st^{^}	13	3	0	.813	Won Divisional playoffs (Eagles) 34–10; Won NFC Championship (at 49ers) 30–20; Won Super Bowl XXVII (3) (vs. Bills) 52–17	Troy Aikman (SB MVP)	Jimmy Johnson	
1993	1993	NFL^{‡}	NFC^{*}	East^{^}	1st^{^}	12	4	0	.750	Won Divisional playoffs (Packers) 27–17; Won NFC Championship (49ers) 38–21; Won Super Bowl XXVIII (4) (vs. Bills) 30–13	Emmitt Smith (SB MVP)	Jimmy Johnson	
1994	1994	NFL	NFC	East^{^}	1st^{^}	12	4	0	.750	Won Divisional playoffs (Packers) 35–9; Lost NFC Championship (at 49ers) 38–28		Barry Switzer	
1995	1995	NFL^{‡}	NFC^{*}	East^{^}	1st^{^}	12	4	0	.750	Won Divisional playoffs (Eagles) 30–11; Won NFC Championship (Packers) 38–27; Won Super Bowl XXX (5) (vs. Steelers) 27–17	Larry Brown (SB MVP)	Barry Switzer	
1996	1996	NFL	NFC	East^{^}	1st^{^}	10	6	0	.625	Won Wild Card playoffs (Vikings) 40–15; Lost Divisional playoffs (at Panthers) 26–17		Barry Switzer	
1997	1997	NFL	NFC	East	4th	6	10	0	.375			Barry Switzer	
1998	1998	NFL	NFC	East^{^}	1st^{^}	10	6	0	.625	Lost Wild Card playoffs (Cardinals) 20–7		Chan Gailey	
1999	1999	NFL	NFC	East	2nd^{§}	8	8	0	.500	Lost Wild Card playoffs (at Vikings) 27–10		Chan Gailey	
2000	2000	NFL	NFC	East	4th	5	11	0	.313			Dave Campo	
2001	2001	NFL	NFC	East	5th	5	11	0	.313			Dave Campo	
2002	2002	NFL	NFC	East (Note: In 2002, the NFL realigned to create four divisions in both conferences with four teams in each division.)	4th	5	11	0	.313			Dave Campo	
2003	2003	NFL	NFC	East	2nd^{§}	10	6	0	.625	Lost Wild Card playoffs (at Panthers) 29–10		Bill Parcells	
2004	2004	NFL	NFC	East	3rd	6	10	0	.375			Bill Parcells	
2005	2005	NFL	NFC	East	3rd	9	7	0	.563			Bill Parcells	
2006	2006	NFL	NFC	East	2nd^{§}	9	7	0	.563	Lost Wild Card playoffs (at Seahawks) 21–20		Bill Parcells	
2007	2007	NFL	NFC	East^{^}	1st^{^}	13	3	0	.813	Lost Divisional playoffs (Giants) 21–17	Greg Ellis (CBPOY)	Wade Phillips	
2008	2008	NFL	NFC	East	3rd	9	7	0	.563			Wade Phillips	
2009	2009	NFL	NFC	East^{^}	1st^{^}	11	5	0	.688	Won Wild Card playoffs (Eagles) 34–14; Lost Divisional playoffs (at Vikings) 34–3		Wade Phillips	
2010	2010	NFL	NFC	East	3rd	6	10	0	.375			Wade Phillips (1–7) Jason Garrett (5–3)	
2011	2011	NFL	NFC	East	3rd	8	8	0	.500			Jason Garrett	
2012	2012	NFL	NFC	East	3rd	8	8	0	.500		Jason Witten (WPMOY)	Jason Garrett	
2013	2013	NFL	NFC	East	2nd	8	8	0	.500			Jason Garrett	
2014	2014	NFL	NFC	East^{^}	1st^{^}	12	4	0	.750	Won Wild Card playoffs (Lions) 24–20; Lost Divisional playoffs (at Packers) 26–21	DeMarco Murray (OPOY)	Jason Garrett	
2015	2015	NFL	NFC	East	4th	4	12	0	.250			Jason Garrett	
2016	2016	NFL	NFC	East^{^}	1st^{^}	13	3	0	.813	Lost Divisional playoffs (Packers) 34–31	Jason Garrett (COY) Dak Prescott (OROY)	Jason Garrett	
2017	2017	NFL	NFC	East	2nd	9	7	0	.563			Jason Garrett	
2018	2018	NFL	NFC	East^{^}	1st^{^}	10	6	0	.625	Won Wild Card playoffs (Seahawks) 24–22; Lost Divisional playoffs (at Rams) 30–22		Jason Garrett	
2019	2019	NFL	NFC	East	2nd	8	8	0	.500			Jason Garrett	
2020	2020	NFL	NFC	East	3rd	6	10	0	.375			Mike McCarthy	
2021	2021	NFL	NFC	East^{^}	1st^{^}	12	5	0	.706	Lost Wild Card playoffs (49ers) 23–17	Micah Parsons (DROY)	Mike McCarthy	(Note: In 2021, the NFL expanded its regular season schedule, which had been 16 games since 1978, to 17 games.)
2022	2022	NFL	NFC	East	2nd^{§}	12	5	0	.706	Won Wild Card playoffs (at Buccaneers) 31–14; Lost Divisional playoffs (at 49ers) 19–12	Dak Prescott (WPMOY)	Mike McCarthy	
2023	2023	NFL	NFC	East^{^}	1st^{^}	12	5	0	.706	Lost Wild Card playoffs (Packers) 48–32		Mike McCarthy	
2024	2024	NFL	NFC	East	3rd	7	10	0	.412			Mike McCarthy	
2025	2025	NFL	NFC	East	2nd	7	9	1	.441			Brian Schottenheimer	
Totals						576	432	7	.571	All-time regular season record (1960–2025)			
Totals						36	31	—	.537	All-time postseason record (1960–2025)			
Totals						612	463	7	.569	All-time regular season & postseason record (1960–2025)			

== See also ==
- History of the Dallas Cowboys
- List of Dallas Cowboys first-round draft picks
- List of Dallas Cowboys head coaches
