= 1976 Pro Bowl =

National Football League all-star game

1976 NFL Pro Bowl
AFC	NFC
20	23
Head coach: John Madden (Oakland Raiders)	Head coach: Chuck Knox (Los Angeles Rams)
	1	2	3	4	Total
AFC	0	13	0	7	20
NFC	0	0	9	14	23
- Date: January 26, 1976
- Stadium: Louisiana Superdome New Orleans, Louisiana
- MVP: Billy Johnson (Houston Oilers)
- Referee: Fred Silva
- Attendance: 32,108

TV in the United States
- Network: ABC
- Announcers: Frank Gifford, Howard Cosell, and Alex Karras

The 1976 Pro Bowl was the NFL's 26th annual all-star game which featured the outstanding performers from the 1975 season. The game was played on Monday night, January 26, 1976, at the new Louisiana Superdome in New Orleans, Louisiana, with 32,108 in attendance. The final score was NFC 23, AFC 20. It was also the first Pro Bowl game played indoors.

The game featured the best players in the National Football League as selected by the league's coaches. John Madden of the Oakland Raiders led the AFC team against an NFC team led by Los Angeles Rams head coach Chuck Knox.

The AFC's Billy "White Shoes" Johnson was named the game's MVP on the strength of a 90-yard punt return touchdown and a second punt return of 55 yards that set up a field goal. The referee was Fred Silva.

Players on the winning NFC team received $2,000 apiece while the AFC participants each took home $1,500.

== Rosters ==
The 40-man Pro Bowl squads consisted of the following players:

=== Offense ===
Position	AFC	NFC
Quarterback	Terry Bradshaw – Pittsburgh^{[a]} **Ken Anderson** – Cincinnati; **Dan Pastorini** – Houston^{[b]}	Fran Tarkenton – Minnesota^{[a]} **Jim Hart** – St. Louis; Roger Staubach – Dallas^{[b]}^{[a]} **Mike Boryla** – Philadelphia^{[b]}
Running back	**O. J. Simpson** – Buffalo; **Franco Harris** – Pittsburgh; **Lydell Mitchell** – Baltimore; **John Riggins** – NY Jets	**Chuck Foreman** – Minnesota; **Terry Metcalf** – St. Louis; **Lawrence McCutcheon** – Los Angeles; **Jim Otis** – St. Louis
Wide receiver	**Lynn Swann** – Pittsburgh; **Isaac Curtis** – Cincinnati; **Cliff Branch** – Oakland; **Ken Burrough** – Houston	**Mel Gray** – St. Louis; **John Gilliam** –Minnesota; **Harold Jackson** – Los Angeles; **Charley Taylor** – Washington
Tight end	**Riley Odoms** – Denver; **Rich Caster** – NY Jets	**Charle Young** – Philadelphia; **Charlie Sanders** – Detroit
Tackle	**Art Shell** – Oakland; **George Kunz** – Baltimore; **Russ Washington** – San Diego	**Ron Yary** – Minnesota; **Dan Dierdorf** – St. Louis; **Rayfield Wright** – Dallas
Guard	**Bob Kuechenberg** – Miami; **Gene Upshaw** – Oakland; **Joe DeLamielleure** – Buffalo	**Ed White** – Minnesota; **Conrad Dobler** – St. Louis; **Tom Mack** – Los Angeles
Center	**Jim Langer** – Miami; **Jack Rudnay** – Kansas City	**Tom Banks** – St. Louis; **Jeff Van Note** – Atlanta

=== Defense ===
Position	AFC	NFC
Defensive end	**John Dutton** – Baltimore; **L. C. Greenwood** – Pittsburgh; **Elvin Bethea** – Houston	**Jack Youngblood** – Los Angeles; **Cedrick Hardman** – San Francisco; **Fred Dryer** – Los Angeles
Defensive tackle	**Jerry Sherk** – Cleveland; **Joe Greene** – Pittsburgh; **Curley Culp** – Houston	**Alan Page** – Minnesota; **Merlin Olsen** – Los Angeles; **Wally Chambers** – Chicago
Middle linebacker	Willie Lanier – Kansas City^{[a]} **Jack Lambert** – Pittsburgh; **Randy Gradishar** – Denver^{[b]}	**Jeff Siemon** – Minnesota; **Jack Reynolds** – Los Angeles
Outside linebacker	**Andy Russell** – Pittsburgh; **Jack Ham** – Pittsburgh; **Phil Villapiano** – Oakland	**Chris Hanburger** – Washington; **Isiah Robertson** – Los Angeles; **Fred Carr** – Green Bay
Cornerback	**Mel Blount** – Pittsburgh; **Lemar Parrish** – Cincinnati; **Emmitt Thomas** – Kansas City	**Roger Wehrli** – St. Louis; **Lem Barney** – Detroit; **Bobby Bryant** – Minnesota
Safety	**Mike Wagner** – Pittsburgh; **Jake Scott** – Miami; Jack Tatum –Oakland^{[a]} **Glen Edwards** – Pittsburgh^{[b]}	**Cliff Harris** – Dallas; **Ken Houston** – Washington; **Paul Krause** – Minnesota

=== Special teams ===
Position	AFC	NFC
Kicker	**Jan Stenerud** – Kansas City	**Jim Bakken** – St. Louis
Punter	**Ray Guy** – Oakland	**John James** – Atlanta
Return specialist	**Billy Johnson** – Houston	**Steve Odom** – Green Bay

Roster Notes:

bold denotes player who participated in game
^{a} Injured player; selected but did not play
^{b} Replacement selection due to injury or vacancy

== Number of selections by team ==
Note: these numbers include players selected to the team but unable to play as well as replacements for these injured players, so there are more than 40 players in each conference.

AFC team	Selections
Pittsburgh Steelers	11
Oakland Raiders	6
Houston Oilers	5
Kansas City Chiefs	4
Baltimore Colts	3
Cincinnati Bengals	3
Miami Dolphins	3
Buffalo Bills	2
Denver Broncos	2
New York Jets	2
Cleveland Browns	1
San Diego Chargers	1
New England Patriots	—

NFC team	Selections
Minnesota Vikings	9
St. Louis Cardinals	9
Los Angeles Rams	8
Dallas Cowboys	3
Washington Redskins	3
Atlanta Falcons	2
Detroit Lions	2
Green Bay Packers	2
Philadelphia Eagles	2
Chicago Bears	1
San Francisco 49ers	1
New Orleans Saints	—
New York Giants	—
