= 1975 Minnesota Vikings season =

NFL team season

- General manager: Mike Lynn
- Head coach: Bud Grant
- Home stadium: Metropolitan Stadium

Results
- Record: 12–2
- Division place: 1st NFC Central
- Playoffs: Lost Divisional Playoffs (vs. Cowboys) 14–17
- All-Pros: RB Chuck Foreman (1st team); QB Fran Tarkenton (1st team); T Ron Yary (1st team); DT Alan Page (1st team); S Paul Krause (1st team)
- Pro Bowlers: CB Bobby Bryant; RB Chuck Foreman; WR John Gilliam; S Paul Krause; DT Alan Page; LB Jeff Siemon; QB Fran Tarkenton; G Ed White; T Ron Yary

Uniform
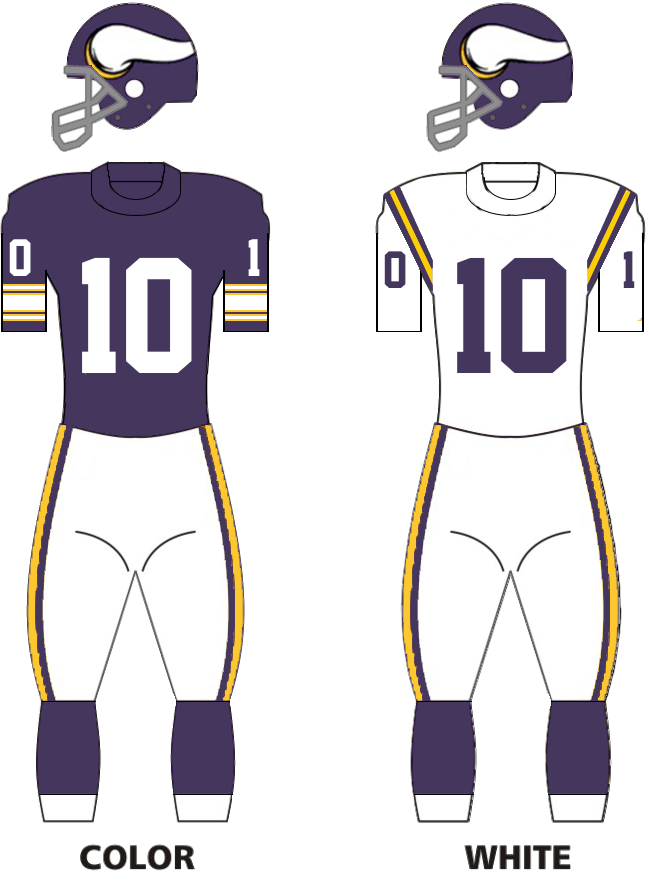

The 1975 season was the Minnesota Vikings' 15th in the National Football League.

The Vikings began with a 10-game win streak before losing by one point to the Washington Redskins, though there was generally very little expectation they would equal the 1972 Dolphins' perfect season. The 1975 Vikings had an even easier schedule than the often-criticized one of the unbeaten Dolphin team, and in fact had according to Eddie Epstein clearly the easiest schedule of any team between 1950 and 2001, with their fourteen opponents having a winning percentage excluding Vikings games of .346. According to Pro-Football-Reference.com, only the Super Bowl-winning 1999 Rams have since had a weaker schedule than the 1975 Vikings, playing only one opponent with a winning record during the regular season. Nine of fourteen opponents finished 4–10 or worse, and like the 1972 Dolphins only two had winning records. Football journalists noted during their streak how the Vikings had been playing very weak schedules for several seasons and flattered thereby.

The Vikings’ 10–0 start was not subsequently equaled until the 1984 Miami Dolphins began 11–0. They sealed their third straight NFC Central title on Thanksgiving Day in this same week when the Detroit Lions lost to the Los Angeles Rams.

The Vikings finished with a record of 12 wins and two losses, before losing to the Dallas Cowboys, 17–14 in the NFC Divisional Playoff Game at home due to a play known as the "Hail Mary". Earlier in the season, the New York Jets made their first appearance in Minnesota in a much-anticipated match between Super Bowl quarterbacks Fran Tarkenton and Joe Namath, in what had been the first regular season game sold out during the summer.

Third year halfback Chuck Foreman became the first Vikings running back to rush for 1,000 yards in a season.

== Offseason ==
=== 1975 draft ===
1975 Minnesota Vikings Draft
Draft order		Player name	Position	College	Notes
Round	Selection	Player name	Position	College	Notes
1	25	Mark Mullaney	Defensive end	Colorado State	
2	52	Robert Barber	Defensive tackle	USC	Originally Steelers pick (Note: The Vikings originally held the 51st overall selection but passed, allowing the Steelers to move up, before making their pick 52nd overall.)
3	63	Traded to the New Orleans Saints (Note: The Vikings traded the third-round selection they acquired from the Lions (63rd overall) to the New Orleans Saints in exchange for G Andy Maurer.)			From Lions (Note: The Vikings traded CB Charlie West to the Lions in exchange for a third-round selection (63rd overall).)
3	77	Traded to the Cincinnati Bengals (Note: The details of this trade are unknown.)			
4	89	Champ Henson	Running back	Ohio State	from Bengals
4	103	Bruce Adams	Wide receiver	Kansas	
5	129	Robert Miller	Running back	Kansas	
6	155	Bubba Broussard	Linebacker	Houston	
7	181	Henry Green	Running back	Southern	
8	207	Joe Hollimon	Defensive back	Arkansas State	
9	233	John Passananti	Guard	Western Illinois	
10	258	Neil Clabo	Punter	Tennessee	Originally Raiders pick (Note: The Vikings originally held the 259th overall selection but moved up to 258th overall when the Oakland Raiders passed.)
11	285	Ike Spencer	Running back	Utah	
12	311	Autry Beamon	Safety	East Texas State	
13	336	Mike Hurd	Wide receiver	Michigan State	Originally Redskins pick (Note: The Vikings originally held the 337th overall selection but moved up to 336th overall when the Washington Redskins passed on the 334th overall selection and allowed several teams to move up.)
14	363	Mike Strickland	Running back	Eastern Michigan	
15	388	Ollie Bakken	Linebacker	Minnesota	Originally Raiders pick (Note: The Vikings originally held the 389th overall selection but moved up to 388th overall when the Oakland Raiders passed.)
16	414	Tom Goedjen	Placekicker	Iowa State	Originally Colts pick (Note: The Vikings originally held the 415th overall selection but moved up to 414th overall when the Baltimore Colts passed.)
17	441	Adolph Bellizeare	Running back	Penn	

== Roster ==
1975 Minnesota Vikings roster
Quarterbacks (QB): 17 Bob Berry; 19 Bob Lee; 10 Fran Tarkenton; Running backs (RB): 44 Chuck Foreman; 49 Ed Marinaro; 33 Brent McClanahan; 35 Robert Miller; 41 Dave Osborn; Wide receivers (WR): 42 John Gilliam; 87 Clint Haslerig; 82 Jim Lash; 80 Sam McCullum; Tight ends (TE): 84 Steve Craig; 83 Stu Voigt	Offensive linemen (OL): 68 Charlie Goodrum T; 65 Steve Lawson G; 66 Andy Maurer G; 78 Steve Riley T; 53 Mick Tingelhoff C; 72 John Ward G; 62 Ed White G; 73 Ron Yary T; Defensive linemen (DL): 81 Carl Eller DE; 75 Bob Lurtsema DT; 70 Jim Marshall DE; 77 Mark Mullaney DE; 88 Alan Page DT; 69 Doug Sutherland DT	Linebackers (LB): 59 Matt Blair OLB; 58 Wally Hilgenberg OLB; 54 Fred McNeill OLB; 50 Jeff Siemon MLB; 56 Bob Stein MLB; 60 Roy Winston OLB; Defensive backs (DB): 45 Pete Athas CB; 27 Autry Beamon FS; 21 Joe Blahak CB; 24 Terry Brown SS; 20 Bobby Bryant CB; 22 Paul Krause FS; 43 Nate Wright CB; Special teams (ST): 12 Neil Clabo P; 14 Fred Cox K	Reserve: -- Scott Anderson C (DNR); 89 Doug Kingsriter TE (IR); 55 Amos Martin LB (IR); 23 Jeff Wright S (IR); Rookies in italics Source

== Preseason ==
Week	Date	Opponent	Result	Record	Venue	Attendance
1	August 9	New York Jets	L 15–20	0–1	Sun Devil Stadium, (Tempe, AZ)	51,323
2	August 17	at New England Patriots	L 10–36	0–2	Schaefer Stadium	40,218
3	August 23	at Dallas Cowboys	W 16–13	1–2	Texas Stadium	45,395
4	September 1	Miami Dolphins	W 20–7	2–2	Metropolitan Stadium	47,653
5	September 6	St. Louis Cardinals	L 6–13	2–3	Metropolitan Stadium	46,975
6	September 13	at San Diego Chargers	T 14–14 (OT)	2–3–1	San Diego Stadium	31,642

== Regular season ==
=== Schedule ===
Week	Date	Opponent	Result	Record	Venue	Attendance
1	September 21	**San Francisco 49ers**	**W** 27–17	1–0	Metropolitan Stadium	46,479
2	September 28	at Cleveland Browns	**W** 42–10	2–0	Cleveland Stadium	68,064
3	October 5	**Chicago Bears**	**W** 28–3	3–0	Metropolitan Stadium	47,578
4	October 12	**New York Jets**	**W** 29–21	4–0	Metropolitan Stadium	47,739
5	October 19	**Detroit Lions**	**W** 25–19	5–0	Metropolitan Stadium	47,872
6	October 27	at Chicago Bears	**W** 13–9	6–0	Soldier Field	51,259
7	November 2	at Green Bay Packers	**W** 28–17	7–0	Lambeau Field	57,267
8	November 9	**Atlanta Falcons**	**W** 38–0	8–0	Metropolitan Stadium	43,751
9	November 16	at New Orleans Saints	**W** 20–7	9–0	Louisiana Superdome	52,765
10	November 23	**San Diego Chargers**	**W** 28–13	10–0	Metropolitan Stadium	43,737
11	November 30	at Washington Redskins	**L** 30–31	10–1	RFK Stadium	54,498
12	December 7	**Green Bay Packers**	**W** 24–3	11–1	Metropolitan Stadium	46,147
13	December 14	at Detroit Lions	**L** 10–17	11–2	Silverdome	73,130
14	December 20	at Buffalo Bills	**W** 35–13	12–2	Rich Stadium	54,993
Note: Intra-division opponents are in **bold** text.

=== Game summaries ===
==== Week 1: vs. San Francisco 49ers ====
Week 1: San Francisco 49ers at Minnesota Vikings – Game summary

Quarter	1	2	3	4	Total
49ers	0	10	0	7	**17**
Vikings	3	10	0	14	**27**

at Metropolitan Stadium, Bloomington, Minnesota

- Date: September 21, 1975
- Game time: 1:00 p.m. CDT
- Game weather: 50 °F (10 °C)
- Game attendance: 46,479
- Pro-Football-Reference.com

Game information

**First quarter**

- MIN – Fred Cox 28-yard field goal. Vikings 3–0.

**Second quarter**

- MIN – Fred Cox 29-yard field goal. Vikings 6–0.
- MIN – Terry Brown 26-yard fumble return (Fred Cox kick). Vikings 13–0.
- SF – Steve Mike-Mayer 19-yard field goal. Vikings 13–3.
- SF – Gene Washington 22-yard pass from Norm Snead (Steve Mike-Mayer kick). Vikings 13–10.

**Third quarter**

- No scoring plays.

**Fourth quarter**

- MIN – Brent McClanahan 10-yard pass from Fran Tarkenton (Fred Cox kick). Vikings 20–10.
- MIN – Chuck Foreman 1-yard run (Fred Cox kick). Vikings 27–10.
- SF – Dave Washington 15-yard blocked punt return (Steve Mike-Mayer kick). Vikings 27–17.

**Top passers**

- SF – Norm Snead – 10/18, 149 yards, TD
- MIN – Fran Tarkenton – 14/26, 165 yards, TD, 2 INT

**Top rushers**

- SF – Wilbur Jackson – 15 rushes, 59 yards
- MIN – Brent McClanahan – 16 rushes, 61 yards

**Top receivers**

- SF – Gene Washington – 6 receptions, 86 yards, TD
- MIN – Brent McClanahan – 6 receptions, 73 yards, TD

=== Standings ===
NFC Central
	W	L	T	PCT	DIV	CONF	PF	PA	STK
^{(1)} Minnesota Vikings	12	2	0	.857	5–1	8–2	377	180	W1
Detroit Lions	7	7	0	.500	4–2	6–5	245	262	L1
Chicago Bears	4	10	0	.286	2–4	4–7	191	379	W1
Green Bay Packers	4	10	0	.286	1–5	4–7	226	285	W1

== Postseason ==
=== Schedule ===
Week	Date	Opponent	Result	Venue	Attendance
Divisional	December 28	Dallas Cowboys (4)	L 14–17	Metropolitan Stadium	46,425

=== Game summaries ===
==== NFC Divisional Playoffs: vs. (#4) Dallas Cowboys ====
NFC Divisional Playoff: (#4) Dallas Cowboys at (#1) Minnesota Vikings – Game summary

Quarter	1	2	3	4	Total
Cowboys	0	0	7	10	17
Vikings	0	7	0	7	14

at Metropolitan Stadium, Bloomington, Minnesota

- Date: December 28
- Game time: 1:00 p.m.
- Game weather: 25 °F (−4 °C)
- Referee: Chuck Heberling
- TV announcers (CBS): Gary Bender, Johnny Unitas
- Pro-Football-Reference.com

Game information

First quarter

- No scoring plays.

Second quarter

- MIN – Chuck Foreman 1-yard run (Fred Cox kick). Vikings 7–0.

Third quarter

- DAL – Doug Dennison 4-yard run (Toni Fritsch kick). Tied 7–7.

Fourth quarter

- DAL – Toni Fritsch 24-yard field goal. Cowboys 10–7.
- MIN – Brent McClanahan 1-yard run (Fred Cox kick). Vikings 14–10.
- DAL – Drew Pearson 50-yard pass from Roger Staubach (Toni Fritsch kick). Cowboys 17–14.

Top passers

- DAL – Roger Staubach – 17/29, 246 yards, TD
- MIN – Fran Tarkenton – 12/26, 135 yards, INT

Top rushers

- DAL – Doug Dennison – 11 rushes, 36 yards, TD
- MIN – Chuck Foreman – 18 rushes, 56 yards, TD

Top receivers

- DAL – Drew Pearson – 4 receptions, 91 yards, TD
- MIN – Ed Marinaro – 5 receptions, 64 yards

== Awards and records ==
- Fran Tarkenton, Bert Bell Award, and AP MVP
- AP First Team All-Pro selections: RB Chuck Foreman, S Paul Krause, DT Alan Page, QB Fran Tarkenton and T Ron Yary
- Chuck Foreman, set an NFL record with 73 receptions, most by a running back
- DE Jim Marshall, recovered 26th fumble, a new league record
- Pro Bowl selections: Bobby Bryant, Chuck Foreman, John Gilliam, Paul Krause, Alan Page, Jeff Siemon, Fran Tarkenton, Ed White and Ron Yary

== Statistics ==
=== Team leaders ===
Category	Player(s)	Value
Passing yards	Fran Tarkenton	2,994
Passing touchdowns	Fran Tarkenton	25
Rushing yards	Chuck Foreman	1,070
Rushing touchdowns	Chuck Foreman	13
Receiving yards	John Gilliam	777
Receiving touchdowns	Chuck Foreman	9
Points	Chuck Foreman	132
Kickoff return yards	Brent McClanahan	360
Punt return yards	Bobby Bryant	125
Interceptions	Paul Krause	10 *

* Vikings single season record.

=== League rankings ===
Category	Total yards	Yards per game	NFL rank (out of 26)
Passing offense	2,861	204.4	3rd
Rushing offense	2,094	149.6	10th
Total offense	4,955	353.9	5th
Passing defense	1,621	115.8	1st
Rushing defense	1,532	109.4	1st
Total defense	3,153	262.2	1st
