= 1975–76 NFL playoffs =

American football tournament

- Dates: December 27, 1975–January 18, 1976
- Season: 1975
- Teams: 8
- Games played: 7
- Super Bowl X site: Miami Orange Bowl; Miami, Florida
- Defending champions: Pittsburgh Steelers
- Champion: Pittsburgh Steelers (2nd title)
- Runner-up: Dallas Cowboys
- Conference runners-up: Los Angeles Rams; Oakland Raiders
NFL playoffs
← 1974–75	1976–77 →

The National Football League playoffs for the 1975 season began on December 27, 1975. The postseason tournament concluded with the Pittsburgh Steelers defeating the Dallas Cowboys in Super Bowl X, 21–17, on January 18, 1976, at the Orange Bowl in Miami.

This was the first season in which the league used a seeding system in the playoffs. Thus, the surviving clubs with the higher seeds were made the home teams for each playoff round. The three division champions in each conference were seeded 1 through 3 based on their regular season won-lost-tied record, and the wild card qualifier in each conference (i.e., the conference's top non-division winner with the best overall regular season record) became the 4 seed.

== Participants ==
Within each conference, the three division winners and the non-division winner with the best record qualified for the playoffs. The three division winners were seeded 1–3 based on their overall won-lost-tied record, and the wild card team was seeded 4. The first round, dubbed the divisional playoffs, had a restriction where two teams from the same division could not meet: the surviving wild card team visited the highest-seeded division champion that was outside its own division, and the remaining two teams from that conference played each other. The two surviving teams from each conference's divisional playoff games met in the respective AFC and NFC Conference Championship games, hosted by the higher seed. Although the Super Bowl, the championship round of the playoffs, was played at a neutral site, the designated home team was based on an annual rotation by conference.

Playoff seeds
Seed	AFC	NFC
1	Pittsburgh Steelers (Central winner)	Minnesota Vikings (Central winner)
2	Oakland Raiders (West winner)	Los Angeles Rams (West winner)
3	Baltimore Colts (East winner)	St. Louis Cardinals (East winner)
4	Cincinnati Bengals (wild card)	Dallas Cowboys (wild card)

== Bracket ==
Dec 28 – Metropolitan Stadium
4	Dallas	17
Jan 4 – Los Angeles Memorial Coliseum
1	Minnesota	14
NFC
4	Dallas	37
Dec 27 – Los Angeles Memorial Coliseum
2	Los Angeles	7
NFC Championship
3	St. Louis	23
Jan 18 – Miami Orange Bowl
2	Los Angeles	35
Divisional playoffs
N4	Dallas	17
Dec 28 – Oakland Coliseum
A1	Pittsburgh	21
Super Bowl X
4	Cincinnati	28
Jan 4 – Three Rivers Stadium
2	Oakland	31
AFC
2	Oakland	10
Dec 27 – Three Rivers Stadium
1	Pittsburgh	16
AFC Championship
3	Baltimore	10
1	Pittsburgh	28

== Schedule ==
In the United States, NBC broadcast the AFC playoff games, while CBS televised the NFC games and Super Bowl X.

Round	Away team	Score	Home team	Date	Kickoff (ET / UTC−5)	TV
Divisional round	Baltimore Colts	10–28	Pittsburgh Steelers	December 27, 1975	1:00 p.m.	NBC
Divisional round	St. Louis Cardinals	23–35	Los Angeles Rams	December 27, 1975	4:00 p.m.	CBS
Divisional round	Dallas Cowboys	17–14	Minnesota Vikings	December 28, 1975	1:00 p.m.	CBS
Divisional round	Cincinnati Bengals	28–31	Oakland Raiders	December 28, 1975	4:00 p.m.	NBC
Conference championships	Oakland Raiders	10–16	Pittsburgh Steelers	January 4, 1976	1:00 p.m.	NBC
Conference championships	Dallas Cowboys	37–7	Los Angeles Rams	January 4, 1976	4:00 p.m.	CBS
Super Bowl X Miami Orange Bowl Miami, Florida	Dallas Cowboys	17–21	Pittsburgh Steelers	January 18, 1976	2:00 p.m.	CBS

== Divisional round ==
=== Saturday, December 27, 1975 ===
==== AFC: Pittsburgh Steelers 28, Baltimore Colts 10 ====
Baltimore Colts vs. Pittsburgh Steelers – Game summary

Quarter	1	2	3	4	Total
Colts	0	7	3	0	10
Steelers	7	0	7	14	28

at Three Rivers Stadium, Pittsburgh, Pennsylvania

- Game time: 1:00 p.m. EST
- Game attendance: 49,557
- Referee: Pat Haggerty
- TV announcers (NBC): Jim Simpson, John Brodie, and Don Meredith

Game information

First quarter

- PIT – Franco Harris 8-yard run (Roy Gerela kick). Steelers 7–0.

Second quarter

- BAL – Glenn Doughty 5-yard pass from Marty Domres (Toni Linhart kick). Tied 7–7.

Third quarter

- BAL – Toni Linhart 27-yard field goal. Colts 10–7.
- PIT – Rocky Bleier 7-yard run (Roy Gerela kick). Steelers 14–10.

Fourth quarter

- PIT – Terry Bradshaw 2-yard run (Roy Gerela kick). Steelers 21–10.
- PIT – Andy Russell 93-yard fumble return (Roy Gerela kick). Steelers 28–10.

Top passers

- BAL – Bert Jones – 6/11, 91 yards
- PIT – Terry Bradshaw – 8/13, 103 yards, 2 INT

Top rushers

- BAL – Lydell Mitchell – 26 rushes, 63 yards
- PIT – Franco Harris – 27 rushes, 153 yards, TD

Top receivers

- BAL – Glenn Doughty – 2 receptions, 63 yards, TD
- PIT – Frank Lewis – 3 receptions, 65 yards

Despite losing 5 turnovers, the Steelers forced 3 turnovers and held the Colts to 154 total yards of offense, while Pittsburgh's Franco Harris shredded Baltimore's defense with 153 rushing yards and a touchdown.

The Steelers scored first after linebacker Jack Ham's interception set up a 61-yard touchdown drive. Terry Bradshaw's 34-yard completion to receiver Frank Lewis paved the way for Harris's 8-yard scoring run. Baltimore responded in the second quarter when Lloyd Mumphord returned an interception 58 yards to set up Glenn Doughty's 5-yard touchdown catch from Marty Domres. Then Harris lost a fumble that was recovered by Nelson Munsey on the Steelers 19, leading to Toni Linhart's 27-yard field goal that gave Baltimore a 10–7 lead early in the second half.

On the second half kickoff, Munsey recovered a fumble from Steelers returner Dave Brown. But a few plays later, Pittsburgh cornerback Mel Blount intercepted a pass and returned it 20 yards to the Baltimore 7-yard line. From there, Rocky Bleier scored on a 7-yard rushing touchdown giving the Steelers a 14–10 lead. In the fourth quarter, a short punt from David Lee gave the Steelers favorable field position, and they scored on Bradshaw's 2-yard run, increasing their lead to 21–10. Now with the game slipping away, Colts coach Ted Marchibroda benched Domres (who had completed only 2 of 11 passes) and replaced him with Bert Jones (who had earlier left the game due to injury), who promptly gave the team a golden opportunity to rally back with a 58-yard completion to Doughty on the Steelers 3-yard line. But on the next play, Ham knocked the ball out of Jones's hand as he was winding up for a pass. Linebacker Andy Russell recovered the fumble and returned it for a then NFL playoff record 93 yards to the end zone. Russell's play is claimed by some as the longest single football play in time duration. Sports Illustrated called the play the "longest, slowest touchdown ever witnessed."

"That play has been a source of embarrassment for me for years", said Russell several years later. "There have been so many jokes. Ray Mansfield was the one that said NBC cut to a commercial during the return and came back to catch me score the touchdown. Nonetheless, it was a memorable play in my career."

The game is also notable in that it was the debut game for Steelers fans' Terrible Towels.

This was the first postseason meeting between the Colts and Steelers.

==== NFC: Los Angeles Rams 35, St. Louis Cardinals 23 ====
St. Louis Cardinals vs. Los Angeles Rams – Game summary

Quarter	1	2	3	4	Total
Cardinals	0	9	7	7	23
Rams	14	14	0	7	35

at Los Angeles Memorial Coliseum, Los Angeles

- Game time: 4:00 p.m. EST
- Game attendance: 73,459
- Referee: Dick Jorgensen
- TV announcers (CBS): Frank Glieber and Hank Stram

Game information

First quarter

- LA – Ron Jaworski 5-yard run (Tom Dempsey kick). Rams 7–0.
- LA – Jack Youngblood 47-yard interception return (Tom Dempsey kick). Rams 14–0.

Second quarter

- LA – Bill Simpson 65-yard interception return (Tom Dempsey kick). Rams 21–0.
- STL – Jim Otis 3-yard run (kick blocked). Rams 21–6.
- LA – Harold Jackson 66-yard pass from Ron Jaworski (Tom Dempsey kick). Rams 28–6.
- STL – Jim Bakken 29-yard field goal. Rams 28–9.

Third quarter

- STL – Mel Gray 11-yard pass from Jim Hart (Jim Bakken kick). Rams 28–16.

Fourth quarter

- LA – Ron Jessie 2-yard fumble return (Tom Dempsey kick). Rams 35–16.
- STL – Steve Jones 3-yard run (Jim Bakken kick). Rams 35–23.

Top passers

- STL – Jim Hart – 22/41, 291 yards, TD, 3 INT
- LA – Ron Jaworski – 12/23, 203 yards, TD

Top rushers

- STL – Jim Otis – 12 rushes, 38 yards, TD
- LA – Lawrence McCutcheon – 37 rushes, 202 yards

Top receivers

- STL – Terry Metcalf – 6 receptions, 94 yards
- LA – Harold Jackson – 2 receptions, 84 yards, TD

The Rams defense scored 2 touchdowns in the first half while running back Lawrence McCutcheon ran for an NFL playoff record 202 yards on 37 carries. Los Angeles started the game off with a 79-yard scoring drive, 51 of them from McCutcheon, on the way to a 5-yard touchdown run by quarterback Ron Jaworski. Then on the first Cardinals play, Rams linebacker Jack Youngblood intercepted a pass from Jim Hart and returned it 47 yards for a touchdown. St. Louis returner Terry Metcalf gave his team a chance to get back in the game with a 67-yard kickoff return, but they lost the ball again when Youngblood forced a fumble from Jim Otis that Fred Dryer recovered. Later on, Bill Simpson intercepted a pass from Hart on the first play of the second quarter and returned it 65 yards for a touchdown, making the score 21–0.

Dwayne Crump returned the ensuing kickoff 28 yards to the St. Louis 40-yard line, and the team came back to score on an 8-play, 60-yard drive, featuring a 21-yard reception by running back Jim Otis. Otis finished the possession with a 3-yard touchdown run, but the extra point was blocked by Youngblood and the Rams responded on the first play of their next drive with Jaworski's 66-yard touchdown pass to Harold Jackson, making the score 28–6. Shortly before the end of the half, Hart completed a 23-yard pass to Mel Gray that set up Jim Bakken's 39-yard field goal, cutting the score to 28-9 going into intermission.

In the third quarter, the Cardinals drove 80 yards in 12 plays, including a 19-yard reception by Metcalf, to score on Hart's 11-yard touchdown pass to Gray and cut their deficit to 28–16. But in the fourth quarter, Simpson intercepted another pass and returned this one 28 yards to the Cardinals 36-yard line. Receiver Ron Jessie eventually scored the final touchdown for the Rams when he recovered a fumble from McCutcheon and ran it into the end zone with just over 4 minutes left in the game. By the time Cardinals running back Steve Jones finished the ensuing 68-yard, 12-play drive with a 3-yard touchdown run, the game was well out of reach.

Youngblood had an outstanding performance. In addition to his 47-yard interception return for a touchdown, he also recorded a sack, blocked an extra point, and forced a fumble. Meftcalf racked up 229 total yards, (8 carries for 27 yards, 6 receptions for 94 yards, 2 kickoff returns for 102 yards, 2 punt returns for 6 yards). Jaworski completed 12/23 passes for 203 yards and a touchdown. Hart completed 22 of 41 passes for 291 yards and a touchdown, but was intercepted 3 times.

This was the Cardinals' last playoff game until 1982, and their last in a non-strike season until 1998, a decade after the franchise moved to Arizona.

This was the first postseason meeting between the Cardinals and Rams.

=== Sunday, December 28, 1975 ===
==== NFC: Dallas Cowboys 17, Minnesota Vikings 14 ====
Dallas Cowboys vs. Minnesota Vikings – Game summary

Quarter	1	2	3	4	Total
Cowboys	0	0	7	10	17
Vikings	0	7	0	7	14

at Metropolitan Stadium, Bloomington, Minnesota

- Game time: 1:00 p.m. EST
- Game attendance: 48,050
- Referee: Chuck Heberling
- TV announcers (CBS): Gary Bender and Johnny Unitas
- Boxscore

Game information

First quarter

- No scoring plays.

Second quarter

- MIN – Chuck Foreman 1-yard run (Fred Cox kick). Vikings 7–0.

Third quarter

- DAL – Doug Dennison 4-yard run (Toni Fritsch kick). Tied 7–7.

Fourth quarter

- DAL – Toni Fritsch 24-yard field goal. Cowboys 10–7.
- MIN – Brent McClanahan 1-yard run (Fred Cox kick). Vikings 14–10.
- DAL – Drew Pearson 50-yard pass from Roger Staubach (Toni Fritsch kick). Cowboys 17–14.

Top passers

- DAL – Roger Staubach – 17/29, 246 yards, TD
- MIN – Fran Tarkenton – 12/26, 135 yards, INT

Top rushers

- DAL – Doug Dennison – 11 rushes, 36 yards, TD
- MIN – Chuck Foreman – 18 rushes, 56 yards, TD

Top receivers

- DAL – Drew Pearson – 4 receptions, 91 yards, TD
- MIN – Ed Marinaro – 5 receptions, 64 yards

With 24 seconds to play, Cowboys quarterback Roger Staubach threw a 50-yard winning touchdown pass to wide receiver Drew Pearson on a play that became known as the Hail Mary pass. Pearson's last-minute touchdown reception remains strong in Cowboys lore and sour with Vikings fans. To them, Pearson's touchdown should never have counted because they contend the officials missed two calls on the final Dallas drive, including offensive pass interference on Pearson in the touchdown reception.

The defenses of both teams dominated the first half. The Vikings' longest gain was a 16-yard run by quarterback Fran Tarkenton early in the second quarter. The Vikings eventually punted, and the ball hit the ground near returner Cliff Harris. Thinking that Harris had touched the ball, Dallas's Pat Donovan tried to dive on it, but the ball slipped away and was recovered by Minnesota's Fred McNeill on the Cowboys' 4-yard line. Chuck Foreman eventually took the ball into the end zone on a 1-yard score for a 7–0 Vikings lead. The Cowboys were able to move the ball on their next two drives, but the first ended with a missed field goal, and after a Mel Renfro interception sparked a drive to the Vikings 24, the Cowboys failed to convert a fourth-and-inches situation and the score was 7–0 at halftime.

Dallas mounted the first sustained scoring drive of the game with their first second-half possession. A late hit by Vikings linebacker Wally Hilgenberg turned Preston Pearson's 14-yard reception into a 29-yard gain. Then Staubach hit tight end Billy Joe Dupree for 17 yards to the Vikings' 19. Doug Dennison then rumbled for a 10-yard carry, and three plays later he tied the game on a 4-yard scoring run.

Early in the fourth quarter, Dallas took a 10–7 lead on a 24-yard field goal by Toni Fritsch. Following an exchange of punts, Tarkenton completed four of six passes for 37 yards on a 70-yard, 11-play drive, which included a 13-yard run on a reverse by Brent McClanahan. The third-year running back eventually finished the drive with a 1-yard touchdown run, giving the Vikings a 14–10 lead with 5:24 remaining. Dallas went three-and-out on its ensuing drive, giving the ball back to Minnesota with 3:12 left and giving the Vikings a chance to run out the clock. They forced Dallas to use up all of its timeouts, but on a third-and-two, Cowboys safety Charlie Waters broke through Foreman's block attempt and tackled Tarkenton for a 3-yard loss as time ran down to the two-minute warning. "That play cost us the game," Tarkenton later said. "It wasn't the Hail Mary pass. We had the game in control but didn't make the play."

The Cowboys got the ball back on their own 15-yard line with only 1:51 left. Staubach started the drive with a pair of completions to Pearson, who had not yet caught a pass in the game, moving the ball to the Dallas 31. However, on the next play, Staubach fumbled a low snap in shotgun formation and was downed for an 8-yard loss. A few plays later, facing fourth-down-and-16, he threw a 25-yard completion to Pearson to set up the winning "Hail Mary" pass. The fourth-and-16 completion foreshadowed events to come with its own controversy. Minnesota argued that Pearson would have been out of bounds regardless of a push when he made the catch. The official ruled he was forced out by Nate Wright. At the time, a catch by a receiver who was forced out of bounds in midair by a defender counted as a reception (this rule would change in 2008).

These two would participate in a more controversial play two plays later. After Preston Pearson dropped a wide-open pass in the middle of the field with 32 seconds left, Staubach launched a bomb to Drew Pearson, who caught the ball through tight coverage by Wright at the 4-yard line and ran into the end zone for a 50-yard scoring reception that Staubach, in a postgame interview, called a "Hail Mary" pass. That popularized the term to describe such a play. Wright, who was just in front of Pearson, fell as the ball came down, and the Vikings argued that Pearson pushed off and should have been flagged for offensive interference. The play drew the ire of Minnesota's Alan Page, who was ejected for unsportsmanlike conduct for arguing with officials, and a 15-yard penalty was assessed that allowed Dallas to kick off from the 50. Tarkenton then vehemently argued with the referees but to no avail. Meanwhile, angry Minnesota fans threw objects onto the field, one of which was a liquor bottle that struck official Armen Terzian in the head, creating a forehead gash and rendering him unconscious. Terzian wore a bandage, later requiring 11 stitches, as he walked off the field. He was replaced by substitute official Charley Musser for the final two plays. The NFL later banned glass bottles from being sold at stadiums. The fan who threw the glass bottle at Terzian eventually was found by police, pleaded guilty to misdemeanor assault, and was sentenced to a $100 fine. Meanwhile, the Cowboys "Doomsday Defense" put the finishing touches on the team's victory by sacking Tarkenton on each of the final two plays of the game.

The Vikings had finished with an NFC-best 12–2 record. Their defense led the league with the fewest yards allowed. Tarkenton had won the NFL Most Valuable Player Award, and the NFL Offensive Player of the Year Award, while Foreman amassed 1,761 all-purpose yards and 22 touchdowns. Tarkenton soon learned his father had died of a heart attack while watching the game. The upstart and youthful Cowboys, not expected to do much after an 8–6 season in 1974 and the loss of several key veterans, would defeat the Rams and lose to Pittsburgh in the Super Bowl.

Staubach finished 17 of 29 for 246 yards and a touchdown and rushed for 24 yards. Drew Pearson caught four passes for 91 yards, all on Dallas's final game-winning drive. Foreman was the game's top rusher with 56 yards and a touchdown, and caught four passes for 42 yards. Dallas outgained Minnesota 356 yards to 215.

This was the third postseason game between the Cowboys and Vikings. The teams split the previous two meetings.

Previous playoff games
Tied 1–1 in all-time playoff games

1971

Dallas Cowboys 20 @ Minnesota Vikings 12

1971 NFC Divisional playoffs

1973

Minnesota Vikings 27 @ Dallas Cowboys 10

1973 NFC Championship Game

==== AFC: Oakland Raiders 31, Cincinnati Bengals 28 ====
Cincinnati Bengals vs. Oakland Raiders – Game summary

Quarter	1	2	3	4	Total
Bengals	0	7	7	14	28
Raiders	3	14	7	7	31

at Oakland Coliseum, Oakland, California

- Game time: 4:00 p.m. EST
- Game attendance: 53,030
- Referee: Jim Tunney
- TV announcers (NBC): Curt Gowdy and Al DeRogatis

Game information

First quarter

- OAK – George Blanda 27-yard field goal. Raiders 3–0.

Second quarter

- OAK – Mike Siani 9-yard pass from Ken Stabler (George Blanda kick). Raiders 10–0.
- CIN – Stan Fritts 1-yard run (Dave Green kick). Raiders 10–7.
- OAK – Bob Moore 8-yard pass from Ken Stabler (George Blanda kick). Raiders 17–7.

Third quarter

- OAK – Pete Banaszak 6-yard run (George Blanda kick). Raiders 24–7.
- CIN – Lenvil Elliott 6-yard run (Dave Green kick). Raiders 24–14.

Fourth quarter

- OAK – Dave Casper 2-yard pass from Ken Stabler (George Blanda kick). Raiders 31–14.
- CIN – Charlie Joiner 25-yard pass from Ken Anderson (Dave Green kick). Raiders 31–21.
- CIN – Isaac Curtis 14-yard pass from Ken Anderson (Dave Green kick). Raiders 31–28.

Top passers

- CIN – Ken Anderson – 17/27, 201 yards, 2 TD
- OAK – Ken Stabler – 17/23, 199 yards, 3 TD, INT

Top rushers

- CIN – Boobie Clark – 8 rushes, 46 yards
- OAK – Clarence Davis – 16 rushes, 63 yards

Top receivers

- CIN – Chip Myers – 3 receptions, 67 yards
- OAK – Cliff Branch – 5 receptions, 89 yards

The Raiders outgained Cincinnati in total yards 358–258, rushing yards 173–97, and first downs 27–17, while also recording five sacks, jumping to a 31–14 lead, and holding off a frantic Bengals comeback in the final period.

Oakland kicker George Blanda made a 31-yard field goal, while quarterback Ken Stabler threw two touchdown passes in the first half, one for 9 yards to Mike Siani and an 8-yard one to Bob Moore. Cincinnati's lone score in the first half was an 8-play, 65-yard drive ending with a 1-yard touchdown run by running back Stan Fritts. The Raiders then scored on their first drive of the second half with running back Pete Banaszak's 6-yard touchdown run to take a 24–7 lead. Then after the Bengals marched 91 yards to cut the lead, 24–14, with Lenvil Elliott's 6-yard touchdown run, Stabler threw his third touchdown pass of the game, this time a 2-yard pass to tight end Dave Casper.

Trailing 31–14 in the fourth quarter, the Bengals managed to come back with two unanswered touchdowns. First, Ken Riley intercepted a pass from Stabler and returned it 34 yards to the Raiders 34-yard line, setting up Ken Anderson's 25-yard touchdown pass to Charlie Joiner. Then the Bengals defense forced Oakland to punt for the first time in the game, and Ray Guy's kick went just 38 yards. Three minutes later, Anderson's 14-yard touchdown pass to Isaac Curtis cut the score to 31–28. With 4:19 left in the game, Bengals defensive end Ron Carpenter recovered a Banaszak fumble on the Raiders 37-yard line. But on the next play, linebacker Ted Hendricks sacked Anderson for an 8-yard loss, pushing the Bengals out of field goal range. Anderson completed a 5-yard pass to Bruce Coslet on second down, but his next two passes were incomplete, resulting in a turnover. The Bengals managed to force a punt with 50 seconds left, but on a desperate attempt to block the kick that narrowly missed, linebacker Chris Devlin ran into Guy, drawing a penalty that gave the Raiders a first down and let them run out the clock.

"Al Davis went to a lot of trouble to get Hendricks on his team", Bengals coach Paul Brown bitterly remarked after the game. "And today it finally paid off for him". "I've never been prouder of a football team than the Cincinnati team we brought in here today", he added. "They never quit."

Stabler threw for 199 yards and three touchdowns, with 1 interception. Anderson threw for 201 yards and two touchdowns.

This was the first postseason meeting between the Bengals and Raiders.

== Conference championships ==
=== Sunday, January 4, 1976 ===
==== AFC: Pittsburgh Steelers 16, Oakland Raiders 10 ====
Oakland Raiders vs. Pittsburgh Steelers – Game summary

Quarter	1	2	3	4	Total
Raiders	0	0	0	10	10
Steelers	0	3	0	13	16

at Three Rivers Stadium, Pittsburgh, Pennsylvania

- Game time: 1:00 p.m. EST
- Game weather: 15 °F (−9 °C), cloudy, field icy
- Game attendance: 50,609
- Referee: Ben Dreith
- TV announcers (NBC): Curt Gowdy, Al DeRogatis, and Don Meredith

Game information

First quarter

- No scoring plays.

Second quarter

- PIT – Roy Gerela 36-yard field goal. Steelers 3–0.

Third quarter

- No scoring plays.

Fourth quarter

- PIT – Franco Harris 25-yard run (Roy Gerela kick). Steelers 10–0.
- OAK – Mike Siani 14-yard pass from Ken Stabler (George Blanda kick). Steelers 10–7.
- PIT – John Stallworth 20-yard pass from Terry Bradshaw (kick failed). Steelers 16–7.
- OAK – George Blanda 41-yard field goal. Steelers 16–10.

Top passers

- OAK – Ken Stabler – 18/42, 246 yards, TD, 2 INT
- PIT – Terry Bradshaw – 15/25, 215 yards, TD, 3 INT

Top rushers

- OAK – Pete Banaszak – 8 rushes, 33 yards
- PIT – Franco Harris – 27 rushes, 79 yards, TD

Top receivers

- OAK – Mike Siani – 5 receptions, 80 yards, TD
- PIT – Franco Harris – 5 receptions, 58 yards

A defensive struggle in which both teams combined for 12 turnovers (7 for Pittsburgh, 5 for Oakland) turned into an offensive battle as the Steelers managed to stop the Raiders' final drive for the winning score as time ran out.

As the two dominant teams of the era in the AFC, Oakland and Pittsburgh would eventually face off in five consecutive playoff games from 1972 to 1976, including three consecutive AFC Championship games from 1974 to 1976.

Already bitter rivals dating back to the 1972 AFC Divisional Playoff game (see: the Immaculate Reception), Raiders' officials, including team owner Al Davis and head coach John Madden, accused the Steelers and Three Rivers Stadium groundskeepers of intentionally allowing the artificial playing surface to ice over, in an effort to slow Oakland's propensity for using a wide-open aerial attack as part of its offensive game plan.

The game started out ugly, as Pittsburgh quarterback Terry Bradshaw was picked off twice in the first quarter. However, Oakland fared no better, as George Blanda's missed 38-yard field goal attempt after Bradshaw's second interception was the closest they would get to scoring in the first half. In the second quarter, Steelers safety Mike Wagner intercepted a pass from Ken Stabler to set up Roy Gerela's 36-yard field goal.

This would be the only score of the first three quarters. In the third quarter, the Raiders blew two big scoring chances. After recovering a fumbled punt by the Steelers, the Raiders got a first down on the Pittsburgh 16-yard line. Then quarterback Ken Stabler threw a short pass to Pete Banaszak, only to watch him fumble the ball as he turned upfield, and linebacker Jack Lambert recovered it. Then after Jack Tatum recovered a fumble from Lynn Swann at midfield, Oakland gave the ball back again when Lambert recovered a fumble from running back Clarence Davis on the Steelers 30-yard line. The turnover led to a 5-play, 70-yard drive that ended on running back Franco Harris's 25-yard touchdown run to give the Steelers a 10–0 lead. Oakland stormed back, scoring in less than two minutes on a drive that lasted just six plays, three of them receptions by tight end Dave Casper. Stabler finished the drive with a 14-yard touchdown pass to Mike Siani that made the score 10–7.

Midway through the fourth quarter, Lambert recorded his third fumble recovery, this one from running back Marv Hubbard on the Oakland 25, setting up Bradshaw's 20-yard touchdown pass to receiver John Stallworth. Bobby Walden fumbled the snap on the PAT, which kicker Roy Gerela recovered but failed to convert on a drop kick, keeping the score at 16–7. Later on, Bradshaw was knocked out of the game when he took a knee-hit to the head by linebacker Monte Johnson. A few plays later, Oakland recovered their fourth fumble of the day with 1:31 left in the game. The Raiders then drove to the Pittsburgh 24-yard line, where they faced third down and 2 yards to go with 18 seconds left on the clock. They opted to have George Blanda kick a 41-yard field goal (his longest of the season and last of his NFL career) to pull the deficit to 6 points. Then Hubbard recovered the ensuing onside kick with 9 seconds remaining to give Oakland one last attempt to win the game. Cliff Branch then caught a 37-yard reception, but he was stopped at the Pittsburgh 15-yard line by Steelers cornerback Mel Blount before he could get out of bounds and the clock ran out, sealing Pittsburgh's victory. Aside from his touchdown run, Harris ran for 54 yards on 26 carries, while also catching 5 passes for 58 yards.

Raiders defender George Atkinson knocked Swann into a severe concussion that would have him hospitalized for 2 days. Swann, however would go on to win the Super Bowl MVP award with yardage records. Lambert set an AFC Championship Game record with three fumble recoveries in the game. This was Oakland's 6th AFC championship loss in the last 8 years.

This was the fourth postseason meeting between the Raiders and Steelers. Pittsburgh won two of the prior three meetings.

Previous playoff games
Pittsburgh leads 2–1 in all-time playoff games

1972

Oakland Raiders 7 @ Pittsburgh Steelers 13

1972 AFC Divisional playoffs

1973

Pittsburgh Steelers 14 @ Oakland Raiders 33

1973 AFC Divisional playoffs

1974

Pittsburgh Steelers 24 @ Oakland Raiders 13

1974 AFC Championship Game

==== NFC: Dallas Cowboys 37, Los Angeles Rams 7 ====
Dallas Cowboys vs. Los Angeles Rams – Game summary

Quarter	1	2	3	4	Total
Cowboys	7	14	13	3	37
Rams	0	0	0	7	7

at Los Angeles Memorial Coliseum, Los Angeles

- Game time: 4:00 p.m. EST
- Game attendance: 88,919
- Referee: Tommy Bell
- TV announcers (CBS): Vin Scully and Sonny Jurgensen

Game information

First quarter

- DAL – Preston Pearson 18-yard pass from Roger Staubach (Toni Fritsch kick). Cowboys 7–0.

Second quarter

- DAL – Golden Richards 4-yard pass from Roger Staubach (Toni Fritsch kick). Cowboys 14–0.
- DAL – Preston Pearson 15-yard pass from Roger Staubach (Toni Fritsch kick). Cowboys 21–0.

Third quarter

- DAL – Preston Pearson 19-yard pass from Roger Staubach (Toni Fritsch kick). Cowboys 28–0.
- DAL – Toni Fritsch 40-yard field goal. Cowboys 31–0.
- DAL – Toni Fritsch 26-yard field goal. Cowboys 34–0.

Fourth quarter

- LA – John Cappelletti 1-yard run (Tom Dempsey kick). Cowboys 34–7.
- DAL – Toni Fritsch 26-yard field goal. Cowboys 37–7.

Top passers

- DAL – Roger Staubach – 16/26, 220 yards, 4 TD, INT
- LA – Ron Jaworski – 11/22, 147 yards, 2 INT

Top rushers

- DAL – Robert Newhouse – 16 rushes, 64 yards
- LA – Ron Jaworski – 2 rushes, 12 yards

Top receivers

- DAL – Preston Pearson – 7 receptions, 123 yards, 3 TD
- LA – Ron Jessie – 4 receptions, 52 yards

Quarterback Roger Staubach threw for 220 yards and 4 touchdown passes while also rushing for 54 yards as the Cowboys upset the favored Rams. The first passing attempt by Los Angeles quarterback James Harris, who was coming off an injury and making his first start since the 13th game of the season, was intercepted by Dallas linebacker D.D. Lewis. This set up Staubach's first touchdown pass, a screen to running back Preston Pearson for 18 yards. A 4-yard touchdown reception by Golden Richards and a diving catch in the end zone by Pearson put the Cowboys up 21–0 by halftime. Dallas scored again on their first drive of the second half on a shovel pass to Pearson for his third touchdown reception of the game. Toni Fritsch later added three field goals. Harris gave way to backup Ron Jaworski, but only John Cappelletti's 1-yard touchdown run in the fourth quarter prevented the Rams from being shut out. Pearson finished the game with 7 receptions for 123 yards, 3 touchdowns, and 20 rushing yards. The Dallas defense allowed only 118 yards, a mere 22 on the ground, and sacked Jaworski 5 times.

This was the second postseason meeting between the Cowboys and Rams, Dallas winning the only previous meeting.

Previous playoff games
Dallas leads 1–0 in all-time playoff games

1973

Los Angeles Rams 16 @ Dallas Cowboys 27

1973 NFC Divisional playoffs

== Super Bowl X: Pittsburgh Steelers 21, Dallas Cowboys 17 ==
Super Bowl X – Dallas Cowboys vs. Pittsburgh Steelers – Game summary

Quarter	1	2	3	4	Total
Cowboys (NFC)	7	3	0	7	17
Steelers (AFC)	7	0	0	14	21

at Orange Bowl, Miami, Florida

- Date: January 18, 1976
- Game attendance: 80,187
- Referee: Norm Schachter
- TV announcers (CBS): Pat Summerall, Tom Brookshier and Hank Stram

This was the first Super Bowl meeting between the Cowboys and Steelers.
