= Charley Young =

American football player (born 1952)

No. 30
- Position: Running back

Personal information
- Born: October 13, 1952 (age 74); Raleigh, North Carolina, U.S.
- Listed height: 6 ft 1 in (1.85 m)
- Listed weight: 230 lb (104 kg)

Career information
- High school: William G. Enloe (Raleigh)
- College: North Carolina State
- NFL draft: 1974: 1st round, 22nd overall pick

Career history
- Dallas Cowboys (1974–1977)

Awards and highlights
- Super Bowl champion (XII)

Career NFL statistics
- Rushing attempts: 131
- Rushing yards: 638
- Receptions: 40
- Receiving yards: 391
- Total touchdowns: 4
- Stats at Pro Football Reference

Charles Lee Young (born October 13, 1952) is an American former professional football player who was a running back for the Dallas Cowboys of the National Football League (NFL). He played college football for the NC State Wolfpack and was selected in the first round of the 1974 NFL draft with the 22nd overall pick.

== Early life and college ==
Following a standout high school sports career at William G. Enloe High School, in 1970, Young and Willie Burden became the first African-Americans recruited to the North Carolina State University football team. He also was a part of the track team.

As a sophomore in 1971, he was second on the team behind Burden with 85 carries for 385 yards (4.5-yard avg.) and 2 rushing touchdowns.

In 1972, when Lou Holtz arrived as the new head coach at North Carolina State University, he implemented split-back veer offense to take advantage of the talent at running back, that included Young, Burden, Stan Fritts and Roland Hooks. At the time, this was arguably the best group of running backs in the nation, they were known as "The Four Stallions" and everyone of them went on to play in a professional football league. He was second on the team behind Fritts with 118 carries for 611 yards (5.2-yard avg.) and 7 rushing touchdowns.

In 1973, he was part of the Atlantic Coast Conference championship team as the starting fullback. He was third on the team behind Burden and Fritts, with 114 carries for 661 yards (5.8-yard avg.) and 7 rushing touchdowns.

Young finished his college career with 317 carries for 1,657 rushing yards, 17 touchdowns and averaged 5.2 yards per carry. He played in the 1973 East–West Shrine Game.

== Professional career ==
In the 1974 NFL draft, the Dallas Cowboys had two first round draft choices. With the first one they selected Ed "Too Tall" Jones. The team was targeting Lynn Swann with their second first-round pick, but selected Young instead, after Swann was taken by the Pittsburgh Steelers. He was considered a prospect at both fullback and halfback, because of his 4.6 speed. As a rookie he saw most of his playing time at fullback, running for 205 yards on 33 carries, with a 6.2-yard average and a 53-yard run against the Houston Oilers, which was the team's longest of the year.

In 1975, he competed with Doug Dennison for the starting halfback job left vacated by Calvin Hill. He ended up in a reserve role, moving from halfback to fullback during the first half of the season. He experienced foot problems, but was able to focus on the halfback position at the end of the year. He registered 225 rushing yards and 2 touchdowns.

In 1976, he earned the starting halfback job during the pre-season, but after registering a total of 57 rushing yards in the first 2 games, he gave way in the lineup to Dennison. He posted 208 rushing yards rushing (4.3-yard average), 12 receptions for 134 yards and his only touchdown.

Young suffered a torn medial collateral ligament in his left knee during the 1977 training camp and was placed on the injured reserve list on August 11. He returned in 1978 and was released on August 24.

== NFL career statistics ==
Legend
**Bold**	Career high

=== Regular season ===
Year	Team	Games		Rushing					Receiving				
Year	Team	GP	GS	Att	Yds	Avg	Lng	TD	Rec	Yds	Avg	Lng	TD
1974	DAL	**14**	0	33	205	**6.2**	**53**	0	11	73	6.6	14	0
1975	DAL	12	1	**50**	**225**	4.5	29	**2**	**18**	**184**	10.2	**42**	**1**
1976	DAL	11	**2**	48	208	4.3	24	0	11	134	**12.2**	25	**1**
		37	3	131	638	4.9	53	2	40	391	9.8	42	2

=== Playoffs ===
Year	Team	Games		Rushing					Receiving				
Year	Team	GP	GS	Att	Yds	Avg	Lng	TD	Rec	Yds	Avg	Lng	TD
1975	DAL	**3**	0	**6**	**17**	**2.8**	**5**	0	**4**	**46**	**11.5**	**15**	0
		3	0	6	17	2.8	5	0	4	46	11.5	15	0
