= 1975 Dallas Cowboys season =

NFL team season

- Owner: Clint Murchison, Jr.
- General manager: Tex Schramm
- Head coach: Tom Landry
- Home stadium: Texas Stadium

Results
- Record: 10–4
- Division place: 2nd NFC East
- Playoffs: Won Divisional Playoffs (at Vikings) 17–14; Won NFC Championship (at Rams) 37–7; Lost Super Bowl X (vs. Steelers) 17–21

The 1975 Dallas Cowboys season was the team's sixteenth season in the National Football League (NFL), all under head coach Tom Landry. The Cowboys finished second in the National Football Conference (NFC) East division with a 10–4 regular season record and advanced through the playoffs to Super Bowl X, where they were defeated by the Pittsburgh Steelers 21–17. They were also the first wild card team to reach the Super Bowl.

For the first time in a decade, the Cowboys did not play on Thanksgiving, replaced by the St. Louis Cardinals.

== Offseason ==
The Cowboys were coming off a disappointing 1974 season, after finishing with a record of 8–6, effectively ending an eight-year run of making the playoffs. Accompanied with the retirement or loss of key players like Bob Lilly, Bob Hayes, Cornell Green, Walt Garrison, Dave Manders, John Niland, and Calvin Hill, there was speculation in the media that the franchise was in decline.

For all of the accolades that the Cowboys' scouting department had received throughout the years, the team had never kept more than nine draft choices and the average number was keeping six. Their 1975 NFL draft is considered to be one of the best in league history because twelve picks made the roster, hence the nickname "The Dirty Dozen". This rookie class, didn't even include linebacker Mike Hegman, who was drafted that year but did not enter the NFL until 1976. Neither was included rookie undrafted free agent quarterback Jim Zorn who made the team, but was later cut to make room for running back Preston Pearson, who had been waived by the Pittsburgh Steelers.

== NFL draft ==
1975 Dallas Cowboys draft
Round	Pick	Player	Position	College	Notes
1	2	Randy White * ^{†}	DT	Maryland	from N. Y. Giants
1	18	Thomas Henderson	LB	Langston	
2	44	Burton Lawless	OG	Florida	
3	70	Bob Breunig *	LB	Arizona State	
4	90	Pat Donovan *	DE	Stanford	
4	96	Randy Hughes	S	Oklahoma	
5	113	Kyle Davis	C	Oklahoma	
6	148	Rolly Woolsey	DB	Boise State	
7	173	Mike Hegman	LB	Tennessee State	
8	200	Mitch Hoopes	P	Arizona	
9	226	Ed Jones	DB	Rutgers	
10	252	Dennis Booker	RB	Millersville	
11	278	Greg Krpalek	C	Oregon State	
12	304	Charles Bland	DB	Cincinnati	
13	330	Herbert Scott *	OG	Virginia Union	
14	356	Scott Laidlaw	RB	Stanford	
15	382	Willie Hamilton	RB	Arizona	
16	407	Pete Clark	TE	Colorado State	
17	434	Jim Testerman	TE	Dayton	
Made roster † Pro Football Hall of Fame * Made at least one Pro Bowl during career

=== Undrafted free agents ===
1975 undrafted free agents of note
Player	Position	College
Scott Hewitt	Linebacker	North Dakota
Percy Howard	Wide Receiver	Austin Peay State
David Purdy	Quarterback	Ohio State
Jesse Ratliff	Defensive back	Cincinnati
George Thomasek	Tackle	Columbia
Warren Trahan	Defensive tackle	Texas A&M
Charles Turner	Wide receiver	Clark College
Jerry Warren	Wide receiver	Lewis & Clark
Jim Zorn	Quarterback	Cal Poly Pomona

== Roster ==
Dallas Cowboys 1975 roster
Quarterbacks: 19 Clint Longley; 12 Roger Staubach; Running backs: 21 Doug Dennison; 44 Robert Newhouse; 26 Preston Pearson; 30 Charley Young; Wide receivers: 81 Percy Howard; 88 Drew Pearson; 83 Golden Richards; Tight ends: 89 Billy Joe DuPree; 84 Jean Fugett; 87 Ron Howard	Offensive linemen: 57 Kyle Davis C; 67 Pat Donovan T; 62 John Fitzgerald C; 66 Burton Lawless G; 73 Ralph Neely T; 61 Blaine Nye G; 68 Herbert Scott G; 78 Bruce Walton T/G; 70 Rayfield Wright T; Defensive linemen: 63 Larry Cole DT; 77 Bill Gregory DT; 72 Ed Jones DE; 79 Harvey Martin DE; 75 Jethro Pugh DT; 54 Randy White DE	Linebackers: 53 Bob Breunig MLB; 59 Warren Capone MLB; 52 Dave Edwards OLB; 56 Thomas Henderson OLB; 55 Lee Roy Jordan MLB; 50 D. D. Lewis OLB; 58 Cal Peterson OLB; Defensive backs: 31 Benny Barnes CB; 43 Cliff Harris FS; 42 Randy Hughes FS; 20 Mel Renfro CB; 46 Mark Washington CB; 41 Charlie Waters SS; 45 Rolly Woolsey CB; Special teams: 15 Toni Fritsch K; 9 Mitch Hoopes P	Reserve lists: 1 Efrén Herrera K (IR); 35 Scott Laidlaw FB (IR); Rookies in italics 43 active, 2 inactive

== Regular season ==
=== Schedule ===
Week	Date	Opponent	Result	Record	Game Site	Attendance	Recap
1	September 21	Los Angeles Rams	**W** 18–7	1–0	Texas Stadium	49,091	Recap
2	September 28	**St. Louis Cardinals**	**W** 37–31 (OT)	2–0	Texas Stadium	52,417	Recap
3	October 6	at Detroit Lions	**W** 36–10	3–0	Pontiac Metropolitan Stadium	79,384	Recap
4	October 12	at **New York Giants**	**W** 13–7	4–0	Shea Stadium	56,511	Recap
5	October 19	Green Bay Packers	**L** 17–19	4–1	Texas Stadium	64,189	Recap
6	October 26	at **Philadelphia Eagles**	**W** 20–17	5–1	Veterans Stadium	64,889	Recap
7	November 2	at **Washington Redskins**	**L** 24–30 (OT)	5–2	RFK Stadium	55,004	Recap
8	November 10	Kansas City Chiefs	**L** 31–34	5–3	Texas Stadium	63,539	Recap
9	November 16	at New England Patriots	**W** 34–31	6–3	Schaefer Stadium	60,905	Recap
10	November 23	**Philadelphia Eagles**	**W** 27–17	7–3	Texas Stadium	57,893	Recap
11	November 30	**New York Giants**	**W** 14–3	8–3	Texas Stadium	53,329	Recap
12	December 7	at **St. Louis Cardinals**	**L** 17–31	8–4	Busch Memorial Stadium	49,701	Recap
13	December 13	**Washington Redskins**	**W** 31–10	9–4	Texas Stadium	61,091	Recap
14	December 21	at New York Jets	**W** 31–21	10–4	Shea Stadium	37,279	Recap

Division opponents are in bold text

=== Playoffs ===
Round	Date	Opponent	Result	Game Site	Attendance	Recap
Divisional	December 28, 1975	at Minnesota Vikings	**W** 17–14	Metropolitan Stadium	46,425	Recap
NFC Championship	January 4, 1976	at Los Angeles Rams	**W** 37–7	Los Angeles Memorial Coliseum	84,483	Recap
Super Bowl	January 18, 1976	vs Pittsburgh Steelers	**L** 17–21	Orange Bowl	80,187	Recap

=== Standings ===
NFC East
	W	L	T	PCT	DIV	CONF	PF	PA	STK
^{(3)} St. Louis Cardinals	11	3	0	.786	6–2	9–2	356	276	W3
^{(4)} Dallas Cowboys	10	4	0	.714	6–2	8–3	350	268	W2
Washington Redskins	8	6	0	.571	4–4	7–4	325	276	L2
New York Giants	5	9	0	.357	1–7	3–8	216	306	W2
Philadelphia Eagles	4	10	0	.286	3–5	4–7	225	302	W1

== Game summaries ==
=== Week 1 ===
Week One: Los Angeles Rams (0-0) at Dallas Cowboys (0-0)

Quarter	1	2	3	4	Total
Rams	0	0	0	7	7
Cowboys	0	9	3	6	18

at Texas Stadium, Irving, Texas

- Date: September 21
- Game time: 3:00 p.m.
- Game weather: 68 °F (20 °C), wind 12 mph (19 km/h), relative humidity 54%
- Referee: Pat Haggerty
- Pro-Football-Reference.com

Game information

First quarter Second quarter

- DAL - Toni Fritsch 25-yard field goal - Cowboys 3-0
- DAL - Doug Dennison 1-yard run (kick no good) - Cowboys 9-0

Third quarter

- DAL - Toni Fritsch 39-yard field goal - Cowboys 12-0

Fourth quarter

- DAL - Toni Fritsch 19-yard field goal - Cowboys 15-0
- DAL - Toni Fritsch 31-yard field goal - Cowboys 18-0
- LA - Ron Jaworski 4-yard run (Tom Dempsey kick) - Cowboys 18-7

Cowboys

- Roger Staubach - 10/23, 106 Yards, 7 Rush, 56 Yds
- Robert Newhouse - 0/1, 0 Yards, 22 Rush, 88 Yds, 3 Rec, 19 Yds
- Doug Dennison - 17 Rush, 37 Yds, TD
- Mitch Hoopes - 1 Rush, 13 Yds
- Golden Richards - 1 Rush, 3 Yds
- Scott Laidlaw - 1 Rush, 0 Yds, 2 Rec, 31 Yds
- Drew Pearson - 2 Rec, 27 Yds
- Jean Fugett - 2 Rec, 25 Yds
- Billy Joe Dupree - 1 Rec, 4 Yds
- Mel Renfro - 2 INT
- Lee Roy Jordan - 1 INT

=== Week 2 ===
Week Two: St. Louis Cardinals (1-0) at Dallas Cowboys (1-0)

Quarter	1	2	3	4	OT	Total
Cardinals	0	3	14	14	0	31
Cowboys	0	7	21	3	6	37

at Texas Stadium, Irving, Texas

- Date: September 28
- Game time: 1:00 p.m.
- Game weather: 73 °F (23 °C), wind 13 mph (21 km/h), relative humidity 53%
- Referee: Bernie Ulman
- Pro-Football-Reference.com

Game information
First quarter

Second quarter

- STL - Jim Bakken 28-yard field goal - Cardinals 3-0
- DAL - Jean Fugett 1-yard pass from Roger Staubach (Toni Fritsch kick) - Cowboys 7-3

Third quarter

- DAL - Drew Pearson 12-yard pass from Roger Staubach (Toni Fritsch kick) - Cowboys 14-3
- STL - Mel Gray 23-yard pass from Jim Hart (Jim Bakken kick) - Cowboys 14-10
- DAL - Charley Young 1-yard run (Toni Fritsch kick) - Cowboys 21-10
- STL - Earl Thomas 80-yard pass from Jim Hart (Jim Bakken kick) - Cowboys 21-17
- DAL - Thomas Henderson 97-yard kickoff return (Toni Fritsch kick) - Cowboys 28-17

Fourth quarter

- DAL - Toni Fritsch 40-yard field goal - Cowboys 31-17
- STL - Jackie Smith 35-yard pass from Jim Hart (Jim Bakken kick) - Cowboys 31-24
- STL - Mel Gray 37-yard pass from Jim Hart (Jim Bakken kick) - Tie 31-31

Overtime

- DAL - Billy Joe DuPree 3-yard pass from Roger Staubach - Cowboys 37-31

=== NFC Divisional Playoff ===
Dallas Cowboys 17, Minnesota Vikings 14

Quarter	1	2	3	4	Total
Cowboys	0	0	7	10	17
Vikings	0	7	0	7	14

at Metropolitan Stadium, Bloomington, Minnesota

- Date: December 28
- Game time: 1:00 p.m.
- Game weather: 25 °F (−4 °C), wind 8 mph (13 km/h), wind chill 17 °F (−8 °C), relative humidity 76%
- Referee: Chuck Heberling
- TV announcers (CBS): Gary Bender, Johnny Unitas
- Pro-Football-Reference.com

Game information
First quarter

Second quarter

- MIN - Chuck Foreman 1-yard run (Fred Cox kick) - Vikings 7-0

Third quarter

- DAL - Doug Dennison 4-yard run (Toni Fritsch kick) - Tie 7-7

Fourth quarter

- DAL - Toni Fritsch 24-yard field goal - Cowboys 10-7
- MIN - Brent McClanahan 1-yard run (Fred Cox kick) - Vikings 14-10
- DAL - Drew Pearson 50-yard pass from Roger Staubach (Toni Fritsch kick) - Cowboys 17-14

The "Hail Mary" Game

=== NFC Championship Game ===
Dallas Cowboys 37, Los Angeles Rams 7

Quarter	1	2	3	4	Total
Cowboys	7	14	13	3	37
Rams	0	0	0	7	7

at Los Angeles Memorial Coliseum, Los Angeles, California

- Date: January 4
- Game time: 4:00 p.m. EST
- Game weather: 51 °F (11 °C), wind 8 mph (13 km/h), relative humidity 58%
- Referee: Tommy Bell
- TV announcers (CBS): Vin Scully, Sonny Jurgensen
- Pro-Football-Reference.com

Game information
First quarter
- DAL - Preston Pearson 18-yard pass from Roger Staubach (Toni Fritsch kick) - Cowboys 7-0

Second quarter

- DAL - Golden Richards 4-yard pass from Roger Staubach (Toni Fritsch kick) - Cowboys 14-0
- DAL - Preston Pearson 15-yard pass from Roger Staubach (Toni Fritsch kick) - Cowboys 21-0

Third quarter

- DAL - Preston Pearson 19-yard pass from Roger Staubach (Toni Fritsch kick) - Cowboys 28-0
- DAL - Toni Fritsch 40-yard field goal - Cowboys 31-0
- DAL - Toni Fritsch 26-yard field goal - Cowboys 34-0

Fourth quarter

- LA - John Cappelletti 1-yard run (Tom Dempsey kick) - Cowboys 34-7
- DAL - Toni Fritsch 26-yard field goal - Cowboys 37-7

Quarterback Roger Staubach threw for 220 yards and 4 touchdown passes while also rushing for 54 yards as the Cowboys upset the favored Rams.

=== Super Bowl X ===
Super Bowl X

Quarter	1	2	3	4	Total
Cowboys (NFC)	7	3	0	7	17
Steelers (AFC)	7	0	0	14	21

at Orange Bowl, Miami, Florida

- Date: January 18, 1976
- Game attendance: 80,187
- Referee: Norm Schachter
- TV announcers (CBS): Pat Summerall, Tom Brookshier and Hank Stram

== Season recap ==
The infusion of new talent not only provided an immediate rebuilding process, but also changed the course of the team in a significant way. This group helped the team reach Super Bowl X that season, and would play a key role in the Cowboys being given the name "America's Team".

The NFL didn't start recognizing quarterback sacks as an official stat until 1982; however, the Cowboys have their own records and according to their stats, Roger Staubach got sacked a league high 45 times the previous season and 43 the year before that, to revert this trend Tom Landry revived the Shotgun formation which he called "the spread", providing the NFL with another long lasting innovation.

The Cowboys experienced an unexpected success, winning the first 4 games on the way to a 10–4 regular season record. However, home losses to the 4–10 Green Bay Packers and 5–9 Kansas City Chiefs cost the Cowboys the NFC East championship. Had Dallas defeated both Green Bay and Kansas City, it would have held home-field advantage in the playoffs thanks to an 18–7 victory over the Rams in the season opener. On the other hand, the Cowboys made home field advantage moot with their playoff wins at Minnesota and Los Angeles.

The new look offense averaged 25 points per game and a revitalized defense that became known as "Doomsday II" gave up only 19 points per game.

They made the playoffs as a wild-card team and beat the Minnesota Vikings 17-14 during the first round, in the now famous “Hail Mary” game. They then defeated the heavily favored Los Angeles Rams 37–7 on the road, winning the NFC Championship Game and becoming the first non-division winner to advance to the Super Bowl in league history. The storybook season ended in Super Bowl X after losing 21–17 to the Pittsburgh Steelers.

== Publications ==
The Football Encyclopedia ISBN 0-312-11435-4
Total Football ISBN 0-06-270170-3
Cowboys Have Always Been My Heroes ISBN 0-446-51950-2
