= 1975 Pittsburgh Steelers season =

Pittsburgh Steelers 43rd US football season

- Owner: Art Rooney
- General manager: Daniel M. Rooney
- Head coach: Chuck Noll
- Home stadium: Three Rivers Stadium

Results
- Record: 12–2
- Division place: 1st AFC Central
- Playoffs: Won Divisional Playoffs (vs. Colts) 28–10; Won AFC Championship (vs. Raiders) 16–10; Won Super Bowl X (vs. Cowboys) 21–17
- All-Pros: 7: Mel Blount (1st team); L. C. Greenwood (1st team); Jack Ham (1st team); Franco Harris (2nd team); Joe Greene (2nd team); Jack Lambert (2nd team); Lynn Swann (2nd team)
- Pro Bowlers: 11: CB Mel Blount; QB Terry Bradshaw; S Glen Edwards; DT Joe Greene; DE L. C. Greenwood; LB Jack Ham; RB Franco Harris; LB Jack Lambert; LB Andy Russell; WR Lynn Swann; S Mike Wagner
- Team MVP: Mel Blount
- Team ROY: John Banaszak

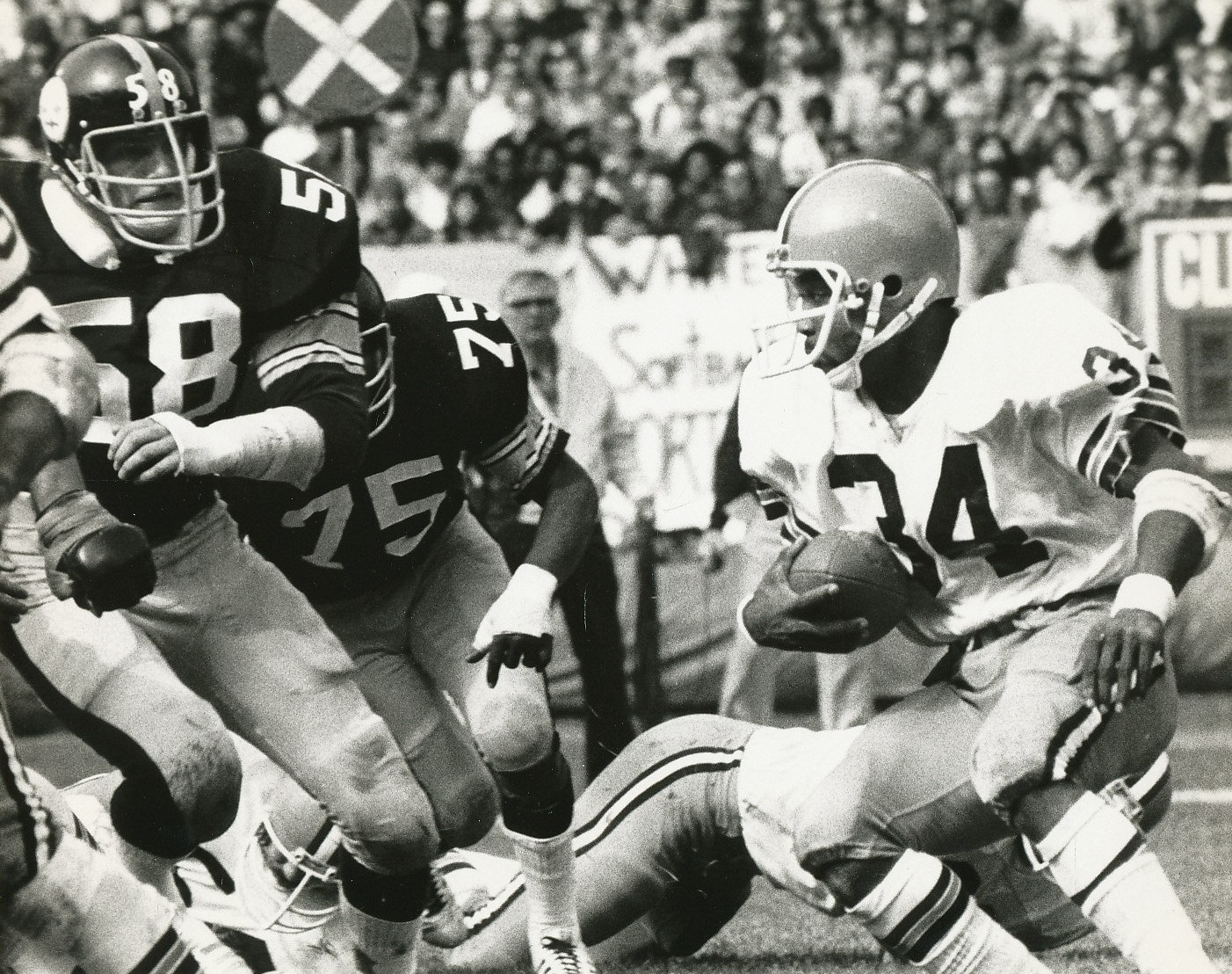
Pittsburgh Steelers linebacker Jack Lambert pursues Cleveland Browns running back Greg Pruitt in a 1975 game between the teams.

The 1975 Pittsburgh Steelers season was the franchise's 43rd in the National Football League (NFL). The Steelers were defending champions for the first time in their forty-year history and repeated as league champions. The team was led by a dominating defense and a quick offense, and won Super Bowl X over the Dallas Cowboys, 21–17. The 1975 Steelers had one of the greatest defensive teams of all time. The team posted their best defensive numbers since 1946, and scored more points than any other Steelers team, later surpassed by two points in 2010.

In 2007, the 1975 Steelers were ranked as the seventh greatest Super Bowl champions on the NFL Network's documentary series America's Game: The Super Bowl Champions, with team commentary from Lynn Swann, Dwight White, and Mike Wagner, and narrated by Bruce Willis. More than a decade later, the team ranked #10 on the 100 greatest teams of all time presented by the NFL on its 100th anniversary. The 1975 Steelers' +211 point differential stands as the best in franchise history. They won by at least 21 points six times, with their season superlative 37–0 shutout at San Diego in the opener on September 21.

== Offseason ==
=== NFL draft ===
1975 Pittsburgh Steelers draft
Round	Pick	Player	Position	College	Notes
1	26	Dave Brown *	CB	Michigan	played one season for Steelers; selected by the Seattle Seahawks in the expansion draft
2	51	Bob Barber	DE	Grambling	traded to Green Bay Packers, played 1976–1979
3	78	Walter White	TE	Maryland	traded to Kansas City Chiefs, played 1975–1979
4	104	Harold Evans	LB	Houston	
5	130	Brent Sexton	DB	Elon	
6	156	Marvin Crenshaw	T	Nebraska	
7	180	Wayne Mattingly	T	Colorado	
8	208	Al Humphrey	DE	Tulsa	
9	234	Bruce Reimer	RB	North Dakota State	
10	260	Archie Grey	WR	Wyoming	
11	286	Randy Little	TE	West Liberty	
12	312	Greg Murphy	DE	Penn State	
13	337	Bob Gaddis	WR	Mississippi Valley State	played mostly in CFL
14	364	Mike Collier	RB	Morgan State	played one season for Steelers
15	390	Marty Smith	DT	Louisville	
16	415	Miller Bassler	TE	Houston	
17	442	Stan Hegener	G	Nebraska	

=== Undrafted free agents ===
1975 undrafted free agents of note
Player	Position	College
Burce Berry	Running back	Macalester
Archie Gary	Wide receiver	Wyoming
Jeff Hollenbach	Quarterback	Illinois
Brian Masella	Kicker	Penn State
Geoffrey Steger	Defensive back	Michigan
John Segrti	Guard	Utah State

== Personnel ==
=== Staff ===
1975 Pittsburgh Steelers staff
Front office: Chairman of the board – Arthur J. Rooney; President – Daniel M. Rooney; Vice president – John R. McGinley; Vice president – Arthur J. Rooney, Jr.; Public relations director – Ed Kiely; Traveling secretary – James A. Boston; Publicity director – Joe Gordon; Controller – Robert P. Quinn; Accountant – Dennis P. Thimons; Ticket manager – Joseph H. Carr; Director of player personnel – Dick Haley; Assistant director of player personnel – Bill Nunn; Director of professional scouting – V. Timothy Rooney; Head coaches: Head coach – Chuck Noll; Offensive coaches: Offensive backfield – Dick Hoak; Offensive line – Dan Radakovich; Receivers – Lionel Taylor	Defensive coaches: Defensive coordinator – Bud Carson; Defensive line – George Perles; Linebackers – Woody Widenhofer; Strength and conditioning: Strength – Louis Riecke; Flexibility – Paul Uram; Team physician, orthopedic – John Best; Team physician – David S. Huber; Team dentist – George P. Boucek; Trainer – Ralph Berlin; Assistant trainer – Robert Milie; Equipment manager – Anthony Parisi; Field manager – Jack Hart; Film director – Bob McCartney; Photographer – Harry Homa

=== Roster ===
1975 Pittsburgh Steelers roster
Quarterbacks (QB): 12 Terry Bradshaw; 17 Joe Gilliam; 5 Terry Hanratty; Running backs (RB): 20 Rocky Bleier; 44 Mike Collier; 33 John Fuqua; 32 Franco Harris; 46 Reggie Harrison; Wide receivers (WR): 86 Reggie Garrett; 43 Frank Lewis; 82 John Stallworth; 88 Lynn Swann; Tight ends (TE): 87 Larry Brown; 84 Randy Grossman	Offensive linemen (OL): 50 Jim Clack G; 57 Sam Davis G; 71 Gordon Gravelle T; 55 Jon Kolb T; 56 Ray Mansfield C; 72 Gerry Mullins G; 74 Dave Reavis T; 52 Mike Webster C; Defensive linemen (DL): 76 John Banaszak DE; 64 Steve Furness DT; 75 Joe Greene DT; 68 L. C. Greenwood DE; 63 Ernie Holmes DT; 78 Dwight White DE	Linebackers (LB): 38 Ed Bradley MLB; 59 Jack Ham OLB; 54 Marv Kellum OLB; 58 Jack Lambert MLB; 34 Andy Russell OLB; 51 Loren Toews OLB; Defensive backs (DB): 45 Jimmy Allen CB; 47 Mel Blount CB; 36 Dave Brown CB; 27 Glen Edwards FS; 31 Donnie Shell SS; 26 J. T. Thomas CB; 23 Mike Wagner SS; Special teams (ST): 10 Roy Gerela K; 39 Bobby Walden P	Reserve: –– Bob Gaddis WR (IR); -- Brent Sexton CB (IR); Rookies in italics 43 active, 2 reserve

== Preseason ==
During the preseason, the Steelers acquired undrafted free-agent, John Banaszak. The defensive tackle from Eastern Michigan played in three games and later became the 1975 Team ROY (Rookie of the Year).

=== Schedule ===
Week	Date	Opponent	Result	Venue
1	August 1	College All-Stars	W 21–14	Soldier Field
2	August 9	Philadelphia Eagles	L 14–17	Three Rivers Stadium
3	August 17	at Oakland Raiders	L 21–24	Memorial Stadium
4	August 22	at Baltimore Colts	W 31–10	Memorial Stadium
5	August 30	New York Giants	L 7–24	Palmer Stadium
6	September 6	New Orleans Saints	W 24–13	Three Rivers Stadium
7	September 13	at Dallas Cowboys	L 16–17	Texas Stadium

== Regular season ==
=== Schedule ===
Week	Date	Opponent	Result	Venue
1	September 21	at San Diego Chargers	W 37–0	San Diego Stadium
2	September 28	Buffalo Bills	L 21–30	Three Rivers Stadium
3	October 5	at Cleveland Browns	W 42–6	Cleveland Municipal Stadium
4	October 12	Denver Broncos	W 20–9	Three Rivers Stadium
5	October 19	Chicago Bears	W 34–3	Three Rivers Stadium
6	October 26	at Green Bay Packers	W 16–13	County Stadium
7	November 2	at Cincinnati Bengals	W 30–24	Riverfront Stadium
8	November 9	Houston Oilers	W 24–17	Three Rivers Stadium
9	November 16	Kansas City Chiefs	W 28–3	Three Rivers Stadium
10	November 24	at Houston Oilers	W 32–9	Houston Astrodome
11	November 30	at New York Jets	W 20–7	Shea Stadium
12	December 7	Cleveland Browns	W 31–17	Three Rivers Stadium
13	December 13	Cincinnati Bengals	W 35–14	Three Rivers Stadium
14	December 20	at Los Angeles Rams	L 3–10	Los Angeles Memorial Coliseum

=== Game summaries ===
==== Week 1 ====
Team	1	2	3	4	Total
• Steelers	10	10	3	14	37
Chargers	0	0	0	0	0

- Date: September 21
- Location: San Diego Stadium, San Diego, California
- Game attendance: 35,853
- Referee: Gordon McCarter

Scoring summary
1	PIT	Roy Gerela 29-yard field goal	Steelers 3–0
1	PIT	Frank Lewis 40-yard pass from Terry Bradshaw (Roy Gerela kick)	Steelers 10–0
2	PIT	Gerry Mullins recovered fumble in end zone (Roy Gerela kick)	Steelers 17–0
2	PIT	Roy Gerela 25-yard field goal	Steelers 20–0
3	PIT	Roy Gerela 38-yard field goal	Steelers 23–0
4	PIT	John Stallworth 38-yard pass from Terry Bradshaw (Roy Gerela kick)	Steelers 30–0
4	PIT	Mike Collier 7-yard run (Roy Gerela kick)	Steelers 37–0

In the Week 1 game, the Steelers opened the season as defending champions, and crushed the Chargers, 37-0, in San Diego. (1-0)

==== Week 2 ====
Team	1	2	3	4	Total
• Bills	0	10	13	7	30
Steelers	0	0	7	14	21

- Date: September 28
- Location: Three Rivers Stadium, Pittsburgh, Pennsylvania
- Game attendance: 49,438
- Referee: Pat Haggerty

Scoring summary
2	BUF	John Leypoldt 37-yard field goal	Bills 3–0
2	BUF	Mike Kadish 26-yard fumble return (John Leypoldt kick)	Bills 10–0
3	BUF	Reuben Gant 7-yard pass from Joe Ferguson (John Leypoldt kick)	Bills 17–0
3	BUF	O. J. Simpson 88-yard run (kick failed)	Bills 23–0
3	PIT	Franco Harris 2-yard run (Roy Gerela kick)	Bills 23–7
4	BUF	Bob Chandler 28-yard pass from Joe Ferguson (John Leypoldt kick)	Bills 30–7
4	PIT	Randy Grossman 20-yard pass from Joe Gilliam (Roy Gerela kick)	Bills 30–14
4	PIT	Franco Harris 1-yard run (Roy Gerela kick)	Bills 30–21

In Week 2, the Steelers, coming off a crushing defeat of the Chargers in Week 1, came to play revenge eager Buffalo in Pittsburgh. The Bills had been beaten the previous year by the Steelers in the playoffs, 32-14. Chuck Noll had warned the team the previous week that the team did not play very well, however, the players ignored him and were beaten by future Hall of Fame RB O.J. Simpson, 30-21. He rushed for 227 yards, including an 88-yard touchdown run in the 3rd quarter. (1-1)

==== Week 3 ====
Team	1	2	3	4	Total
• Steelers	7	21	0	14	42
Browns	0	0	0	6	6

- Date: October 5
- Location: Cleveland Municipal Stadium, Cleveland, Ohio
- Game attendance: 73,217
- Referee: Ben Dreith

Scoring summary
1	PIT	John Stallworth 3-yard pass from Terry Bradshaw (Roy Gerela kick)	Steelers 7–0
2	PIT	Franco Harris 1-yard run (Roy Gerela kick)	Steelers 14–0
2	PIT	Mike Collier 1-yard run (Roy Gerela kick)	Steelers 21–0
2	PIT	Lynn Swann 43-yard pass from Joe Gilliam (Roy Gerela kick)	Steelers 28–0
4	CLE	McKinnis 7-yard run (kick failed)	Steelers 28–6
4	PIT	Reggie Garrett 45-yard pass from Joe Gilliam (Roy Gerela kick)	Steelers 35–6
4	PIT	Reggie Harrison 3-yard run (Roy Gerela kick)	Steelers 42–6

In this Week 3 matchup, the Steelers would be hosted by the Cleveland Browns. These two teams had already been established as one of the league's best rivalries by this time, and Joe Greene's infamous kicking of the Browns lineman Bob McKay only fueled the rivalry. The fight that broke out afterwards caught it on fire. Greene was later fined $500 while the Steelers beat the Browns, 42-6. (2-1) This was the first of eleven consecutive victories for the Steelers.

==== Week 4 ====
Team	1	2	3	4	Total
Broncos	3	6	0	0	9
• Steelers	7	10	0	3	20

- Date: October 12
- Location: Three Rivers Stadium, Pittsburgh, Pennsylvania
- Game start: 1:00 p.m., EST
- Game attendance: 49,164
- Game weather: 59 °F (15 °C) (Mostly Cloudy)
- Referee: Dick Jorgensen
- Television network: NBC

Scoring summary
1	DEN	Jim Turner 22-yard field goal	Broncos 3–0
1	PIT	Lynn Swann 43-yard pass from Terry Bradshaw (Roy Gerela kick)	Steelers 7–3
2	PIT	Lynn Swann 9-yard pass from Terry Bradshaw (Roy Gerela kick)	Steelers 14–3
2	PIT	Roy Gerela 39-yard field goal	Steelers 17–3
2	DEN	Jim Turner 39-yard field goal	Steelers 17–6
2	DEN	Jim Turner 36-yard field goal	Steelers 17–9
4	PIT	Roy Gerela 28-yard field goal	Steelers 20–9

In Week 4, the Steelers beat the Denver Broncos in Three Rivers, 20-9. (3-1)

==== Week 5 ====
Team	1	2	3	4	Total
Bears	0	3	0	0	3
• Steelers	0	10	10	14	34

- Date: October 19
- Location: Three Rivers Stadium, Pittsburgh, Pennsylvania
- Game start: 1:00 p.m., EST
- Game attendance: 47,579
- Game weather: 50 °F (10 °C) (Cloudy)
- Referee: Norm Schachter
- Television network: CBS

Scoring summary
2	CHI	Bob Thomas 32-yard field goal	Bears 3–0
2	PIT	Roy Gerela 37-yard field goal	Tie 3–3
2	PIT	Reggie Harrison 1-yard run (Roy Gerela kick)	Steelers 10–3
3	PIT	Roy Gerela 18-yard field goal	Steelers 13–3
3	PIT	Franco Harris 3-yard run (Roy Gerela kick)	Steelers 20–3
4	PIT	Rocky Bleier 3-yard run (Roy Gerela kick)	Steelers 27–3
4	PIT	Terry Bradshaw 1-yard run (Roy Gerela kick)	Steelers 34–3

In Week 5, the Steelers crushed Chicago, 34-3. Three weeks after the Steelers were beaten by Buffalo, the team was 4-1, and had allowed only 18 points during the last three weeks while scoring 96. (4-1)

==== Week 6 ====
Team	1	2	3	4	Total
• Steelers	3	10	0	3	16
Packers	0	6	7	0	13

- Date: October 26
- Location: Milwaukee County Stadium, Milwaukee, Wisconsin
- Game start: 2:00 p.m. EST
- Game attendance: 52,258
- Game weather: 44 °F (7 °C), Wind 12 mph (19 km/h)
- Referee: Fred Silva
- Television network: NBC

Scoring summary
1	PIT	Roy Gerela 19-yard field goal	Steelers 3–0
2	GB	John Brockington 2-yard run (kick blocked)	Packers 6–3
2	PIT	Mike Collier 94-yard kickoff return (Roy Gerela kick)	Steelers 10–6
2	PIT	Roy Gerela 19-yard field goal	Steelers 13–6
3	GB	John Brockington 5-yard run (Joe Danelo kick)	Tie 13–13
4	PIT	Roy Gerela 29-yard field goal	Steelers 16–13

In Week 5, the Packers would host the Steelers in Milwaukee, however, the tense battle ended in Pittsburgh's favor, 16-13. (5-1)

==== Week 7 ====
Team	1	2	3	4	Total
• Steelers	0	10	13	7	30
Bengals	3	0	0	21	24

- Date: November 2
- Location: Riverfront Stadium, Cincinnati, Ohio
- Game attendance: 58,418
- Referee: Tommy Bell

Scoring summary
1	CIN	Dave Green 23-yard field goal	Bengals 3–0
2	PIT	Roy Gerela 42-yard field goal	Tie 3–3
2	PIT	Lynn Swann 37-yard pass from Terry Bradshaw (Roy Gerela kick)	Steelers 10–3
3	PIT	Rocky Bleier 3-yard run (Roy Gerela kick)	Steelers 17–3
3	PIT	Lynn Swann 25-yard pass from Terry Bradshaw (kick failed)	Steelers 23–3
4	CIN	Charlie Joiner 34-yard pass from Ken Anderson (Dave Green kick)	Steelers 23–10
4	CIN	Essex Johnson 3-yard pass from Ken Anderson (Dave Green kick)	Steelers 23–17
4	PIT	Terry Bradshaw 1-yard run (Roy Gerela kick)	Steelers 30–17
4	CIN	Chip Myers 22-yard pass from Ken Anderson (Dave Green kick)	Steelers 30–24

In Week 7, the Steelers played the Bengals in Riverfront Stadium and won the game, 30–24. (6–1)

==== Week 8 ====
Team	1	2	3	4	Total
Oilers	0	7	3	7	17
• Steelers	10	7	0	7	24

- Date: November 9
- Location: Three Rivers Stadium, Pittsburgh, Pennsylvania
- Game start: 1:00 p.m., EST
- Game attendance: 49,460
- Game weather: 75 °F (24 °C) (Sunny)
- Referee: Jim Tunney
- Television network: NBC

Scoring summary
1	PIT	Roy Gerela 22-yard field goal	Steelers 3–0
1	PIT	Lynn Swann 8-yard pass from Terry Bradshaw (Roy Gerela kick)	Steelers 10–0
2	HOU	Ronnie Coleman 3-yard run (Skip Butler kick)	Steelers 10–7
2	PIT	Larry Brown 6-yard pass from Terry Bradshaw (Roy Gerela kick)	Steelers 17–7
3	HOU	Skip Butler 48-yard field goal	Steelers 17–10
4	HOU	Fred Willis 1-yard run (Skip Butler kick)	Tie 17–17
4	PIT	John Stallworth 21-yard pass from Terry Bradshaw (Roy Gerela kick)	Steelers 24–17

In this heated Week 8 battle, the Steelers would play host to the Houston Oilers. Pittsburgh sealed the win with a 4th quarter touchdown pass from #12 Terry Bradshaw to #82 John Stallworth that placed them at the top of the division. (7-1)

==== Week 9 ====
Team	1	2	3	4	Total
Chiefs	0	3	0	0	3
• Steelers	0	7	14	7	28

- Date: November 16
- Location: Three Rivers Stadium, Pittsburgh, Pennsylvania
- Game start: 1:00 p.m., EST
- Game attendance: 48,803
- Game weather: 55 °F (13 °C) (Partly Cloudy)
- Referee: Bernie Ulman
- Television network: NBC

Scoring summary
2	KC	Jan Stenerud 32-yard field goal	Chiefs 3–0
2	PIT	Lynn Swann 42-yard pass from Terry Bradshaw (Roy Gerela kick)	Steelers 7–3
3	PIT	Reggie Harrison 10-yard run (Roy Gerela kick)	Steelers 14–3
3	PIT	John Stallworth 16-yard pass from Terry Bradshaw (Roy Gerela kick)	Steelers 21–3
4	PIT	Mike Collier 21-yard run (Roy Gerela kick)	Steelers 28–3

In Week 9, the Steelers beat the Chiefs, 28-3. (8-1)

==== Week 10 ====
Team	1	2	3	4	Total
• Steelers	2	13	3	14	32
Oilers	0	3	0	6	9

- Date: Monday, November 24
- Location: Houston Astrodome, Houston, Texas
- Game start: 9:00 p.m., EST
- Game attendance: 49,947
- Game weather: Dome (indoors)
- Referee: Bob Frederic
- TV announcers (ABC): Frank Gifford, Howard Cosell, and Alex Karras

Scoring summary
1	PIT	Safety, Dan Pastorini tackled by Dwight White in end zone	Steelers 2–0
2	HOU	Skip Butler 27-yard field goal	Oilers 3–2
2	PIT	Franco Harris 4-yard run (Roy Gerela kick)	Steelers 9–3
2	PIT	Lynn Swann 18-yard pass from Terry Bradshaw (kick failed)	Steelers 15–3
3	PIT	Roy Gerela 30-yard field goal	Steelers 18–3
4	PIT	John Fuqua 13-yard run (Roy Gerela kick)	Steelers 25–3
4	HOU	Ken Burrough 59-yard pass from Dan Pastorini (kick failed)	Steelers 25–9
4	PIT	Franco Harris 13-yard run (Roy Gerela kick)	Steelers 32–9

In Week 10, the Steelers defeated the Oilers again, this time in Houston 32-9, and secured a playoff spot. (9-1)

==== Week 11 ====
Team	1	2	3	4	Total
• Steelers	0	10	10	0	20
Jets	0	0	0	7	7

- Date: November 30
- Location: Shea Stadium, Flushing, New York
- Game attendance: 52,618
- Referee: Cal Lepore

Scoring summary
2	PIT	Roy Gerela 26-yard field goal	Steelers 3–0
2	PIT	Franco Harris 44-yard pass from Terry Bradshaw (Roy Gerela kick)	Steelers 10–0
3	PIT	Frank Lewis 8-yard pass from Terry Bradshaw (Roy Gerela kick)	Steelers 17–0
3	PIT	Roy Gerela 19-yard field goal	Steelers 20–0
4	NYJ	Jerome Barkum 6-yard pass from Joe Namath (Pat Leahy kick)	Steelers 20–7

In Week 11, the Steelers beat the Jets 20-7. (10-1)

==== Week 12 ====
Team	1	2	3	4	Total
Browns	3	14	0	0	17
• Steelers	7	3	14	7	31

- Date: December 7
- Location: Three Rivers Stadium, Pittsburgh, Pennsylvania
- Game start: 1:00 p.m., EST
- Game attendance: 47,962
- Game weather: 38 °F (3 °C) (Sunny), Wind 11 mph (18 km/h)
- Referee: Pat Haggerty
- Television network: NBC

Scoring summary
1	CLE	Don Cockroft 26-yard field goal	Browns 3–0
1	PIT	Franco Harris 3-yard run (Roy Gerela kick)	Steelers 7–3
2	CLE	Greg Pruitt 1-yard run (Don Cockroft kick)	Browns 10–7
2	CLE	Willie Miller 17-yard fumble return (Don Cockroft kick)	Browns 17–7
2	PIT	Roy Gerela 32-yard field goal	Browns 17–10
3	PIT	Lynn Swann 3-yard pass from Terry Bradshaw (Roy Gerela kick)	Tie 17–17
3	PIT	Lynn Swann 18-yard pass from Terry Bradshaw (Roy Gerela kick)	Steelers 24–17
4	PIT	Franco Harris 8-yard run (Roy Gerela kick)	Steelers 31–17

In another defeat of Cleveland in Week 13, 31-17, the Steelers continued their winning streak to 10. (11-1)

==== Week 13 ====
Team	1	2	3	4	Total
Bengals	0	7	0	7	14
• Steelers	14	7	7	7	35

- Date: Saturday, December 13
- Location: Three Rivers Stadium, Pittsburgh, Pennsylvania
- Game start: 12:30 p.m., EST
- Game attendance: 48,889
- Game weather: 57 °F (14 °C), (Sunny) wind 8 mph (13 km/h)
- Referee: Ben Dreith
- Television network: NBC

Scoring summary
1	PIT	Lynn Swann 3-yard pass from Terry Bradshaw (Roy Gerela kick)	Steelers 7–0
1	PIT	J.T. Thomas 21-yard fumble return (Roy Gerela kick)	Steelers 14–0
2	CIN	Stan Fritts 1-yard run (Dave Green kick)	Steelers 14–7
2	PIT	Franco Harris 10-yard run (Roy Gerela kick)	Steelers 21–7
3	PIT	Terry Bradshaw 7-yard run (Roy Gerela kick)	Steelers 28–7
4	PIT	Franco Harris 2-yard run (Roy Gerela kick)	Steelers 35–7
4	CIN	Isaac Curtis 1-yard pass from Ken Anderson (Dave Green kick)	Steelers 35–14

In Week 13, the Steelers finished the sweep of the division by beating the Bengals again, 35-14. (12-1)

==== Week 14 ====
Team	1	2	3	4	Total
Steelers	3	0	0	0	3
• Rams	0	3	0	7	10

- Date: Saturday, December 20
- Location: Los Angeles Memorial Coliseum, Los Angeles, California
- Game start: 9:00 p.m., EST
- Game attendance: 69,389
- Game weather: 53 °F (12 °C), wind 6 mph (9.7 km/h)
- Referee: Tommy Bell
- TV announcers (ABC): Frank Gifford, Howard Cosell, and Alex Karras

Scoring summary
1	PIT	Roy Gerela 20-yard field goal	Steelers 3–0
2	LA	Tom Dempsey 26-yard field goal	Tie 3–3
4	LA	Ron Jaworski 5-yard run (Tom Dempsey kick)	Rams 10–3

In the meaningless Week 14 game, the Steelers were beaten by Los Angeles, 10-3. (12-2)

=== Standings ===
AFC Central
	W	L	T	PCT	DIV	CONF	PF	PA	STK
^{(1)} Pittsburgh Steelers	12	2	0	.857	6–0	10–1	373	162	L1
^{(4)} Cincinnati Bengals	11	3	0	.786	3–3	8–3	340	246	W1
Houston Oilers	10	4	0	.714	2–4	7–4	293	226	W3
Cleveland Browns	3	11	0	.214	1–5	2–8	218	372	L1

== Stats ==
Quarter-by-quarter

Quarter-by-quarter
	1	2	3	4	OT	T
Steelers	63	118	81	111	0	373
Opponents	9	62	23	68	0	162

== Postseason ==
=== Schedule ===
Week	Date	Opponent	Result	Venue
Divisional	December 27	Baltimore Colts	W 28–10	Three Rivers Stadium
AFC Championship	January 4	Oakland Raiders	W 16–10	Three Rivers Stadium
Super Bowl X	January 18	Dallas Cowboys	W 21–17	Miami Orange Bowl

=== Game summaries ===
==== Divisional ====
Team	1	2	3	4	Total
Colts	0	7	3	0	10
• Steelers	7	0	7	14	28

- Date: Saturday, December 27
- Location: Three Rivers Stadium, Pittsburgh, Pennsylvania
- Game start: 1:00 p.m. EST
- Game attendance: 49,557
- Game weather: 32 °F (0 °C) (Light Snow)
- Referee: Pat Haggerty
- TV announcers (NBC): Jim Simpson, John Brodie, and Don Meredith

Scoring summary
1	PIT	Franco Harris 8-yard run (Roy Gerela kick)	Steelers 7–0
2	BAL	Glenn Doughty 5-yard pass from Marty Domres (Toni Linhart kick)	Tie 7–7
3	BAL	Toni Linhart 21-yard field goal	Colts 10–7
3	PIT	Rocky Bleier 7-yard run (Roy Gerela kick)	Steelers 14–10
4	PIT	Terry Bradshaw 2-yard run (Roy Gerela kick)	Steelers 21–10
4	PIT	Andy Russell 93-yard fumble return (Roy Gerela kick)	Steelers 28–10

- Franco Harris gained 152 yds rushing, one yard less than the Baltimore Colts offense. Andy Russell set a record for longest playoff fumble return.

==== AFC Championship ====
Team	1	2	3	4	Total
Raiders	0	0	0	10	10
• Steelers	0	3	0	13	16

- Date: January 4
- Location: Three Rivers Stadium, Pittsburgh, Pennsylvania
- Game start: 1:00 p.m. EST
- Game attendance: 50,609
- Game weather: 16 °F (−9 °C) (Blowing Snow)
- Referee: Ben Dreith
- TV announcers (NBC): Curt Gowdy, Al DeRogatis, and Don Meredith

Scoring summary
2	PIT	Roy Gerela 36-yard field goal	Steelers 3–0
4	PIT	Franco Harris 25-yard run (Roy Gerela kick)	Steelers 10–0
4	OAK	Mike Siani 14-yard pass from Ken Stabler (George Blanda kick)	Steelers 10–7
4	PIT	John Stallworth 20-yard pass from Terry Bradshaw (kick failed)	Steelers 16–7
4	OAK	George Blanda 41-yard field goal	Steelers 16–10

Pittsburgh won the game, despite giving up eight turnovers.

==== Super Bowl ====
Team	1	2	3	4	Total
Cowboys	7	3	0	7	17
• Steelers	7	0	0	14	21

- Date: January 18
- Location: Orange Bowl, Miami, Florida
- Game start: 2:00 p.m. EST
- Game attendance: 80,187
- Referee: Norm Schachter
- TV announcers (CBS): Pat Summerall and Tom Brookshier

Scoring summary
1	10:24	DAL	Drew Pearson 29-yard pass from Roger Staubach (Toni Fritsch kick)	Cowboys 7–0
1	5:57	PIT	Randy Grossman 7-yard pass from Terry Bradshaw (Roy Gerela kick)	Tie 7–7
2	14:45	DAL	Toni Fritsch 36-yard field goal	Cowboys 10–7
4	11:28	PIT	Safety, Reggie Harrison blocked punt through end zone	Cowboys 10–9
4	8:41	PIT	Roy Gerela 36-yard field goal	Steelers 12–10
4	6:37	PIT	Roy Gerela 18-yard field goal	Steelers 15–10
4	3:06	PIT	Lynn Swann 64-yard pass from Terry Bradshaw (kick failed)	Steelers 21–10
4	1:48	DAL	Percy Howard 34-yard pass from Roger Staubach (Toni Fritsch kick)	Steelers 21–17

- Lynn Swann earned the MVP award catching 4 receptions for 161 yards.
- The Pittsburgh Steelers won their 2nd of their 6 Super Bowl championships.

== Awards, honors, and records ==
- Mel Blount, National Football League Defensive Player of the Year Award
- Lynn Swann, Super Bowl Most Valuable Player
