= 1975 Los Angeles Rams season =

American football team season

- Owner: Carroll Rosenbloom
- Head coach: Chuck Knox
- Home stadium: Los Angeles Memorial Coliseum

Results
- Record: 12–2
- Division place: 1st NFC West
- Playoffs: Won Divisional Playoffs (vs. Cardinals) 35–23; Lost NFC Championship (vs. Cowboys) 7–37

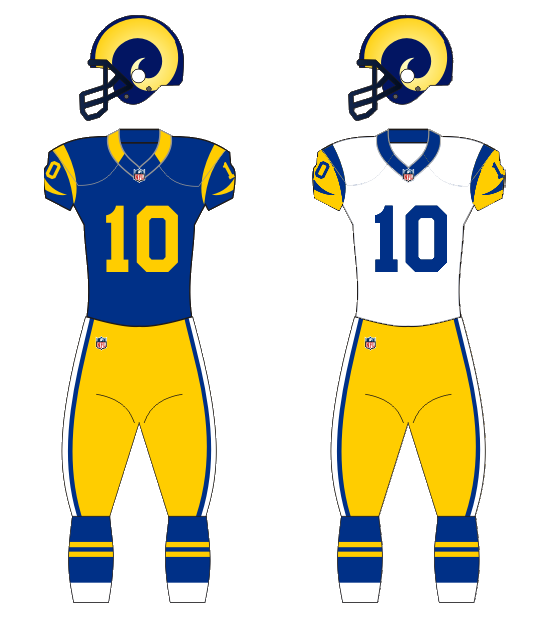
Los Angeles/St. Louis Rams uniforms from 1973 to 1999

The 1975 Los Angeles Rams season was the team's 38th year with the National Football League, and the 30th season in Los Angeles. The Rams finished the season with a 12–2 record and won the NFC West and qualified for the playoffs for the 3rd straight season. The Rams finished the season with the number 1 scoring and number 1 total defense in the NFL. In the postseason, they defeated the St. Louis Cardinals 35–23 in the divisional round before getting routed by the Dallas Cowboys 37–7 in the NFC Championship Game. The 1975 season also represents the last time the Rams played a game on Thanksgiving Day, in which they defeated the Lions 20–0. The 50-year drought without playing a game on the holiday is the longest active drought in the NFL and the longest in history, even beating out the Jacksonville Jaguars, who have never played on Thanksgiving, but they've only existed for 29 seasons.

In 2007, ESPN.com ranked the 1975 Rams as the tenth-greatest defense in NFL history. Said ESPN.com, "Fred Dryer. Jack Youngblood. Merlin Olsen. Get the idea? They weren't the "Fearsome Foursome," but with those guys anchoring the defensive line, and All-Pros Isiah Robertson (linebacker) and Dave Elmendorf (safety), the Rams were almost impossible to score against. The Rams went 12–2, holding opponents to just 9.6 points a game, (the second-lowest average in NFL history) and ending the season with a six-game winning streak during which they gave up just 32 points. The defense wasn't as impressive in the postseason, surrendering 23 points in a first-round 35–23 victory over the offensive powerhouse Cardinals before being demolished 37–7 by the Cowboys in the NFC title game."

== Offseason ==
=== NFL draft ===
1975 Los Angeles Rams draft
Round	Pick	Player	Position	College	Notes
1	9	Mike Fanning	Defensive tackle	Notre Dame	
1	11	Dennis Harrah *	Tackle	Miami	
1	20	Doug France *	Tackle	Ohio State	
2	28	Monte Jackson *	Cornerback	San Diego State	
2	48	Leroy Jones	Defensive end	Norfolk State	
3	61	Geoff Reece	Center	Washington State	
3	67	Dan Nugent	Guard	Auburn	_{Would later make Denver Broncos roster in 1976}
4	98	Rod Perry *	Defensive back	Colorado	
5	112	Wayne Hammond	Defensive tackle	Montana State	
5	126	Rick Nuzum	Center	Kentucky	
6	140	Darius McCarthy	Wide receiver	South Carolina State	
7	176	Pat Haden *	Quarterback	USC	
8	204	John Washington	Defensive back	Tulane	
9	229	Gordy Riegel	Linebacker	Stanford	
11	281	Howard Strickland	Running back	California	
12	307	Chandler Williams	Wide receiver		
13	332	A.J. Jacobs	Defensive back	Louisville	
14	360	Arthur Allen	Wide receiver	Oregon State	
15	385	Alvin White	Quarterback	Oregon State	
16	410	Francis Reynolds	Running back	Alcorn State	
17	428	Skip Boyd	Punter	Washington	
Made roster † Pro Football Hall of Fame * Made at least one Pro Bowl during career

== Personnel ==
=== Staff / Coaches ===
1975 Los Angeles Rams staff
Front Office: Owner – Carroll Rosenbloom; President / General Manager – Don Klosterman; Coaching Staff: Head coach - Chuck Knox; Offensive Coaches: Offensive Coordinator - Ken Meyer; Offensive Backfield Coach - Elijah Pitts; Offensive Line - Ray Prochaska; Receivers Coach - Leeman Bennett	Defensive Coaches: Defensive Coordinator - Ray Malavasi; Linebackers - Tom Catlin; Special Teams Coaches: None - N/A; Strength and Conditioning: None - N/A; Other Assistant Coaches: Training Assistant - Garrett Giemont; Advance Scott - Jack Faulkner

=== Roster ===
1975 Los Angeles Rams roster
Quarterbacks (QB): 12 James Harris; 16 Ron Jaworski; Running backs (RB): 45 Jim Bertelsen; 32 Cullen Bryant; 22 John Cappelletti; 30 Lawrence McCutcheon; 39 Rod Phillips; 33 Rob Scribner; Wide receivers (WR): 29 Harold Jackson; 81 Ron Jessie; 24 Willie McGee; 84 Jack Snow; Tight ends (TE): 80 Bob Klein; 83 Terry Nelson	Offensive linemen (OL): 73 Charley Cowan T; 55 Bob DeMarco C; 77 Doug France T; 60 Dennis Harrah G; 65 Tom Mack G; 61 Rich Saul C; 71 Joe Scibelli G; 75 John Williams T; Defensive linemen (DL): 70 Al Cowlings DE; 89 Fred Dryer DE; 79 Mike Fanning DT; 76 Cody Jones DT; 74 Merlin Olsen DT; 85 Jack Youngblood DE	Linebackers (LB): 36 Ken Geddes OLB; 52 Rick Kay OLB; 57 Jim Peterson OLB; 64 Jack Reynolds MLB; 58 Isiah Robertson OLB; 59 Jim Youngblood MLB; Defensive backs (DB): 42 Dave Elmendorf SS; 28 Monte Jackson CB; 41 Eddie McMillan CB; 49 Rod Perry CB; 20 Steve Preece FS; 48 Bill Simpson FS; Special teams (ST): 17 Duane Carrell P; 10 Tom Dempsey K	Reserve: 90 Larry Brooks DT (IR); 44 Al Clark CB (IR); 68 Wayne Hammond DT (IR); 77 Greg Horton G/T (IR); 67 Bill Nelson DT (IR); 62 Dan Nugent G (IR); 72 Al Oliver T (IR); 59 Geoff Reece C (IR); 47 Charlie Stukes CB (IR); Rookies in italics

== Regular season ==
=== Schedule ===
Week	Date	Opponent	Result	Record	Venue	Attendance
1	September 21	at Dallas Cowboys	**L** 7–18	0–1	Texas Stadium	49,091
2	September 28	at **San Francisco 49ers**	**W** 23–14	1–1	Candlestick Park	55,072
3	October 5	Baltimore Colts	**W** 24–13	2–1	Los Angeles Memorial Coliseum	62,491
4	October 12	at San Diego Chargers	**W** 13–10	3–1	San Diego Stadium	37,382
5	October 19	**Atlanta Falcons**	**W** 22–7	4–1	Los Angeles Memorial Coliseum	64,843
6	October 26	**New Orleans Saints**	**W** 38–14	5–1	Los Angeles Memorial Coliseum	54,723
7	November 3	at Philadelphia Eagles	**W** 42–3	6–1	Veterans Stadium	64,601
8	November 9	San Francisco 49ers	**L** 23–24	6–2	Los Angeles Memorial Coliseum	74,064
9	November 16	at **Atlanta Falcons**	**W** 16–7	7–2	Atlanta–Fulton County Stadium	44,595
10	November 23	Chicago Bears	**W** 38–10	8–2	Los Angeles Memorial Coliseum	64,979
11	November 27	at Detroit Lions	**W** 20–0	9–2	Pontiac Municipal Stadium	69,552
12	December 7	at **New Orleans Saints**	**W** 14–7	10–2	Louisiana Superdome	39,958
13	December 14	Green Bay Packers	**W** 22–5	11–2	Los Angeles Memorial Coliseum	66,496
14	December 20	Pittsburgh Steelers	**W** 10–3	12–2	Los Angeles Memorial Coliseum	69,389
Note: Intra-division opponents are in **bold** text.

=== Week 1: Dallas Cowboys ===
Quarter	1	2	3	4	Total
Rams	0	0	0	7	**7**
**Cowboys**	0	9	3	6	**18**

at Texas Stadium, Irving, TX

- Date: September 21
- Game time: 3:00
- Game weather: 68 °F (20 °C), wind 12 mph
- Referee: Pat Haggerty
- TV: CBS
- Box Score

Scoring summary

Quarter	Time	Drive			Team	Scoring information	Score	
Quarter	Time	Plays	Yards	TOP	Team	Scoring information	Rams	Cowboys
2					Cowboys	25-yard field goal by Toni Fritsch	0	3
2					Cowboys	Doug Dennison 1-yard touchdown run, kick no good	0	9
3					Cowboys	39-yard field goal by Fritsch	0	12
4					Cowboys	19-yard field goal by Fritsch	0	15
4					Cowboys	31-yard field goal by Fritsch	0	18
4					Rams	Ron Jaworski 4-yard touchdown run, Tom Dempsey kick good	7	18
"TOP" = time of possession. For other American football terms, see Glossary of American football.							7	18

=== Playoffs ===
Round	Date	Opponent (seed)	Result	Record	Venue	Attendance
Divisional	December 27	St. Louis Cardinals (3)	**W** 35–23	1–0	Los Angeles Memorial Coliseum	72,650
NFC Championship	January 4, 1976	Dallas Cowboys (4)	**L** 7–37	1–1	Los Angeles Memorial Coliseum	84,483

==== NFC Divisional Playoff ====
St. Louis Cardinals vs. Los Angeles Rams – Game summary

Quarter	1	2	3	4	Total
Cardinals	0	9	7	7	**23**
**Rams**	14	14	0	7	**35**

at Los Angeles Memorial Coliseum, Los Angeles

- Game time: 4:00 p.m. EST/1:00 p.m. PST
- Game attendance: 73,459
- Referee: Dick Jorgensen
- TV announcers (CBS): Frank Glieber and Hank Stram

Game information
- **Scoring**
  - LA – Jaworski 5 run (Dempsey kick) LA 7–0
  - LA – Youngblood 47 interception return (Dempsey kick) LA 14–0
  - LA – Simpson 65 interception return (Dempsey kick) LA 21–0
  - STL – Otis 3 run (kick blocked) LA 21–6
  - LA – Jackson 66 pass from Jaworski (Dempsey kick) LA 28–6
  - STL – field goal Bakken 39 LA 28–9
  - STL – Gray 11 pass from Hart (Bakken kick) LA 28–16
  - LA – Jessie 2 fumble return (Dempsey kick) LA 35–16
  - STL – Jones 3 run (Bakken kick) LA 35–23

=== NFC Championship Game ===
Dallas Cowboys 37, Los Angeles Rams 7

Quarter	1	2	3	4	Total
**Cowboys**	7	14	13	3	**37**
Rams	0	0	0	7	**7**

at Los Angeles Memorial Coliseum, Los Angeles, California

- Date: January 4
- Game time: 4:00 p.m. EST
- Game weather: 51 °F (11 °C), wind 8 mph, relative humidity 58%
- Referee: Tommy Bell
- TV announcers (CBS): Vin Scully and Sonny Jurgensen
- Pro-Football-Reference.com

Game information
**First quarter**
- DAL - Preston Pearson 18-yard pass from Roger Staubach (Toni Fritsch kick) - **Cowboys 7-0**

**Second quarter**

- DAL - Golden Richards 4-yard pass from Roger Staubach (Toni Fritsch kick) - **Cowboys 14-0**
- DAL - Preston Pearson 15-yard pass from Roger Staubach (Toni Fritsch kick) - **Cowboys 21-0**

**Third quarter**

- DAL - Preston Pearson 19-yard pass from Roger Staubach (Toni Fritsch kick) - **Cowboys 28-0**
- DAL - Toni Fritsch 40-yard field goal - **Cowboys 31-0**
- DAL - Toni Fritsch 26-yard field goal - **Cowboys 34-0**

**Fourth quarter**

- LA - John Cappelletti 1-yard run (Tom Dempsey kick) - **Cowboys 34-7**
- DAL - Toni Fritsch 26-yard field goal - **Cowboys 37-7**

=== Standings ===
NFC West
	W	L	T	PCT	DIV	CONF	PF	PA	STK
Los Angeles Rams^{(2)}	12	2	0	.857	5–1	9–2	312	135	W6
San Francisco 49ers	5	9	0	.357	3–3	4–7	255	286	L4
Atlanta Falcons	4	10	0	.286	3–3	3–8	240	289	L1
New Orleans Saints	2	12	0	.143	1–5	2–9	165	360	L7
