= Doug Dennison =

American gridiron football player (born 1951)

No. 21
- Position: Running back

Personal information
- Born: December 18, 1951 (age 74); Lancaster, Pennsylvania, U.S.
- Listed height: 6 ft 1 in (1.85 m)
- Listed weight: 202 lb (92 kg)

Career information
- High school: J. P. McCaskey (Lancaster)
- College: Kutztown
- NFL draft: 1974: undrafted

Career history
- Dallas Cowboys (1974–1978); Cleveland Browns (1979); Toronto Argonauts (1980); Chicago Blitz (1983); Arizona Wranglers (1984)

Awards and highlights
- Super Bowl champion (XII); Second-team All-PSAC (1973); Honorable-mention AP All-State Collegiate Team (1973)

Career NFL statistics
- Games played: 52
- Rushing yards: 1,112
- Rushing attempts: 306
- Rushing touchdowns: 19
- Receiving yards: 110
- Stats at Pro Football Reference

William Douglas Dennison (born December 18, 1951) is an American former professional football player who was a running back in the National Football League (NFL) for the Dallas Cowboys and Cleveland Browns. He also was a member of the Chicago Blitz and Arizona Wranglers of the United States Football League (USFL). He played college football for the Kutztown Golden Bears.

== Early life ==
Dennison attended J.P. McCaskey High School, where he was a district triple jump champion and finished sixth in the state finals. He played only 2 years of football.

He accepted a track scholarship from Kutztown State College, where he set school records in the triple jump with 47 feet and the long jump with 23 feet.

As a junior in 1972, he began playing football as a two-way starter at safety and running back. As a senior in 1973, he was leading the division in rushing, when he suffered a left knee injury in the fifth game of the season and was lost for the year. He received second-team All-PSAC honors, after finishing the year with 587 rushing yards on 149 carries and 13 receptions for 128 yards.

In 1978, he was inducted into the Kutztown Athletic Hall of Fame.

== Professional career ==
=== Dallas Cowboys ===
Dennison was signed as an undrafted free agent by the Dallas Cowboys after the 1974 NFL draft, after not being selected because of his college knee injury. The NFL players held a strike from July until August, which helped him get an extended look in training camp and eventually become the first NFL player from Kutztown State. As a rookie, he was a contributor in special teams and established himself as the team's short-yardage specialist, registering 4 touchdowns.

In 1975, when Calvin Hill left to join the WFL, he was used in combination with Preston Pearson and Charley Young. He started his first three games, finishing the season with 383 rushing yards (third on the team) and 7 rushing touchdowns (led the team).

Head coach Tom Landry once said: "Doug Dennison is the best guy I know to give a football to on the goal line or short yardage," "if you want to make it, you give it to Doug. Dennison is going to give you everything he's got." and "Doug Dennison is a warrior", "If you had to go to war, you'd want to go with Doug Dennison".

In 1976, he was named the starter after Pearson missed most of the season with an injury, leading the team in rushing (542 yards) and also scoring 6 touchdowns. He started 10 out of 14 games, alternating later at running back when Pearson returned.

In 1977, he was relegated to playing mostly on special teams with the arrival of Tony Dorsett. In 1978, he was placed on the injured reserve list, after suffering a left knee injury while playing special teams in the sixth game against the New York Giants.

On August 21, 1979, he was waived to make room for Ron Springs. He finished his Cowboys career with 19 touchdowns on 309 carries and 1,112 rushing yards.

=== Cleveland Browns ===
The Cleveland Browns signed him on October 13, 1979, to replace Greg Pruitt, who was lost for the season with an injured knee. At the end of his one-year contract, the Browns didn't re-sign him after drafting Charles White.

=== Toronto Argonauts (CFL) ===
On March 21, 1980, he signed with the Toronto Argonauts. After injuring his left knee on the first day of camp, he announced his retirement. He later changed his mind and rejoined the team in August, but was waived on September 11, 1980.

=== Chicago Blitz (USFL) ===
After being out of football for three years, head coach George Allen signed him to the Chicago Blitz in 1983, to provide depth behind Tim Spencer. He finished the season with 134 rushing yards on 42 carries and 15 receptions for 166 yards and one touchdown.

=== Arizona Wranglers (USFL) ===
In 1984, the Chicago Blitz and the Arizona Wranglers engineered a swap of assets in which Allen, the Blitz coaching staff and most of the Blitz players moved to Phoenix, while most of the Wranglers roster moved to Chicago, with the exception of Alan Risher, who stayed in Arizona to back up Greg Landry. The agreement allowed the team to move, while keeping a strong roster. Dennison remained a backup before retiring at the end of the season.
