= 1977 Dallas Cowboys season =

NFL team season

- Owner: Clint Murchison, Jr.
- General manager: Tex Schramm
- Head coach: Tom Landry
- Home stadium: Texas Stadium

Results
- Record: 12–2
- Division place: 1st in NFC East
- Playoffs: Won Divisional Playoffs (vs. Bears) 37–7; Won NFC Championship (vs. Vikings) 23–6; Won Super Bowl XII (vs. Broncos) 27–10

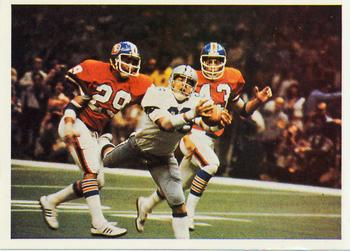
The Cowboys and Broncos in Super Bowl XII

The 1977 Dallas Cowboys season was their 18th in the National Football League (NFL). Rookie running back Tony Dorsett rushed for 1,007 yards and became the second member of the Cowboys (first since 1973) to have a 1,000-yard rushing season. Dallas scored 345 points, which ranked first in the NFC, while its defense only gave up 212 points. Dallas finished with a 12–2 record (tied with 1968 for the best record in the Landry era). The Cowboys made it to their fourth Super Bowl and beat the Denver Broncos to capture their second Super Bowl title. They were the first team from the NFC East Division to win two Super Bowls. Their 15–2 (.882) record (including the postseason) remains the highest single-season winning percentage in franchise history. The Cowboys became the 4th team in NFL history to win two Super Bowls, joining the Packers, Dolphins, and Steelers.

As in 1975, the Cowboys did not play this season on Thanksgiving, again replaced by the St. Louis Cardinals. As of 2025, this was the final season that the team did not play on the holiday.

The 1977 Cowboys ranked #17 on the 100 greatest teams of all time presented by the NFL on its 100th anniversary.

== Offseason ==
To improve their running game, the Cowboys orchestrated a big trade with the Seattle Seahawks, moving up in the NFL draft to acquire running back Tony Dorsett, the Heisman Trophy winner from national champion Pittsburgh.

With the retirement of Lee Roy Jordan, Bob Breunig became the starting middle linebacker, Randy White was moved to defensive tackle, and Thomas Henderson became a starter at strongside linebacker, turning the defense into a dominant unit.

=== Draft ===
1977 Dallas Cowboys draft
Round	Pick	Player	Position	College	Notes
1	2	Tony Dorsett * ^{†}	RB	Pittsburgh	Pick from SEA
2	54	Glenn Carano	QB	UNLV	
3	62	Tony Hill *	WR	Stanford	
3	81	Val Belcher	OG	Houston	
4	108	Guy Brown	LB	Houston	
5	137	Andy Frederick	OT	New Mexico	
6	164	Jim Cooper	OT	Temple	
7	191	Dave Stalls	DE	Northern Colorado	
8	208	Al Cleveland	DE	Pacific	
8	221	Fred Williams	RB	Arizona State	
9	248	Mark Cantrell	C	North Carolina	
10	275	Steve DeBerg	QB	San Jose State	
11	305	Don Wardlow	TE	Washington	
12	332	Greg Peters	OL	California	
Made roster † Pro Football Hall of Fame * Made at least one Pro Bowl during career

=== Undrafted free agents ===
1977 undrafted free agents of note
Player	Position	College
Thomas Bailey	Running back	Tulsa
Artie Belvin	Defensive back	UTEP
Larry Brinson	Running back	Florida
Jeff Butts	Tight end	Oregon
Bruce Huther	Linebacker	New Hampshire
Richard Jacobson	Defensive Line	Hamline
Lucien Johnson	Linebacker	UTEP
Abel Joe	Running back	Cheyney State
Dave Meteer	Offensive line	BYU
Keith Ponder	Defensive back	Northern Michigan
Fred Rayhle	Tight end	Chattanooga

== Roster ==
Dallas Cowboys 1977 roster
Quarterbacks: 18 Glenn Carano; 12 Roger Staubach; Running backs: 36 Larry Brinson; 21 Doug Dennison; 33 Tony Dorsett; 35 Scott Laidlaw; 44 Robert Newhouse; 26 Preston Pearson; Wide receivers: 80 Tony Hill; 86 Butch Johnson; 88 Drew Pearson; 83 Golden Richards; Tight ends: 89 Billy Joe DuPree; 87 Jay Saldi	Offensive linemen: 61 Jim Cooper G; 67 Pat Donovan T; 62 John Fitzgerald C; 71 Andy Frederick T; 66 Burton Lawless G; 73 Ralph Neely T; 64 Tom Rafferty G/C; 68 Herbert Scott G; 70 Rayfield Wright T; Defensive linemen: 63 Larry Cole DE/DT; 77 Bill Gregory DT; 72 Ed Jones DE; 79 Harvey Martin DE; 75 Jethro Pugh DT; 65 Dave Stalls DE; 54 Randy White DT	Linebackers: 53 Bob Breunig MLB; 59 Guy Brown OLB; 58 Mike Hegman OLB; 56 Thomas Henderson OLB; 57 Bruce Huther MLB; 50 D. D. Lewis OLB; Defensive backs: 31 Benny Barnes CB; 43 Cliff Harris FS; 42 Randy Hughes FS/SS; 25 Aaron Kyle CB; 20 Mel Renfro CB; 46 Mark Washington CB; 41 Charlie Waters SS; Special teams: 1 Efrén Herrera K; 11 Danny White P/QB	Reserve lists: 52 Jim Eidson T (IR); 81 Percy Howard WR (IR); 60 Greg Peters G (IR); 78 Greg Schaum DE (IR); 30 Charley Young RB (IR); Rookies in italics 45 active, 5 inactive

== Preseason ==
Week	Date	Opponent	Result	Record	Game Site	Attendance	Recap
1	August 6	San Diego Chargers	W 34–14	1–0	Texas Stadium	59,504	Recap
2	August 13	at Seattle Seahawks	L 17–23 (OT)	1–1	Kingdome	58,789	Recap
3	August 20	Miami Dolphins	L 14–20	1–2	Texas Stadium	58,620	Recap
4	August 27	Baltimore Colts	W 23–21	2–2	Texas Stadium	54,835	Recap
5	September 3	at Houston Oilers	L 14–23	2–3	Astrodome	49,777	Recap
6	September 8	Pittsburgh Steelers	W 30–0	3–3	Texas Stadium	49,824	Recap

== Regular season ==
- December 4, 1977 – Tony Dorsett becomes the first player in franchise history to rush for at least 200 yards in a game. Against the Philadelphia Eagles, Dorsett had 23 rushes for 206 yards and 2 touchdowns including an 84-yard touchdown run which was the longest during the 1977 NFL season.

=== Schedule ===
Week	Date	Opponent	Result	Record	Game Site	Attendance	Recap
1	September 18	at Minnesota Vikings	**W** 16–10 (OT)	1–0	Metropolitan Stadium	47,678	Recap
2	September 25	**New York Giants**	**W** 41–21	2–0	Texas Stadium	64,215	Recap
3	October 2	Tampa Bay Buccaneers	**W** 23–7	3–0	Texas Stadium	55,316	Recap
4	October 9	at **St. Louis Cardinals**	**W** 30–24	4–0	Busch Memorial Stadium	50,129	Recap
5	October 16	**Washington Redskins**	**W** 34–16	5–0	Texas Stadium	62,115	Recap
6	October 23	at **Philadelphia Eagles**	**W** 16–10	6–0	Veterans Stadium	65,507	Recap
7	October 30	Detroit Lions	**W** 37–0	7–0	Texas Stadium	63,160	Recap
8	November 6	at **New York Giants**	**W** 24–10	8–0	Giants Stadium	74,532	Recap
9	November 14	**St. Louis Cardinals**	**L** 17–24	8–1	Texas Stadium	64,038	Recap
10	November 20	at Pittsburgh Steelers	**L** 13–28	8–2	Three Rivers Stadium	49,761	Recap
11	November 27	at **Washington Redskins**	**W** 14–7	9–2	RFK Stadium	55,031	Recap
12	December 4	**Philadelphia Eagles**	**W** 24–14	10–2	Texas Stadium	60,289	Recap
13	December 12	at San Francisco 49ers	**W** 42–35	11–2	Candlestick Park	55,851	Recap
14	December 18	Denver Broncos	**W** 14–6	12–2	Texas Stadium	63,752	Recap

Division opponents are in bold text

=== Standings ===
NFC East
	W	L	T	PCT	DIV	CONF	PF	PA	STK
^{(1)} Dallas Cowboys	12	2	0	.857	7–1	11–1	345	212	W4
Washington Redskins	9	5	0	.643	4–4	8–4	196	189	W3
St. Louis Cardinals	7	7	0	.500	4–4	7–5	272	287	L4
Philadelphia Eagles	5	9	0	.357	2–6	4–8	220	207	W2
New York Giants	5	9	0	.357	3–5	5–7	181	265	L2

== Game summaries ==
=== Week 1: at Minnesota Vikings ===
Quarter	1	2	3	4	OT	Total
Cowboys	0	3	0	7	6	16
Vikings	7	0	0	3	0	10

at Metropolitan Stadium, Minneapolis, Minnesota

- Date: Sunday, September 18, 1977
- Game time: 1:00
- Game weather: 68°, wind 12 mph
- Referee: Pat Haggerty
- TV announcers (CBS): Pat Summerall and Tom Brookshier
- Box Score

Game information

First quarter

- MIN – Chuck Foreman 18-yard pass from Fran Tarkenton (Fred Cox kick)

Second quarter

- DAL – Efrén Herrera 40-yard field goal

Fourth quarter

- DAL – Preston Pearson 7-yard pass from Roger Staubach (Efrén Herrera kick)
- MIN – Fred Cox 35-yard field goal

Overtime

- DAL – Roger Staubach 4-yard run (no PAT attempt)

Passing

- DAL – Roger Staubach 18/30, 196 yds, TD, lng 23, rate 90.4
- MIN – Fran Tarkenton 13/32, 182 yds, TD, 3 INT, lng 25, rate 31.0

Rushing

- DAL – Preston Pearson 15 att, 63 yds, lng 22
- MIN – Chuck Foreman 22 att, 66 yds, lng 9

Receiving

- DAL – Billy Joe DuPree 4 rec, 57 yds, lng 23
- MIN – Chuck Foreman 5 rec, 56 yds, TD, lng 20

Defense

- DAL - Cliff Harris 2 INT
- DAL - Thomas Henderson 1 INT

Kick returns

- DAL - Butch Johnson 2 rt, 69 yds, 34.5 y/rt
- DAL - Larry Brinson 1 rt, 15 yds, 15.0 y/rt
- MIN - Brent McClanahan 2 rt, 40 yds, 20.0 y/rt
- MIN - Robert Miller 1 rt, 12 yds, 12.0 y/rt

Punt returns

- DAL - Butch Johnson 4 rt, 28 yds, 7.0 y/rt
- MIN - Bob Grim 3 rt, 10 yds, 3.3 y/rt

Kicking

- DAL - Efrén Herrera 1 XPM, 1 XPA, 1 FGM, 2 FGA
- MIN - Fred Cox 1 XPM, 1 XPA, 1 FGM, 2 FGA

Punting

- DAL - Danny White 9 pnts, 352 yds, 39.1 y/pnt
- MIN - Neil Clabo 5 pnts, 177 yds, 35.4 y/pnt

=== Week 2: vs. New York Giants ===
Quarter	1	2	3	4	Total
Giants	0	7	14	0	21
Cowboys	14	17	3	7	41

at Texas Stadium, Irving, Texas

- Date: Sunday, September 25, 1977
- Game time: 1:00
- Game weather: 88°, wind 16 mph
- Referee: Gordon McCarter
- TV announcers (CBS): Pat Summerall and Tom Brookshier
- Box Score

Game information

First quarter

- DAL – Roger Staubach 2-yard run (Efrén Herrera kick)
- DAL – Preston Pearson 10-yard pass from Roger Staubach (Efrén Herrera kick)

Second quarter

- DAL – Doug Dennison 1-yard run (Efrén Herrera kick)
- DAL – Tony Dorsett 11-yard run (Efrén Herrera kick)
- NYG – Willie Spencer 1-yard run (Joe Danelo kick)
- DAL – Efrén Herrera 37-yard field goal

Third quarter

- NYG – Bobby Hammond 68-yard punt return (Joe Danelo kick)
- DAL – Efrén Herrera 41-yard field goal
- NYG – Doug Kotar 3-yard run (Joe Danelo kick)

Fourth quarter

- DAL – Tony Dorsett 34-yard run (Efrén Herrera kick)

Passing

- NYG – Joe Pisarcik 9/23, 129 yds, 2 INT, lng 54, rate 21.8
- DAL – Roger Staubach 18/29, 235 yds, TD, lng 4, rate 2.8

Rushing

- NYG – Larry Csonka 9 att, 39 yds, lng 14
- DAL – Tony Dorsett 7 att, 62 yds, 2 TD, lng 6

Receiving

- NYG – Johnny Perkins 1 rec, 54 yds, lng 14
- DAL – Drew Pearson 6 rec, 97 yds, lng 13

Defense

- DAL - Randy Hughes INT, 8 yds, lng 8
- DAL - Aaron Kyle INT, 9 yds, lng 9
- DAL - D.D. Lewis INT, 29 yds, lng 29

Kick returns

- DAL - Larry Brinson 2 rt, 43 yds, 21.5 y/rt
- NYG - Bobby Hammond 3 rt, 85 yds, 28.3 y/rt
- NYG - Gordon Bell 2 rt, 48 yds, 24.0 y/rt
- NYG - Emery Moorehead 1 rt, 24 yds, 24.0 y/rt
- NYG - Beasley Reece 1 rt, 16 yds, 16.0 y/rt

Punt returns

- DAL - Butch Johnson 6 rt, 61 yds, 10.2 y/rt
- DAL - Tony Hill 1 rt, 4 yds, 4.0 y/rt
- NYG - Bobby Hammond 3 rt, 72 yds, 24.0 y/rt, TD

Kicking

- DAL - Efrén Herrera 5 XPM, 5 XPA, 2 FGM, 3 FGA

Punting

- DAL - Danny White 6 pnts, 259 yds, 43.2 y/pnt
- NYG - Dave Jennings 8 pnts, 331 yds, 41.4 y/pnt

=== Week 3: vs. Tampa Bay Buccaneers ===
Quarter	1	2	3	4	Total
Buccaneers	0	7	0	0	7
Cowboys	17	3	3	0	23

at Texas Stadium, Irving, Texas

- Date: Sunday, October 2, 1977
- Game time: 12:00
- Game weather: 74 F, wind 15 mph
- Game attendance: 55,316
- Referee: Bernie Ulman
- TV announcers (CBS): Frank Glieber and Alex Hawkins
- Box Score

Game information

First quarter

- DAL – Efrén Herrera 32-yard field goal
- DAL – Thomas Henderson 79-yard interception return (Efrén Herrera kick)
- DAL – Robert Newhouse 17-yard run (Efrén Herrera kick)

Second quarter

- TB – Richard Wood 37-yard fumble return (Allan Leavitt kick)
- DAL – Efrén Herrera 19-yard field goal

Third quarter

- DAL – Efrén Herrera 20-yard field goal

Passing

- TB – Gary Huff 8/23, 107 yards, 2 INT, lng 30, rate 14.2
- DAL – Roger Staubach 15/24, 212 yards, INT, lng 24, rate 73.6

Rushing

- TB – Anthony Davis 15 att, 30 yards, lng 9
- DAL – Robert Newhouse 16 att, 73 yards, TD, lng 17

Receiving

- TB – Morris Owens 4 rec, 57 yards, lng 24
- DAL – Preston Pearson 5 rec, 65 yards, lng 21

Defense

- TB - Richard Wood 1 INT, 29 yards, lng 29
- DAL - Thomas Henderson 2 INT, 79 yards, TD

Kick returns

- TB - Isaac Hagins 5 rt, 118 yards, 23.6 y/rt
- TB - Anthony Davis 1 rt, 19 yards, 19.0 y/rt
- DAL - Butch Johnson 2 rt, 39 yards, 19.5 y/rt

Punt returns

- TB - Isaac Hagins 2 rt, 1 yd, 0.5 y/rt
- TB - Danny Reece 1 rt, 3 yds, 3.0 y/rt
- DAL - Butch Johnson 6 rt, 88 yds, 14.7 y/rt

Kicking

- DAL - Efrén Herrera 2 XPM, 2 XPA, 3 FGM, 4 FGA

Punting

- TB - Dave Green 10 pnts, 415 yds, 41.5 y/pnt
- DAL - Danny White 5 pnts, 216 yds, 43.2 y/pnt

=== Week 4: at St. Louis Cardinals ===
Quarter	1	2	3	4	Total
Cowboys	3	10	3	14	30
Cardinals	10	7	7	0	24

at Busch Stadium, St. Louis, Missouri

- Date: Sunday, October 9, 1977
- Game time: 1:00 p.m.
- Game weather: 49 F, wind 13 mph
- Referee: Fred Silva
- TV announcers (CBS): Vin Scully and Alex Hawkins
- Box Score

Game information

First quarter

- STL – Jim Bakken 32-yard field goal
- DAL – Efrén Herrera 29-yard field goal
- STL – Terry Metcalf 62-yard run (Jim Bakken kick)

Second quarter

- DAL – Tony Dorsett 77-yard run (Efrén Herrera kick)
- STL – Mel Gray 60-yard pass from Jim Hart (Jim Bakken kick)
- DAL – Efrén Herrera 40-yard field goal

Third quarter

- DAL – Efrén Herrera 44-yard field goal
- STL – Charles Davis 35-yard fumble return (Jim Bakken kick)

Fourth quarter

- DAL – Tony Dorsett 1-yard run (Efrén Herrera kick)
- DAL – Golden Richards 17-yard pass from Roger Staubach (Efrén Herrera kick)

Passing

- DAL – Roger Staubach 18/29, 153 yards, TD, lng 17, rate 87.3
- STL – Jim Hart 9/32, 186 yards, TD, 2 INT, lng 60, rate 35.7
- STL - Terry Metcalf 1/2, 9 yards, lng 9, rate 62.5

Rushing

- DAL – Tony Dorsett 14 att, 141 yards, 2 TD, lng 77
- STL – Terry Metcalf 10 att, 79 yards, TD, lng 32

Receiving

- DAL – Drew Pearson 6 rec, 55 yards, lng 12
- STL – Mel Gray 3 rec, 84 yards, TD, lng 60

Defense

- DAL - Cliff Harris INT, 7 yards, lng 7
- DAL - Charlie Waters INT, 3 yards, lng 3

=== Week 5: vs. Washington Redskins ===
Quarter	1	2	3	4	Total
Redskins	6	7	3	0	16
Cowboys	0	14	6	14	34

at Texas Stadium, Irving, Texas

- Date: Sunday, October 16
- Game time: 3:00 pm
- Game weather: 56 F, wind 8 mph
- Referee: Dick Jorgensen
- TV announcers (CBS): Pat Summerall and Tom Brookshier
- Box Score

Game information

First quarter

- WSH – Mark Moseley 25-yard field goal
- WSH – Mark Moseley 40-yard field goal

Second quarter

- DAL – Golden Richards 50-yard pass from Roger Staubach (Efrén Herrera kick)
- DAL – Robert Newhouse 7-yard run (Efrén Herrera kick)
- WSH – Clarence Harmon 1-yard pass from Joe Theismann (Mark Moseley kick)

Third quarter

- WSH – Mark Moseley 53-yard field goal
- DAL – Efrén Herrera 44-yard field goal
- DAL – Efrén Herrera 52-yard field goal

Fourth quarter

- DAL – Drew Pearson 59-yard pass from Roger Staubach (Efrén Herrera kick)
- DAL – Robert Newhouse 6-yard run (Efrén Herrera kick)

Passing

- WSH – Billy Kilmer 4/15, 45 yards, INT
- DAL – Roger Staubach 15/28, 250 yards, 2 TD

Rushing

- WSH – Mike Thomas 15 att, 46 yards
- DAL – Robert Newhouse 17 att, 71 yards, 2 TD

Receiving

- WSH – Charley Taylor 2 rec, 32 yards
- DAL – Drew Pearson 6 rec, 157 yards, TD

=== Week 6: at Philadelphia Eagles ===
Quarter	1	2	3	4	Total
Cowboys	0	6	0	10	16
Eagles	0	7	0	3	10

at Veterans Stadium, Philadelphia

- Date: Sunday, October 23
- Game time: 1:00 pm
- Game weather: 53 F, wind 11 mph
- Referee: Don Wedge
- TV announcers (CBS): Lindsey Nelson and Paul Hornung
- Box Score

Game information

Second quarter

- PHI – Charlie Smith 12-yard pass from Ron Jaworski (Horst Muhlmann kick)
- DAL – Tony Dorsett 5-yard run (kick failed)

Fourth quarter

- DAL – Charlie Waters 17-yard punt return (Efrén Herrera kick)
- DAL – Efrén Herrera 18-yard field goal
- PHI – Horst Muhlmann 32-yard field goal

Passing

- DAL – Roger Staubach 15/26, 172 yards
- PHI – Ron Jaworski 10/23, 104 yards, TD, 2 INT

Rushing

- DAL – Tony Dorsett 13 att, 48 yards, TD
- PHI – Tom Sullivan 13 att, 61 yards

Receiving

- DAL – Drew Pearson 4 rec, 54 yards
- PHI – Keith Krepfle 3 rec, 40 yards

=== Week 7: vs. Detroit Lions ===
Quarter	1	2	3	4	Total
Lions	0	0	0	0	0
Cowboys	3	20	7	7	37

at Texas Stadium, Irving, Texas

- Date: Sunday, October 30
- Game time: 1:00
- Game weather: 70 F, wind 11 mph
- Referee: Chuck Heberling
- TV announcers (CBS): Lindsey Nelson and Paul Hornung
- Box Score

Game information

First quarter

- DAL – Efrén Herrera 21-yard field goal

Second quarter

- DAL – Efrén Herrera 45-yard field goal
- DAL – Billy Joe DuPree 14-yard pass from Roger Staubach (Efrén Herrera kick)
- DAL – Scott Laidlaw 18-yard pass from Roger Staubach (Efrén Herrera kick)
- DAL – Efrén Herrera 30-yard field goal

Third quarter

- DAL – Jay Saldi 1-yard pass from Roger Staubach (Efrén Herrera kick)

Fourth quarter

- DAL – Larry Brinson 20-yard run (Efrén Herrera kick)

Passing

- DET – Joe Reed 6/16, 75 yards, INT
- DAL – Roger Staubach 16/25, 179 yards, 3 TD

Rushing

- DET – Horace King 8 att, 26 yards
- DAL – Tony Dorsett 13 att, 48 yards

Receiving

- DET – Rick Kane 2 rec, 30 yards
- DAL – Tony Dorsett 5 rec, 48 yards

=== Week 8: at New York Giants ===
Quarter	1	2	3	4	Total
Cowboys	7	7	7	3	24
Giants	0	3	7	0	10

at The Meadowlands, East Rutherford, New Jersey

- Date: Sunday, November 6
- Game time: 1:00 pm
- Game weather: 54 F, wind 16 mph
- Referee: Gene Barth
- TV announcers (CBS): Vin Scully and Alex Hawkins
- Box Score

Game information

First quarter

- DAL – Jay Saldi 8-yard fumble return (Efrén Herrera kick)

Second quarter

- NYG – Joe Danelo 51-yard field goal
- DAL – Billy Joe DuPree 5-yard pass from Roger Staubach (Efrén Herrera kick)

Third quarter

- DAL – Tony Dorsett 1-yard run (Efrén Herrera kick)
- NYG – Bobby Hammond 1-yard run (Joe Danelo kick)

Fourth quarter

- DAL – Efrén Herrera 35-yard field goal

Passing

- DAL – Roger Staubach 14/25, 190 yards, TD
- NYG – Joe Pisarcik 6/17, 61 yards, INT

Rushing

- DAL – Robert Newhouse 11 att, 41 yards
- NYG – Larry Csonka 15 att, 47 yards

Receiving

- DAL – Drew Pearson 3 rec, 89 yards
- NYG – Johnny Perkins 4 rec, 34 yards

=== Week 9: vs. St. Louis Cardinals ===
Quarter	1	2	3	4	Total
Cardinals	3	0	7	14	24
Cowboys	0	14	0	3	17

at Texas Stadium, Irving, Texas

- Date: Monday, November 14
- Game time: 8:00 pm
- Game weather: 61 F, wind 12 mph
- Referee: Jim Tunney
- TV announcers (ABC): Frank Gifford, Howard Cosell and Don Meredith
- Box Score

Game information

First quarter

- STL – Jim Bakken 26-yard field goal

Second quarter

- DAL – Tony Dorsett 1-yard run (Efrén Herrera kick)
- DAL – Billy Joe DuPree 2-yard pass from Roger Staubach (Efrén Herrera kick)

Third quarter

- STL – Wayne Morris 1-yard run (Jim Bakken kick)

Fourth quarter

- DAL – Efrén Herrera 21-yard field goal
- STL – Mel Gray 49-yard pass from Jim Hart (Jim Bakken kick)
- STL – Jackie Smith 3-yard pass from Jim Hart (Jim Bakken kick)

Passing

- STL – Jim Hart 10/24, 141 yards, 2 TD, INT
- DAL – Roger Staubach 11/20, 102 yards, TD, 2 INT

Rushing

- STL – Wayne Morris 21 att, 72 yards, TD
- DAL – Robert Newhouse 12 att, 61 yards

Receiving

- STL – Mel Gray 3 rec, 76 yards, TD
- DAL – Drew Pearson 4 rec, 45 yards

=== Week 10: at Pittsburgh Steelers ===
Quarter	1	2	3	4	Total
Cowboys	6	7	0	0	13
Steelers	0	14	14	0	28

at Three Rivers Stadium, Pittsburgh

- Date: Sunday, November 20
- Game time: 4:00 pm
- Game weather: 48 F, wind 9 mph
- Referee: Bob Frederic
- TV announcers (CBS): Pat Summerall and Tom Brookshier
- Box Score

Game information

First quarter

- DAL – Tony Dorsett 13-yard run (kick failed)

Second quarter

- PIT – Franco Harris 61-yard run (Roy Gerela kick)
- DAL – Jay Saldi 23-yard pass from Roger Staubach (Efrén Herrera kick)
- PIT – Lynn Swann 9-yard pass from Terry Bradshaw (Roy Gerela kick)

Third quarter

- PIT – John Stallworth 28-yard pass from Terry Bradshaw (Roy Gerela kick)
- PIT – Franco Harris 2-yard run (Roy Gerela kick)

Passing

- DAL – Roger Staubach 18/26, 230 yards, TD, 2 INT
- PIT – Terry Bradshaw 7/12, 106 yards, 2 TD

Rushing

- DAL – Tony Dorsett 17 att, 73 yards, TD
- PIT – Franco Harris 29 att, 179 yards, 2 TD

Receiving

- DAL – Billy Joe DuPree 3 rec, 45 yards
- PIT – John Stallworth 4 rec, 46 yards, TD

=== Week 11: at Washington Redskins ===
Quarter	1	2	3	4	Total
Cowboys	0	0	7	7	14
Redskins	0	7	0	0	7

at RFK Stadium, Washington, D.C.

- Date: Sunday, November 27
- Game time: 4:00 pm
- Game weather: 31 F, wind 16 mph
- Referee: Gordon McCarter
- TV announcers (CBS): Pat Summerall and Tom Brookshier
- Box Score

Game information

Second quarter

- WSH – Joe Theismann 1-yard run (Mark Moseley kick)

Third quarter

- DAL – Golden Richards 4-yard pass from Roger Staubach (Efrén Herrera kick)

Fourth quarter

- DAL – Tony Dorsett 1-yard run (Efrén Herrera kick)

Passing

- DAL – Roger Staubach 10/24, 138 yards, TD, INT
- WSH – Joe Theismann 17/35, 231 yards, INT

Rushing

- DAL – Tony Dorsett 19 att, 64 yards, TD
- WSH – Calvin Hill 4 att, 44 yards

Receiving

- DAL – Drew Pearson 2 rec, 79 yards
- WSH – Frank Grant 6 rec, 89 yards

=== Week 12: vs. Philadelphia Eagles ===
Quarter	1	2	3	4	Total
Eagles	0	7	7	0	14
Cowboys	7	7	3	7	24

at Texas Stadium, Irving, Texas

- Date: Sunday, December 4
- Game time: 1:00 pm
- Game weather: 59 F, wind 12 mph
- Referee: Pat Haggerty
- TV announcers (CBS): Vin Scully and Alex Hawkins
- Box Score

Game information

First quarter

- DAL – Tony Dorsett 1-yard run (Efrén Herrera kick)

Second quarter

- PHI – Mike Hogan 51-yard pass from Ron Jaworski (Nick Mike-Mayer kick)
- DAL – Drew Pearson 16-yard pass from Roger Staubach (Efrén Herrera kick)

Third quarter

- PHI – Harold Carmichael 12-yard pass from Ron Jaworski (Nick Mike-Mayer kick)
- DAL – Efrén Herrera 24-yard field goal

Fourth quarter

- DAL – Tony Dorsett 84-yard run (Efrén Herrera kick)

Passing

- PHI – Ron Jaworski 18/32, 199 yards, 2 TD, 2 INT
- DAL – Roger Staubach 13/26, 183 yards, TD, 2 INT

Rushing

- PHI – Mike Hogan 6 att, 25 yards
- DAL – Tony Dorsett 23 att, 206 yards, 2 TD

Receiving

- PHI – Mike Hogan 3 rec, 59 yards, TD
- DAL – Preston Pearson 3 rec, 70 yards

=== Week 13: at San Francisco 49ers ===
Quarter	1	2	3	4	Total
Cowboys	0	21	7	14	42
49ers	7	7	7	14	35

at Candlestick Park, San Francisco

- Date: Monday, December 12
- Game time: 6:00 p.m. PST
- Game weather: 53 F, wind 6 mph
- Referee: Dick Jorgensen
- TV announcers (ABC): Frank Gifford, Howard Cosell and Don Meredith
- Box Score

Game information

First quarter

- SF – Bob Ferrell 1-yard run (Ray Wersching kick)

Second quarter

- DAL – Roger Staubach 1-yard run (Efrén Herrera kick)
- DAL – Preston Pearson 36-yard pass from Roger Staubach (Efrén Herrera kick)
- SF – Kenny Harrison 10-yard pass from Jim Plunkett (Ray Wersching kick)
- DAL – Tony Dorsett 20-yard pass from Roger Staubach (Efrén Herrera kick)

Third quarter

- DAL – Tony Dorsett 21-yard run (Efrén Herrera kick)
- SF – Gene Washington 27-yard pass from Jim Plunkett (Ray Wersching kick)

Fourth quarter

- DAL – Butch Johnson 22-yard pass from Roger Staubach (Efrén Herrera kick)
- SF – Devlin Williams 1-yard pass from Jim Plunkett (Ray Wersching kick)
- DAL – Preston Pearson 3-yard run (Efrén Herrera kick)
- SF – Paul Seal 47-yard pass from Jim Plunkett (Ray Wersching kick)

Passing

- DAL -Roger Staubach 14/19, 220 yards, 3 TD
- SF – Jim Plunkett 15/29, 263 yards, 4 TD

Rushing

- DAL – Tony Dorsett 20 att, 92 yards, TD
- SF – Delvin Williams 17 att, 44 yards

Receiving

- DAL – Drew Pearson 4 rec, 61 yards
- SF – Gene Washington 5 rec, 130 yards, TD

=== Week 14: vs. Denver Broncos ===
Quarter	1	2	3	4	Total
Broncos	0	0	3	3	6
Cowboys	7	0	7	0	14

at Texas Stadium, Irving, Texas

- Date: Sunday, December 18
- Game time: 3:00 pm
- Game weather: 52 F, wind 10 mph
- Referee: Jerry Markbreit
- TV announcers (NBC): Jack Buck and Len Dawson
- Box Score

Game information

First quarter

- DAL – Preston Pearson 22-yard pass from Roger Staubach (Efrén Herrera kick)

Third quarter

- DAL – Robert Newhouse 7-yard pass from Roger Staubach (Efrén Herrera kick)
- DEN – Jim Turner 22-yard field goal

Fourth quarter

- DEN – Jim Turner 37-yard field goal

Passing

- DEN – Norris Weese 10/19, 94 yards
- DAL – Roger Staubach 15/20, 160 yards, 2 TD, INT

Rushing

- DEN – Norris Weese 6 att, 33 yards
- DAL – Tony Dorsett 17 att, 50 yards

Receiving

- DEN – Jack Dolbin 5 rec, 85 yards
- DAL – Preston Pearson 6 rec, 48 yards, TD

== Postseason ==
Round	Date	Opponent	Result	Game Site	Attendance	Recap
Divisional	December 26, 1977	Chicago Bears (4)	W 37–7	Texas Stadium	63,260	Recap
NFC Championship	January 1, 1978	Minnesota Vikings (3)	W 23–6	Texas Stadium	64,293	Recap
Super Bowl XII	January 15, 1978	vs Denver Broncos (A 1)	W 27–10	Louisiana Superdome	75,583	Recap

=== NFC Divisional Playoff ===
Dallas Cowboys 37, Chicago Bears 7

Quarter	1	2	3	4	Total
Bears	0	0	0	7	7
Cowboys	7	10	17	3	37

at Texas Stadium, Irving, Texas

- Date: December 26, 1977
- Game time: 1:00 p.m. CST
- Game weather: 49 °F (9 °C), mostly cloudy
- Game attendance: 63,260
- Referee: Gordon McCarter
- TV announcers (CBS): Pat Summerall and Tom Brookshier
- Box Score

Game information

First quarter

- DAL – Doug Dennison 2-yard run (Efrén Herrera kick)

Second quarter

- DAL – Billy Joe DuPree 28-yard pass from Roger Staubach (Efrén Herrera kick)
- DAL – Efrén Herrera 21-yard field goal

Third quarter

- DAL – Tony Dorsett 23-yard run (Efrén Herrera kick)
- DAL – Efrén Herrera 31-yard field goal
- DAL – Tony Dorsett 7-yard run (Efrén Herrera kick)

Fourth quarter

- DAL – Efrén Herrera 27-yard field goal
- CHI – Steve Schubert 34-yard pass from Bob Avellini (Bob Thomas kick)

Passing

- CHI – Bob Avellini 15/25, 177 yds, TD, 4 INT
- DAL – Roger Staubach 8/13, 134 yds, TD, INT

Rushing

- CHI – Walter Payton 19 att, 60 yds
- DAL – Tony Dorsett 17 att, 85 yds, 2 TD

Receiving

- CHI – Steve Schubert 5 rec, 69 yds, TD
- DAL – Drew Pearson 2 rec, 38 yds

=== NFC Championship Game ===
Dallas Cowboys 23, Minnesota Vikings 6

Quarter	1	2	3	4	Total
Vikings	0	6	0	0	6
Cowboys	6	10	0	7	23

at Texas Stadium, Irving, Texas

- Date: January 1, 1978
- Game time: 4:30 p.m. CST
- Game weather: 30 °F (−1 °C), cloudy
- Game attendance: 64,293
- Referee: Pat Haggerty
- TV announcers (CBS): Vin Scully and Alex Hawkins
- Box Score

Game information

First quarter

- DAL – Golden Richards 32-yard pass from Roger Staubach (kick failed)

Second quarter

- DAL – Robert Newhouse 5-yard run (Efrén Herrera kick)
- MIN – Fred Cox 32-yard field goal
- MIN – Fred Cox 37-yard field goal
- DAL – Efrén Herrera 21-yard field goal

Fourth quarter

- DAL – Tony Dorsett 11-yard run (Efrén Herrera kick)

Passing

- MIN – Bob Lee 14/31, 158 yds, INT
- DAL – Roger Staubach 12/23, 165 yds, TD, INT

Rushing

- MIN – Chuck Foreman 21 att, 59 yds
- DAL – Robert Newhouse 15 att, 81 yds, TD

Receiving

- MIN – Sammy White 3 rec, 46 yds
- DAL – Drew Pearson 4 rec, 62 yds

=== Super Bowl XII ===
Dallas Cowboys 27, Denver Broncos 10

Quarter	1	2	3	4	Total
Cowboys (NFC)	10	3	7	7	27
Broncos (AFC)	0	0	10	0	10

at Louisiana Superdome, New Orleans

- Date: January 15, 1978
- Game attendance: 75,583
- Referee: Jim Tunney
- TV announcers (CBS): Pat Summerall and Tom Brookshier
- Box Score

Game information

First quarter

- DAL – Tony Dorsett 3-yard run (Efrén Herrera kick)
- DAL – Efrén Herrera 35-yard field goal

Second quarter

- DAL – Efrén Herrera 43-yard field goal

Third quarter

- DEN – Jim Turner 47-yard field goal
- DAL – Butch Johnson 45-yard pass from Roger Staubach (Efrén Herrera kick)
- DEN – Rob Lytle 1-yard run (Jim Turner kick)

Fourth quarter

- DAL – Golden Richards 29-yard pass from Robert Newhouse (Efrén Herrera kick)

Passing

- DAL – Roger Staubach 17/25, 183 yds, TD
- DEN – Craig Morton 4/15, 39 yds, 4 INT

Rushing

- DAL – Tony Dorsett 15 att, 66 yds, TD
- DEN – Rob Lytle 10 att, 35 yds, TD

Receiving

- DAL – Billy Joe DuPree 4 rec, 66 yds
- DEN – Jack Dolbin 2 rec, 24 yds

== Season recap ==
With an improved offense and defense, the Cowboys finished with a 12–2 regular season record, breezing through the playoffs by beating the Chicago Bears 37–7 in the divisional round, defeating the Minnesota Vikings 23–6 in the NFC Championship Game and winning Super Bowl XII 27–10 against the Denver Broncos.

Dorsett set a franchise rookie record with 1,007 rushing yards. Defensive end Harvey Martin had one of the greatest seasons ever by an NFL player. In a 14-game season he totaled 85 tackles and an estimated league-leading 23 sacks (more than Michael Strahan's 22.5 record in 16 games), he was named the NFL Defensive Player of the Year, a consensus All-Pro selection, was a key player in the Cowboys winning Super Bowl XII, and a co-MVP of the game with Randy White.

== Awards and records ==
- Tony Dorsett, NFL Offensive Rookie of the Year Award
- Tony Dorsett, All-Pro Selection
- Efrén Herrera, Five Field Goals Attempted in one Super Bowl game, Super Bowl record
- Harvey Martin, Super Bowl Most Valuable Player
- Harvey Martin, NFL Defensive Player of the Year
- Harvey Martin, Led NFL, Sacks (23)
- Drew Pearson, Led NFL Receiving Yards (870)
- Drew Pearson, All-Pro Selection
- Drew Pearson, Pro Bowl Selection
- Roger Staubach, All-Pro Selection
- Roger Staubach, Pro Bowl Selection
- Roger Staubach, Led NFC, Touchdown Passes (18)
- Roger Staubach, NFC Passing Leader
- Randy White, Super Bowl Most Valuable Player
- Led NFC, Points Scored (345)
- Led NFC, Fewest Rushing Yards Allowed (1,651)
- Led NFL, Fewest Total Yards Allowed (3,213)
- Led NFL, Total Yards, (4,812)

== Publications ==
- The Football Encyclopedia ISBN 0-312-11435-4
- Total Football ISBN 0-06-270170-3
- Cowboys Have Always Been My Heroes ISBN 0-446-51950-2
