= Super Bowl X =

1976 National Football League championship game

Dallas Cowboys (4) (NFC) (10–4)	Pittsburgh Steelers (1) (AFC) (12–2)
17	21
Head coach: Tom Landry	Head coach: Chuck Noll
	1	2	3	4	Total
DAL	7	3	0	7	17
PIT	7	0	0	14	21
- Date: January 18, 1976
- Kickoff time: 2:14 p.m. EST (UTC-5)
- Stadium: Miami Orange Bowl; Miami, Florida
- MVP: Lynn Swann, wide receiver
- Favorite: Steelers by 7
- Referee: Norm Schachter
- Attendance: 80,187

Ceremonies
- National anthem: Tom Sullivan and Up With People
- Coin toss: Former Secretary of the Navy John Warner
- Halftime show: Up with People presents "200 Years and Just a Baby: Tribute to America's Bicentennial"

TV in the United States
- Network: CBS
- Announcers: Pat Summerall, Tom Brookshier, and Hank Stram (4th quarter only)
- Nielsen ratings: 42.3 (est. 57.7 million viewers)
- Market share: 78
- Cost of 30-second commercial: $110,000

Radio in the United States
- Network: CBS Radio
- Announcers: Ed Ingles and Jim Kelly

Super Bowl X was an American football game between the National Football Conference (NFC) champion Dallas Cowboys and the American Football Conference (AFC) champion Pittsburgh Steelers to decide the National Football League (NFL) champion for the 1975 season. The Steelers defeated the Cowboys 21–17 to become the third franchise to win consecutive Super Bowls, joining the Miami Dolphins (VII, VIII) and Green Bay Packers (I, II). It was also the first Super Bowl in which both teams had previous Super Bowl titles, as the Steelers were the defending champions and the Cowboys had won four years earlier.

Played at the Orange Bowl in Miami, Florida, on January 18, 1976, this was one of the first major national events of the United States Bicentennial year. Both the pre-game and halftime show celebrated the Bicentennial, while players on both teams wore special patches on their jerseys with the Bicentennial logo.

Super Bowl X featured a contrast of playing styles between the Steelers and the Cowboys, which were the two most popular teams in the league. The Steelers, dominating teams with their "Steel Curtain" defense and running game, finished the regular season with a league best 12–2 record to gain home field advantage in the playoffs, then defeated the Baltimore Colts and Oakland Raiders. With their balanced offense and "flex" defense, the Cowboys became the first NFC wild-card team to advance to the Super Bowl after a 10–4 regular season and postseason victories on the road over the Minnesota Vikings and Los Angeles Rams.

The Steelers trailed 7–10 after a scoreless third quarter, in the second Super Bowl where the winning team was behind at halftime (V: the Colts trailed the Cowboys 6–13 at the half and won 16–13), but rallied to score 14 unanswered points, including a 64-yard touchdown reception by Pittsburgh wide receiver Lynn Swann. Dallas wide receiver Percy Howard's 34-yard touchdown reception late in the game pulled them within four points at 21–17, but Pittsburgh safety Glen Edwards halted Dallas' rally with an end zone interception as time expired. Swann, who caught four passes for a Super Bowl record 161 yards and one touchdown, became the first wide receiver to be named Super Bowl MVP.

== Background ==
=== Host selection process ===
The NFL awarded Super Bowl X to Miami on April 3, 1973, at the owners' meetings held in Scottsdale, Arizona. This was the fourth time the Super Bowl was to be played at the Miami Orange Bowl. For the second time, the owners selected two consecutive Super Bowl host cities at the same meeting. Only three cities submitted bids for the two games. Representatives from New Orleans, Miami, and Los Angeles each made presentations; all three cities had already hosted the Super Bowl. New Orleans was awarded Super Bowl IX, while Miami was given X.

As part of their pitch, the representatives from Miami specifically requested the 1976 game over the 1975 game. Miami had initially been selected as one of the United States Bicentennial celebration cities, so Joe Robbie and Don Shula lobbied in favor of tying the game to the Bicentennial.

=== Dallas Cowboys ===
The Cowboys, considered a Cinderella team entering the Super Bowl, advanced to their third Super Bowl in team history with their rather high-tech offense and "flex" defense. Quarterback Roger Staubach had a solid season, passing for 2,666 yards and 17 touchdowns (but he also threw 16 interceptions), while also rushing for 310 yards. Staubach's favorite target was wide receiver Drew Pearson who led the team with 46 receptions for 822 yards and 8 touchdowns. Wide receiver Golden Richards and tight end Jean Fugett were also reliable targets in the Cowboys' passing game, combining for 59 receptions and 939 receiving yards.

But despite their solid passing game, Dallas was a run-based team. Fullback Robert Newhouse was their leading rusher with 930 yards, and also caught 34 passes for 274 yards. Halfback Doug Dennison contributed 388 yards. Perhaps the most talented player in the backfield was halfback Preston Pearson (no relation to receiver Drew Pearson), who signed on the team as a free agent after being cut by the Steelers in the preseason. Preston rushed for 509 yards, caught 27 passes for 351 yards, and added another 391 yards returning kickoffs. Preston had been especially effective in the playoffs, where he caught 12 passes for 200 yards and three touchdowns, and was extremely eager to increase his numbers in the Super Bowl against the team which let him go. Up front, the offensive line was led by All-Pro right tackle Rayfield Wright.

The Cowboys' "Flex" defense was anchored by linemen Harvey Martin and Ed "Too Tall" Jones. Linebacker Lee Roy Jordan led the team with six interceptions, while linebacker D.D. Lewis was an effective weapon pass rushing. The starting players in Dallas' defensive secondary, future Hall of Fame cornerback Mel Renfro, cornerback Mark Washington, and safeties Charlie Waters and future Hall of Famer Cliff Harris, combined for 12 interceptions.

Even though the Cowboys finished in second place in the NFC East with a 10–4 record, they qualified for the playoffs as the NFC's wild-card team (at the time, only one wild card team from each conference entered the playoffs). The Dallas Cowboys became the first NFC wild card team to reach the Super Bowl.

=== Pittsburgh Steelers ===
The Steelers became the first official #1 seed to reach the Super Bowl. Playoff seeds were instituted in 1975. The Steelers finished the regular season with a league-best 12–2 record, dominating opponents with their "Steel Curtain" defense and powerful running game. The team finished the season ranked 5th in most points scored (373) and 2nd in fewest points allowed (162). Fullback Franco Harris had the best season of his career and ranked second in the league with 1,246 rushing yards and 10 touchdowns, while also catching 28 passes for 214 yards and another touchdown. Halfback Rocky Bleier had 528 rushing yards, and fullback John "Frenchy" Fuqua added 285 yards and 18 receptions. Still, the Steelers had a fine passing attack led by quarterback Terry Bradshaw. Bradshaw threw for 2,055 yards, 18 touchdowns, and nine interceptions while rushing for 210 yards and three touchdowns. One reason why Bradshaw's numbers were much improved from the previous season was the emergence of wide receivers Lynn Swann and John Stallworth. Both saw limited playing time in the previous season, but became significant contributors in 1975. Swann caught a team-leading 49 passes for 781 yards and 11 touchdowns. Stallworth only had 20 receptions, but he had an average of 21.2 yards per catch, recording a total of 423 reception yards.

The Steelers' "Steel Curtain" defense dominated the league, ranking third in fewest yards allowed (4,019) and sending 8 of their 11 starters to the Pro Bowl: defensive linemen Joe Greene (future Pro Football Hall of Fame player) and L. C. Greenwood; future Hall of Fame linebackers Jack Ham and Jack Lambert; Andy Russell, the team's third starting linebacker; future Hall of Fame defensive back Mel Blount; and safeties Glen Edwards and Mike Wagner.

Greene made the Pro Bowl despite missing six games with injuries. Linebackers Ham and Lambert and cornerback Blount, who led the league with 11 interceptions and was named the NFL's Defensive Player of the Year, had the best seasons of their careers. Wagner had 4 interceptions and 3 fumble recoveries, while Edwards had 3 interceptions, while also returning 25 punts for 267 yards.

=== Playoffs ===
Dallas qualified for the NFC playoffs as the wild card team in part to a loss to the St. Louis Cardinals in Week 12 with the Cardinals finishing with an 11-3 record. In the playoffs, Dallas defeated the Minnesota Vikings, 17–14, with a 50-yard touchdown pass from Staubach to Drew Pearson with less than a minute to play in what was called the "Hail Mary pass". They went on to crush the Los Angeles Rams, 37–7, in the NFC Championship Game. As a result, the Cowboys became the first wild card team to advance to the Super Bowl.

In the AFC Playoffs, Pittsburgh's offense was uncharacteristically bad committing a total of 12 turnovers in their two playoff games. Despite the bad offensive play, the Steelers only gave up a combined total of 20 points in their victories over the Baltimore Colts in the AFC Divisional playoff game 28–10, and the Oakland Raiders in the AFC Championship Game 16–10.

=== Super Bowl pregame news and notes ===
Coming into Super Bowl X, most sports writers and fans expected Swann would not play. He had suffered a severe concussion in the AFC Championship Game against the Raiders which forced him to spend two days in a hospital. If he did play, many assumed he would just be used as a decoy to draw coverage away from the other receivers.

Throughout the week leading up to the Super Bowl, Swann was unable to participate in several team practices or was limited to only a minor workout in them. However, a few days before the game, he received a verbal challenge from Dallas safety Cliff Harris, who stated, "I'm not going to hurt anyone intentionally. But getting hit again while he's running a pass route must be in the back of Swann's mind. I know it would be in the back of my mind."

Swann responded "I'm still not 100 percent. I value my health, but I've had no dizzy spells. I read what Harris said. He was trying to intimidate me. He said I'd be afraid out there. He needn't worry. He doesn't know Lynn Swann. He can't scare me or the team. I said to myself, 'The hell with it, I'm gonna play.' Sure, I thought about the possibility of being reinjured. But it's like being thrown by a horse. You have to get up and ride again immediately or you may be scared the rest of your life."

Super Bowl X was the final NFL officiating assignment for veteran referee Norm Schachter, who also served as the referee for Super Bowl I and Super Bowl V. Schachter, one of six men to serve as referee for at least three Super Bowls, worked as an officiating supervisor and instant replay official following his on-field retirement. This was the first Super Bowl where penalties and other information were announced by the referee over a wireless microphone, an innovation of Cowboys general manager Tex Schramm which went into effect at the start of the 1975 season.

Super Bowl X was also the first Super Bowl where the starting placekickers were both soccer-style kickers: Roy Gerela for Pittsburgh and Toni Fritsch for Dallas.

This was the first Super Bowl to have the game's respective edition denoted on the field. It was located at the 35-yard line but only the roman numeral. Beginning the next year, the entire name of the year's Super Bowl would be on the 35 yard line. The NFL would do this up until Super Bowl XXXI where they placed the team's helmets at the 30-yard line and the Super Bowl logo at the 50 yard line. This practice would continue until Super Bowl XXXVII where it was retired immediately following the game. The NFL shield would return to the 50 yard line (in addition to placing the game's logo at the 25 yard line) the next year, where it has remained ever since.

== Broadcasting ==
CBS televised the game in the United States with play-by-play announcer Pat Summerall (calling his first Super Bowl in that role) and color commentator Tom Brookshier. Toward the end of the game, Hank Stram took over for Brookshier, who had left the booth to head down to the locker room area to conduct the postgame interviews with the winning team. Two days after the Super Bowl, Stram was hired as coach of the New Orleans Saints, interrupting his broadcasting career for two seasons. Pregame, halftime, and postgame coverage were provided by The NFL Today crew of Brent Musburger, Irv Cross and Phyllis George. During this game, CBS began using Jack Trombey's "Horizontal Hold" as the theme music. This would be used the following season for the NFL Today pregame show between 1976 and 1980 in its original form, with a remake for 1981 followed by updates for 1984 and 1989 (which would also be used from 1998 to 2002). The 1981 remake was used again in 2025 for the show's 50th anniversary celebration.

On radio, Ed Ingles and Jim Kelly called the game nationally for CBS Radio. Verne Lundquist and Al Wisk announced the game for the Dallas Cowboys Radio Network. Jack Fleming and Myron Cope called the game for the Pittsburgh Steelers Radio Network.

CBS's Super Bowl lead-out program was coverage of the final round of the Phoenix Open, joined in progress.

== Entertainment ==
Each player wore the Bicentennial logo on their jerseys

The overall theme of the Super Bowl entertainment was to celebrate the United States Bicentennial. Each Cowboys and Steelers player wore a special patch with the Bicentennial logo on their jerseys.

This was the first Super Bowl where somebody other than the game's referee tossed the coin, in this case, John Warner who was the United States Secretary of the Navy from 1972 to 1974. Prior to 1976, the coin toss was held a half-hour before kick-off.

The performance event group Up with People performed during both the pregame festivities and the halftime show titled "200 Years and Just a Baby: A Tribute to America's Bicentennial". Up with People dancers portrayed various American historical figures along with a rendition of Steve Goodman's "City of New Orleans". Singer Tom Sullivan sang the national anthem.

Scenes for the 1977 suspense film Black Sunday, about a fictional terrorist attack on the Super Bowl via the Goodyear Blimp, were filmed during the game.

This was the last Super Bowl to kick off as early as 2:00 p.m. (EST), thereby allowing a finish time before the commencement of many of the nation's evening church services.

This was the first Super Bowl where the play clock was visible to teams and spectators. Visible play clocks were mandated by NFL rules beginning with the 1976 season.

This was the last Super Bowl where the coin toss was conducted 30 minutes prior to kickoff. Beginning with the next season, the official coin toss was moved to three minutes before kickoff in the center of the field, leaving coaches to scramble to put the proper specialty unit on the field. From 1947 to 1975, a "mock toss" was held three minutes prior to kickoff at midfield to inform fans and media of the result.

== Game summary ==
The Steelers won their second straight Super Bowl, largely through the plays by Swann and by stopping a rally by the Cowboys late in the fourth quarter. Officials did not call a single penalty on the Steelers during the game, while the Cowboys were called for only 2 penalties for 20 yards.

=== First quarter ===
On the opening kickoff, the Cowboys ran a reverse play where linebacker Thomas "Hollywood" Henderson took a handoff from running back/kick returner Preston Pearson and returned the ball a Super Bowl-record 48 yards before Steelers kicker Roy Gerela forced him out of bounds at the Steelers' 44-yard line. Gerela suffered badly bruised ribs which appeared to affect his kicking performance all afternoon. On the first play of the game, Steelers defensive end L. C. Greenwood strip-sacked Cowboys quarterback Roger Staubach. Although Dallas center John Fitzgerald recovered the fumble, they eventually were forced to punt. The sack was a foreshadow of things to come for Staubach, who was sacked seven times during the game. The Steelers managed to get one first down and advanced to their own 40-yard line, but then they too were forced to punt. Steelers punter Bobby Walden fumbled the snap and managed to recover it, but Dallas took over on the Steelers' 29-yard line. On the very next play, Staubach threw a 29-yard touchdown pass to wide receiver Drew Pearson, taking a 7–0 lead. The score was the first touchdown allowed in the first quarter by the Steelers' defense in 1975.

Instead of trying to immediately tie the game on a long passing play, the Steelers ran the ball on the first four plays of their ensuing possession, and then quarterback Terry Bradshaw completed a 32-yard pass to wide receiver Lynn Swann to reach the Cowboys' 16-yard line. Swann soared over the outstretched reach of cornerback Mark Washington before tightroping the sideline to make the reception. Two running plays further advanced the ball to the 7-yard line. Then on 3rd-and-1, the Steelers ran a trick play to score. Pittsburgh brought in three tight ends, which usually signals a running play (Steelers guard Gerry Mullins was also an eligible receiver on the play as he moved to the tight end position). After the snap, tight end Randy Grossman faked a block to the inside as if it were a running play, but then ran a pass route into the end zone, and Bradshaw threw the ball to him for a 7-yard touchdown, tying the game, 7–7. This marked the first Super Bowl where both teams scored in the first quarter.

=== Second quarter ===
Dallas responded on their next drive, advancing the ball 51 yards, all rushing, (30 of them on five carries from fullback Robert Newhouse) before incurring a third down false start penalty on offensive tackle Ralph Neely, and scoring on kicker Toni Fritsch's 36-yard field goal to take a 10–7 lead early in the second quarter. The 51 rushing yards the Cowboys amassed on the drive tripled what the Minnesota Vikings gained against Pittsburgh for all of Super Bowl IX. The Steelers subsequently advanced to the Cowboys' 36-yard line on their next possession, during which Bradshaw completed a 12-yard pass to wide receiver John Stallworth, who then appeared to fumble the ball while getting tackled by safety Cliff Harris, but the officials ruled him down before the ball came loose. Two plays later, however, on 4th-and-1, Bradshaw's pass to running back Franco Harris was broken up by Cliff Harris, turning the ball over on downs.

After an exchange of punts, Dallas drove to the Pittsburgh 20-yard line from their own 48, aided by a 14-yard reception by running back Charley Young. However, in three plays, they lost 25 yards. On first down, Newhouse was tackled for a 3-yard loss by linebacker Andy Russell. Then Greenwood sacked Staubach for a 12-yard loss. And on third down, Staubach was sacked again, this time for a 10-yard loss, by defensive end Dwight White. The sacks pushed Dallas out of field goal range, forcing them to punt. The Steelers' offense got the ball back on their own 6-yard line with 3:47 left in the half. On the drive, Bradshaw completed a 53-yard pass to Swann to advance the ball to the Cowboys' 37-yard line; Swann's catch has become one of the most memorable acrobatic catches in Super Bowl history. On the very next play, Bradshaw just missed a connection with Swann at the Dallas 6 (although CBS's Pat Summerall thought the incomplete pass was intended for Stallworth). Pittsburgh drove to the 19-yard line after the two-minute warning, but the drive stalled there and ended with no points after Gerela missed a game-tying 36-yard field goal attempt wide left with 22 seconds remaining in the period.

=== Third quarter ===
After Pittsburgh punted to start the second half, they got a great scoring opportunity when cornerback J. T. Thomas intercepted a pass from Staubach intended for Cowboys wide receiver Golden Richards and returned it 35 yards to the Dallas 25-yard line. However, once again the Steelers failed to score as the Dallas defense kept Pittsburgh out of the end zone and Gerela missed his second field goal attempt, a 33-yarder, wide left. After the miss, Cliff Harris mockingly patted Gerela on his helmet and thanked him for "helping Dallas out". Gerela grabbed Harris and began engaging him verbally, but Steelers linebacker Jack Lambert, who blocked on field goals and was standing nearby, grabbed Harris and threw him to the ground in defense of Gerela. Lambert could have been ejected from the game for defending his teammate, but the officials decided to allow him to remain. The third quarter was completely scoreless and the Cowboys maintained their 10–7 lead going into the final period.

=== Fourth quarter ===
Early in the fourth quarter, Dallas punter Mitch Hoopes was forced to punt from inside his own 5-yard line. As Hoopes stepped up to make the kick, Pittsburgh running back Reggie Harrison broke through the line and blocked the punt. The ball went through the back of the end zone for a safety, cutting the Dallas lead to 10–9. It was the second safety recorded in Super Bowl history, the first occurring in Super Bowl IX the year before, which was also scored by the Steelers when White downed Minnesota Vikings quarterback Fran Tarkenton on a fumble recovery in the end zone. Then Steelers running back Mike Collier returned the free kick 25 yards to the Cowboys' 45-yard line. Dallas halted the ensuing drive at the 20-yard line, but this time Gerela successfully kicked a 36-yard field goal to give Pittsburgh their first lead of the game, 12–10. Then on the first play of the Cowboys' next drive, Steelers safety Mike Wagner intercepted a pass from Staubach and returned it 19 yards to the Dallas 7-yard line before getting tackled by Neely. Wagner's interception came off the same play Dallas used to score their opening touchdown. Instead of surveying the middle of the field, Wagner watched Pearson and recognized the pattern. Staubach later said: "It was our bread and butter play all season long. It was the first time it didn't work." The Cowboys' defense again managed to prevent a touchdown, but Gerela kicked an 18-yard field goal to increase the Steelers' lead to 15–10.

The Steelers forced a punt and regained possession of the ball on their own 30-yard line with 4:25 left in the game, giving them a chance to either increase their lead or run out the clock to win the game. But after two plays, the Steelers found themselves facing 3rd-and-4 on their own 36-yard line. Assuming that the Cowboys would be expecting a short pass or a run, Bradshaw decided to try a long pass and told Swann in the huddle to run a deep post pattern. As Bradshaw dropped back to pass, Cliff Harris and linebacker D. D. Lewis both blitzed in an attempt to sack him, but Bradshaw managed to dodge Lewis and throw the ball just before being leveled by Harris and defensive tackle Larry Cole, who landed a helmet-to-helmet hit on Bradshaw. Swann then caught the ball at the 5-yard line and ran into the end zone for a 64-yard touchdown reception. Bradshaw never did see Swann's catch or the touchdown since Cole's hit to Bradshaw's helmet knocked him out of the game with a head injury. It was only after he was assisted to the locker room that he was told what happened.

After play resumed, Gerela's extra point attempt hit the left upright, but the Steelers now had a 21–10 lead with 3:02 left in the game. Despite the two-score margin, the game was not quite over in favor of the Steelers yet.

Staubach then led the Cowboys with 80 yards in 5 plays on their ensuing drive, which featured key receptions by both Pearsons: a 31-yarder at the Pittsburgh 43 by Drew and a 9-yarder at the 34 by Preston. The drive ended with Staubach's 34-yard touchdown pass to wide receiver Percy Howard (who had replaced injured starter Golden Richards earlier in the quarter), cutting the Cowboys' deficit to 21–17 with 1:48 remaining (Howard's touchdown reception was the only catch of his NFL career; he was not mentioned by name by John Facenda in the highlight package produced by NFL Films, nor was he named in the Cowboys' season highlights film, also narrated by Facenda. However, he was named by Harry Kalas in the NFL Game of the Week highlight package produced later that week.) After Mullins recovered Dallas' onside kick attempt, the Steelers, now led by backup quarterback Terry Hanratty, then tried to run out the clock on the next drive with four straight running plays, but the Cowboys' defense stopped them on fourth down at the Dallas 39. In the process of doing so, Dallas used up all of their timeouts and got one more chance to mount a game-winning drive with 1:22 remaining. Some questioned why Noll would elect to go for it on fourth down but as later explained by NFL Films, his entire kicking game had been suspect all game long with Gerela missing an extra point and two field goals while Walden fumbled a snap on a punt, and nearly had two punts blocked. (Gerela's problems may have begun on the opening kickoff when he was forced to make a touchdown saving tackle on Henderson.)

Staubach started out the drive with an 11-yard scramble to midfield, and then followed it up with a 12-yard completion to Preston Pearson at the Steelers' 38-yard line. Pearson inexplicably ran towards the middle rather than running out of bounds to stop the clock. On the next play, Staubach could not handle a low snap, but managed to recover the ball and throw it downfield for an incompletion. On second down with 12 seconds left, he threw a pass intended for Howard in the end zone, but the ball bounced off Howard's helmet and a Hail Mary replay was not to be. Had Howard positioned himself inches back from his position in the end zone as the ball came down, he would have had a better opportunity to catch the ball and write himself into Cowboy folklore. Then on third down with three seconds left, Staubach once again tried to complete a Hail Mary pass to Howard in the end zone, but the ball was tipped by Wagner into the arms of safety Glen Edwards for an interception, sealing Pittsburgh's second consecutive Super Bowl victory.

Bradshaw finished the game with 9 out of 19 pass completions for 209 yards and two touchdowns, with no interceptions. He also added another 16 yards rushing the ball. Staubach completed 15 out of 24 passes for 204 yards and two touchdowns with three interceptions. He also rushed for 22 yards on five carries but was sacked seven times. It was the first Super Bowl where every touchdown was scored on a pass play. Since then, only three other Super Bowls, XV, LVI, and LVIII have had all their touchdowns scored on passes. Steelers fullback Franco Harris was the leading rusher of the game with 82 rushing yards, and also caught a pass for 26 yards. Newhouse was the Cowboys top rusher with 56 yards and caught two passes for 12 yards. Greenwood recorded a Super Bowl record four sacks, but it has gone unrecognized since the NFL didn't officially record sacks until 1982.

== Aftermath ==
The game was remembered for being the most exciting of the first 10 Super Bowl games. Swann's heroics and Lambert's 14 tackles and throw-down of Cliff Harris are the indelible images from the game. After being benched to start the 1974 campaign and being booed for most of his first four seasons in Pittsburgh, Bradshaw became the first quarterback to throw two game-winning touchdown passes in Super Bowl competition. The Steelers' bid for three-consecutive championships ended in a 24–7 loss to the Oakland Raiders in the 1976 AFC Championship game after a season that saw Pittsburgh's defense shut out five opponents and allow only 28 points in a 9-game span. The loss to Pittsburgh coupled with an early playoff exit in 1976 largely influenced the Cowboys to draft Tony Dorsett in the 1977 Draft to help infuse life into Dallas' offense. Dorsett helped lead Dallas to a Super Bowl XII victory over the Denver Broncos, who defeated the Steelers in the first round of the playoffs that year.

Pittsburgh and Dallas would battle in another thriller in Super Bowl XIII (also played in Miami). The result was the same, as the Steelers prevailed 35–31. But Super Bowl X was the game that began the rivalry between the two franchises. The Cowboys gained a measure of revenge by defeating the Steelers 27–17 in Super Bowl XXX following the 1995 season.

This was the final football game to be played on artificial turf (specifically, Poly-Turf) at the Orange Bowl. The surface in 1976 reverted to natural grass, and remained so until the stadium's closure in 2007. Poly-Turf was first installed at the Orange Bowl in 1970 and replaced in 1972, but players complained often of the slickness, and it discolored due to the intense sunshine of south Florida. This was the last Super Bowl played outdoors on artificial turf for 38 years, until Super Bowl XLVIII at MetLife Stadium (infilled FieldTurf) in February 2014.

=== Box score ===
Super Bowl X: Pittsburgh Steelers 21, Dallas Cowboys 17

Quarter	1	2	3	4	Total
Cowboys (NFC)	7	3	0	7	17
Steelers (AFC)	7	0	0	14	21

at Orange Bowl, Miami, Florida

- Date: January 18, 1976
- Game time: 2:14 p.m. EST
- Game weather: 57 °F (14 °C), clear

Scoring summary

Quarter	Time	Drive			Team	Scoring information	Score	
Quarter	Time	Plays	Yards	TOP	Team	Scoring information	DAL	PIT
1	10:24	1	29	:08	DAL	Drew Pearson 29-yard touchdown reception from Roger Staubach, Toni Fritsch kick good	7	0
1	5:57	8	67	4:27	PIT	Randy Grossman 7-yard touchdown reception from Terry Bradshaw, Roy Gerela kick good	7	7
2	14:45	11	46	6:12	DAL	36-yard field goal by Fritsch	10	7
4	11:28	—	—	—	PIT	Mitch Hoopes punt blocked through the end zone by Reggie Harrison for a safety	10	9
4	8:41	6	25	2:47	PIT	36-yard field goal by Gerela	10	12
4	6:37	3	6	1:45	PIT	18-yard field goal by Gerela	10	15
4	3:02	3	70	1:23	PIT	Lynn Swann 64-yard touchdown reception from Bradshaw, Gerela kick no good (hit left upright)	10	21
4	1:48	5	80	1:14	DAL	Percy Howard 34-yard touchdown reception from Staubach, Fritsch kick good	17	21
"TOP" = time of possession. For other American football terms, see Glossary of American football.							17	21

== Final statistics ==
Sources: NFL.com Super Bowl X, Super Bowl X Play Finder Pit, Super Bowl X Play Finder Dal

=== Statistical comparison ===
	Dallas Cowboys	Pittsburgh Steelers
First downs	14	13
First downs rushing	6	7
First downs passing	8	6
First downs penalty	0	0
Third down efficiency	3/14	8/19
Fourth down efficiency	1/1	0/3
Net yards rushing	108	149
Rushing attempts	31	46
Yards per rush	3.5	3.2
Passing – Completions/attempts	15/24	9/19
Times sacked-total yards	7–42	2–19
Interceptions thrown	3	0
Net yards passing	162	190
Total net yards	270	339
Punt returns-total yards	1–5	5–31
Kickoff returns-total yards	4–96	4–89
Interceptions-total return yards	0–0	3–89
Punts-average yardage	7–35	4–39.8
Fumbles-lost	4–0	4–0
Penalties-total yards	2–20	0–0
Time of possession	30:30	29:30
Turnovers	3	0

=== Individual statistics ===
Cowboys passing
	C/ATT^{1}	Yds	TD	INT	Rating
Roger Staubach	15/24	204	2	3	77.8
Cowboys rushing
	Car^{2}	Yds	TD	LG^{3}	Yds/Car
Robert Newhouse	16	56	0	16	3.50
Roger Staubach	5	22	0	11	4.40
Doug Dennison	5	16	0	5	3.20
Preston Pearson	5	14	0	9	2.80
Cowboys receiving
	Rec^{4}	Yds	TD	LG^{3}	Target^{5}
Preston Pearson	5	53	0	14	7
Charley Young	3	31	0	14	3
Drew Pearson	2	59	1	30	5
Robert Newhouse	2	12	0	8	3
Percy Howard	1	34	1	34	2
Jean Fugett	1	9	0	9	2
Doug Dennison	1	6	0	6	1
Golden Richards	0	0	0	0	1

Steelers passing
	C/ATT^{1}	Yds	TD	INT	Rating
Terry Bradshaw	9/19	209	2	0	122.5
Steelers rushing
	Car^{2}	Yds	TD	LG^{3}	Yds/Car
Franco Harris	27	82	0	11	3.04
Rocky Bleier	15	51	0	8	3.40
Terry Bradshaw	4	16	0	8	4.00
Steelers receiving
	Rec^{4}	Yds	TD	LG^{3}	Target^{5}
Lynn Swann	4	161	1	64	7
John Stallworth	2	8	0	13	6
Franco Harris	1	26	0	26	2
Larry Brown	1	7	0	7	3
Randy Grossman	1	7	1	7	1

^{1}Completions/attempts ^{2}Carries ^{3}Long gain ^{4}Receptions ^{5}Times targeted

=== Records set ===
The following records were set in Super Bowl X, according to the official NFL.com boxscore, the 2016 NFL Record & Fact Book and the ProFootball reference.com game summary.
Some records have to meet NFL minimum number of attempts to be recognized. The minimums are shown (in parentheses).

Player records set
Passing records
Highest passer rating, game	122.5	Terry Bradshaw (Pittsburgh)
Most touchdown passes, career	4	Roger Staubach (Dallas)
Rushing records
Most attempts, career	61	Franco Harris (Pittsburgh)
Receiving records
Most yards, game	161	Lynn Swann (Pittsburgh)
Highest average gain, game (3 receptions)	40.3 yards (4–161)	Lynn Swann (Pittsburgh)
Combined yardage records ^{†}
Most attempts, career	64	Franco Harris
Most yards gained, game	161	Lynn Swann
Fumbles
Most fumbles, game	3	Roger Staubach
Most fumbles, career	3	Roger Staubach; Franco Harris
Defense
Most sacks, game ^{‡}	4	L. C. Greenwood (Pittsburgh)
Special Teams
Longest kickoff return	48 yards	Thomas Henderson (Dallas)
Most kickoff returns, career	7	Preston Pearson (Dallas)
Records tied
Most touchdown passes, game	2	Roger Staubach; Terry Bradshaw
Most interceptions thrown, game	3	Roger Staubach
Most fumbles recovered, game	2	Roger Staubach
Most fumbles recovered, career	2	Franco Harris; Roger Staubach; Bobby Walden (Pittsburgh)
Most safeties, game	1	Reggie Harrison (Pittsburgh)
Most kickoff returns, game	4	Preston Pearson
Most fair catches, game	3	Golden Richards (Dallas)
Most field goals attempted, career	5	Roy Gerela (Pittsburgh)

- † This category includes rushing, receiving, interception returns, punt returns, kickoff returns, and fumble returns.
- ‡ Sacks an official statistic since Super Bowl XVII by the NFL. Sacks are listed as "Tackled Attempting to Pass" in the official NFL box score for Super Bowl X.

Team records set
Points
Most points, fourth quarter	14	Steelers
Passing
Most times sacked	7	Cowboys
Defense
Most sacks made	7	Steelers
Records tied
Most Super Bowl victories	2	Steelers
Most consecutive Super Bowl victories	2	Steelers
Most points scored in any quarter of play	14 (4th)	Steelers
Most safeties, game	1	Steelers
Fewest penalties, game	0	Steelers
Fewest yards penalized, game	0	Steelers
Fewest turnovers, game	0	Steelers
Most punt returns, game	5	Steelers
Fewest rushing touchdowns	0	Cowboys; Steelers
Most passing touchdowns	2	Cowboys; Steelers
Fewest first downs penalty	0	Cowboys; Steelers
Most fumbles recovered, game	4	Cowboys; Steelers
Most touchdowns, losing team	2	Cowboys

Turnovers are defined as the number of times losing the ball on interceptions and fumbles.

Records set, both team totals
	Total	Steelers	Cowboys
Points
Most points, fourth quarter	21	14	7
Rushing
Fewest rushing touchdowns	0	0	0
Passing
Most passing touchdowns	4	2	2
Fumbles
Most fumbles	8	4	4
Penalties
Fewest penalties, game	2	0	2
Records tied
Most points, first quarter	14	7	7
Fewest first downs, penalty	0	0	0
Most times sacked	9	2	7
Fewest fumbles lost	0	0	0

== Starting lineups ==
Hall of Fame‡

Dallas	Position	Pittsburgh
Offense
Golden Richards	WR	John Stallworth‡
Ralph Neely	LT	Jon Kolb
Burton Lawless	LG	Jim Clack
John Fitzgerald	C	Ray Mansfield
Blaine Nye	RG	Gerry Mullins
Rayfield Wright‡	RT	Gordon Gravelle
Jean Fugett	TE	Larry Brown
Drew Pearson‡	WR	Lynn Swann‡
Roger Staubach‡	QB	Terry Bradshaw‡
Preston Pearson	RB	Franco Harris‡
Robert Newhouse	RB	Rocky Bleier
Defense
Ed "Too Tall" Jones	LE	L. C. Greenwood
Jethro Pugh	LT	Joe Greene‡
Larry Cole	RT	Ernie Holmes
Harvey Martin	RE	Dwight White
Dave Edwards	LLB	Jack Ham‡
Lee Roy Jordan	MLB	Jack Lambert‡
D. D. Lewis	RLB	Andy Russell
Mark Washington	LCB	J. T. Thomas
Mel Renfro‡	RCB	Mel Blount‡
Charlie Waters	LS	Mike Wagner
Cliff Harris‡	RS	Glen Edwards

== Officials ==
- Referee: Norm Schachter #56 third Super Bowl (I, V)
- Umpire: Joe Connell #57 second Super Bowl (VI)
- Head linesman: Leo Miles #35 second Super Bowl (VIII)
- Line judge: Jack Fette #39 third Super Bowl (V, VIII)
- Back judge: Stan Javie #29 third Super Bowl (II, VIII)
- Field judge: Bill O'Brien #83 first Super Bowl
- Alternates Bob Frederic #71 and Gordon McCarter #48 (neither officiated a Super Bowl on the field)

This was the first Super Bowl in which the referee wore a wireless microphone to announce penalties and other rulings to the audience in the stadium, those listening on radio and those watching on television. The idea was pioneered by Cowboys GM Tex Schramm.

Norm Schachter retired following this game and became an officiating supervisor. He became the first official to serve as referee for three Super Bowls, a mark later equaled by Jim Tunney, Pat Haggerty, Bob McElwee, Terry McAulay, Carl Cheffers and Bill Vinovich, and surpassed by Jerry Markbreit with four.

Note: A seven-official system was not used until 1978
