= Dirty Dozen (American football) =

1975 Dallas Cowboys rookies

The Dirty Dozen were the rookies that made the Dallas Cowboys team in 1975. These players were credited with helping the Cowboys advance to Super Bowl X and were a key foundation of the team's success during the latter half of the 1970s going into the early 1980s, as by 1979 many of these players would have replaced many of the Cowboys' aging starters of the 1960s. The rookies came up with the nickname inspired by the film of the same name, and spent half of the season without shaving.

== List of the rookies ==
- Randy White, a Hall of Fame defensive tackle (originally middle linebacker). He was named to nine consecutive All-Pro and Pro Bowl teams along with being named to the NFL 1980s All-Decade Team.
- Thomas "Hollywood" Henderson, an outside linebacker who replaced Dave Edwards after Super Bowl X. He was a one-time Pro Bowler
- Bob Breunig, middle linebacker who succeeded Lee Roy Jordan at the position following Jordan's retirement in 1976. He was a four-time All-Pro and a three-time Pro Bowler.
- Pat Donovan, offensive tackle who succeeded Ralph Neely at the left tackle position following Neely's retirement after Super Bowl XII. Started Super Bowl XII at right tackle in place of future Hall of Famer Rayfield Wright. Formed what was known as the "Irish Triumvirate" with guard Tom Rafferty and center John Fitzgerald. He was a four-time Pro Bowler.
- Herbert Scott, a guard (replaced Blaine Nye after Nye's retirement in 1976). He was a two-time All-Pro and a three-time Pro Bowler
- Mitch Hoopes, a punter
- Percy Howard, a wide receiver best known for his only career catch being for a touchdown in Super Bowl X
- Randy Hughes, a safety
- Scott Laidlaw, a running back
- Burton Lawless, a guard
- Kyle Davis, a center
- Rolly Woolsey, a defensive back

== Legacy ==
For all of the accolades that the Dallas Cowboys scouting department had received throughout the years, the team had never kept more than nine draft choices and the average number was six. In 1962, 14 rookies made the team - 7 draft choices, 4 undrafted free agents, 2 obtained in trades and one claimed off waivers.

In 1975, eleven picks and one undrafted free agent (Percy Howard) made the team, hence the nickname "The Dirty Dozen" for the 1975 Cowboys draft class. This group of rookies didn't even include linebacker Mike Hegman, who was drafted that year but did not enter the NFL until 1976, nor future Seattle Seahawks starting quarterback undrafted free agent Jim Zorn who made the team, but was later cut to make room for running back Preston Pearson, who had been waived by the Pittsburgh Steelers.

The infusion of new talent not only meant an immediate rebuilding process and competition, but also changed the course of the team in a significant way. This group helped the Cowboys reach Super Bowl X that season, and moving forward would play a key role in the franchise being given the nickname "America's Team".

This draft class is considered to be one of the greatest in NFL history.
