= Scott Laidlaw =

American football player (1953–2026)

No. 35, 33
- Position: Running back

Personal information
- Born: February 17, 1953; Hawthorne, California, U.S.
- Died: January 29, 2026 (aged 72)
- Listed height: 6 ft 0 in (1.83 m)
- Listed weight: 206 lb (93 kg)

Career information
- High school: Hawthorne
- College: Stanford
- NFL draft: 1975: 14th round, 356th overall pick

Career history
- Dallas Cowboys (1975–1979); New York Giants (1980)

Awards and highlights
- Super Bowl champion (XII); Second-team All-Pac-8 (1974)

Career NFL statistics
- Rushing attempts: 255
- Rushing yards: 1,007
- Rushing touchdowns: 9
- Stats at Pro Football Reference

Robert Scott Laidlaw (February 17, 1953 – January 29, 2026) was an American professional football player who was a running back in the National Football League (NFL) for the Dallas Cowboys and New York Giants. He played college football for the Stanford Cardinal and was selected by the Cowboys in the 14th round of the 1975 NFL draft.

== Early life ==
Laidlaw attended Hawthorne High School. He accepted a football scholarship from Stanford University. As a sophomore backup, he averaged 5.6 yards per carry, rushing 48 times for 268 yards.

As a junior, he was named the starter at fullback, leading the team in rushing with 639 yards and four touchdowns, while making 19 catches for 155 yards and one receiving touchdown. The next year he led the team again in rushing with 636 yards and four touchdowns, also posting 14 catches for 135 yards and one receiving touchdown.

He finished fourth in the school career rushing list, with 1,543 rushing yards (4.4-yard average), while playing on pass-oriented offenses. He also had 40 receptions for 351 yards.

== Professional career ==
=== Dallas Cowboys ===
Laidlaw was selected by the Dallas Cowboys in the fourteenth round (356th overall) of the 1975 NFL draft, also known as the Dirty Dozen draft. As a rookie, he was used mainly in short yardage situations, until suffering a mid season knee injury that placed him on the injured reserve list. His running style reminded the media and observers of Walt Garrison.

In 1976, he replaced an injured Robert Newhouse in the season opener against the Philadelphia Eagles, rushing for 104 yards on 19 carries, along with seven receptions for 66 yards. He missed three games with severe rib bruises he suffered against the Baltimore Colts and his return was also hindered by a bout with the flu. Against the Atlanta Falcons he rushed for 88 yards on 15 carries. He finished with 424 rushing yards (third on the team), 325 receiving yards (third on the team) and 84 scored points (fourth on the team).

In 1977, he suffered a hamstring pull in training camp which limited his preseason action and kept him from seriously competing for the starting fullback job with Newhouse. As a backup that was used mainly on passing situations, he made just five receptions for 15 yards and nine carries for 60 yards. He was a part of the Super Bowl XII winning team.

In 1978, an injury to Newhouse late in the season allowed him to become an important contributor in the final push toward a second straight Super Bowl appearance. Against the Washington Redskins on Thanksgiving he had 16 carries for 122 yards and two touchdowns, including 103 first-half rushing yards and a 59-yard run to set up a field goal. Two weeks later against the Philadelphia Eagles, he scored on a 44-yard screen pass reception and on a one-yard run. In the first-round playoff game against the Atlanta Falcons, he had 17 carries for 66 yards and two touchdowns. The following week in the conference championship game against the Los Angeles Rams, he had a four-yard scoring reception that put the Cowboys ahead 14–0 in the fourth quarter. Laidlaw ended up scoring 7 touchdowns in the 6 games prior to Super Bowl XIII.

In 1979, he was set to contend with Newhouse for the starting fullback job, but Laidlaw suffered a pulled hamstring in training camp and was unable to make a serious challenge. After Newhouse was limited with a leg injury he sustained in the season opener, he and Laidlaw were used as interchangeable play messengers during the first half of the season. Laidlaw could never regain his full strength however, because of a cyst he had behind his left knee that was removed until the offseason.

On August 26, 1980, he was released after being passed on the depth chart by rookie Timmy Newsome. During his time with the Cowboys, although his effectiveness was limited by a series of injuries, he still managed to be a key backup and a part of three Super Bowl teams.

=== New York Giants ===
On September 8, 1980, he was signed as a free agent by the New York Giants, where he played mainly on special teams. He asked for and was given his release on October 31.

== Death ==
Laidlaw died on January 29, 2026, at the age of 72.

== NFL career statistics ==
Legend
	Won the Super Bowl
**Bold**	Career high

=== Regular season ===
Year	Team	Games		Rushing					Receiving				
Year	Team	GP	GS	Att	Yds	Avg	Lng	TD	Rec	Yds	Avg	Lng	TD
1975	DAL	8	0	3	10	3.3	10	0	11	100	9.1	25	0
1976	DAL	13	**7**	**94**	**424**	**4.5**	28	**3**	**38**	**325**	8.6	26	**1**
1977	DAL	14	0	9	15	1.7	8	0	5	60	12.0	18	**1**
1978	DAL	**16**	4	75	312	4.2	**59**	**3**	6	108	**18.0**	**44**	**1**
1979	DAL	**16**	4	69	236	3.4	15	**3**	12	59	4.9	12	0
1980	NYG	7	1	5	10	2.0	3	0	2	16	8.0	10	0
Total		74	16	255	1,007	3.9	59	9	74	668	9.0	44	3

=== Playoffs ===
Year	Team	Games		Rushing					Receiving				
Year	Team	GP	GS	Att	Yds	Avg	Lng	TD	Rec	Yds	Avg	Lng	TD
1976	DAL	1	0	2	2	1.0	1	1	0	0	0.0	0	0
1977	DAL	**3**	0	1	1	1.0	1	0	0	0	0.0	0	0
1978	DAL	**3**	**2**	**30**	**98**	**3.3**	**21**	**2**	**2**	**19**	**9.5**	**15**	**1**
Total		7	2	33	101	3.1	21	3	2	19	9.5	15	1
