= Larry Brinson =

American football player and coach (born 1954)

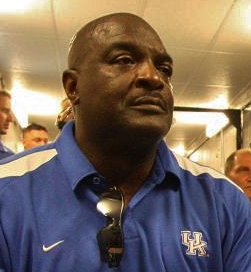
- Brinson visits the Kentucky Army National Guard in 2010

No. 36
- Position: Running back

Personal information
- Born: June 6, 1954 (age 72); Opa-locka, Florida, U.S.
- Listed height: 6 ft 0 in (1.83 m)
- Listed weight: 214 lb (97 kg)

Career information
- High school: Miami (FL) Northwestern
- College: Florida
- NFL draft: 1977: undrafted

Career history

Playing
- Dallas Cowboys (1977–1979); Seattle Seahawks (1980–1981)

Coaching
- Air Force (1983) Running backs coach; Arkansas (1984–1989) Running backs coach; Clemson (1990–1993) Running backs coach; Rice (1994–2005) Running backs coach; Kentucky (2007–2010) Running backs coach

Awards and highlights
- As player: Super Bowl champion (XII); As coach: Independence Bowl champion (1983); Holiday Bowl champion (1985); Hall of Fame Bowl champion (1990); Peach Bowl champion (1993); Music City Bowl champion (2007); Liberty Bowl champion (2008)

Career NFL statistics
- Rushing yards: 229
- Rushing average: 4.1
- Touchdowns: 4
- Stats at Pro Football Reference

Larry Sylvesta Brinson (born June 6, 1954) is a former American college football coach and a former football running back in the National Football League (NFL) for the Dallas Cowboys and Seattle Seahawks. He played college football at the University of Florida.

== Early life ==
Brinson was born in Opa-locka, Florida in 1954. He attended Miami Northwestern Senior High School, where he played football and also lettered in track.

== College career ==
Brinson accepted a football scholarship from the University of Florida in Gainesville, Florida, where he played for coach Doug Dickey's Florida Gators football team. In 1973, he became the starter at running back after Nat Moore sprained his foot and fractured his left tibia, but would lose playing time with a dislocated wrist that kept him out until the month of November.

He was named the starter at right halfback as a sophomore, but suffered a hip pointer injury and was relegated to a reserve role behind Tony Green, while rushing for 418 yards.

He would regain the starter position as a senior, spending time at right halfback and fullback, finishing his college career with 1,105 rushing yards on 240 carries, a 4.9 yards per carry average and 9 touchdowns. He played in four bowl games and graduated with a bachelor's degree

== Professional career ==
=== Dallas Cowboys ===
Brinson was signed as an undrafted free agent by the Dallas Cowboys after the 1977 NFL draft and made the team despite fracturing a cheekbone during training camp. As a rookie, he was the regular kickoff returner, tying for eighth in the NFC with 17 returns for an average of 24.1 yards.

In 1978, he was limited with a groin injury and had no pre-season action. He was waived on August 28, before being re-signed in October after Doug Dennison was injured. He appeared in 10 games and shared the kickoff return duties with Butch Johnson. His best game came in the 37–10 win against the Washington Redskins, where he ran for 51 yards on 4 carries, including a 39-yard touchdown run.

In 1979, he suffered a dislocated left shoulder on his first carry of the season opener against the St. Louis Cardinals. He missed the next 2 games and only had 14 carries for 48 yards during the season.

In 1980, he was switched from fullback to halfback in training camp. He was released on September first. During his time with the Cowboys he was a backup fullback and kickoff returner, including Super Bowl XII and Super Bowl XIII.

=== Seattle Seahawks ===
On September 3, 1980, Brinson was claimed off waivers by the Seattle Seahawks. He was seldom used, playing in 7 games and rushing for 57 yards on 16 carries. He was placed on the injured reserve list on August 17, 1981.

== Coaching career ==
After retiring from the NFL, Brinson became the running backs coach for head coach Ken Hatfield at the U.S. Air Force Academy in Colorado Springs, Colorado in 1983. Hatfield was a Florida Gators assistant coach when Brinson was a Gators running back. Hatfield's offensive scheme was run-oriented, emphasizing Brinson's area of expertise.

Brinson moved with Hatfield and became the running backs coach for the Arkansas Razorbacks at the University of Arkansas in Fayetteville, Arkansas (1984–89), the Clemson Tigers at Clemson University in Clemson, South Carolina (1990–93) and the Rice Owls at Rice University in Houston, Texas (1994–2005). In 2007, Brinson joined the Kentucky Wildcats coaching staff at the University of Kentucky in Lexington, Kentucky, also as running backs coach, and stayed in that position through the 2010 season.

== Personal life ==
Brinson has two daughters and a son.
