= Thomas Henderson (American football) =

American football player (born 1953)

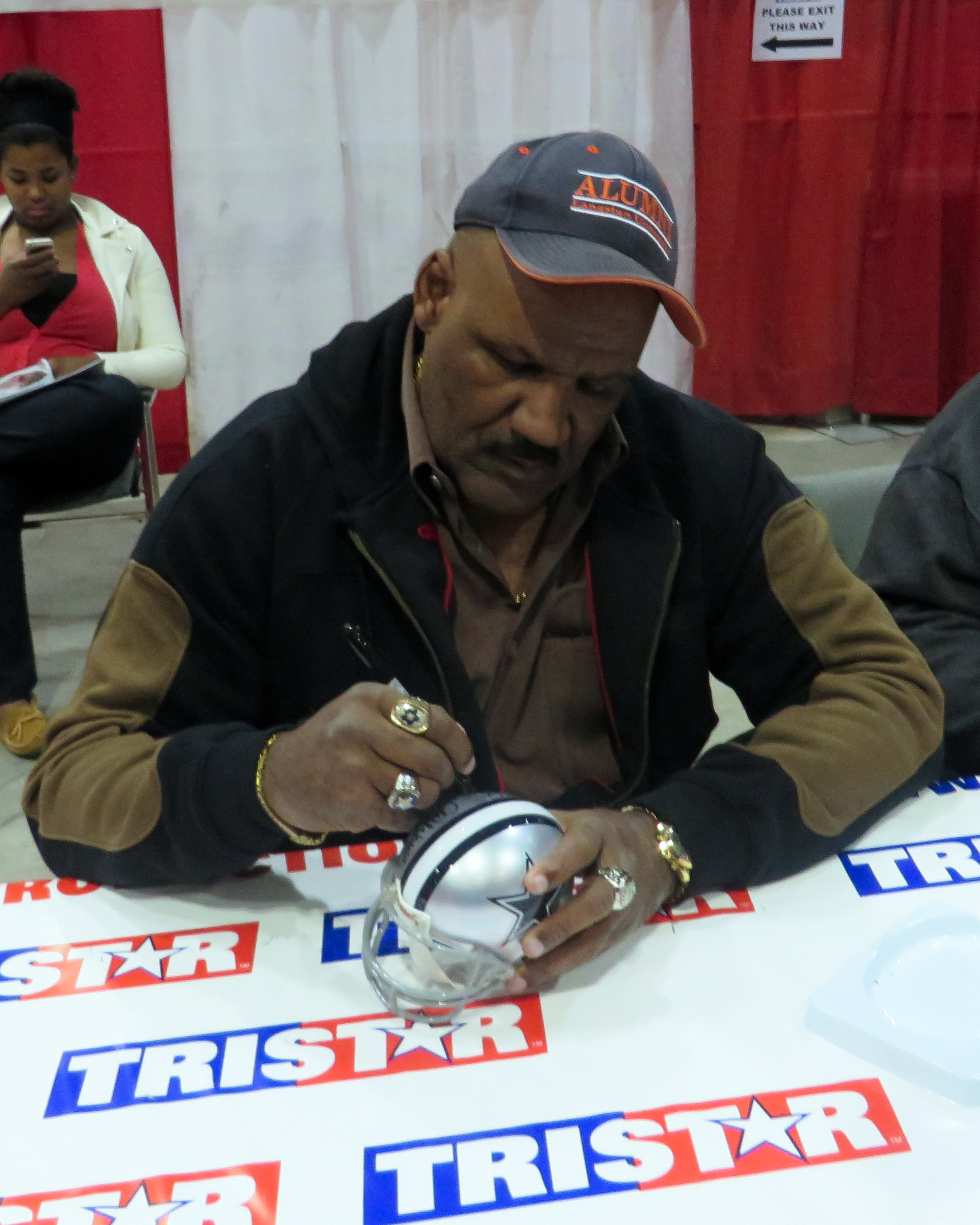
- Henderson signs autographs in Houston in 2014

No. 56, 50, 53
- Position: Linebacker

Personal information
- Born: March 1, 1953 (age 73); Austin, Texas, U.S.
- Listed height: 6 ft 2 in (1.88 m)
- Listed weight: 221 lb (100 kg)

Career information
- High school: Anderson (Austin) Douglass (Oklahoma City, Oklahoma)
- College: Langston
- NFL draft: 1975: 1st round, 18th overall pick

Career history
- Dallas Cowboys (1975–1979); San Francisco 49ers (1980); Houston Oilers (1980); Miami Dolphins (1981)

Awards and highlights
- Super Bowl champion (XII); Pro Bowl (1978); 2× NAIA All-American (1973, 1974); 2× Little All-American (1973, 1974); Southwest District Defensive Player of the Year (1974)

Career NFL statistics
- Games played: 75
- Interceptions: 5
- Touchdowns: 1
- Stats at Pro Football Reference

Thomas Henderson (born March 1, 1953), nicknamed "Hollywood", is an American former professional football player who was a linebacker in the National Football League (NFL) for the Dallas Cowboys, San Francisco 49ers, Houston Oilers, and Miami Dolphins. He played college football at Langston University.

== Early life ==
Henderson was raised by his teenage mother on the east side of Austin, Texas and played football for the L. C. Anderson High School "B" team until his sophomore year (1969), when he moved to Oklahoma City to live with his grandmother and find a more stable environment.

Although as a senior he earned All-City honors playing defensive end at Douglass High School, he was not recruited by colleges because his career had been shortened, after having to sit out his junior year after transferring. After graduation Henderson joined the Air Force, but quit before being sworn in.

== College career ==
Henderson was a walk-on for the football team at the NAIA Langston University. His personality earned him the nickname "Wild Man" and helped him become a two-time small-college All-American defensive end.

As a senior, he contributed to the team's 11–1 record and a playoff appearance. He was named Southwest district Defensive Player of the Year. He started 45 straight games in his college career. He also practiced track and field, competing in the 100-yard dash (9.5 seconds) and the triple jump (49 feet).

In 2002, he was inducted into the Langston University Athletic Hall of Fame. In 2018, he was inducted into the Black College Football Hall of Fame.

== Professional career ==
=== Dallas Cowboys ===
Henderson was selected in the first round (18th overall) of the 1975 NFL draft, as part of the Dallas Cowboys Dirty Dozen draft. As a rookie, he focused on special teams. He returned a reverse handoff for a 97-yard kickoff return for a touchdown (fourth in franchise history) during the second game against the St. Louis Cardinals. He blocked a punt in the fourteenth game against the New York Jets.

In 1976, he competed with D.D. Lewis for the starting strongside linebacker position. He remained as a backup and core special teams player. He blocked a punt out of the end zone for a safety in the twelfth game against the St. Louis Cardinals.

In 1977, he was named the starting strongside linebacker over Randy White, who was moved to defensive tackle. He posted 53 tackles, three interceptions, one sack (unofficial) and two fumble recoveries. He returned an interception for a 79-yard touchdown against the Tampa Bay Buccaneers. He also claimed that he introduced the crossbar slam dunk celebration into the NFL at the end of the play. He led the team with seven tackles in Super Bowl XII. Henderson gave himself the nickname "Hollywood" for his flamboyant play and high-visibility lifestyle.

In 1978, he couldn't start in three games because of an ankle injury. He returned an interception for a 68-yard touchdown (including a crossbar slam dunk) in the 28–0 NFC championship win against the Los Angeles Rams. Before Super Bowl XIII he started a war of words against the Pittsburgh Steelers, that ended up with him sharing a Newsweek magazine cover with quarterback Terry Bradshaw. He also pinned Bradshaw's arms, allowing linebacker Mike Hegman to steal the ball and run 37 yards for a touchdown in Super Bowl XIII. He was selected to the Pro Bowl at the end of the season.

Even though he had great potential as a player, Henderson's destructive lifestyle of drugs and alcohol began to catch up with him. During many games, he snorted liquid cocaine from an inhaler he hid in his pants. The final straw came in 1979, during the twelfth game against the Washington Redskins at RFK Stadium. While his team was being soundly beaten 34–20 on national television, Henderson mugged for the camera and displayed handkerchiefs with the Cowboys team logo. When interviewed about it, he blamed teammate Preston Pearson, saying that Pearson had asked him to show off the handkerchiefs, which Pearson was marketing, as a favor. Coach Tom Landry was so angered by the episode that after threatening to waive him, he instead deactivated Henderson for the remainder of the season by placing him on the reserve-retired list. According to sources close to the team, Landry did not intend for Henderson to ever play for the Cowboys again, even though the coach was still personally fond of Henderson.

=== San Francisco 49ers ===
On May 15, 1980, he was traded to the San Francisco 49ers in exchange for a fourth round draft choice (#91, Scott Pelluer). On September 19, he was waived after only playing one game. Henderson believed that 49ers coach Bill Walsh unloaded him because he suspected he was addicted to cocaine.

Henderson made the decision to ask for help for his cocaine addiction from the San Francisco 49ers team doctor; "I’m sick, Doc, I got a problem with cocaine. It's eating my nose up. It is keeping my wife up, I can't sleep. I need some profesional help but I don't know where to go, I don't know what to do." He told the team physician. After his visit with the doctor, Henderson alleged that the head coach Bill Walsh stopped talking to him which he said was out of character for their relationship.

Shortly afterward he and a 49ers team front office secretary were caught consuming cocaine while in a house set up with law enforcement surveillance and the secretary lost her job. The 49ers head coach talked to Henderson’s spouse who told the coach his drug history over the phone. As a result, Henderson was fired from the team. While eating breakfast on the morning of the next game 49ers director of player personnel John McVay called to let him know he was no longer wanted on the team and had been let go on waivers. Henderson was fired after asking the team doctor for help with his drug addiction.

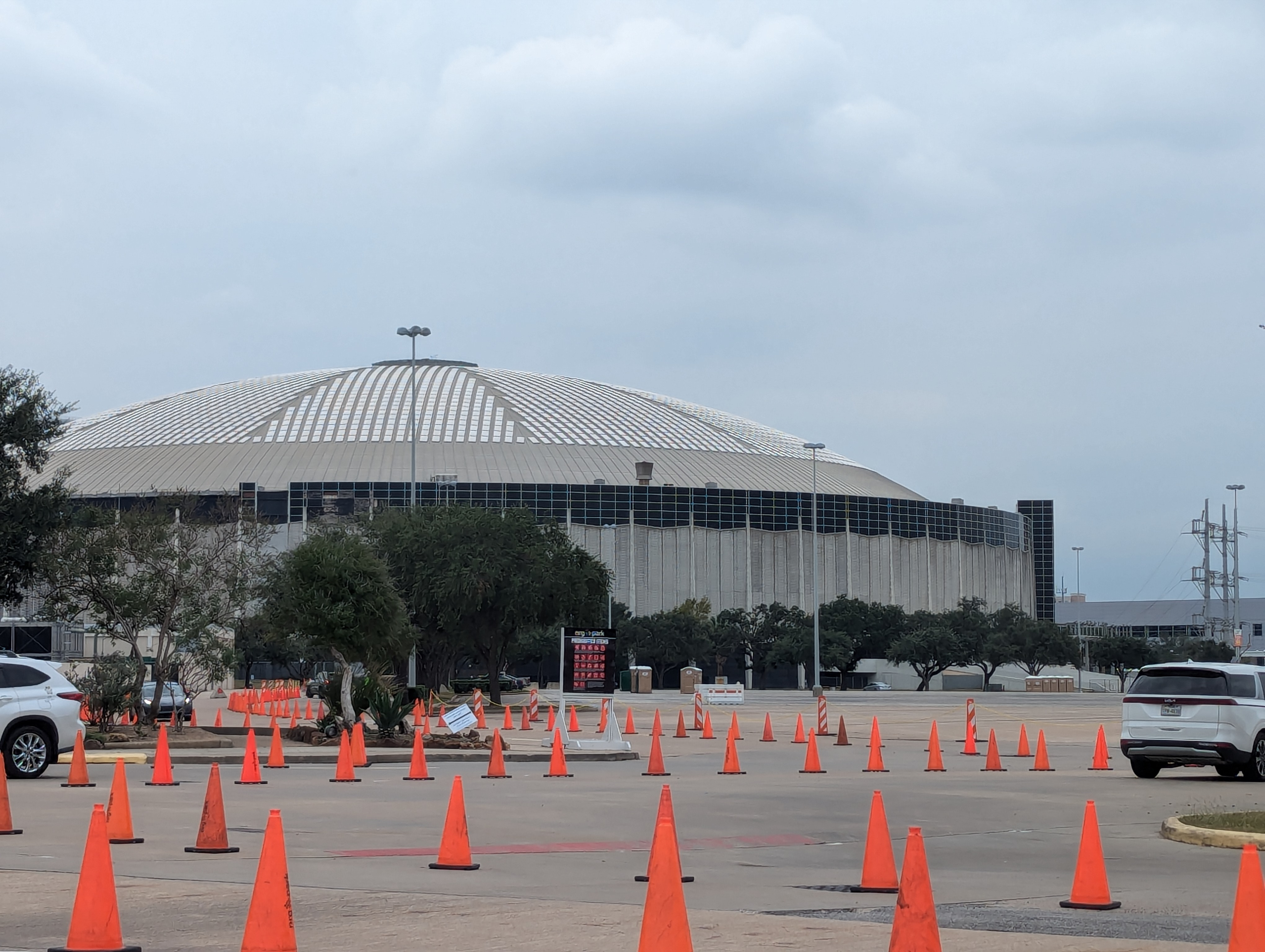
This is the Astrodome where Henderson played as a member of the Houston Oilers in 1980.

=== Houston Oilers ===
On September 24, 1980, he signed as a free agent with the Houston Oilers. He appeared in only six games because of a hamstring injury and played in the Oilers' playoff loss to the Oakland Raiders. He was not re-signed after the season.

=== Miami Dolphins ===
In February 1981, he became one of the first football players to publicly admit to a drug problem, and with the help of the NFL, he signed himself into a drug rehabilitation program. On June 10, Henderson signed with the Miami Dolphins, but suffered what proved to be a career-ending neck injury in the final preseason game against the Kansas City Chiefs. On August 31, he was placed on the injured reserve list. He was not re-signed after the season.

== Personal life ==
Lawrence Taylor said that he was inspired to wear 56 because it was Henderson's number.

Henderson briefly dated Anita Pointer of the Pointer Sisters.

Henderson wrote in his first book that he used cocaine while playing in Super Bowl 13 against the Pittsburgh Steelers. During the third quarter, "I walked to the side while we were on offense and took a couple deep belts of my liquid cocaine." The drug use did not apparently affect his play and his team did not notice or could not tell. "I wasn't aware he was going to the bathroom to snort cocaine or that he had cocaine in a vial on the sideline in Super Bowl 13," teammate Randy White said in Henderson's second book.

Cowboys teammate, defensive end Harvey Martin, noticed a change in the linebacker. "That season Thomas turned into what I call a creature. He screamed at everybody, teammates and opponents alike." Henderson got into a fight with his Dallas Cowboys teammate Randy White in the team locker room. He tried to start a fight with him after White threw a playfully fake punch toward his face. In response White was hit and he retaliated by smashing Henderson's face on the floor. The linebacker made another run at the defensive tackle but White just grabbed him and stuffed him into a nearby teammates locker. "Now that I think back I never had a chance in that fight. Here you have one of the strongest men in the history of the NFL (White) and me on crack. That fight wasn't fair," Henderson wrote in his book upon reflection of the altercation.

His teammates noticed a progressive change in his personality throughout the years. Drew Pearson wrote about his transformation in his memoir; "Henderson was still Thomas at this point (1975). He hadn't evolved into Hollywood yet." "There were some changes in the way he acted in the way he kept his moods under control," Tony Dorsett, Cowboys running back who played with Henderson noted in his book about Henderson's personality change.

Henderson's teammate and close friend Dallas Cowboys quarterback Roger Staubach spoke in his second book about his teammate's ability to use the media to his advantage through manipulation and domination, and that the thirst for media attention backfired and contributed to his decline. "It was all just too big for him." The former quarterback stressed that Henderson needed to realize he was a member of a team: "You don't create a personality without the proper surroundings and he didn't grasp that fact."

In November 1983, Henderson was arrested and charged with two counts of false imprisonment and one count each of forced oral copulation, sexual battery and furnishing cocaine to a minor.

The felony counts include an allegation that Henderson used a gun while committing the crimes, according to prosecutor Jim Cosper.

He was arrested after a 15-year-old girl claimed he lured her and a 17-year-old girl, a paraplegic wheelchair user, to the apartment the night before.

The younger girl told police Henderson pulled out a handgun and forced her to have sex with him before he assaulted both girls and threatened to kill them.

Police said they found a .38 caliber handgun in Henderson's apartment, along with narcotics paraphernalia. He claimed that he gave them drugs in exchange for consensual sex. Henderson had no history of assaults or sexual misconduct prior to the 1983 incident. He pleaded no contest to the charges and entered a treatment center and remained there for seven months before his 28 months in prison. He states that "Hollywood" died on November 8, 1983, and he has remained clean and sober ever since.

Henderson made the news again in 2000 by winning the Lotto Texas US$28 million jackpot. He started a charity (East Side Youth Services & Street Outreach) and has made major donations to the East Austin community where he grew up. He currently gives motivational speeches and sells videos of his anti-drug seminars (HHH 56 Investments Ltd.). When asked by The Dallas Morning News what he does every day having won the lottery, Henderson responded, "Not a damn thing, and I don't start that until after lunch". He is the father of two daughters and has five grandchildren. Henderson says crack cocaine was his downfall, and that embarrassing his mother, family and friends ultimately changed him. He is now retired and lectures across the United States.

Pearson explained that Henderson was a guest on his show and spoke about his admiration and love for the Dallas Cowboys. With his Dallas Cowboys gold lone star dental filling in his mouth, Henderson expressed how important it was for him to have been a member of the organization. Longtime Cowboys teammate and friend, former safety Charlie Waters, wrote about Henderson in his book and describes his confidence and strength and a personality Waters describes as engaging: "He could charm the Fangs off a snake." Henderson's smile was described by Waters to be infectious.

In the early 1990's, Henderson built a youth football stadium in his hometown of Austin, Texas. This was at his alma mater Anderson High School. Former and current Dallas Cowboys players and various members of the community also pitched in money for construction. To build a track for the school Henderson also raised money by fasting on the field he helped build. For seven days he slept in a tent near one of the goalposts and only consumed a mixture of lemon juice, molasses, cayenne pepper and water.

Despite his substance abuse and off field issues, his former teammates have always praised his athletic ability and talent. In his book "Hearing the Noise: My Life in the NFL", former teammate Preston Pearson explained some of the physical traits that contributed to Henderson's talents. A 215 pounder with a large wingspan akin to a person seven feet tall. "Henderson was not just a great football player. He was a great athlete."

== Books ==
- Henderson, Thomas; Knobler, Peter (1987). Out of Control: Confessions of an NFL Casualty. Putnam. ISBN 0-399-13264-3.
- Henderson, Thomas; Luksa, Frank (2004). In Control: The Rebirth of an NFL Legend. Sports Publishing LLC. ISBN 0-9759890-0-6.
