= Butch Johnson (American football) =

American football player (born 1954)

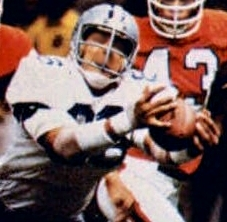
- Johnson playing for the Cowboys in Super Bowl XII

No. 86
- Position: Wide receiver

Personal information
- Born: May 28, 1954 (age 72); Los Angeles, California, U.S.
- Listed height: 6 ft 1 in (1.85 m)
- Listed weight: 187 lb (85 kg)

Career information
- High school: Susan Miller Dorsey (Los Angeles)
- College: UC Riverside
- NFL draft: 1976: 3rd round, 87th overall pick

Career history
- Dallas Cowboys (1976–1983); Houston Oilers (1984)*; Denver Broncos (1984–1985)
- * Offseason or practice squad member only

Awards and highlights
- Super Bowl champion (XII); Division II All-American (1974); Second-team Little All-Coast Team (1974)

Career NFL statistics
- Receptions: 193
- Receiving yards: 3,091
- Receiving touchdownss: 28
- Punt return yards: 1,313
- Kick return yards: 1,832
- Stats at Pro Football Reference

Michael McColly "Butch" Johnson (born May 28, 1954) is an American former professional football player who was a wide receiver in the National Football League (NFL) for the Dallas Cowboys and Denver Broncos. He played college football for the UC Riverside Highlanders and was selected in the third round (87th overall) of the 1976 NFL draft.

== Early life ==
Johnson attended Dorsey High School where he practiced football and track. In 1972, he finished second-place in the pole vault event at the All-City meet.

He accepted an athletic scholarship from Division II University of California, Riverside as a pole vaulter. In 1974, he was named to the second-team UPI Little All Coast Football team.

In 1975, he led the nation in receiving with 67 catches for 1,027 yards, in just eight games (he missed 2 contests with an injury), while earning All-American honors. The school dropped the football program the year after he graduated. He finished his college career with 139 receptions for 2,106 yards and 17 touchdowns.

In 2012, he was inducted into the UCR Sports Hall of Fame. The next year, he was inducted into the Riverside Sport Hall of Fame.

== Professional career ==
=== Dallas Cowboys ===
Johnson was selected by the Dallas Cowboys in the third round (87th overall) of the 1976 NFL draft. In 1978, he tied an NFL record with the most punt returns (9) in a game, while playing against the Buffalo Bills. He set a franchise record with 45 punt returns for 489 yards. He also returned 28 kickoffs for 693 yards (24.8-yard avg.).

In 1977, he alternated with Golden Richards, recording 12 receptions for 135 yards (11.3-yard average) and one touchdown. He also returned a club record 50 punts and led the team with 22 kickoff returns. At the end of the year in Super Bowl XII against the Denver Broncos, he had his most notable career highlight, a 45-yard diving touchdown reception from Roger Staubach, which is considered to be a "Super Bowl Classic". In the Dallas Morning News newspaper, after Super Bowl XII, on Monday, January 16, 1978, the front-page photo was titled "Outfielder Butch", referring to his diving touchdown grab in the end zone, despite a broken thumb he suffered earlier in the game.

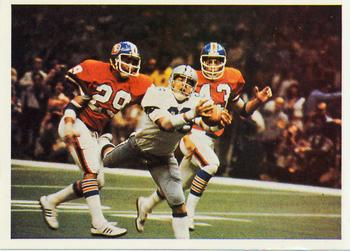
Johnson making his memorable 45-yard touchdown catch against the Broncos in Super Bowl XII

In 1978, although he couldn't earn a starting role over Tony Hill, he became the leading punt returner in franchise history while breaking again his single-season record with 51 punt returns and also placed second on the Cowboys all-time kickoff return list. He had another touchdown reception in Super Bowl XIII which the Cowboys lost to the Pittsburgh Steelers, making him the second player in NFL history to score touchdowns in back-to-back Super Bowls.

In 1979, he fractured his right little finger in the preseason finale against the Steelers and was forced to miss the first 5 games. With both Hill and Drew Pearson having 1,000-yard seasons, his opportunities were limited. He started in the 15th game against the Philadelphia Eagles in place of an injured Pearson, and caught a deflected 17-yard pass for the decisive touchdown in the playoff-clinching victory. He also stopped returning punts and kickoffs.

In 1981, he started the first 6 games in place of an injured Hill, finishing the season with 25 receptions for 552 yards and 5 receiving touchdowns (tied for the team lead). He also developed a touchdown celebration known as the "California Quake", where he would simulate pulling guns out of holsters and proceed to shoot them and shake. It became one of the most famous individual celebrations in league history, and one of the reasons the NFL banned rehearsed end-zone touchdown celebrations.

In 1983, he had his best year with 41 receptions for 561 yards, but he had grown tired of his third receiver status and requested a trade. On April 12, 1984, even though Pearson had suffered a career-ending injury, the Cowboys granted his wishes and traded him to the Houston Oilers in exchange for wide receiver Mike Renfro, plus the right to swap second-round picks in the 1984 NFL draft and the Oilers' fifth-rounder in the 1985 NFL draft. A year later, the Cowboys used that fifth round pick to select running back Herschel Walker.

For a long time he was considered one of the best-backup wide receivers in the NFL, but during his 8 seasons with the Cowboys he could never earn a starter position. As the third receiver during that time, he was primarily known for his acrobatic and clutch receptions. Besides leaving as the second leading punt returner in franchise history, he also was one of two players in club history to rank in the top ten career list in both kickoff and punt return average yards.

=== Houston Oilers ===
In 1984, Johnson's outrageous personality and flamboyant on-field antics wore thin with the Houston Oilers very quickly, who after 3 deliberately poor played preseason games, traded him to the Denver Broncos in exchange of a third round draft choice (#58-Tyrone Davis) on August 20.

=== Denver Broncos ===
In 1984, he reunited with head coach Dan Reeves who was his offensive coordinator with the Cowboys. He had career highs with 11 starts, 42 receptions (third on the team) for 587 yards (second on the team) and 6 receiving touchdowns (second on the team). Against the New England Patriots, he posted 9 receptions for 156 yards.

The next year, an injury slowed his performance and eventually lost his starting job to Vance Johnson. He registered 8 starts, 19 receptions for 380 yards, a 20-yard average (led the team) and 3 touchdowns, but went 6 weeks late in the season without a single catch. He was released on August 18, 1986.

Johnson played in the NFL for 10 seasons, catching 193 passes for 3,091 yards and 28 touchdowns. He appeared in 5 NFC Championship Games and 2 Super Bowls. He also tied the Super Bowl records for most fumble recoveries in one game and most career fumble recoveries (2).

== NFL career statistics ==
Legend
	Won the Super Bowl
**Bold**	Career high

=== Regular season ===
Year	Team	Games		Receiving				
Year	Team	GP	GS	Rec	Yds	Avg	Lng	TD
1976	DAL	14	2	5	84	16.8	43	2
1977	DAL	14	0	12	135	11.3	22	1
1978	DAL	16	0	12	155	12.9	23	0
1979	DAL	11	1	6	105	17.5	28	1
1980	DAL	16	1	19	263	13.8	29	4
1981	DAL	16	7	25	552	22.1	55	5
1982	DAL	9	1	12	269	**22.4**	49	3
1983	DAL	16	5	41	561	13.7	46	3
1984	DEN	16	11	**42**	**587**	14.0	49	**6**
1985	DEN	16	8	19	380	20.0	**65**	3
		144	36	193	3,091	16.0	65	28

=== Postseason ===
Year	Team	Games		Receiving				
Year	Team	GP	GS	Rec	Yds	Avg	Lng	TD
1976	DAL	1	0	1	18	18.0	18	0
1977	DAL	3	1	2	53	**26.5**	**45**	**1**
1978	DAL	3	0	4	49	12.3	26	**1**
1979	DAL	1	0	1	3	3.0	3	0
1980	DAL	3	1	4	82	20.5	35	**1**
1981	DAL	2	1	1	20	20.0	20	0
1982	DAL	3	0	**9**	**149**	16.6	26	**1**
1983	DAL	1	0	3	20	6.7	12	0
		17	3	25	394	15.8	45	4

== Personal life ==
His brother in law was the late singer-songwriter Bill Withers. Former Massachusetts Senator Edward Brooke is his second cousin.
