= Bob Breunig =

American football player (born 1953)

No. 53
- Position: Linebacker

Personal information
- Born: July 4, 1953 (age 73); Inglewood, California, U.S.
- Listed height: 6 ft 2 in (1.88 m)
- Listed weight: 226 lb (103 kg)

Career information
- High school: Alhambra (Phoenix, Arizona)
- College: Arizona State
- NFL draft: 1975: 3rd round, 70th overall pick

Career history
- Dallas Cowboys (1975–1984)

Awards and highlights
- Super Bowl champion (XII); Second-team All-Pro (1980); 3× Pro Bowl (1979, 1980, 1982); 4× First-team All-NFC; First-team All American (1974); 3× All-WAC (1972–1974); WAC Defensive Player of the Year (1973); WAC Lineman of the Year; Butkus 1999 Silver Anniversary Linebacker Award

Career NFL statistics
- Games played: 135
- Interceptions: 9
- Fumbles recoveries: 8
- Stats at Pro Football Reference
- College Football Hall of Fame

Robert Paul Breunig (born July 4, 1953) is an American former professional football player who was a linebacker for the Dallas Cowboys of the National Football League (NFL). He played college football for the Arizona State Sun Devils. A three-time Pro Bowl section, he won a Super Bowl with the Cowboys.

== Early life ==
Breunig attended Alhambra High School in Phoenix, Arizona, where he played on the 1967 freshman football A Team that was 10-0 and he was named most valuable player. He also received a varsity letter on the wrestling team as a freshman.

Bob played on the varsity football team in 1968 as a sophomore and was a leading tackler in a number of games. in his junior year, in 1969, he was named Second-team All State and the Team Most Valuable Defensive Player. In 1970 as a senior, the team went 8–2, still the best record in Alhambra HS history, Bob led the team in scoring, rushing and tackling as a fullback and middle linebacker, receiving All-State "Defensive Captain" honors. He was named the team MVP.

He was also the wrestling 1971 AAA Heavyweight State Champion achieving a 42–1 record during his junior and senior seasons.

In 2000, he was included in the Arizona Republic's "Athletes of the Century" list and to the Arizona All-Century high school football team. In 2010, he was inducted into the Arizona High School Sports Hall of Fame.

== College career ==
Breunig signed with Arizona State University out of Phoenix Alhambra High School and became a starter by his second year (NCAA football freshmen were then ineligible), leading the team in tackles with 91 (incl. 19 against the Air Force Academy). He would remain the team leader in tackles with 117 as a junior and 145 as a senior. He was a First-team All American (Kodak, Time, Sporting News, Pop Warner), a Second-team All American (AP and UPI), a two-time WAC Defensive Player of the Year and a three-time All-WAC selection. He played in the East-West Shrine Game, the Hula Bowl and the Coaches All-America Game.

He was a part of two 10-win seasons, a 28–8 overall record, two Fiesta Bowl wins, and the 1972 and 1973 Western Athletic Conference championships. He starred for three nationally ranked teams from 1972 to 1974. In 1999, he was chosen as the Butkus Silver Anniversary Award Winner, and in 1996, he was named to the ASU "All Time Team" Arizona State University and Western Athletic Conference 20 Year Team.

He graduated holding the career total tackles record (353), the career solo tackles record (206) and the single-season records for both categories. He was named team MVP as a senior, was a Team Captain twice.

As a freshman at ASU, Breunig wrestled on the varsity team for one year, finishing with a 10–4 record. He was selected as the Phoenix Press Box Association Amateur Athlete of the Year in 1974. He graduated with a Bachelor of Science degree in Business Marketing in 1977.

In 1977, he was inducted into Arizona State University Athletic Hall of Fame. In 2012, he was inducted into the Sun Devil Football Ring of Honor. In 2015, he was inducted into the College Football Hall of Fame.

== Professional career ==
Breunig was selected in the third round (70th overall) of the 1975 NFL draft, as part of the Dallas Cowboys' Dirty Dozen draft. In 1976, he became a starter at strongside linebacker, replacing the retired Dave Edwards.

In 1977, he replaced the retired Lee Roy Jordan as the team's middle linebacker and defensive signal caller, making him just the third player in franchise history (25 yrs) to hold the position as a regular starter. In 1979, he registered 18 tackles (9 solo) in one game against the Philadelphia Eagles. He led the team in tackles in six seasons and broke the Cowboys' single-season tackle record (167) in 1979.

Breunig started 117 straight games, until missing half of the 1984 season because of back problems that led to his retirement. He ended his career as the franchise's second-leading tackler (behind Jordan) with 1,016 stops, having played in ten seasons, appearing in 20 playoff games, six NFC championships and three Super Bowls. He was a four-time team captain, a three-time Pro Bowler, a second-team All-Pro and a four-time All-NFC selection.

Breunig was named to the Dallas Cowboys Ft. Worth Star Telegram 50 Year/50 Player Dallas Cowboy Anniversary Team, the 1999 Sporting News All Time Dallas Cowboy Team, USA Today Sports 2014 All Time Dallas Cowboy Defense Team and in 2016 the Dallas Morning News All Time Top 5 Dallas Cowboy Linebackers.

== Personal life ==
After football he entered into a partnership with former teammate Roger Staubach, in Investment/Development Real Estate. Bob acquired that Company in 1990 and operated a continuing successful venture until 2008 at which time the company was sold and Bob transitioned to other endeavors.

Bob was named the Dallas Father of the Year in 2006 and has been recognized for a number of other civic initiatives and has served on Several Charitable Boards through the years including Fellowship of Christian Athletes, The Urban Alternative, Young Life, Arizona State University Board of Trustees, National Search Ministries, Liberty Institute, Happy Hill Farm Children's Home and Fellowship Bible Church Dallas (Elder).
