= Fred Rayhle =

American football player (born 1954)

No. 82
- Position: Tight end

Personal information
- Born: April 9, 1954 (age 72); Covington, Kentucky, U.S.
- Listed height: 6 ft 5 in (1.96 m)
- Listed weight: 217 lb (98 kg)

Career information
- High school: Oak Hills
- College: Chattanooga
- NFL draft: 1977: undrafted

Career history
- Dallas Cowboys (1977)*; Seattle Seahawks (1977)
- * Offseason or practice squad member only
- Stats at Pro Football Reference

Fred Rayhle (born April 9, 1954) is an American former professional football player who was a tight end for two games with the Seattle Seahawks of the National Football League (NFL) in 1977. He played college football and basketball for the Chattanooga Mocs.
