= Percy Howard =

American football and basketball player (born 1952)

No. 81
- Position: Wide receiver

Personal information
- Born: January 21, 1952 (age 74); Savannah, Georgia, U.S.
- Listed height: 6 ft 4 in (1.93 m)
- Listed weight: 210 lb (95 kg)

Career information
- High school: Dillard (Fort Lauderdale, Florida)
- College: Austin Peay (1972–1975)
- NFL draft: 1975: undrafted

Career history
- Dallas Cowboys (1975–1977)

Awards and highlights
- Super Bowl champion (XII); All-OVC (1974)

Career NFL statistics
- Games played: 8
- Receptions: 1
- Receiving yards: 34
- Receiving touchdowns: 1
- Stats at Pro Football Reference

Percy Lenard Howard (born January 21, 1952) is an American former professional football player who was a wide receiver for the Dallas Cowboys of the National Football League (NFL). He was an unlikely star for the Cowboys in Super Bowl X. He played college basketball for the Austin Peay Governors.

== Early life ==
Howard attended Dillard High School where he lettered in basketball, football and track, specializing in the 100 and 200 yard dash. In football, he had 13 touchdowns receptions at wide receiver and 9 interceptions at safety.

He accepted a basketball scholarship from Austin Peay State University, where he averaged 12.4 points and 7.3 rebounds per game during three varsity seasons (1972–73 through 1974–75). The 6-4, 215-pound forward was an All-OVC selection in 1974–75 and averaged seven points and seven rebounds per game in four NCAA Tournament contests in 1973 and 1974. He was also a teammate of the legendary James "Fly" Williams.

== Professional career ==
Although Howard did not play football at Austin Peay University, the Dallas Cowboys saw a tremendous athlete and signed him to an undrafted free agent contract in 1975. He became one of only a handful of college athletes to reach the NFL without playing any college football.

Howard joined the Cowboys as a kick returner and a wide receiver. During his first preseason game in 1975, he broke his cheekbone. Howard was the third receiver on the Cowboys during the 1975 season. Unfortunately for him, the top two receivers Drew Pearson and Golden Richards played virtually every offensive snap, and the Cowboys did not use formations with three receivers. He played primarily on special teams during the regular season, and his only statistical contributions were a pair of kickoff returns for 51 total yards.

Late in Super Bowl X, Howard got a rare opportunity to play on offense, when Richards broke a rib. With the Pittsburgh Steelers leading by 11 points with less than two minutes to go, Howard caught a 34-yard touchdown pass from Roger Staubach over Mel Blount, cutting the deficit to five points, before the successful extra point kick. A late turnover by the Steelers gave the Cowboys a shot to win the game at the end, and Howard was again involved in a last-second Hail Mary pass by Staubach, but he could not make the catch. His Super Bowl touchdown made him the second rookie ever to score a Super Bowl touchdown after Duane Thomas in Super Bowl V.

During the 1976 NFL season, Howard had a knee injury during a preseason game and was required to sit out the remainder of the season. The following season, he re-injured his knee during a veteran's orientation session in the 1977 training camp, causing him to sit out the entire season. For Super Bowl XII he served the Cowboys in a scouting role since he was still trying to recover from his injury. He was released by Dallas before the 1978 season and claimed by the Green Bay Packers, but failed his physical with the Packers as his knee had never fully recovered.

The 34 yard touchdown catch in Super Bowl X, turned out to be Howard's only career reception and his last game in the NFL. Still, he would become part of the Cowboys lore and was named #6 on NFL Top 10's Top Ten One-Shot Wonders.
