= Preston Pearson =

American football player (born 1945)

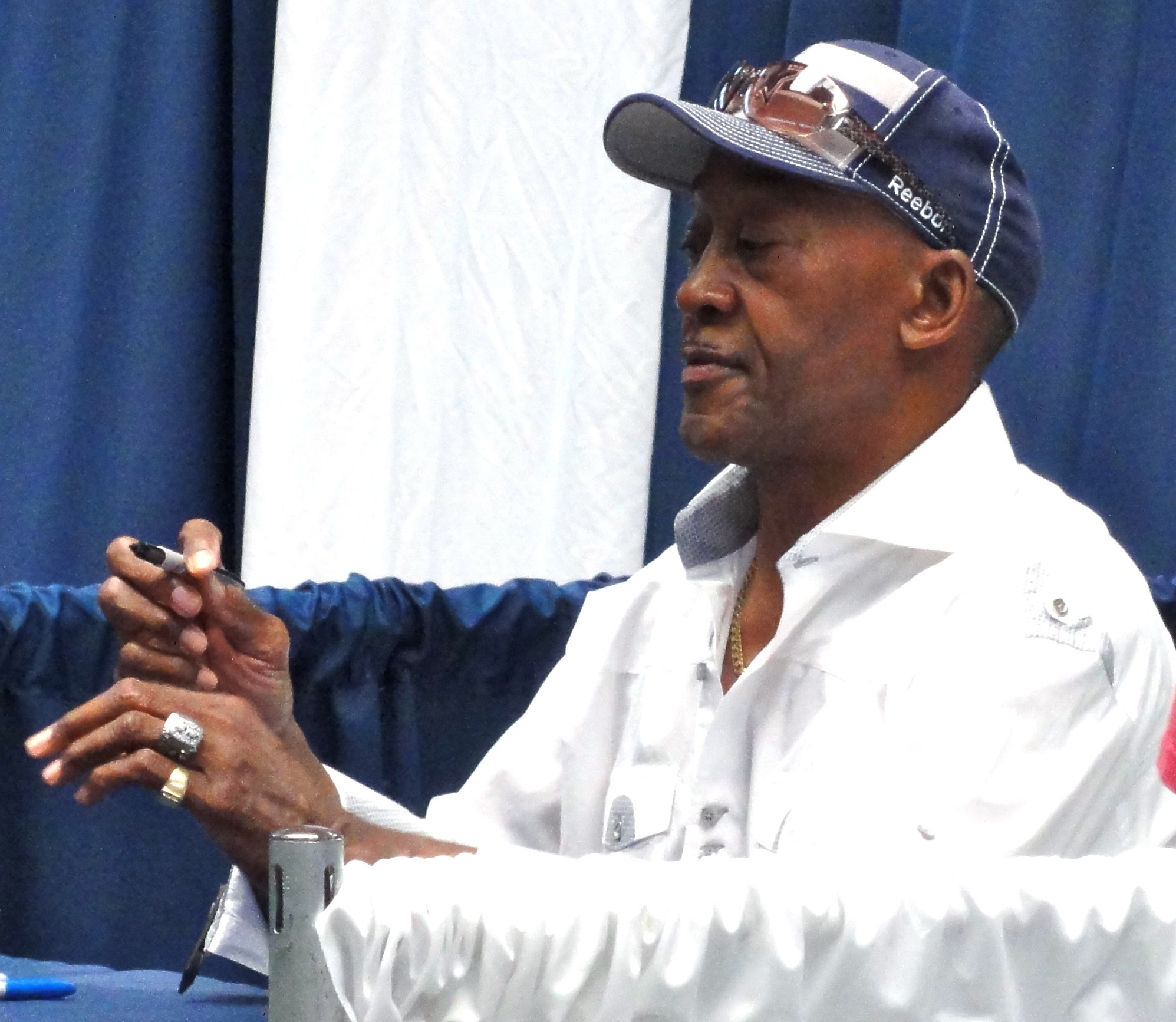
- Pearson signs autographs for fans, 2012

No. 26
- Position: Running back

Personal information
- Born: January 17, 1945 (age 81); Freeport, Illinois, U.S.
- Listed height: 6 ft 1 in (1.85 m)
- Listed weight: 205 lb (93 kg)

Career information
- High school: Freeport
- College: Illinois
- NFL draft: 1967: 12th round, 298th overall pick

Career history
- Baltimore Colts (1967–1969); Pittsburgh Steelers (1970–1974); Dallas Cowboys (1975–1980)

Awards and highlights
- 2× Super Bowl champion (IX, XII); NFL champion (1968)

Career NFL statistics
- Games played: 176
- Rushing yards: 3,609
- Receiving yards: 3,095
- Touchdowns: 30
- Stats at Pro Football Reference

Preston James Pearson (born January 17, 1945) is an American former professional football player who was a running back in the National Football League (NFL) for the Baltimore Colts, Pittsburgh Steelers and Dallas Cowboys. He played college basketball for the Illinois Fighting Illini. Pearson played in five Super Bowls with three different teams. In describing the difficulties Pearson faced over the course of his 14-year NFL career, Pittsburgh sportswriter Phil Musick stated "Pearson has had more bad breaks than a glassblower with cold sores".

== Early life ==
Pearson was born on January 17, 1945, in Freeport, Illinois. He attended Freeport High School, where he received All-State honors as the 6 ft (1.83 m) center of the basketball team. As a senior in 1963, he was unanimously chosen Big Eight All-Conference in basketball, leading the conference in scoring and his team in rebounding. He also competed in football, and on the track team in the pole vault, high jump and broad jump. He played both offensive and defensive back in high school.

Pearson's older brother Rufus Pearson Jr. starred on the school's football and track teams. For most of their high school years, the brothers were the only African Americans on the school's sports teams. Rufus went on to college at the University of Southern Illinois.

== College ==
Pearson attended the University of Illinois. He played basketball at Illinois, but did not play on the football team there.

Pearson had a strong desire to go to Illinois, even though he was offered a basketball scholarship to attend Bowling Green University. After writing a letter to Illinois basketball head coach Harry Combes, Combes agreed to meet with Pearson; or in other reports responded to Pearson by mail. Combes told Pearson he did not have a scholarship to offer Pearson, but Pearson could try out for the freshman basketball team; and if he made the team, then it might be possible for Pearson to get a partial, half, scholarship. Pearson came to Illinois and made the team as a guard, but he had to work a number of jobs to make ends meet, sometimes going hungry, so he could attend Illinois. He received the partial scholarship the next season as a sophomore, and reportedly only received a full scholarship for his senior year.

At Illinois, he did not play center as he had in high school; rather, he was moved to guard and sometimes forward. He became a three-year player, and two-year starter, on the Illini varsity. At 6 ft 1 in (1.85 m) and 193 lb. (87.5 kg), he was known for his tough defense and became the team's defensive stopper. He was assigned to defend other Big Ten teams top offensive players, such as Michigan's Cazzie Russell, Purdue's Rick Mount, and Indiana's Tom and Dick Van Arsdale. In possibly his biggest basketball moment, during a January 29, 1967 game against UCLA, the 6 ft 1 in Pearson became one of the few players who ever blocked a "skyhook" shot by the 7 ft 2 in (2.18 m) future Hall of Fame center Lew Alcindor (later known as Kareem Abdul-Jabbar). United Press International featured a photo of Pearson's block with its story on the game.

Pearson played in 67 games over three years on the varsity basketball team, averaging 5.1 points and 3.6 rebounds per game. Pearson started much of the time for the Illini as a junior, and was considered a regular guard on the team; though he has also been identified as playing forward that year. He showed flashes of greatness, but averaged only 4.8 points per game, to go along with 3.1 rebounds per game. It is alternatively reported, he finished his varsity career with a 6.7 points per game average, in 47 varsity games. As a senior, he was named a starter at guard, averaging 8.7 points and 6.0 rebounds per game over the 1966-67 season. He was instrumental in the team's successes that year.

Although he possessed the athletic and leaping ability, and defensive skill, he never developed his offensive game, and this lack of offense precluded an NBA career.

In 2017, he was inducted into the Illinois Basketball Coaches Association's Hall of Fame, along with Naismith Memorial Basketball Hall of Fame player Kevin Garnett.

== Professional career ==
Although Pearson did not play college football, he was considered a professional football prospect at defensive back because of his great athleticism, leaping ability, quickness and desire for playing with physical contact. While still at Illinois, the Chicago Bears and Pittsburgh Steelers contacted him about playing in the NFL.

=== Baltimore Colts ===
Pearson was selected by future Hall of Fame coach Don Shula and the Baltimore Colts in the twelfth round (298th overall) of the 1967 NFL/AFL draft, despite never playing a down of college football, after the team was impressed with his speed and athleticism. He was first tried at defensive back and was promoted from the taxi squad to the regular roster on November 1, 1967, playing mostly on special teams. As a rookie, he learned the most from any player by observing the meticulous work and preparation of Colts Hall of Fame receiver Raymond Berry. Later in his career, in 1975, Pearson said his biggest thrill as a professional player came during his first training camp with the Colts, seeing Hall of Fame legends like quarterback Johnny Unitas and running back Lenny Moore up close.

In 1968, he was moved to running back, at least in part because of Lenny Moore's retirement. He became a captain of the special teams units, at least by 1969, after leading the league in kickoff returns in 1968 with a 35.1 yard per return average. (As Pearson only returned 15 kickoffs, Ron Smith's 27.6 yards per return average on 26 returns is recognized as high in the NFL's 1968 season.) He registered the longest kickoff return of the year in the NFL (102 yards). His two touchdown returns on kickoffs in 1968 also led the league.

In an October 1968 game against the San Francisco 49ers, Pearson returned the opening kickoff for a 96-yard touchdown. In the same game, he recovered a fumble while covering a kickoff, which led to a touchdown. It was the first time he ever returned a kickoff for a touchdown and his first fumble recovery as a professional. He was awarded the game ball by his teammates. On November 10, 1968, he returned a kickoff 102 yards for a touchdown against the Detroit Lions.

As a running back in 1968, Pearson averaged more than 4 yards per carry on 19 carries. He had two pass receptions, both for touchdowns, including a 61-yard touchdown reception on an Earl Morrall pass and a nine-yard reception of a Johnny Unitas pass. Both touchdown receptions came against the Los Angeles Rams on December 15, 1968. The Colts finished the season 13–1, winning the NFL's Coastal Division. They won the divisional round playoff game against the Minnesota Vikings, with Pearson returning one kick for 31 yards. Pearson had started the game at fullback for an injured Jerry Hill, but Shula had to put Hill in for Pearson to block against the Vikings defensive line and blitzing defense.

The Colts next won the 1968 NFL Championship Game over the Cleveland Browns, 34–0, with Pearson returning one kick for 21 yards. Pearson played in Super Bowl III, with the Colts losing to the New York Jets, 16–7. He returned two kickoffs for 59 yards. This was the first of Pearson's five Super Bowl appearances.

In 1969, Pearson started in two games for the Colts at running back. On the year, he rushed 24 times for 81 yards and had four pass receptions for 64 yards. He returned six punts for 37 yards. Pearson led the NFL with 31 kickoff returns. His return average fell to 22.8. His rookie teammate Jim Duncan led the NFL with a 29.5 yards per kickoff return average, and had a 92-yard touchdown return.

On May 31, 1970, he was traded, along with defensive back Ocie Austin, to the Pittsburgh Steelers in exchange for linebacker Ray May and a twelfth-round draft choice (#294-Bobby Wuensch). Pearson wanted a trade as he saw the Colts were making Duncan their primary returner, and halfback Tom Matte was going to keep his starting role, limiting Pearson’s opportunities to play. Duncan led the NFL again in 1970, with a 35.4 yards per kickoff return average. Matte played only two games after suffering a knee injury and was replaced by Norm Bulaich, who led the 1970 Colts team in rushing with 426 yards in 139 attempts. The 1970 Colts went on to win Super Bowl V.

=== Pittsburgh Steelers ===
In 1970, Pearson reunited with Chuck Noll who had become the Steelers head coach in 1969. Noll was Don Shula's defensive backfield coach with the Colts when Pearson joined the Colts in 1967, and filled that position until leaving the Colts after the Super Bowl loss. It has also been stated Noll was Shula's defensive coordinator.

Pearson's role changed in Pittsburgh, and he became the starter at running back in his first year with the team, with John Fuqua at fullback. Pearson started all 14 games for the Steelers with 503 rushing yards on 173 attempts (2.9 yards per carry) and two touchdowns. He also caught six passes for 71 yards, but only returned four kickoffs that year. Fuqua had 691 yards on 138 attempts (5.0 yards per carry) and seven rushing touchdowns, as well as 289 yards on 23 pass receptions for two touchdowns.

Pearson and Fuqua were the starters again in 1971, with Pearson's numbers improving significantly. He averaged 4.6 yards per attempt, gaining 605 yards, and had 20 receptions for 246 yards and two touchdowns. His 605 yards ranked Pearson fifteenth among running backs in the American Football Conference (AFC) and 27th overall in the NFL, while he was second on the team to Fuqua's 625 yards (on a 4.0 yards per carry average). His 4.6 yards per attempt was sixth best in the entire NFL.

In 1972, he was the eighth leading rusher in the AFC through the first four games, until he tore his left hamstring against the Houston Oilers in the fifth game of the season on October 15, 1972. He had rushed for 242 yards through five games. He was replaced with rookie Franco Harris, who gained 115 yards in the Houston game, and ultimately gained over 1,000 yards on the season. Harris would not relinquish the position again on his way to the Pro Football Hall of Fame. Pearson missed three games with the hamstring injury, and returned to play in six more games that year, chiefly on special teams; and none as a starting running back.

In 1973, he was switched to wide receiver during training camp, but was moved back to running back before the start of the season. Harris was injured going into the season, and Pearson received considerable playing time at running back during the season opener against the Detroit Lions, rushing for 48 yards on 15 carries and catching two passes for 15 more yards. Pearson went on to start in 13 of 14 games that year, rushing for 554 yards in 132 carries, and catching 11 passes for 173 yards, while playing alongside Harris and Fuqua in the backfield during the year. Although only starting in eight games, Harris still led the team in rushing attempts and yards; though Pearson led the team with 4.2 yards per carry. Pearson and Harris started together in the Steelers backfield in their division round playoff loss to the Oakland Raiders that year.

When Harris was injured early in the 1974 season, Pearson got an opportunity to start. In the fourth game of the season against the Houston Oilers he rushed for 115 yards on only 15 carries (including a 53-yard run), and caught three passes for 42 yards. This was the best yardage game of his career. However, he ruptured a blood vessel in his thigh the following week on a hit from a Cincinnati Bengals linebacker, that had to be surgically drained when it did not heal properly. By the time he recovered, Harris had returned and Rocky Bleier had become the starting halfback next to Harris, being both a good blocker and runner. Pearson still finished as the team's third leading rusher with 317 yards, behind Harris (1,006 yards) and Bleier (373 yards), even though he missed five games.

The Steelers were the victors in Super Bowl IX over the Minnesota Vikings, 16–6. Pearson returned one kickoff for 15 yards, and had no rushing attempts or receptions in the game.

==== 1974 players strike ====
During the 1974 pre-season, the players went on strike for 42 days in an effort to establish unrestricted free agency. Pearson was the Steelers union representative to the National Football League Players Association (NFLPA). During the strike, among other things Pearson was among three Steelers players addressing a meeting of all Steelers rookies on the players' strike position. Coach Noll attended the meeting at which Steelers vice president Dan Rooney spoke, who told the rookies they needed to focus solely on playing football. Pearson was among the players picketing the Steelers facility during training camp. Noll saw the strike as a bad problem for his team that was getting worse because another team in the Steelers' division had players crossing the picket line. As a leader on the picket line, he was said to have earned Noll's enmity.

Rooney tried not to show any animus toward the players, but Noll had called the players lemmings at one point. Noll did not hold grudges against his best players, even if they had supported the union during the strike, by denying them a place on the team. Hall of Fame linebacker Jack Ham supported this by pointing out that future Hall of Famer Mel Blount once sued Noll and Noll did not hesitate to start Blount.

Pearson was one player, however, who had some bitterness toward Noll, even though he remained on the Steelers during the 1974 season. "'Chuck didn't appreciate the union people at all and took it personally. I lost a little of my job opportunity as a result, and that had a lot to do with me not being in Pittsburgh the next year'". Even before the strike, Pearson believed there was a communication issue between him and Noll, and he typically dealt with running back coach Dick Hoak. He and Noll also had a difference in their rushing style philosophies.

On September 16, 1975, the team waived Pearson after deciding to keep rookie running back Mike Collier instead. Years later, Pearson said about being cut, "'Chuck did me a favor. I was able to get to Dallas – and away from him'". At the time, only six players in franchise history had run for more yards.

=== Dallas Cowboys ===
On September 19, 1975, after losing Calvin Hill and Walt Garrison, the Dallas Cowboys were looking for an experienced running back, so they signed Pearson as a free agent and in turn waived rookie quarterback Jim Zorn to make room for him on the roster. It has been noted that the acquisition of Pearson and the success of the Dirty Dozen draft were the key reasons that helped the team reach the Super Bowl that year.

Pearson was an all-around player, contributing in running, receiving, blocking and special teams. Head coach Tom Landry once said: "He's one of the best halfback blockers I've seen". During his time with the Cowboys he was widely recognized as the player who defined the position of "third-down back". Landry created the role for Pearson in the context of the shotgun formation, because of Pearson's toughness as a blocker, agility to get open as a receiver, and elusiveness from being easily tackled. This forced defenses to use nickel schemes to assign a cornerback to cover him, or to double-team him. Landry also used Pearson as a specialist in passing and short yardage situations. In the early 1970s, Miami Dolphins running back Jim Kiick also had been recognized for his exceptional pass receiving skills on third down, to go along with his fine blocking ability.

His best season came in 1975, when he became a starter and rushed for 509 yards, caught 27 passes for 351 yards, and gained another 391 yards on kickoff returns. He then went on to assist the Cowboys to a Super Bowl X appearance by catching 12 passes for over 200 yards and three touchdowns in their two NFC playoff games. In the divisional round playoff victory against the favored Minnesota Vikings, Pearson had 34 yards rushing on 11 carries, and 77 yards on five pass receptions. He also returned two kickoffs for 26 yards. One of Pearson's catches against Minnesota was on the January 5, 1976 cover of Sports Illustrated, next to the heading "The Cowboys Win A Shocker".

In the following week's NFC Championship Game, the Cowboys defeated the heavily favored Los Angeles Rams, 37–7. Pearson had seven receptions for 123 yards and three receiving touchdowns from future Hall of Fame quarterback Roger Staubach (tying an NFC/NFL championship game touchdown record set by Gary Collins in 1964). He also rushed seven times and gained 20 yards. His team ended up losing Super Bowl X to the Pittsburgh Steelers, with Pearson rushing for 14 yards and catching five passes for 53 yards.

In 1976, he was limited after having surgery for damaged knee ligaments, an injury suffered during a training camp tackling drill. He was expected to be in the Cowboys' starting backfield before the injury, but was able to start just two games in the regular season. He appeared in 10 games, posting 68 carries for 233 yards, one rushing touchdown, 23 receptions for 316 yards and 2 receiving touchdowns. However, he did not actually play until the 7th week of the season, in a game against the Chicago Bears. He caught six passes for 90 yards and two touchdowns in that game, and had 48 rushing yards on nine carries.

In 1977, he began the season as the starter at running back, and was the starter for nine games before giving way to future Hall of Fame rookie Tony Dorsett. Dorsett’s extraordinary play early in the season foreshadowed the change, and he gained over 1,000 yards on the season even though starting only four games. The change to Dorsett as starter was made for the week 10 game against the Pittsburgh Steelers, in Pittsburgh, where Pearson resided and Dorsett played college football. Pearson broke Calvin Hill's franchise record for receptions by a running back and finished second on the team with 46 (just two behind All-Pro wide receiver Drew Pearson), while also tallying 535 receiving yards (second on the team).

The 1977 Cowboys went on to win Super Bowl XII over the Denver Broncos, 27–10. Dorsett and fullback Robert Newhouse did the lion's share of rushing for the Cowboys, but Pearson, in his fourth Super Bowl, led the team with five receptions that day; while also gaining 11 rushing yards in three attempts. Pearson had three receptions for 48 yards in the Cowboys' 23–6 victory over the Minnesota Vikings in the NFC Championship Game.

In 1978, he played behind Dorsett and Newhouse, with only 25 rushing attempts on the year. However, Pearson led the team and broke his own club season record for receptions by a running back with 47, while collecting 526 receiving yards (third on the team behind receivers Tony Hill and Drew Pearson). He played in his fifth and final Super Bowl, a 35–31 loss to the Steelers in Super Bowl XIII. He had one rushing attempt and two receptions in the game.

In 1979, Pearson registered 26 receptions (23 for first downs) for 333 receiving yards, one receiving touchdown, 7 carries for 14 yards, and one rushing touchdown. In the 35–34 win against the Washington Redskins on the final day of the regular season, he collected five catches for 108 yards. He also had a diving 26-yard touchdown reception at the end of the first half, and two catches for 47 yards in the final drive, including a 25-yarder that set up the winning touchdown pass to Tony Hill from the Redskins' eight yard line. Staubach said it was the most exciting football game in which he had ever played.

In his last season (1980), Pearson was used mostly as a receiver in the backfield, with 20 receptions for 213 yards and two touchdowns in 11 games and only three rushing attempts. He retired on July 15, 1981.

== Legacy ==
Throughout his NFL career, Pearson was used frequently as a rusher, receiver, and kickoff returner on special teams. He played for some of the most famous teams of his era, and played in five Super Bowls (Super Bowl III, IX, X, XII, and XIII) – tied for fourth most all-time with a number of players, behind Tom Brady at 10 and Stephen Gostkowski and Mike Lodish at six (as of January 2025). The three coaches for whom he played, Don Shula, Chuck Knoll and Tom Landry were selected among the ten greatest coaches in the first 100 years of the NFL. Two of the running backs who took his starting job, Franco Harris and Tony Dorsett, are in the Hall of Fame.

In his 14 NFL seasons, he rushed for 3,609 yards, caught 254 passes for 3,095 yards, returned seven punts for 40 yards, and gained 2,801 yards on kickoff returns. Overall, Pearson gained 9,545 total yards and scored 33 touchdowns (17 rushing, 13 receiving, two kickoff returns and one fumble recovery). He was the first player to appear in the Super Bowl with 3 different teams.

Pearson also holds the distinction of being one of the few, if not the only, players to have been led by Don Shula, Chuck Noll, and Tom Landry — three of the greatest coaches in NFL history with eight Super Bowl titles among them. Not only were his coaches Hall of Famers, but also his quarterbacks (Johnny Unitas, Terry Bradshaw, and Roger Staubach) and some of his fellow running backs (Lenny Moore, Franco Harris, and Tony Dorsett) are enshrined in Canton.

== Personal life ==
Pearson moved to Dallas in 1977. In 1979 or 1981, Pearson teamed with his wife, Janie Tilford (who had a career in entertainment and public relations promotions) to form Pro-Style Associates, a sports marketing business in the Dallas area, with Pearson as its president and Tilford vice president. Pro-Style began by matching corporations with athletic talent to create a unique marketing endeavor for special events. Pearson and Tilford had two sons. Tilford died in August 2011.

During the formation of the Asia Pacific Football League, Pearson was contracted by the league to consult and assist the league in its organizational efforts. What became of his role is unknown as the APFL was never formed.

Pearson wrote a 1985 memoir, Hearing the Noise, My Life in the NFL, ISBN 978-0688041915.
