= Golden Richards =

American football player (1950–2024)

No. 83
- Position: Wide receiver

Personal information
- Born: December 31, 1950; Salt Lake City, Utah, U.S.
- Died: February 23, 2024 (aged 73); Murray, Utah, U.S.
- Listed height: 6 ft 1 in (1.85 m)
- Listed weight: 181 lb (82 kg)

Career information
- High school: Granite (Salt Lake City)
- College: Brigham Young; Hawaii
- NFL draft: 1973: 2nd round, 46th overall pick

Career history
- Dallas Cowboys (1973–1977); Chicago Bears (1978–1979); Denver Broncos (1980)*
- * Offseason or practice squad member only

Awards and highlights
- Super Bowl champion (XII); All-WAC (1971)

Career NFL statistics
- Receptions: 122
- Receiving yards: 2,136
- Receiving touchdowns: 17
- Stats at Pro Football Reference

John Golden Richards (December 31, 1950 – February 23, 2024) was an American professional football player who was a wide receiver in the National Football League (NFL) for the Dallas Cowboys and Chicago Bears. He played college football for the BYU Cougars and Hawaii Rainbow Warriors.

== Early life ==
Born and raised in Utah, Richards attended Granite High School in South Salt Lake, where he received all-state honors in three sports (football, basketball, track). In football, he joined his brother Doug Richards and played fullback for the Farmers, and led the track & field team to the class 'A' state title in 1969, Granite's first in a quarter century. In basketball, he played guard and was named second-team all-state.

Recruited by several university division programs, Richards decided to attend the University of Utah in Salt Lake City, but his church bishop influenced him to attend Brigham Young University (BYU) in Provo instead of serving on a mission.

From the start, he was the fastest player for the Cougars and wore number 22 in honor of Bob Hayes. As a sophomore in 1970, Richards led BYU in receiving with 36 receptions for 513 yards (fifth among WAC receivers) and a touchdown. In 1971, he again led the team in receiving with 14 receptions for 287 yards and one touchdown. He also had 33 punt returns for 624 yards (17.9 average) and four touchdowns, 23 kickoff returns for 468 yards (19.8 average). He led the nation in punt returns and was sixteenth in all-purpose yards. Richards set four university division records with most punt return yards (219 against North Texas State) in a game, most kickoff returns (247 yards, 7 returns) in a game, average per kickoff return (35.3 yards) in a season and tied the record for most touchdowns (4) on punt returns in a season. He received All-WAC honors.

The combination of being ruled academically ineligible and BYU's run-oriented offense, led to his decision to transfer to the University of Hawaii for his senior season. With the Rainbows in 1972, he had 23 receptions for 414 yards and five touchdowns, before injuring his knee.

== Professional career ==
=== Dallas Cowboys ===
Selected by the Dallas Cowboys in the second round (46th overall) of the 1973 NFL draft, Richards was the fastest player on the team his rookie season and played mostly on special teams. In the NFC Championship loss at home to the Minnesota Vikings on December 30, he returned a punt 63 yards for the Cowboys' sole touchdown.

In 1974, Richards was named the starter at wide receiver over Bob Hayes. He was the team's long threat (with receptions of 52, 58, 46, and 43 yards) and had his best statistical year with 26 receptions for 467 yards (18 average) and five touchdowns. In his third year, he had 21 receptions for 451 yards (21.5 average) and four touchdowns. In 1976, he had 19 receptions for 414 yards (21.8 average) and three touchdowns, missing three games because of a hamstring injury.

The next season in 1977, his fourth straight as a starter, Richards alternated with Butch Johnson, recording 17 receptions for 225 yards (13.2 average) and three touchdowns. In the 27–10 win over the Denver Broncos in Super Bowl XII, he had his most notable career highlight, catching a 29-yard pass from fullback Robert Newhouse in the fourth quarter for the game's final score.It was the first touchdown thrown by a non-quarterback in Super Bowl history.

With the emergence of Tony Hill, Richards lost his starting position and was traded in early September to the Chicago Bears, in exchange for a fifth round draft choice (#121-Bob Hukill) in 1979 and a third round pick (#78-Bill Roe) in 1980.

=== Chicago Bears ===
In 1978, Richards had a career-high 27 receptions with the Bears. The next season, he played in only five games; he was hindered by knee injury suffered on September 30 while blocking on Walter Payton's 65-yard touchdown reception against divisional foe Tampa Bay, although he completed the game. His contract wasn't renewed after he was placed on the injured reserve list.

=== Denver Broncos ===
On May 8, 1980, Richards signed as a free agent with the Denver Broncos, but suffered a second straight season-ending injury. He was placed on the injured reserve list in August, and retired without playing a regular season game for the Broncos.

== Personal life ==
Richards was the host and co-producer of a hunting and fishing show for ESPN called ESPN Outdoors. He was mentioned in the King of the Hill episodes "A Beer Can Named Desire" and "Cops and Robert". His post-NFL life also included drug addiction, alcoholism, three divorces, and arrests for forgery.

In 2011, he was diagnosed with Parkinson's disease, with doctors believing a combination of hits from football and his drug usage to be the cause. He lived with his two sons, Goldie and Jordan.

Richards died from congestive heart failure on February 23, 2024, at the age of 73.

== See also ==
- List of NCAA major college yearly punt and kickoff return leaders
