= 1981 Dallas Cowboys season =

NFL team season

- Owner: Clint Murchison, Jr.
- General manager: Tex Schramm
- Head coach: Tom Landry
- Defensive coordinator: Ernie Stautner
- Home stadium: Texas Stadium

Results
- Record: 12–4
- Division place: 1st NFC East
- Playoffs: Won Divisional Playoffs (vs. Buccaneers) 38–0; Lost NFC Championship (at 49ers) 27–28

The 1981 Dallas Cowboys season was their 22nd in the league. The team matched their previous output of 12–4, winning their fifth division title in six years. They lost the Conference Championship game for the second straight season.

The season began with four straight victories, followed by two losses (including a surprising 45–14 blowout loss to the 49ers in week six). The Cowboys rebounded to win 8 of their last 9 games to clinch the NFC East but had to settle for the conference's number two seed behind the 49ers.

The Cowboys easily defeated Tampa Bay in the divisional playoff to earn a rematch with the 49ers in the NFC Championship Game. The game was much closer this time, and the Cowboys still held a 27–21 lead with less than a minute to play. However, Joe Montana led a late drive and hit Dwight Clark in the famous "Catch" to give San Francisco a 28–27 lead. On the ensuing Cowboys possession, Danny White completed a pass to Drew Pearson, and was only an arm's length away from breaking free from Eric Wright and most likely scoring a touchdown. Jim Stuckey recovered a White fumble on the next play, then the 49ers ran out the clock for the win.

== Offseason ==
=== NFL draft ===
1981 Dallas Cowboys draft
Round	Pick	Player	Position	College	Notes
1	26	Howard Richards	OT	Missouri	
2	53	Doug Donley	WR	Ohio State	
3	81	Glen Titensor	OG	BYU	
4	91	Scott Pelluer	LB	Washington State	from San Francisco
4	108	Derrie Nelson	LB	Nebraska	
5	137	Danny Spradlin	LB	Tennessee	
6	163	Vince Skillings	DB	Ohio State	
7	173	Ron Fellows	CB	Missouri	
7	191	Ken Miller	DB	Eastern Michigan	
8	218	Paul Piurowski	LB	Florida State	
9	246	Mike Wilson	WR	Washington State	
10	273	Pat Graham	DT	California	
11	302	Tim Morrison	OG	Georgia	
12	329	Nate Lundy	WR	Indiana	
Made roster † Pro Football Hall of Fame * Made at least one Pro Bowl during career

=== Undrafted free agents ===
1981 undrafted free agents of note
Player	Position	College
Michael Downs	Safety	Rice
Angelo King	Linebacker	South Carolina State
Everson Walls	Cornerback	Grambling State
Steve Wright	Tackle	Northern Iowa

== Roster ==
Dallas Cowboys 1981 roster
Quarterbacks: 18 Glenn Carano; 14 Gary Hogeboom; 11 Danny White P; Running backs: 33 Tony Dorsett; 23 James Jones; 44 Robert Newhouse; 30 Timmy Newsome; 20 Ron Springs; Wide receivers: 83 Doug Donley; 80 Tony Hill; 86 Butch Johnson; 88 Drew Pearson; Tight ends: 84 Doug Cosbie; 89 Billy Joe DuPree; 87 Jay Saldi	Offensive linemen: 61 Jim Cooper T; 67 Pat Donovan T; 71 Andy Frederick T; 65 Kurt Petersen G; 64 Tom Rafferty C/G; 70 Howard Richards G/T; 68 Herbert Scott G; 63 Glen Titensor G/C; 73 Steve Wright T; Defensive linemen: 76 Larry Bethea DT; 78 John Dutton DT; 72 Ed Jones DE; 79 Harvey Martin DE; 77 Bruce Thornton DE; 54 Randy White DT	Linebackers: 53 Bob Breunig MLB; 59 Guy Brown OLB; 51 Anthony Dickerson OLB; 58 Mike Hegman OLB; 57 Angelo King OLB; 50 D. D. Lewis OLB; 55 Danny Spradlin MLB; Defensive backs: 31 Benny Barnes FS; 26 Michael Downs FS; 27 Ron Fellows CB; 32 Dennis Thurman CB; 24 Everson Walls CB; 41 Charlie Waters SS; 45 Steve Wilson CB; Special teams: 1 Rafael Septién K	Reserve lists: 47 Dextor Clinkscale S (IR); 62 John Fitzgerald C (IR); 42 Randy Hughes S (IR); 56 Bill Roe LB (IR); 52 Robert Shaw C (IR); 60 Don Smerek DE (IR); 75 Ron Spears DE (IR); 66 Norm Wells G (IR); Rookies in italics 45 active, 8 inactive

== Schedule ==
Week	Date	Opponent	Result	Record	Game Site	Attendance	Recap
1	September 6	at **Washington Redskins**	**W** 26–10	1–0	RFK Stadium	55,045	Recap
2	September 13	**St. Louis Cardinals**	**W** 30–17	2–0	Texas Stadium	63,602	Recap
3	September 21	at New England Patriots	**W** 35–21	3–0	Schaefer Stadium	60,311	Recap
4	September 27	**New York Giants**	**W** 18–10	4–0	Texas Stadium	63,449	Recap
5	October 4	at **St. Louis Cardinals**	**L** 17–20	4–1	Busch Memorial Stadium	49,477	Recap
6	October 11	at San Francisco 49ers	**L** 14–45	4–2	Candlestick Park	57,574	Recap
7	October 18	Los Angeles Rams	**W** 29–17	5–2	Texas Stadium	64,649	Recap
8	October 25	Miami Dolphins	**W** 28–27	6–2	Texas Stadium	64,221	Recap
9	November 1	at **Philadelphia Eagles**	**W** 17–14	7–2	Veterans Stadium	72,111	Recap
10	November 9	Buffalo Bills	**W** 27–14	8–2	Texas Stadium	62,583	Recap
11	November 15	at Detroit Lions	**L** 24–27	8–3	Pontiac Silverdome	79,694	Recap
12	November 22	**Washington Redskins**	**W** 24–10	9–3	Texas Stadium	64,587	Recap
13	November 26	Chicago Bears	**W** 10–9	10–3	Texas Stadium	63,499	Recap
14	December 6	at Baltimore Colts	**W** 37–13	11–3	Memorial Stadium	54,871	Recap
15	December 13	**Philadelphia Eagles**	**W** 21–10	12–3	Texas Stadium	64,955	Recap
16	December 19	at **New York Giants**	**L** 10–13 (OT)	12–4	Giants Stadium	73,009	Recap

Division opponents are in bold text

== Game notes ==
=== Week 1 ===
Team	1	2	3	4	Total
• Cowboys	0	14	6	6	26
Redskins	0	7	3	0	10

- Date: Sunday Sept 6, 1981
- Location: Robert F. Kennedy Memorial Stadium
- Game start: 1:00 p.m. EST
- Game attendance: 55,045
- Game weather: 75 °F (24 °C), wind 8 mph (13 km/h)
- Referee: Gene Barth
- TV announcers (CBS): Frank Glieber and Roger Staubach

=== Week 2 ===
Team	1	2	3	4	Total
Cardinals	7	7	0	3	17
• Cowboys	14	13	3	0	30

- Date: Sunday Sep 13, 1981
- Location: Texas Stadium
- Game start: 4:00 p.m. EST
- Game attendance: 63,602
- Game weather: 82 °F (28 °C), wind 9 mph (14 km/h)
- Referee: Pat Haggerty
- TV announcers (CBS): Frank Glieber and Roger Staubach

=== Week 3 ===
Team	1	2	3	4	Total
• Cowboys	7	10	7	11	35
Patriots	7	7	7	0	21

- Date: Monday Sept 21, 1981
- Location: Schaefer Stadium
- Game start: 9:00 p.m. EST
- Game attendance: 60,311
- Game weather: 62 °F (17 °C), wind 13 mph (21 km/h)
- Referee: Jerry Markbreit
- TV announcers (ABC): Frank Gifford, Don Meredith & Howard Cosell

=== Week 4 ===
Team	1	2	3	4	Total
Giants	0	3	0	7	10
• Cowboys	7	3	0	8	18

- Date: Sunday Sep 27, 1981
- Location: Texas Stadium
- Game start: 4:00 p.m. EST
- Game attendance: 63,449
- Game weather: 82 °F (28 °C), wind 10 mph (16 km/h)
- TV announcers (CBS): Pat Summerall & Hank Stram

=== Week 5 ===
Team	1	2	3	4	Total
Cowboys	7	3	7	0	17
• Cardinals	10	0	7	3	20

- Date: Sunday Oct 4,1981
- Location: Civic Center Busch Memorial Stadium
- Game start: 1:00 p.m. EST
- Game attendance: 49,477
- Game weather: Clear; 64 °F (18 °C), wind 12 mph (19 km/h)
- Referee: Chuck Heberling
- TV announcers (CBS): Pat Summerall and John Madden

=== Week 6 ===
Team	1	2	3	4	Total
Cowboys	0	7	0	7	14
• 49ers	21	3	14	7	45

- Date: Sunday Oct 11, 1981
- Location: Candlestick Park
- Game start: 4:00 p.m. EST
- Game attendance: 57,574
- Game weather: Sunny; 58 °F (14 °C), wind 18 mph (29 km/h)
- Referee: Jim Tunney
- TV announcers (CBS): Pat Summerall and John Madden

=== Week 7 ===
Team	1	2	3	4	Total
Rams	0	10	7	0	17
• Cowboys	12	14	0	3	29

- Date: Sunday Oct 18, 1981
- Location: Texas Stadium
- Game start: 9:00 p.m. EST
- Game attendance: 64,649
- Game weather: 64 °F (18 °C), humidity 55%
- Referee: Gene Barth
- TV announcers (ABC): Frank Gifford, Fran Tarkenton, and Don Meredith

=== Week 8 ===
Team	1	2	3	4	Total
Dolphins	0	6	7	14	27
• Cowboys	7	7	0	14	28

- Date: Sunday Oct 25, 1981
- Location: Texas Stadium
- Game start: 4:00 p.m. EST
- Game attendance: 64,221
- Game weather: 54 °F (12 °C), humidity 74%
- Referee: Fred Wyant
- TV announcers (NBC): Dick Enberg and Merlin Olsen

=== Week 9 ===
Team	1	2	3	4	Total
• Cowboys	0	3	0	14	17
Eagles	0	7	7	0	14

- Date: Sunday Nov 1, 1981
- Location: Veterans Stadium
- Game start: 4:00 p.m. EST
- Game attendance: 72,111
- Game weather: 53 °F (12 °C), wind 6 mph (9.7 km/h)
- Referee: Jerry Seeman
- TV announcers (CBS): Pat Summerall & John Madden

=== Week 10 ===
Team	1	2	3	4	Total
Bills	7	7	0	0	14
• Cowboys	7	0	20	0	27

- Date: November 9
- Location: Texas Stadium, Irving, Texas
- Game start: 9:00 p.m. EST
- Game attendance: 62,583
- Game weather: 50 °F (10 °C) • 20 miles per hour (32 km/h; 17 kn)
- Referee: Dick Jorgensen
- TV announcers (ABC): Frank Gifford, Don Meredith, and Howard Cosell

Scoring summary
1	BUF	Jerry Butler 16 yard pass from Joe Ferguson (Nick Mike-Mayer kick)	BUF 7–0
1	DAL	Doug Cosbie 12 yard pass from Danny White (Rafael Septién kick)	Tied 7–7
2	BUF	Curtis Brown 9 yard pass from Joe Cribbs (Nick Mike-Mayer kick)	BUF 14–7
3	DAL	Tony Dorsett 73 yard pass from Danny White (Rafael Septién kick)	Tied 14–14
3	DAL	Tony Hill 37 yard pass from Danny White (Rafael Septién kick)	DAL 21–14
3	DAL	Rafael Septién 47 yard field goal	DAL 24–14
3	DAL	Rafael Septién 31 yard field goal	DAL 27–14

=== Week 11 ===
Team	1	2	3	4	Total
Cowboys	7	10	0	7	24
• Lions	0	7	10	10	27

- Date: Sunday Nov 15, 1981
- Location: Pontiac Silverdome
- Game start: 4:00 p.m. EST
- Game attendance: 79,694
- Game weather: Dome
- Referee: Fred Silva
- TV announcers (CBS): Pat Summerall and John Madden

=== Week 12 ===
Team	1	2	3	4	Total
Redskins	0	7	3	0	10
• Cowboys	7	3	7	7	24

- Date: Sunday, November 22, 1981
- Location: Texas Stadium, Irving, Texas
- Game start: 3:00 p.m.
- Game attendance: 64,587
- Game weather: 51 °F (11 °C); wind 7 mph (11 km/h)
- Referee: Dick Jorgensen
- TV announcers (CBS): Tom Brookshier and Roger Staubach

Scoring summary
1	DAL	Butch Johnson 28 yard pass from Danny White (Rafael Septién kick)	DAL 7–0
2	DAL	Rafael Septién 25 yard field goal	DAL 10–0
2	WSH	Nick Giaquinto 7 yard pass from Joe Theismann (Mark Moseley kick)	DAL 10–7
3	WSH	Mark Moseley 26 yard field goal	Tie 10–10
3	DAL	Doug Cosbie 10 yard pass from Danny White (Rafael Septién kick)	DAL 17–10
4	DAL	Ron Springs 1 yard run (Rafael Septién kick)	DAL 24–10

=== Week 13 ===
Team	1	2	3	4	Total
Bears	0	3	0	6	9
• Cowboys	3	0	0	7	10

- Date: Thursday Nov, 26 1981
- Location: Texas Stadium, Irving, Texas
- Game start: 4:00 p.m.
- Game attendance: 63,499
- Game weather: 68 °F (20 °C); humidity 62%
- Referee: Chuck Heberling
- TV announcers (CBS): Pat Summerall and John Madden

=== Week 14 ===
Team	1	2	3	4	Total
• Cowboys	17	10	0	10	37
Colts	6	0	7	0	13

- Date: Sunday Dec 6, 1981
- Location: Memorial Stadium, Baltimore, Maryland
- Game start: 2:00 p.m. EST
- Game attendance: 54,871
- Game weather: 39 °F (4 °C), wind 20 mph (32 km/h), wind chill 29 °F (−2 °C)
- Referee: Ben Dreith
- TV announcers (CBS): Jim Kelly & John Dockery

=== Week 15 ===
Team	1	2	3	4	Total
Eagles	3	7	0	0	10
• Cowboys	0	7	7	7	21

- Date: Sunday Dec 13, 1981
- Location: Texas Stadium, Irving, Texas
- Game start: 4:00 p.m. EST
- Game attendance: 64,955
- Game weather: 44 °F (7 °C), humidity 83%, wind 9 mph (14 km/h)
- Referee: Jerry Markbreit
- TV announcers (CBS): Pat Summerall and John Madden

=== Week 16 ===
Team	1	2	3	4	OT	Total
Cowboys	0	0	0	10	0	10
• Giants	0	0	7	3	3	13

- Date: Saturday Dec 19,1981
- Location: Giants Stadium
- Game start: 12:30 p.m. EST
- Game attendance: 73,009
- Game weather: Overcast; 27 °F (−3 °C), wind chill 13 °F (−11 °C), wind 20 mph (32 km/h)mph
- Referee: Pat Haggerty
- TV announcers (CBS): Pat Summerall and John Madden

Scoring summary
3	NYG	Tom Mullady 20 yard pass from Scott Brunner (Joe Danelo kick)	Giants 7–0
4	DAL	Doug Cosbie 3 yard pass from Danny White (Rafael Septién kick)	Tie 7–7
4	DAL	Rafael Septién 36 yard field goal	Cowboys 10–7
4	NYG	Joe Danelo 40 yard field goal	Tie 10–10
OT	NYG	Joe Danelo 35 yard field goal	Giants 13–10

== Playoffs ==
Round	Date	Opponent	Result	Game Site	Attendance	Recap
Wild Card	First Round Bye					
Divisional	January 2, 1982	Tampa Bay Buccaneers (3)	W 38–0	Texas Stadium	64,848	Recap
NFC Championship	January 10, 1982	at San Francisco 49ers (1)	L 27–28	Candlestick Park	60,525	Recap

=== Divisional Round ===
Team	1	2	3	4	Total
Bucs	0	0	0	0	0
• Cowboys	0	10	21	7	38

- Date: Jan 2,1982
- Location: Texas Stadium
- Game start: 1:00 p.m. EST
- Game attendance: 64,848
- Game weather: Sunny; 57 °F (14 °C)
- Referee: Jerry Markbreit

=== Conference Championship ===
Team	1	2	3	4	Total
Cowboys	10	7	0	10	27
• 49ers	7	7	7	7	28

- Date: Jan 10,1982
- Location: Candlestick Park
- Game start: 4:30 p.m. EST
- Game attendance: 60,525
- Game weather: Sunny; 43 °F (6 °C), wind 5 mph (8.0 km/h)
- Referee: Jim Tunney
- TV announcers (CBS): Vin Scully (play-by-play), Hank Stram (color commentator), Irv Cross (sideline reporter)

== Standings ==
NFC East
	W	L	T	PCT	DIV	CONF	PF	PA	STK
Dallas Cowboys^{(2)}	12	4	0	.750	6–2	8–4	367	277	L1
Philadelphia Eagles^{(4)}	10	6	0	.625	4–4	7–5	368	221	W1
New York Giants^{(5)}	9	7	0	.563	5–3	8–6	295	257	W3
Washington Redskins	8	8	0	.500	3–5	6–6	347	349	W3
St. Louis Cardinals	7	9	0	.438	2–6	4–8	315	408	L2
