= 1982 Dallas Cowboys season =

NFL team season

- Owner: Clint Murchison, Jr.
- General manager: Tex Schramm
- Head coach: Tom Landry
- Defensive coordinator: Ernie Stautner
- Home stadium: Texas Stadium

Results
- Record: 6–3
- Division place: 2nd NFC (also 2nd NFC East)
- Playoffs: Won Wild Card Playoffs (vs. Buccaneers) 30–17; Won Divisional Playoffs (vs. Packers) 37–26; Lost NFC Championship (at Redskins) 17–31
- Pro Bowlers: 8

The 1982 Dallas Cowboys season was the franchise's 23rd season in the National Football League. The Cowboys finished with a record of 6–3, placing them second in the NFC. It was the Cowboys 17th consecutive winning season, breaking the mark of 16 set by the Raiders. Dallas would eventually extend the record to 20 consecutive winning seasons. Only one team, the New England Patriots from 2001–2019 with 19 consecutive winning seasons has come the closest to matching it. After losing the season opener to the Pittsburgh Steelers (the first time the Cowboys lost a season opener in 17 years), the Cowboys won the next six, including five after the strike had ended. However, two losses at the end of the regular season cost them home-field advantage throughout the playoffs. After beginning their playoff run with victories over the Buccaneers 30–17 and the Packers 37–26, the Cowboys traveled to Washington, where they met defeat at the hands of their arch-rival, the Redskins 31–17. It was the third straight season that the Cowboys lost in the NFC championship game. The Redskins would advance and won Super Bowl XVII.

The Cowboys featured big-play capability on both sides of the ball in 1982. The offense relied on running back Tony Dorsett, who led the NFC in rushing (and during the season set an NFL record with a 99-yard run from scrimmage against Minnesota), and quarterback Danny White, who finished second in the NFL in passer rating. Despite the retirement of longtime starters Charlie Waters and D.D. Lewis before the season, the Cowboys still tied for the NFC lead in sacks, and cornerback Everson Walls led the league with seven interceptions.

The Cowboys were the only team to defeat the Redskins in the 1982 season, winning a regular season matchup in Game 5 at RFK Stadium (the scheduled meeting at Texas Stadium was cancelled by the strike). The Cowboys were also the only team in the NFL who never trailed at halftime in '82.

For the only time in franchise history, Dallas did not play the New York Giants, as both meetings fell victim to the strike.

== Offseason ==
Tex Schramm and Gil Brandt, proposed to the NFL competition committee a centralization of the evaluation process for the NFL draft prospects. Before this, teams had to schedule individual visits with players to run them through drills and tests. This proposition created the NFL Scouting Combine, which was first held in Tampa, Florida, in 1982.

Coincidentally, the 1982 NFL draft was one of the worst in Dallas Cowboys history. It is mostly remembered because it was the year the Cowboys drafted cornerback Rod Hill in the first round. Hill would go on to become the symbol of the team's failed draft strategy of the eighties, when the Cowboys took too many gambles. From that draft only Jeff Rohrer and Phil Pozderac made contributions.

=== NFL draft ===
1982 Dallas Cowboys draft
Round	Pick	Player	Position	College	Notes
1	25	Rod Hill	CB	Kentucky State	
2	53	Jeff Rohrer	LB	Yale	
3	81	Jim Eliopulos	LB	Wyoming	
4	101	Brian Carpenter	CB	Michigan	
4	109	Monty Hunter	S	Salem	
5	137	Phil Pozderac	OT	Notre Dame	
6	143	Ken Hammond	OG	Vanderbilt	
6	165	Charles Daum	DT	Cal Poly	
7	193	Bill Purifoy	DE	Tulsa	
8	216	George Peoples	RB	Auburn	
8	221	Dwight Sullivan	RB	North Carolina State	
9	249	Joe Gary	DT	UCLA	
10	277	Todd Eckerson	OT	North Carolina State	
11	295	George Thompson	WR	Albany State	
11	304	Michael Whiting	RB	Florida State	
12	332	Rich Burtness	OG	Montana	
Made roster † Pro Football Hall of Fame * Made at least one Pro Bowl during career

=== Undrafted free agents ===
1982 undrafted free agents of note
Player	Position	College
Al Strandberg	Linebacker	Minnesota State-Moorhead

== Regular season ==
=== Schedule ===
Week	Date	Opponent	Result	Record	Game Site	Attendance	Recap
1	September 13	Pittsburgh Steelers	**L** 28–36	0–1	Texas Stadium	63,431	Recap
2	September 19	at **St. Louis Cardinals**	**W** 24–7	1–1	Busch Stadium	50,705	Recap
3	—N/a	at Minnesota Vikings	Rescheduled to January 3				
4	—N/a	New York Giants	Cancelled due to the 1982 NFL strike				
5	—N/a	Washington Redskins	Cancelled due to the 1982 NFL strike				
6	—N/a	at Philadelphia Eagles	Cancelled due to the 1982 NFL strike				
7	—N/a	at Cincinnati Bengals	Cancelled due to the 1982 NFL strike				
8	—N/a	at New York Giants	Cancelled due to the 1982 NFL strike				
9	—N/a	St. Louis Cardinals	Cancelled due to the 1982 NFL strike				
10	—N/a	at San Francisco 49ers	Cancelled due to the 1982 NFL strike				
11	November 21	Tampa Bay Buccaneers	**W** 14–9	2–1	Texas Stadium	49,578	Recap
12	November 25	Cleveland Browns	**W** 31–14	3–1	Texas Stadium	46,267	Recap
13	December 5	at **Washington Redskins**	**W** 24–10	4–1	RFK Stadium	54,633	Recap
14	December 13	at Houston Oilers	**W** 37–7	5–1	Houston Astrodome	51,808	Recap
15	December 19	New Orleans Saints	**W** 21–7	6–1	Texas Stadium	64,506	Recap
16	December 26	**Philadelphia Eagles**	**L** 20–24	6–2	Texas Stadium	46,199	Recap
17	January 3, 1983	at Minnesota Vikings	**L** 27–31	6–3	Hubert H. Humphrey Metrodome	60,007	Recap
Note: Intra-division opponents are in **bold** text.

=== Season summary ===
==== Week 1: vs Pittsburgh Steelers ====
Week One: Pittsburgh Steelers (0–0) at Dallas Cowboys (0–0)

Quarter	1	2	3	4	Total
**Steelers**	6	7	17	6	**36**
Cowboys	7	7	0	14	**28**

at Texas Stadium, Irving, Texas

- Date: September 13, 1982
- Game time: 9:00 p.m. EST
- Game weather: 84 °F (28.9 °C)
- Game attendance: 63,431
- Referee: Pat Haggerty
- TV announcers (ABC): Frank Gifford, Don Meredith & Howard Cosell

Game information

**First quarter**

- PIT – John Stallworth 8-yard pass from Terry Bradshaw (kick failed). Steelers 6–0. Drive:
- DAL – Drew Pearson 4-yard pass from Danny White (Rafael Septién kick). Cowboys 7–6. Drive:

**Second quarter**

- PIT – Jim Smith 7-yard pass from Terry Bradshaw (Gary Anderson kick). Steelers 13–7. Drive:
- DAL – Doug Cosbie 12-yard pass from Danny White (Rafael Septién kick). Cowboys 14–13. Drive:

**Third quarter**

- PIT – Frank Pollard 1-yard run (Gary Anderson kick). Steelers 20–14. Drive:
- PIT – Jim Smith 15-yard pass from Terry Bradshaw (Gary Anderson kick). Steelers 27–14. Drive:
- PIT – Gary Anderson 26-yard field goal. Steelers 30–14. Drive:

**Fourth quarter**

- PIT – Gary Anderson 43–yard field goal. Steelers 33–14. Drive:
- DAL – Tony Hill 45-yard pass from Danny White (Rafael Septién kick). Steelers 33–21. Drive:
- DAL – Billy Joe DuPree 5-yard pass from Danny White (Rafael Septién kick). Steelers 33–28. Drive:
- PIT – Gary Anderson 40-yard field goal. Steelers 36–28. Drive:

Top passers

- PIT – Terry Bradshaw – 17/28, 246 yards, 3 TD
- DAL – Danny White – 25/36, 347 yards, 4 TD, 2 INT

Top rushers

- PIT – Franco Harris – 24 rushes, 103 yards
- DAL – Tony Dorsett – 11 rushes, 30 yards

Top receivers

- PIT – John Stallworth – 7 receptions, 137 yards, TD
- DAL – Tony Hill – 6 receptions, 130 yards, TD

==== Week 13: at Washington Redskins ====
Dallas Cowboys (3–1) at Washington Redskins (4–0)

Quarter	1	2	3	4	Total
**Cowboys**	0	7	10	7	**24**
Redskins	0	0	0	10	**10**

at RFK Stadium, Washington, D.C.

- Date: December 5, 1982
- Game weather: 64 °F (17.8 °C), wind 9 miles per hour (14 km/h; 7.8 kn)
- Referee: Jerry Markbreit
- TV announcers (CBS): Pat Summerall and John Madden

Scoring summary

Quarter	Time	Drive			Team	Scoring information	Score	
Quarter	Time	Plays	Yards	TOP	Team	Scoring information	DAL	WAS
2					Cowboys	Ron Springs 8-yard touchdown reception from Danny White, Rafael Septién kick good	7	0
3					Cowboys	31-yard field goal by Rafael Septién	10	0
3					Cowboys	Timmy Newsome 18-yard touchdown run, Rafael Septién kick good	17	0
4					Redskins	38-yard field goal by Mark Moseley	17	3
4					Redskins	Charlie Brown 17-yard touchdown reception from Joe Theismann, Mark Moseley kick good	17	10
4					Cowboys	Ron Springs 46-yard touchdown run, Rafael Septién kick good	24	10
"TOP" = time of possession. For other American football terms, see Glossary of American football.							24	10

== Standings ==
NFC East
	W	L	T	PCT	DIV	CONF	PF	PA	STK
^{(1)} Washington Redskins	8	1	0	.889	6–1	8–1	190	128	W4
^{(2)} Dallas Cowboys	6	3	0	.667	2–1	4–2	226	145	L2
^{(6)} St. Louis Cardinals	5	4	0	.556	3–1	5–4	135	170	L1
New York Giants	4	5	0	.444	2–3	3–5	164	160	W1
Philadelphia Eagles	3	6	0	.333	1–5	1–5	191	195	L1

NFC
#	Team	W	L	T	PCT	PF	PA	STK
Seeded postseason qualifiers
1	Washington Redskins	8	1	0	.889	190	128	W4
2	Dallas Cowboys	6	3	0	.667	226	145	L2
3	Green Bay Packers	5	3	1	.611	226	169	L1
4 (Note: Minnesota (4–1), Atlanta (4–3), St. Louis (5–4), Tampa Bay (3–3) seeds were determined by best won-lost record in conference games.)	Minnesota Vikings	5	4	0	.556	187	198	W1
5	Atlanta Falcons	5	4	0	.556	183	199	L2
6	St. Louis Cardinals	5	4	0	.556	135	170	L1
7	Tampa Bay Buccaneers	5	4	0	.556	158	178	W3
8 (Note: Detroit finished ahead of New Orleans and the N.Y. Giants based on best conference record (4–4 to Saints’ 3–5 to Giants’ 3–5).)	Detroit Lions	4	5	0	.444	181	176	W1
Did not qualify for the postseason
9	New Orleans Saints	4	5	0	.444	129	160	W1
10	New York Giants	4	5	0	.444	164	160	W1
11 (Note: San Francisco finished ahead of Chicago, and Chicago finished ahead of Philadelphia, based on conference record (49ers’ 2–3 to Bears’ 2–5 to Eagles’ 1–5).)	San Francisco 49ers	3	6	0	.333	209	206	L1
12	Chicago Bears	3	6	0	.333	141	174	L1
13	Philadelphia Eagles	3	6	0	.333	191	195	L1
14	Los Angeles Rams	2	7	0	.222	200	250	W1
Tiebreakers

=== Roster ===
Dallas Cowboys 1982 roster
Quarterbacks: 18 Glenn Carano; 14 Gary Hogeboom; 11 Danny White P; 15 Brad Wright; Running backs: 33 Tony Dorsett; 23 James Jones; 44 Robert Newhouse; 30 Timmy Newsome; 22 George Peoples; 20 Ron Springs; Wide receivers: 83 Doug Donley; 80 Tony Hill; 86 Butch Johnson; 88 Drew Pearson; Tight ends: 84 Doug Cosbie; 89 Billy Joe DuPree; 87 Jay Saldi	Offensive linemen: 62 Brian Baldinger C/G; 61 Jim Cooper T; 67 Pat Donovan T; 65 Kurt Petersen G; 75 Phil Pozderac T; 64 Tom Rafferty C; 70 Howard Richards G; 68 Herbert Scott G; 63 Glen Titensor G/C; 73 Steve Wright G; Defensive linemen: 76 Larry Bethea DE; 78 John Dutton DT; 72 Ed Jones DE; 79 Harvey Martin DE; 60 Don Smerek DT; 54 Randy White DT	Linebackers: 53 Bob Breunig MLB; 59 Guy Brown OLB; 51 Anthony Dickerson OLB; 58 Mike Hegman OLB; 57 Angelo King OLB; 50 Jeff Rohrer OLB; 55 Danny Spradlin MLB; Defensive backs: 31 Benny Barnes SS; 26 Michael Downs FS; 47 Dextor Clinkscale SS; 27 Ron Fellows CB; 25 Rod Hill CB; 34 Monty Hunter FS; 32 Dennis Thurman CB; 24 Everson Walls CB; Special teams: 1 Rafael Septién K	Reserve lists: -- Jim Eliopulos LB (IR); -- Scott McLean LB (IR); 52 Robert Shaw C (IR); 66 Norm Wells G (IR); Rookies in italics 49 active, 4 inactive

== Postseason ==
=== Playoff schedule ===
Week	Date	Opponent	Result	Game Site	Attendance	Recap
First Round	January 9, 1983	Tampa Bay Buccaneers (7)	W 30–17	Texas Stadium	65,042	Recap
Second Round	January 16, 1983	Green Bay Packers (3)	W 37–26	Texas Stadium	63,972	Recap
NFC Championship	January 22, 1983	at Washington Redskins (1)	L 17–31	RFK Stadium	55,045	Recap

==== First round ====
Tampa Bay Buccaneers vs. Dallas Cowboys – Game summary

Quarter	1	2	3	4	Total
Buccaneers	0	10	7	0	17
Cowboys	6	7	3	14	30

at Texas Stadium, Irving, Texas

- Game time: 4:00 p.m. EST/3:00 p.m. CST
- Game weather: 65 °F (18 °C), sunny
- Game attendance: 65,042
- Referee: Dick Jorgensen
- TV announcers (CBS): Pat Summerall (play-by-play) and John Madden (color commentator)

Game information
- Scoring
  - DAL – field goal Septién 33 DAL 3–0
  - DAL – field goal Septién 33 DAL 6–0
  - TB – Green 60 fumble return (Capece kick)TB 7–6
  - TB – field goal Capece 32 TB 10–6
  - DAL – Springs 6 pass from D. White (Septién kick) DAL 13–10
  - DAL – field goal Septién 19 DAL 16–10
  - TB – Jones 49 pass from Williams (Capece kick) TB 17–16
  - DAL – Hunter 19 interception return (Septién kick) DAL 23–17
  - DAL – Newsome 10 pass from D. White (Septién kick) DAL 30–17

==== Second round ====
Team	1	2	3	4	Total
Packers	0	7	6	13	26
• Cowboys	6	14	3	14	37

- Date: January 16
- Location: Texas Stadium, Irving, Texas
- Game start: 3:00 p.m.
- Game attendance: 63,972
- Game weather: 38 °F (3 °C); wind 7 mph (11 km/h)
- Referee: Gene Barth
- Television network: CBS

Scoring summary
1	DAL	Rafael Septién 50 yard field goal	DAL 3–0
1	DAL	Rafael Septién 34 yard field goal	DAL 6–0
2	GB	James Lofton 6 yard pass from Lynn Dickey (Jan Stenerud kick)	GB 7–6
2	DAL	Timmy Newsome 2 yard run (Rafael Septién kick)	DAL 13–7
2	DAL	Dennis Thurman 39 yard interception return (Rafael Septién kick)	DAL 20–7
3	GB	Jan Stenerud 30 yard field goal	DAL 20–10
3	GB	Jan Stenerud 33 yard field goal	DAL 20–13
3	DAL	Rafael Septién 24 yard field goal	DAL 23–13
4	GB	James Lofton 71 yard run (kick failed)	DAL 23–19
4	DAL	Doug Cosbie 7 yard pass from Danny White (Rafael Septién kick)	DAL 30–19
4	GB	Mark Lee 22 yard interception return (Jan Stenerud kick)	DAL 30–26
4	DAL	Robert Newhouse 1 yard run (Rafael Septién kick)	DAL 37–26

This would be the Cowboys last playoff win until they defeated the Chicago Bears in the 1991 NFC Wildcard round.

== Awards ==
- The Cowboys sent eight players to the Pro Bowl following the 1982 season: Bob Breunig, Pat Donovan, Tony Dorsett, Ed Jones, Harvey Martin, Herbert Scott, Everson Walls, and Randy White.
- Danny White and Tony Dorsett were named to the All-NFL second team by the Associated Press at quarterback and running back, respectively. On the defensive side of the ball, end Ed Jones and tackle Randy White were named to the first team, while end Harvey Martin and cornerback Everson Walls were named to the second team.
- Everson Walls, NFL Leader, Interceptions, (7)

== Publications ==
The Football Encyclopedia ISBN 0-312-11435-4
Total Football ISBN 0-06-270170-3
Cowboys Have Always Been My Heroes ISBN 0-446-51950-2
