= 1979 Dallas Cowboys season =

NFL team season

- Owner: Clint Murchison Jr.
- General manager: Tex Schramm
- Head coach: Tom Landry
- Home stadium: Texas Stadium

Results
- Record: 11–5
- Division place: 1st NFC East
- Playoffs: Lost Divisional Playoffs (vs. Rams) 19–21

The 1979 Dallas Cowboys season was their 20th in the National Football League (NFL). The team was unable to improve on their previous output of 12–4, winning eleven games. They qualified for the playoffs, but lost in the divisional round.

The Cowboys still possessed a great offense, but suffered defensive losses as defensive tackle Jethro Pugh retired, safety Charlie Waters missed the season with injury, Ed "Too Tall" Jones left the team while he embarked on a professional boxing career (Jones would return in 1980), and Thomas "Hollywood" Henderson was cut in November for erratic play and behavior. The season began 8–2 before a three-game losing streak placed the season in jeopardy (one of the three being a 30–24 loss to Houston in which Oilers coach Bum Phillips declared the Oilers as "Texas's Team"). The team rallied to win their final three to finish at 11–5 and gain the number one seed in the NFC.

Playing in his final season, Roger Staubach proceeded to have the best year of his career completing 267 passes out of 461 attempts for 3,586 yards and 27 touchdowns with only 11 interceptions with a passer rating of 92.3 and a completion percentage of 57.9.

In the season's final regular season game against the Washington Redskins, with the NFC East Title at issue, Staubach rallied the Cowboys from a 34–21 deficit in the last four minutes to win, 35–34. It turned out to be Staubach's last win. The Cowboys were upset at home in the divisional playoff by the Los Angeles Rams 21–19 and Staubach retired after the season. The last remaining active member of the 1979 Dallas Cowboys was offensive lineman Tom Rafferty, who retired after the 1989 season.

== Offseason ==
=== NFL draft ===
1979 Dallas Cowboys draft
Round	Pick	Player	Position	College	Notes
1	27	Robert Shaw	C	Tennessee	
2	55	Aaron Mitchell	CB	UNLV	
3	76	Doug Cosbie *	TE	Santa Clara	
4	109	Ralph DeLoach	DE	California	
5	121	Bob Hukill	OG	North Carolina	
5	128	Curtis Anderson	DE	Central State	
5	136	Ron Springs	RB	Ohio State	
6	155	Tim Lavender	DB	USC	
6	160	Mike Salzano	OG	North Carolina	
6	164	Chris DeFrance	WR	Arizona State	
7	191	Greg Fitzpatrick	LB	Youngstown State	
8	219	Bruce Thornton	DE	Illinois	
9	247	Garry Cobb	LB	USC	Made the team in 1988
10	274	Mike Calhoun	DT	Notre Dame	
12	329	Quentin Lowry	LB	Youngstown State	
Made roster † Pro Football Hall of Fame * Made at least one Pro Bowl during career

=== Undrafted free agents ===
1979 undrafted free agents of note
Player	Position	College
Ron Brown	Linebacker	Brown
Tom Flynn	Defensive back	Notre Dame
Steve Gibbs	Linebacker	Clemson
Kevin Hill	Wide Receiver	UTEP
Steve Kraus	Quarterback	Westminster
Jon Lazar	Running back	Iowa
Bill Miller	Tackle	Minnesota
Nate Pete	Wide receiver	New Mexico State
Al Pitts	Guard	Michigan State
Mark Snyder	Quarterback	Rice
Paul Suhey	Linebacker	Penn State
Brad Wind	Wide Receiver	Northern Michigan
Will Winters	Linebacker	Utah State

== Roster ==
Dallas Cowboys 1979 roster
Quarterbacks: 18 Glenn Carano; 12 Roger Staubach; 11 Danny White P; Running backs: 36 Larry Brinson; 33 Tony Dorsett; 35 Scott Laidlaw; 44 Robert Newhouse; 26 Preston Pearson; 20 Ron Springs; Wide receivers: 80 Tony Hill; 86 Butch Johnson; 88 Drew Pearson; 81 Steve Wilson; Tight ends: 84 Doug Cosbie; 89 Billy Joe DuPree; 87 Jay Saldi	Offensive linemen: 61 Jim Cooper T; 67 Pat Donovan T; 62 John Fitzgerald C; 71 Andy Frederick T; 66 Burton Lawless G; 64 Tom Rafferty G; 68 Herbert Scott G; 52 Robert Shaw C; 70 Rayfield Wright T; Defensive linemen: 76 Larry Bethea DT; 63 Larry Cole DE/DT; 78 John Dutton DE; 79 Harvey Martin DE; 65 Dave Stalls DT; 77 Bruce Thornton DE; 54 Randy White DT	Linebackers: 53 Bob Breunig MLB; 59 Guy Brown OLB; 58 Mike Hegman OLB; 57 Bruce Huther MLB; 50 D. D. Lewis OLB; Defensive backs: 31 Benny Barnes CB; 43 Cliff Harris FS; 42 Randy Hughes SS; 25 Aaron Kyle CB; 22 Wade Manning CB; 34 Aaron Mitchell CB; 32 Dennis Thurman SS; Special teams: 1 Rafael Septién K	Reserve lists: 75 Rich Grimmett T (IR); 56 Thomas Henderson LB (Ret.); 72 Ed Jones DE (Ret.); 41 Charlie Waters FS (IR); Rookies in italics 45 active, 4 inactive

== Preseason ==
=== Schedule ===
Week	Date	Opponent	Time	TV	Result	Record	Game site	Attendance	NFL.com recap
1	July 28	vs. Oakland Raiders (at Canton, Ohio)	2:30 p.m. CDT		L 13–20	0–1	Fawcett Stadium		
2	August 4	Denver Broncos	8:00 p.m. CDT		W 7–6	1–1	Texas Stadium		
3	August 12	at Seattle Seahawks	8:00 p.m. CDT		L 17–27	1–2	Kingdome		
4	August 18	Houston Oilers	8:00 p.m. CDT		W 16–13	2–2	Texas Stadium		
5	August 25	Pittsburgh Steelers	8:00 p.m. CDT		W 16–14	3–2	Texas Stadium		

== Regular season ==
=== Schedule ===
Week	Date	Opponent	Time	TV	Result	Record	Game Site	Attendance	Recap
1	September 2	at **St. Louis Cardinals**	1:00 p.m. CDT	CBS	**W** 22–21	1–0	Busch Memorial Stadium	50,855	Recap
2	September 9	at San Francisco 49ers	3:00 p.m. CDT	CBS	**W** 21–13	2–0	Candlestick Park	56,728	Recap
3	September 16	Chicago Bears	3:00 p.m. CDT	CBS	**W** 24–20	3–0	Texas Stadium	64,056	Recap
4	September 24	at Cleveland Browns	8:00 p.m. CDT	ABC	**L** 7–26	3–1	Cleveland Stadium	80,123	Recap
5	September 30	Cincinnati Bengals	3:00 p.m. CDT	NBC	**W** 38–13	4–1	Texas Stadium	63,179	Recap
6	October 7	at Minnesota Vikings	3:00 p.m. CDT	CBS	**W** 36–20	5–1	Metropolitan Stadium	47,572	Recap
7	October 14	Los Angeles Rams	8:00 p.m. CDT	ABC	**W** 30–6	6–1	Texas Stadium	64,462	Recap
8	October 21	**St. Louis Cardinals**	1:00 p.m. CDT	CBS	**W** 22–13	7–1	Texas Stadium	64,300	Recap
9	October 28	at Pittsburgh Steelers	12 Noon CST	CBS	**L** 3–14	7–2	Three Rivers Stadium	50,199	Recap
10	November 4	at **New York Giants**	12 Noon CST	CBS	**W** 16–14	8–2	Giants Stadium	76,490	Recap
11	November 12	**Philadelphia Eagles**	8:00 p.m. CST	ABC	**L** 21–31	8–3	Texas Stadium	62,417	Recap
12	November 18	at **Washington Redskins**	12 Noon CST	CBS	**L** 20–34	8–4	RFK Stadium	55,031	Recap
13	November 22	Houston Oilers	3:00 p.m. CST	NBC	**L** 24–30	8–5	Texas Stadium	63,897	Recap
14	December 2	**New York Giants**	3:00 p.m. CST	CBS	**W** 28–7	9–5	Texas Stadium	63,787	Recap
15	December 8	at **Philadelphia Eagles**	11:30 a.m. CST	CBS	**W** 24–17	10–5	Veterans Stadium	71,434	Recap
16	December 16	**Washington Redskins**	3:00 p.m. CST	CBS	**W** 35–34	11–5	Texas Stadium	62,867	Recap

Division opponents are in bold text

== Season summary ==
=== Week 1 ===
Dallas Cowboys 22 at St. Louis Cardinals 21

Quarter	1	2	3	4	Total
Cowboys (1-0)	3	7	3	9	22
Cardinals (0-1)	0	7	7	7	21

at Civic Center Busch Memorial Stadium

- Date: Sunday, September 2, 1979
- Game time: 2:00pm(ET)
- Game weather: 76 °F (24 °C), relative humidity 73%, wind 7 mph (11 km/h)
- Game attendance: 50,855
- Referee: Fred Wyant
- TV announcers (CBS): Gary Bender and Tom Brookshier
- Pro-Football-Reference.com

Game information

Vegas Odds

- Vegas Line – Dallas Cowboys -4.0
- Over/Under – 37.0(over)

=== Week 2 ===
Dallas Cowboys 21 at San Francisco 49ers 13

Quarter	1	2	3	4	Total
Cowboys (2-0)	3	3	7	8	21
49ers (0-2)	3	7	0	3	13

at Candlestick Park

- Date: Sunday, September 9, 1979
- Game time: 4:00pm(ET)
- Game weather: 65 °F (18 °C), relative humidity 65%, wind 15 mph (24 km/h)
- Referee: Jerry Seeman
- TV announcers (CBS): Vin Scully and George Allen
- Pro-Football-Reference.com

Game information

Vegas Spread

- Vegas Line= Dal -13.0
- Over/Under= 39.0(under)

=== Week 3 ===
Chicago Bears 20 at Dallas Cowboys 24

Quarter	1	2	3	4	Total
Bears (2-1)	7	0	6	7	20
Cowboys (3-0)	7	3	7	7	24

at Texas Stadium

- Date: Sunday, September 16, 1979
- Game time: 4:00pm(ET)
- Game weather: 68 °F (20 °C), relative humidity 41%, wind 8 mph (13 km/h)
- Referee: Pat Haggerty
- TV announcers (CBS): Pat Summerall and Tom Brookshier
- Pro-Football-Reference.com

Game information

Vegas Spread

- Vegas Line= Dal -9.0
- Over/Under= 37.0(over)

=== Week 4 ===
Dallas Cowboys 7 at Cleveland Browns 26

Quarter	1	2	3	4	Total
Cowboys (3-1)	7	0	0	0	7
Browns (4-0)	20	0	0	6	26

at Cleveland Municipal Stadium

- Date: Monday, September 24, 1979
- Game time: 9:00pm(ET)
- Game weather: 56 °F (13 °C), relative humidity 68%, wind 8 mph (13 km/h)
- Game attendance: 80,123
- Referee: Cal Lepore
- TV announcers (ABC): Howard Cosell, Frank Gifford, Don Meredith
- Pro-Football-Reference.com

Game information

Vegas Spread

- Vegas Line= Dal -3.0
- Over/Under= 40.0(under)

=== Week 5 ===
Cincinnati Bengals 13 at Dallas Cowboys 38

Quarter	1	2	3	4	Total
Bengals (0-5)	3	3	7	0	13
Cowboys (4-1)	7	14	10	7	38

at Texas Stadium

- Date: Sunday, September 30, 1979
- Game time: 4:00pm(ET)
- Game weather: 79 °F (26 °C), relative humidity 54%, wind 5 mph (8.0 km/h)
- Game attendance: 63,179
- Referee: Fred Silva
- TV announcers (NBC): Sam Nover and Bob Trumpy
- Pro-Football-Reference.com

Game information

Vegas Spread

- Vegas Line= Dal -10.0
- Over/Under= 40.0(over)

=== Week 6 ===
Dallas Cowboys 36 at Minnesota Vikings 20

Quarter	1	2	3	4	Total
Cowboys (5-1)	3	20	7	6	36
Vikings (3-3)	7	3	10	0	20

at Metropolitan Stadium

- Date: Sunday, October 7, 1979
- Game time: 4:00pm(ET)
- Game weather: 43 °F (6 °C), relative humidity 65%, wind 5 mph (8.0 km/h)
- Referee: Chuck Heberling
- TV announcers (CBS): Pat Summerall and Tom Brookshier
- Pro-Football-Reference.com

Game information

Vegas Spread

- Vegas Line= Dal -7.0
- Over/Under= 39.0(over)

=== Week 7 ===
Los Angeles Rams 6 at Dallas Cowboys 30

Quarter	1	2	3	4	Total
Los Angeles Rams (4-3)	0	6	0	0	6
Cowboys (6-1)	6	7	17	0	30

at Texas Stadium

- Date: Sunday, October 14, 1979
- Game time: 9:00pm(ET)
- Game weather: 67 °F (19 °C), relative humidity 41%, wind 10 mph (16 km/h)
- Game attendance: 64,462
- Referee: Fred Wyant
- TV announcers (ABC): Frank Gifford, Don Meredith, and Fran Tarkenton
- Pro-Football-Reference.com

Game information

Vegas Spread

- Vegas Line= Dal -3.0
- Over/Under= 39.0(under)

=== Week 8 ===
St. Louis Cardinals 13 at Dallas Cowboys 22

Quarter	1	2	3	4	Total
Cardinals (2-6)	6	7	0	0	13
Cowboys (7-1)	3	14	2	3	22

at Texas Stadium

- Date: Sunday, October 21, 1979
- Game time: 2:00pm(ET)
- Game weather: 81 °F (27 °C), relative humidity 63%, wind 24 mph (39 km/h)
- TV announcers (CBS): Pat Summerall and Tom Brookshier
- Pro-Football-Reference.com

Game information

Vegas Spread

- Vegas Line= Dal -10.0
- Over/Under= 39.0(under)

=== Week 9 (Sunday, October 28, 1979): at Pittsburgh Steelers ===
Week 9: Dallas Cowboys at Pittsburgh Steelers – Game summary

Quarter	1	2	3	4	Total
Cowboys (7–2)	0	3	0	0	3
Steelers (7–2)	0	7	7	0	14

at Three Rivers Stadium • Pittsburgh, Pennsylvania

- Date: Sunday, October 28, 1979
- Game time: 12:00 Noon CST
- Game weather: 51 °F (11 °C), relative humidity 60%, wind 12 mph (19 km/h)
- Game attendance: 50,199
- Referee: Dick Jorgensen
- TV announcers (CBS): Pat Summerall (play–by–play) and Tom Brookshier (color commentator)

Team	Category	Player	Statistics
DAL	Passing		
DAL	Rushing		
DAL	Receiving		
PIT	Passing		
PIT	Rushing		
PIT	Receiving		

Scoring summary

Quarter	Time	Drive			Team	Scoring information	Score	
Quarter	Time	Plays	Yards	TOP	Team	Scoring information	DAL	PIT
2					Steelers	Harris 1-yard touchdown run, Bahr kick good	0	7
2					Cowboys	32-yard field goal by Septién	3	7
3					Steelers	Harris 48-yard touchdown run, Bahr kick good	3	14
"TOP" = time of possession. For other American football terms, see Glossary of American football.							3	14

- Point spread: Cowboys +3
- Over/under: 39.0 (under)
- Time of game:

Cowboys	Game statistics	Steelers
	First downs	
	Rushes–yards	
	Passing yards	
	Passes	
	Sacked–yards	
	Net passing yards	
	Total yards	
	Return yards	
	Punts	
	Fumbles–lost	
	Penalties–yards	
	Time of possession	

=== Week 10 ===
Dallas Cowboys 16 at New York Giants 14

Quarter	1	2	3	4	Total
Cowboys (8-2)	3	0	3	10	16
Giants (4-6)	0	7	0	7	14

at Giants Stadium

- Date: Sunday, November 4, 1979
- Game time: 1:00pm(ET)
- Game weather: 47 °F (8 °C), relative humidity 61%, wind 13 mph (21 km/h)
- Game attendance: 76,490
- Referee: Jerry Markbreit
- TV announcers (CBS): Pat Summerall and Tom Brookshier
- Pro-Football-Reference.com

Game information

Vegas Spread

- Vegas Line= Dallas Cowboys -8.0
- Over/Under= 38.0 (under)

=== Week 11 ===
Philadelphia Eagles 31 at Dallas Cowboys 21

Quarter	1	2	3	4	Total
Eagles (7-4)	7	10	7	7	31
Cowboys (8-3)	7	0	0	14	21

at Texas Stadium

- Date: Monday, November 12, 1979
- Game time: 9:00pm(ET)
- Game weather: 45 °F (7 °C), relative humidity 65%, wind 5 mph (8.0 km/h)
- Game attendance: 62,417
- Referee: Gene Barth
- TV announcers (ABC): Howard Cosell, Frank Gifford, Don Meredith
- Pro-Football-Reference.com

Game information

Vegas Spread

- Vegas Line= Dal -10.0
- Over/Under= 38.0(over)

=== Week 12 ===
Dallas Cowboys 20 at Washington Redskins 34

Quarter	1	2	3	4	Total
Cowboys (8-4)	0	3	3	14	20
Redskins (8-4)	7	7	10	10	34

at Robert F. Kennedy Memorial Stadium

- Date: Sunday, November 18, 1979
- Game time: 1:00pm(ET)
- Game weather: 56 °F (13 °C), relative humidity 59%, wind 7 mph (11 km/h)
- Game attendance: 55,031
- Referee: Cal Lepore
- TV announcers (CBS): Pat Summerall and Tom Brookshier
- Pro-Football-Reference.com

Game information

Vegas Spread

- Vegas Line= Dal -4.0
- Over/Under= 37.0(over)

=== Week 13 ===
Houston Oilers 30 at Dallas Cowboys 24

Quarter	1	2	3	4	Total
Oilers (10-3)	7	10	6	7	30
Cowboys (8-5)	14	7	0	3	24

at Texas Stadium

- Date: Thursday, November 22, 1979
- Game time: 4:00pm(ET)
- Game weather: 46 °F (8 °C), relative humidity 44%, wind 16 mph (26 km/h)
- Game attendance: 63,897
- Referee: Gordon McCarter
- TV announcers (NBC): Dick Enberg and Merlin Olsen
- Pro-Football-Reference.com

Game information

Vegas Spread

- Vegas Line= Dal -1.0
- Over/Under= 41.0(over)

=== Week 14 ===
New York Giants 7 at Dallas Cowboys 28

Quarter	1	2	3	4	Total
Giants (6-8)	7	0	0	0	7
Cowboys (9-5)	0	7	14	7	28

at Texas Stadium

- Date: Sunday, December 2, 1979
- Game time: 4:00pm(ET)
- Game weather: 41 °F (5 °C), relative humidity 39%, wind 7 mph (11 km/h)
- Game attendance: 63,787
- Referee: Jerry Markbreit
- TV announcers (CBS): Pat Summerall and Tom Brookshier
- Pro-Football-Reference.com

Game information

Vegas Spread

- Vegas Line= Dal -11.0
- Over/Under= 38.0(under)

=== Week 15 ===
Dallas Cowboys 24 at Philadelphia Eagles 17

Quarter	1	2	3	4	Total
Cowboys (10-5)	10	0	7	7	24
Eagles (10-5)	3	7	0	7	17

at Veterans Stadium

- Date: Saturday, December 8, 1979
- Game time: 12:30pm(ET)
- Game weather: 44 °F (7 °C), relative humidity 56%, wind 21 mph (34 km/h)
- Game attendance: 71,434
- Referee: Jim Tunney
- TV announcers (CBS): Pat Summerall and Tom Brookshier
- Pro-Football-Reference.com

Game information

Vegas Spread

- Vegas Line= Dal -3.0
- Over/Under= 40.0(over)

=== Week 16 (Sunday, December 16, 1979): vs. Washington Redskins ===
Week 16: Washington Redskins at Dallas Cowboys – Game summary

Quarter	1	2	3	4	Total
Redskins (10–6)	10	7	0	17	34
Cowboys (11–5)	0	14	7	14	35

at Texas Stadium • Irving, Texas

- Date: Sunday, December 16, 1979
- Game time: 3:00 p.m. CST
- Game weather: 40 °F (4 °C)
- Game attendance: 62,867
- Referee: Bob Frederic
- TV announcers (CBS): Pat Summerall (play-by-play) and Tom Brookshier (color commentator)
- Washington Redskins at Dallas Cowboys – December 16, 1979

Team	Category	Player	Statistics
WAS	Passing	Joe Theismann	12/23, 200 YDS, 1 TD
WAS	Rushing	John Riggins	22 CAR, 151 YDS, 2 TD
WAS	Receiving	Benny Malone	1 REC, 55 YDS, 1 TD
DAL	Passing	Roger Staubach	24/42, 326 YDS, 3 TD, 1 INT
DAL	Rushing	Ron Springs	20 CAR, 79 YDS, 1 TD
DAL	Receiving	Tony Hill	8 REC, 113 YDS, 1 TD

Scoring summary

Quarter	Time	Drive			Team	Scoring information	Score	
Quarter	Time	Plays	Yards	TOP	Team	Scoring information	WAS	DAL
1					Redskins	24-yard field goal by Moseley	3	0
1					Redskins	Theismann 1-yard touchdown run, Moseley kick good	10	0
2					Redskins	Malone 55-yard touchdown reception from Thiesmann, Moseley kick good	17	0
2					Cowboys	Springs 1-yard touchdown run, Septién kick good	17	7
2					Cowboys	Pearson 26-yard touchdown reception from Staubach, Septién kick good	17	14
3					Cowboys	Newhouse 2-yard touchdown run, Septién kick good	17	21
4					Redskins	24-yard field goal by Moseley	20	21
4					Redskins	Riggins 1-yard touchdown run, Moseley kick good	27	21
4	6:54				Redskins	Riggins 66-yard touchdown run, Moseley kick good	34	21
4					Cowboys	Springs 26-yard touchdown reception from Staubach, Septién kick good	34	28
4	0:39				Cowboys	Hill 8-yard touchdown reception from Staubach, Septién kick good	34	35
"TOP" = time of possession. For other American football terms, see Glossary of American football.							34	35

It was December 16, 1979, when the Washington Redskins came to Texas Stadium tied with the Cowboys for first place in the NFC East with 10–5 records. This game would turn out to be one of Roger Staubach's finest moments as well as his last great comeback in his Cowboys career.

The NFC East showdown between these heated rivals did not start out the way the Cowboys had wanted. On the Cowboys' first two possessions of the game they fumbled and the Redskins took full advantage of the recoveries.

It took only two plays on the Cowboys' first possession before rookie Ron Springs fumbled at the Cowboys' 34-yard line. The Redskins took over and drove to the Cowboys' three-yard line. On third and goal Larry Cole sacked Redskins quarterback Joe Theismann and forced the Redskins to kick a field goal by Mark Mosley for an early 3–0 lead.

On the Cowboys' second possession they once again fumbled the ball away. This time it was Robert Newhouse who gave the ball to the Redskins on the Cowboys' 45-yard line. The Redskins drove to the Cowboys' one-yard line, but this time Theismann made sure there would be no field goal attempt as he scored himself, giving the Redskins a 10–0 lead.

With the Redskins leading 10–0 going into the second quarter and the Cowboys' offense showing no signs of life, the Redskins' offense went back to work with an 80-yard, 7-play drive. They finished the drive when Theismann connected with running back Benny Malone who eluded a tackle by D.D. Lewis. Malone raced down the right sideline for a 55-yard touchdown, giving the Redskins a commanding 17–0 lead.

The Cowboys' offense seemed to wake up on their next possession. They put together a 13-play, 70-yard drive. From the Redskins' one-yard line, Ron Springs made up for his earlier fumble as he scored the Cowboys' first touchdown of the game. The Redskins now led 17–7 with a little more than four minutes left in the first half.

With only 1:48 left in the first half, the Cowboys got the ball back on their own 15-yard line. Staubach went to work as he connected with Tony Hill three times and Drew Pearson once to get to the Redskins' 26-yard line. With only nine seconds remaining, Staubach connected with Preston Pearson for a touchdown as Pearson made a diving catch in the end zone. The Cowboys had fought their way back into the game with two second-quarter touchdowns. They went into the half down 17–14.

In the third quarter the Cowboys' defense shut down the Redskins' offense. The Cowboys' offense took advantage and scored the only touchdown of the quarter, which gave them their first lead of the game. After a short Redskins punt the Cowboys took over at their own 48-yard line. They needed only nine plays, which included a Butch Johnson reverse that gained 13 yards. Preston Pearson took a short pass from Staubach and got the Cowboys to the two-yard line. Like Ron Springs in the first half, it was now Newhouse's turn to make up for his earlier fumble. He scored from the two-yard line, giving the Cowboys a 21–17 lead.

Early in the fourth quarter the Redskins drove to the Cowboys' 7-yard line where they had to settle for a Mark Mosley 24-yard field goal. That made the score 21–20 Cowboys.

Staubach threw his only interception of the game when he went deep over the middle from his own 13-yard line where there was no receiver in sight. Redskins safety Mark Murphy came down with the ball and returned it to the Cowboys' 25-yard line. On the Redskins' first play, Theismann threw into the end zone for receiver Ricky Thompson. Cowboys safety Cliff Harris bumped Thompson and was called for pass interference. The penalty placed the ball at the Cowboys' one-yard line where John Riggins scored to give the lead back to the Redskins, 27–21.

With less than seven minutes to play in the game, Riggins seemed to put the game out of reach for the Cowboys. Riggins broke to the outside at his own 34-yard line as he outran Cowboys linebacker Mike Hegman and then broke a tackle by Cliff Harris. Riggins then raced away from Cowboys cornerback Dennis Thurman down the right sideline and scored from 66 yards for a 34–21 Redskins lead.

With 3:49 left in the game, Randy White recovered a Redskins fumble. Roger Staubach only needed three plays to get the Cowboys closer as he connected with Ron Springs for a 26-yard touchdown. Springs caught the pass at the five-yard line and dragged Redskins cornerback Ray Waddy into the end zone. The Redskins still had a 34–28 lead with 2:20 left in the game.

With time running out and the Redskins facing a third and one, veteran defensive tackle Larry Cole threw Riggins for a two-yard loss and forced the Redskins to punt.

The Cowboys stood 75 yards away from an NFC Eastern Division title. Roger Staubach went back to work like he had done so many times in his career. He drove the Cowboys down the field in only seven plays. During the drive he connected with Tony Hill for 20 yards, then to Preston Pearson for 22 yards. With 1:01 left in the game Staubach went back to Preston Pearson for a 25-yard gain to the Redskins' 8-yard line. From there Staubach lofted a pass into the end zone that Tony Hill came down with.

The Cowboys won the game 35–34 over the Redskins and also won their 11th Eastern title in the team's 20-year history. The win also gave the Cowboys a week off and home field advantage in the playoffs. With the win it also knocked the Redskins out of the playoffs.

Roger Staubach finished the game with 336 yards passing and three touchdown passes. It was also the 21st time he guided the Cowboys to a fourth-quarter win and the 14th time he turned defeat into victory for the Cowboys in the final two minutes of a game.

Tony Hill led all receivers with eight receptions for 113 yards and the game-winning touchdown. Preston Pearson followed Hill with five receptions for 108 yards and one touchdown. Rookie Ron Springs, who started in place of the injured Tony Dorsett, rushed for 79 yards and a touchdown. He also added 58 receiving yards with one touchdown.

"What can I say about him?" asked Tom Landry. "Roger is simply super in these kinds of situations. He's done it before and knows he can do it."

Harvey Martin, still in full uniform, threw a wreath that had been sent to the Cowboys' facility before the game (later discovered sent by a Dallas fan but from a florist address in Rockville, Maryland) into the Redskins' locker room right after the comeback victory.

== Playoffs ==
Round	Date	Opponent	Result	Game Site	Attendance	Recap
Wild Card	First Round Bye					
Divisional	December 30, 1979	Los Angeles Rams (3)	L 19–21	Texas Stadium	64,792	Recap

Los Angeles Rams 21 at Dallas Cowboys 19

Team	1	2	3	4	Total
• Los Angeles Rams (10–7)	0	14	0	7	21
Cowboys (11–6)	2	3	7	7	19

- Date: Sunday, December 30, 1979
- Location: Texas Stadium
- Game start: 4:00pm(ET)
- Game weather: 43 °F (6 °C), wind 12 mph (19 km/h)
- Referee: Jerry Markbreit
- Television network: CBS
- Source: Pro-Football-Reference.com

Scoring summary
1	Dal	Safety, Randy White tackled Ferragamo in end zone	Cowboys 2–0
2	LA	Wendell Tyler 32-yard pass from Vince Ferragamo (Frank Corral kick)	Rams 7–2
2	Dal	Rafael Septién 33-yard field goal	Rams 7–5
2	LA	Ron Smith 43-yard pass from Vince Ferragamo (Frank Corral kick)	Rams 14–5
3	Dal	Ron Springs 1-yard rush (Rafael Septién kick)	Rams 14–12
4	Dal	Jay Saldi 2-yard pass from Roger Staubach (Rafael Septién kick)	Cowboys 19–14
4	LA	Billy Waddy 50-yard pass from Vince Ferragamo (Frank Corral kick)	Rams 21–19

Vegas Spread

- Vegas Line= Dal -8.5

The loss to the Rams in 1979 was one of the worst playoff defeats in Cowboys history. Some say the loss had to do with the dramatic game against the Redskins two weeks earlier that put the Cowboys in the playoffs. Others believe that the Cowboys just overlooked the Rams. Whatever the reasons were, the Cowboys' season ended that Sunday in Texas Stadium. The Staubach magic also ended that day: on March 31, 1980, he announced his retirement from the Cowboys and the NFL after 11 seasons and two Super Bowl Championships.

== Standings ==
NFC East
	W	L	T	PCT	DIV	CONF	PF	PA	STK
Dallas Cowboys^{(1)}	11	5	0	.688	6–2	10–2	371	313	W3
Philadelphia Eagles^{(4)}	11	5	0	.688	6–2	9–3	339	282	W1
Washington Redskins	10	6	0	.625	5–3	8–4	348	295	L1
New York Giants	6	10	0	.375	1–7	5–9	237	323	L3
St. Louis Cardinals	5	11	0	.313	2–6	4–8	307	358	L1

== Statistics ==
=== Passing ===
Player	Comp	Att	Yards	TD	INT
Roger Staubach	267	461	3,586	27	11

=== Rushing ===
Player	Att	Yards	TD
Tony Dorsett	250	1,107	6
Drew Pearson	3	27	
Tony Hill	2	18	

=== Receiving ===
Player	Rec	Yards	TD
Tony Hill	60	1,062	10
Drew Pearson	55	1,026	8
Tony Dorsett	45	375	1
Billy Joe Dupree	29	324	5
