= Glen Titensor =

American football player (born 1958)

No. 63
- Positions: Guard, center

Personal information
- Born: February 21, 1958 (age 68); Bellflower, California, U.S.
- Listed height: 6 ft 4 in (1.93 m)
- Listed weight: 263 lb (119 kg)

Career information
- High school: Bolsa Grande (CA)
- College: Brigham Young
- NFL draft: 1981: 3rd round, 81st overall pick

Career history
- Dallas Cowboys (1981–1988)

Awards and highlights
- 2× All-WAC (1979, 1980)

Career NFL statistics
- Games played: 92
- Games started: 46
- Fumble recoveries: 2
- Stats at Pro Football Reference

Glen Weston Titensor (born February 21, 1958) is an American former professional football player who was an offensive lineman in the National Football League (NFL) for the Dallas Cowboys. He played college football at Brigham Young University.

== Early life ==
Titensor attended Bolsa Grande High School and was a three-year starter at tackle on both offense and defense for the football, receiving All-County honors as a junior. He was injured in the first game of his senior year and missed the entire season. He also practiced track & field.

He received a football scholarship from UCLA, where he played at nose guard and defensive tackle backing up All-American Manu Tuiasosopo for two years. He transferred at the end of his sophomore season to Brigham Young University and sat out the 1978 season.

He was named the starter at left defensive tackle as a junior, before moving to defensive end, where he received All-WAC and honorable-mention All-American honors.

As a senior, he registered 41 tackles (5 for loss), 13 sacks (led the team) and 38 quarterback hurries. He finished his college career with 88 tackles (12 for loss), 17 sacks, 57 quarterback hurries and 3 forced fumbles.

== Professional career ==
Titensor was selected by the Dallas Cowboys in the third round (81st overall) of the 1981 NFL draft as a defensive end. The Cowboys offense needed help and like Blaine Nye, John Fitzgerald, Pat Donovan and Kurt Petersen before him, he was switched to the offensive line to play tackle as a rookie. During the season he was also tried at center and guard during practice, but on game days he played mainly on special teams. He played briefly at left guard in the playoffs against the Tampa Bay Buccaneers in place of Herbert Scott who suffered a minor injury.

In 1982, he missed 5 of 9 games when he suffered a left knee injury in the fourth game of the season, but returned a month later and was available for the playoffs.

In 1983, he played center during the second half of the game against the Minnesota Vikings and started against the Tampa Bay Buccaneers in place of an injured Tom Rafferty.

A reserve guard/center during his first three seasons, Titensor took over the left guard position four games into the 1984 season, after Scott went down with an injury in the preseason and couldn't regain his playing level. He started every game in 1985 and 1986.

In 1987, he suffered a knee injury in training camp and was placed on the injured reserve list. He was replaced on the starting lineup with Nate Newton. He was waived on August 28, 1988, but was re-signed because of injuries on September 24. He appeared in 10 games (one start). He was released on June 1, 1989.

== Personal life ==
Titensor is currently the owner of Timbercreek Golf Center in Lewisville, Texas.
