= Howard Richards (American football) =

American football player (born 1959)

No. 70
- Positions: Tackle, guard

Personal information
- Born: August 7, 1959 (age 67); St. Louis, Missouri, U.S.
- Listed height: 6 ft 5 in (1.96 m)
- Listed weight: 268 lb (122 kg)

Career information
- High school: Southwest (St. Louis}
- College: Missouri
- NFL draft: 1981: 1st round, 26th overall pick

Career history
- Dallas Cowboys (1981–1986); New York Jets (1987)*; Seattle Seahawks (1987)
- * Offseason or practice squad member only

Awards and highlights
- Second-team All-American (1980); First-team All-Big Eight (1980); Second-team All-Big Eight (1979)

Career NFL statistics
- Games played: 69
- Games started: 18
- Fumble recoveries: 3
- Stats at Pro Football Reference

Howard Glenn Richards, Jr. (born August 7, 1959) is an American former professional football player who was an offensive tackle in the National Football League (NFL) for the Dallas Cowboys and Seattle Seahawks. He played college football for the Missouri Tigers.

== Early life ==
Richards was born on August 7, 1959, in St. Louis, Missouri. In 1969, Richards had to be bussed (because of desegregation) to be a part of the St. Louis Public School's gifted program at Wade Elementary School, which he previously began at Walnut Park Elementary School.

He attended Southwest High School, where as a freshman he practiced baseball, basketball and football. Richards limited his playing time on football and basketball in his sophomore and junior seasons. As a senior, he just focused on football.

== College career ==
Richards accepted a football scholarship from the University of Missouri. He started 4 games as a true freshman, which was the beginning of a 40 consecutive games starts streak at right tackle, under head coaches Al Onofrio (1977) and Warren Powers (1978-80).

He became a standout offensive tackle and was named to the All-Big Eight team as a junior and senior. In his last year in 1980, he was named offensive co-captain and received second-team All-American honors. He played in the Senior Bowl and the Hula Bowl.

== Professional career ==
=== Dallas Cowboys ===
In the 1981 NFL draft, the Dallas Cowboys were targeting cornerback Bobby Butler with their first round selection, but settled on Richards (26th overall) after Butler was taken by the Atlanta Falcons. This was only the third time in franchise history that the Cowboys used a first round pick on an offensive lineman, with John Niland and Robert Shaw being chosen before.

In Richards' second season, he was the starter at left guard, but split time the next year with All-Pro Herb Scott.

In 1984, Richards had a chance to replace the retiring Pat Donovan at left tackle, but was replaced by Phil Pozderac after suffering a torn groin muscle. He eventually started four games at left tackle, before missing the last four games of the season due to a torn quadriceps injury, that required season-ending surgery. He was the recipient of the Ed Block Courage Award at the end of the season.

Richards had three solid years, before injuries caused him to miss time over the next two seasons. He began 1985 on the physically unable to perform list and was not activated until October 24. Richards was named the starter at right guard for the 1986 season, but injuries stalled his progress again and he only appeared in nine games (two starts).

Richards was waived on June 18, 1987, along with many other well-known Cowboys veterans, after the franchise's first losing season in 22 years. Although he was a part of two NFC East division championships and two consecutive NFC Championship Game appearances, Richards' career was marred by injuries and struggles to regain his top form.

=== Seattle Seahawks ===
In 1987, after the players went on a strike on the third week of the season, those games were canceled (reducing the 16 game season to 15) and the NFL decided that the games would be played with replacement players. Richards was signed on October 7 to be a part of the Seattle Seahawks replacement team.

He played in two games, before suffering a knee injury against the Detroit Lions and being placed on the injured reserve list on October 20. He retired at the end of the season.

== Personal life ==
Richards served for 13 years at the Central Intelligence Agency. He currently works as the football color analyst for the University of Missouri on Learfield Sports' Tiger Radio Network. Additionally, he is the Senior Manager of External Relations for the College of Arts and Science at Missouri.

He is the first cousin of Erik McMillan, formerly of the New York Jets and nephew of Ernie McMillan, formerly of the Saint Louis Cardinals.

In 2012, Richards was honored by the University of Missouri's College of Arts & Science as a distinguished alumni. In October 2015, he was again honored by receiving the University of Missouri's prestigious Faculty - Alumni Award which recognizes the achievements of faculty and alumni.

In 2015, Richards was inducted into the St. Louis Sports Hall of Fame.
