= Andy Frederick =

American football player (born 1954)

No. 70, 71
- Position: Offensive tackle

Personal information
- Born: July 25, 1954 (age 72); Oak Park, Illinois, U.S.
- Listed height: 6 ft 6 in (1.98 m)
- Listed weight: 257 lb (117 kg)

Career information
- High school: St. Joseph (Westchester, Illinois)
- College: New Mexico
- NFL draft: 1977: 5th round, 137th overall pick

Career history
- Dallas Cowboys (1977–1981); Cleveland Browns (1982); Chicago Bears (1983–1986)

Awards and highlights
- 2× Super Bowl champion (XII, XX)

Career NFL statistics
- Games played: 132
- Games started: 15
- Fumble recoveries: 1
- Stats at Pro Football Reference

Andrew Brian Frederick (born July 25, 1954) is an American former professional football player who was an offensive tackle in the National Football League (NFL) for the Dallas Cowboys, Cleveland Browns, and Chicago Bears. He played college football for the New Mexico Lobos.

== Early life ==
Frederick attended St. Joseph High School where he played as tight end. He also practiced basketball. He accepted a football scholarship from the University of New Mexico, where he was converted into a defensive tackle.

In 2010, he was inducted into the University of New Mexico Athletics Hall of Honor.

== Professional career ==
=== Dallas Cowboys ===
Frederick was selected by the Dallas Cowboys in the fifth round (137th overall) of the 1977 NFL draft, to convert him into an offensive lineman. As a rookie, he played on special teams and backed up Ralph Neely at left tackle, who was bothered by an injured knee. He was a part of the Super Bowl XII winning team.

In 1978, he was named the starter at right tackle to replace Pat Donovan who moved to the left side to take the place of the retired Neely. He was relegated into a reserve role after the fifth game, when Rayfield Wright finished his knee rehabilitation.

In 1979, he was one of the last cuts in preseason, but was brought back after rookie tackle Richard Grimmett suffered a knee injury one week before the season opener. He contributed on special teams and as a backup.

In 1980, he was the team's only backup tackle. He started in the eleventh game against the St. Louis Cardinals, in place of an injured Jim Cooper. In 1981, he remained as a backup tackle. On September 3, 1982, he was waived after being passed on the depth chart by rookie Phil Pozderac.

=== Cleveland Browns ===
On September 9, 1982, he was signed by the Cleveland Browns as a free agent. On April 28, 1983, he was traded the Chicago Bears in exchange for past considerations.

=== Chicago Bears ===
In 1983, he started 6 games at right tackle for the Chicago Bears. During the Bears' Super Bowl run in 1985, he was mostly used as an extra tight end in goal line situations. He started one game in 1985, a Week 4 contest against Washington, filing in for an injured Jimbo Covert.

In 1986, he was placed on the injured reserve list with a toe injury. In 1987, he failed the physical exam and did not make the team.
