= Drew Pearson (American football) =

American football player (born 1951)

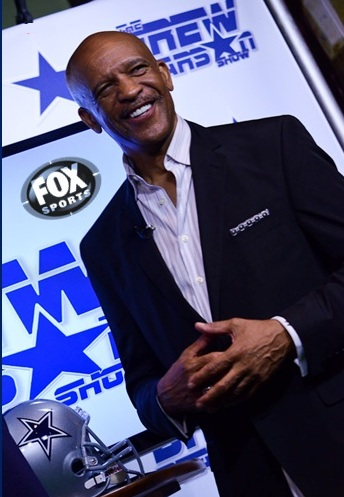
- Pearson in 2012

No. 88
- Position: Wide receiver

Personal information
- Born: January 12, 1951 (age 75); South River, New Jersey, U.S.
- Listed height: 6 ft 0 in (1.83 m)
- Listed weight: 184 lb (83 kg)

Career information
- High school: South River
- College: Tulsa (1969–1972)
- NFL draft: 1973: undrafted

Career history

Playing
- Dallas Cowboys (1973–1983)

Coaching
- Dallas Cowboys (1985) Wide receivers coach; Dallas Texans (1991) Head coach

Operations
- NY/NJ Hitmen (2001) VP & General Manager; Allen Wranglers (2011–2012) General Manager

Awards and highlights
- Super Bowl champion (XII); 3× First-team All-Pro (1974, 1976, 1977); 3× Pro Bowl (1974, 1976, 1977); NFL receiving yards leader (1977); NFL 1970s All-Decade Team; Dallas Cowboys Ring of Honor

Career NFL statistics
- Receptions: 489
- Receiving yards: 7,822
- Receiving touchdowns: 48
- Stats at Pro Football Reference
- Pro Football Hall of Fame

Drew Pearson (born January 12, 1951) is an American former professional football player who was a wide receiver for 11 seasons with the Dallas Cowboys of the National Football League (NFL). He played college football for the Tulsa Golden Hurricane. He was inducted into the Pro Football Hall of Fame in 2021.

== Early life ==
Pearson was born and raised in South River, New Jersey, and began his football career at South River High School as one of the wide receivers of Joe Theismann. As a junior, he succeeded Theismann as the starting quarterback. He also lettered in baseball and basketball, graduating in 1969.

== College career ==
He accepted a football scholarship from the University of Tulsa. As a sophomore in 1970, he was the backup quarterback behind John Dobbs. He started four games, making 36 out of 86 completions (41.9%), for 423 passing yards, one touchdown and 5 interceptions.

As a junior in 1971, he was converted into a wide receiver. He was second on the team with 22 receptions for 429 yards. He led the team with an average of 19.5 yards per reception and 3 receiving touchdowns.

As a senior in 1972, he led a run-oriented offense with 33 receptions for 690 yards (20.9 yards per reception) and 5 touchdowns. He finished his college career with 55 receptions for 1,119 yards, 8 touchdowns and a 20.3-yard average per reception.

In 1985, he was inducted into the Tulsa Athletics Hall of Fame. In 1998, he received the NCAA Silver Anniversary Award.

== Professional career ==
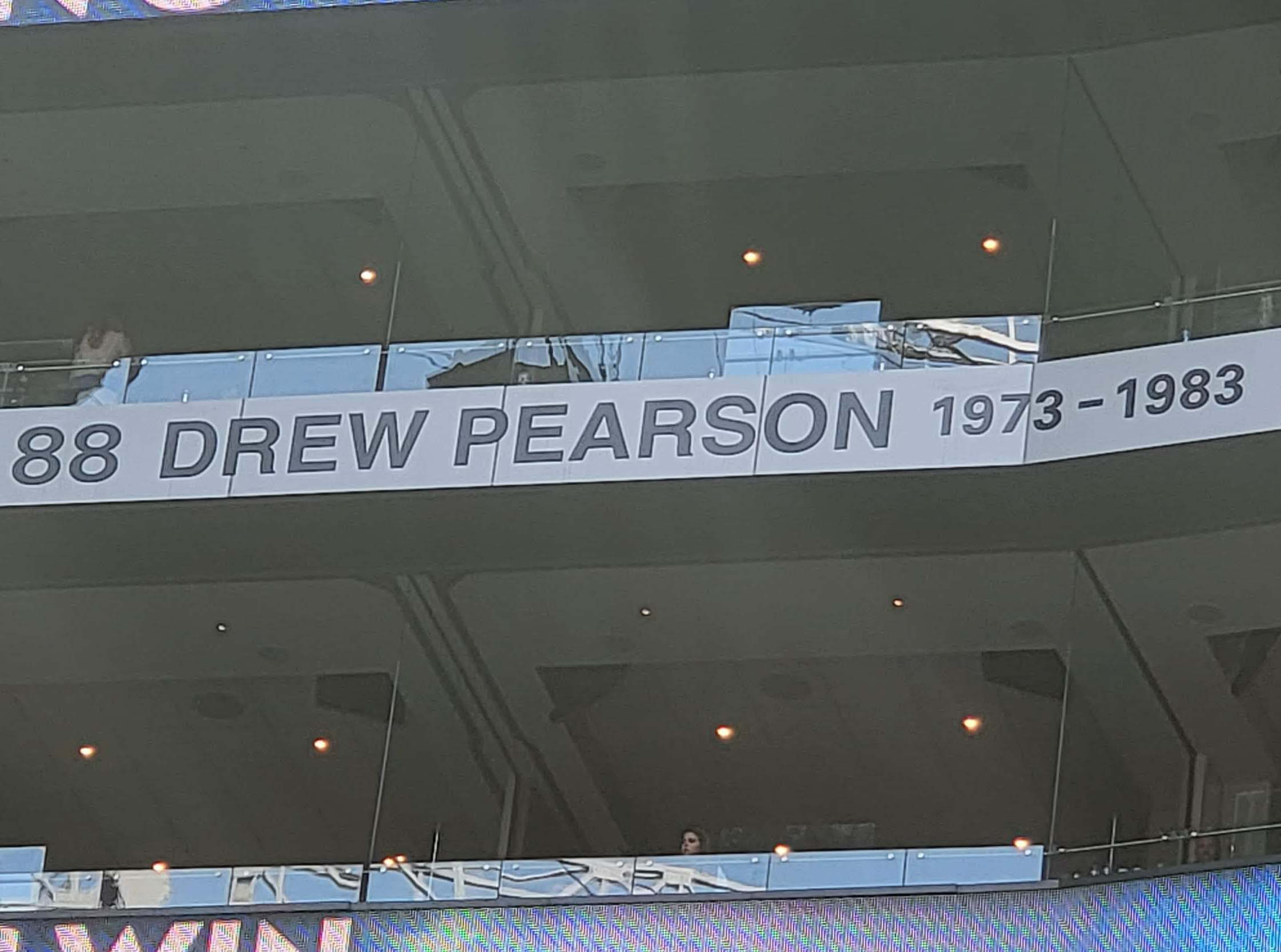
Drew Pearson's name as a member of the Dallas Cowboys Ring of Honor at AT&T Stadium.

In 1973, Pearson was signed as an undrafted free agent by the Dallas Cowboys and made the team as a third-team wide receiver because of his special teams play. As a rookie, he replaced Otto Stowe after Stowe suffered a broken ankle in the seventh game of the season against the Philadelphia Eagles, and his backup Mike Montgomery would also fall to injury in the next game. He appeared in 14 games with six starts, making 22 receptions for 388 yards and two touchdowns.

In 1974, Stowe asked to be traded and Pearson became the full-time starter opposite Golden Richards. He led the team with 62 receptions and 1,087 yards, while also catching 2 touchdowns. He would keep leading the team in receiving until 1978, when Tony Hill took over the number one role at wide receiver.

In 1979, he and Tony Hill—along with Tony Dorsett—helped the Cowboys become the first team in NFL history to have two 1,000-yards wide receivers and a 1,000-yard running back, when he recorded 55 receptions, 1,026 yards and 8 touchdowns. Pearson and Hill also became the first wide receiver tandem in Cowboys history to record 1,000-yard receiving seasons in the same year.

In 1980, he surpassed Bob Hayes' club mark in receptions and was selected by the Cowboys as their nominee for NFL Man of the Year. In the 1981 NFC Championship Game against the San Francisco 49ers, Pearson almost rendered "The Catch" irrelevant when, in the waning moments of the game, he caught a 31-yard pass from Danny White that might’ve gone for a touchdown and won the game for the Cowboys had 49ers cornerback Eric Wright not made a one-handed horse-collar tackle, a legal tackle at the time, stopping him at the San Francisco 44 just outside field-goal range (White fumbled on the next play, thus preserving victory for the 49ers and putting them in Super Bowl XVI).

In 1982, he delivered a key downfield block during Tony Dorsett's NFL record 99-yard touchdown run.

In 1983, he passed Hayes as the franchise leader in receiving yards.

On March 22, 1984, at 1:30 a.m. Drew fell asleep while driving, and crashed his car against a parked tractor-trailer. Drew's brother Carey was killed; Drew himself sustained a career-ending liver injury in the crash.

Pearson helped the Cowboys to three Super Bowl appearances and a victory in Super Bowl XII in 1978. He also scored a touchdown in Super Bowl X. Pearson was known as "Mr. Clutch" for his numerous clutch catches in game-winning situations, especially the Hail Mary reception from Roger Staubach that sealed the victory over the Vikings in a 1975 playoff game, one of the most famous plays in NFL history. He also caught the game-sealing touchdown in a 1973 playoff game against the Los Angeles Rams and the game-winning touchdown pass from reserve quarterback Clint Longley in the 1974 Thanksgiving game against the Washington Redskins. All three plays were named among the Top 75 plays in NFL history by NFL Films in 1994. Pearson figured prominently in a fourth play on that list, throwing the final block to clear Tony Dorsett's path to the end zone on his 99-yard touchdown run in 1983. In addition, in the 1980 playoff game at Atlanta Pearson's clutch receptions helped win that game in a comeback by the Cowboys.

He rose to become one of the NFL's greatest wide receivers, earning career records of 489 receptions and 7,822 receiving yards, along with 189 rushing yards, 155 yards returning kickoffs, and 50 touchdowns (48 receiving and two fumble recoveries). Pearson was named one of the Top 20 Pro Football All-Time wide receivers, he was also recognized for his achievements by being named to the NFL 1970s All-Decade Team. Despite this fact, he was the only player from the team to not be inducted into the Pro Football Hall of Fame at the time, including the only one from the offensive first team category.

Pearson was named All-Pro three times (1974, 1976–77) All-NFC in 1975 and second Team All-NFC in 1978. In addition, Pearson was a Pro Bowler in 1974, 1976 and 1977. He was named The Football Digest NFL receiver of the year in 1977. He led the National Football Conference (NFC) in pass receptions in 1976 with 58. He served as offensive captain for the Cowboys in 1977, 1978, 1982 and 1983.

In 1984, he was named to the Dallas Cowboys' 25th-anniversary team.

In 2009, on the NFL Network show "NFL's Top 10", in the episode titled "Greatest Dallas Cowboys", he is number 10 on the list, although the update in 2016 where Drew was not on the list and was replaced by Randy White as #10 as well.

On August 19, 2011, Cowboys owner Jerry Jones announced that Pearson had been selected for inclusion into the Dallas Cowboys Ring of Honor. Pearson, Charles Haley and Larry Allen were inducted during the half-time show of the Cowboys-Seahawks game on November 6, 2011.

The Professional Football Researchers Association named Pearson to the PFRA Hall of Very Good Class of 2010.

Pearson was named as a senior finalist for the Pro Football Hall of Fame in the Class of 2020 as a part of its "Centennial Slate" of 20 senior finalists. However, he fell just shy of getting inducted. The following year, he was named the lone senior finalist for the class of 2021.

On February 6, 2021, Pearson was named to the 2021 Pro Football Hall of Fame class and his bust was sculpted by Scott Myers.

== NFL career statistics ==
Legend
	Won the Super Bowl
	Led the league
**Bold**	Career high

=== Regular season ===
Year	Team	Games		Receiving				
Year	Team	GP	GS	Rec	Yds	Avg	Lng	TD
1973	DAL	14	6	22	388	17.6	40	2
1974	DAL	14	14	**62**	**1,087**	17.5	50	2
1975	DAL	14	14	46	822	17.9	46	**8**
1976	DAL	14	14	58	806	13.9	40	6
1977	DAL	14	14	48	870	18.1	**67**	2
1978	DAL	**16**	**16**	44	714	16.2	53	3
1979	DAL	15	14	55	1,026	**18.7**	56	**8**
1980	DAL	**16**	15	43	568	13.2	30	6
1981	DAL	**16**	15	38	614	16.2	42	3
1982	DAL	9	8	26	382	14.7	48	3
1983	DAL	14	13	47	545	11.6	32	5
Career		156	143	489	7,822	16.0	67	48

=== Playoffs ===
Year	Team	Games		Receiving				
Year	Team	GP	GS	Rec	Yds	Avg	Lng	TD
1973	DAL	2	2	4	111	**27.8**	**83**	2
1975	DAL	**3**	**3**	11	**196**	17.8	50	2
1976	DAL	1	1	3	38	12.7	22	0
1977	DAL	**3**	**3**	7	113	16.1	31	0
1978	DAL	**3**	**3**	10	167	16.7	39	0
1979	DAL	1	1	3	61	20.3	29	0
1980	DAL	**3**	**3**	11	165	15.0	23	**3**
1981	DAL	2	1	3	52	17.3	31	0
1982	DAL	**3**	**3**	**13**	153	11.8	35	1
1983	DAL	1	1	2	49	24.5	30	0
Career		22	21	67	1,105	16.5	83	8

== After the NFL ==
On April 28, 2017, Pearson was selected to announce a pick at the 2017 NFL draft, which took place at Philadelphia. Amidst boos from the Eagles fans in attendance, he announced Chidobe Awuzie as the 60th pick for the Cowboys.

== Personal life ==
Pearson is married to Marsha, a daughter of Harlem Globetrotters star Marques Haynes.
