= Kurt Petersen (American football) =

American football player (born 1957)

No. 65
- Position: Guard

Personal information
- Born: June 17, 1957 (age 69); St. Louis, Missouri, U.S.
- Listed height: 6 ft 4 in (1.93 m)
- Listed weight: 264 lb (120 kg)

Career information
- High school: Lutheran North (St. Louis)
- College: Missouri
- NFL draft: 1980: 4th round, 105th overall pick

Career history
- Dallas Cowboys (1980–1987)

Awards and highlights
- Second-team All-Pro (1982)

Career NFL statistics
- Games played: 84
- Games started: 66
- Fumble recoveries: 6
- Stats at Pro Football Reference

Kurt David Petersen (born June 17, 1957) is an American former professional football player who was a guard for the Dallas Cowboys of the National Football League (NFL). He played college football for the Missouri Tigers.

== Early life ==
Petersen attended Lutheran High School North in St. Louis, Missouri.

He accepted a football scholarship from the University of Missouri. He was named a starter at "stand-up" defensive end as a sophomore. The next year, he registered 53 tackles (9 for losses). He played a key role in the season opener upset against the University of Notre Dame, when he teamed with linebacker Chris Garlich to stop running back Vagas Ferguson on fourth-down at the Tigers one-yard line.

As a senior, he was moved to defensive tackle, when he was also selected as a team co-captain. He posted 63 tackles and 4 fumble recoveries (tied for the team lead).

== Professional career ==
Petersen was selected by the Dallas Cowboys in the fourth round (105th overall) of the 1980 NFL draft, with the intention of playing him on the offensive line. As a rookie, the offense needed help and like defensive players Blaine Nye and Pat Donovan before him, he was converted into an offensive lineman.

In 1981 he was named the starting right guard, after Robert Shaw went down with a career ending knee injury in the second game, that required previous starter Tom Rafferty to play center.

In 1982, he started all games during a strike shortened season, receiving second-team All-Pro honors. The next year, he missed 2 games with a back injury.

In 1984, he missed 3 games with an injury. On August 19, 1986, he was placed on the injured reserve list after suffering a serious left knee injury that would eventually forced him into early retirement. On September 1, 1987, he was placed on the injured reserve list for a second year in a row with the same injury.

After not being able to fully recover, he retired on February 2, 1988.

== Personal life ==
Petersen currently works as a Financial Advisor.
