= Erik McMillan =

American football player (born 1965)

No. 22, 43, 28, 24
- Positions: Cornerback, safety

Personal information
- Born: May 3, 1965 (age 61); St. Louis, Missouri, U.S.
- Listed height: 6 ft 2 in (1.88 m)
- Listed weight: 197 lb (89 kg)

Career information
- High school: Kennedy (Silver Spring, Maryland)
- College: Missouri
- NFL draft: 1988: 3rd round, 63rd overall pick

Career history
- New York Jets (1988–1992); Philadelphia Eagles (1993); Cleveland Browns (1993); Kansas City Chiefs (1993); Denver Broncos (1996)*
- * Offseason or practice squad member only

Awards and highlights
- AP NFL Defensive Rookie of the Year (1988); 2× Pro Bowl (1988, 1989); PFWA All-Rookie Team (1988); First-team All-Big Eight (1987); Second-team All-Big Eight (1985); NFL record: Most career yards per interception return: 27.6

Career NFL statistics
- Interceptions: 22
- Interception yards: 608
- Defensive touchdowns: 5
- Stats at Pro Football Reference

Erik Charles McMillan (born May 3, 1965) is an American former professional football player who was a defensive back in the National Football League (NFL). He played college football for the Missouri Tigers

McMillan played in the NFL for the New York Jets from 1988 until 1992, Philadelphia Eagles (1993), Cleveland Browns (1993), and Kansas City Chiefs (1993). He was selected by the Jets in the third round of the 1988 NFL draft. McMillan was selected to the Pro Bowl in 1988 and 1989. In 1988, McMillan was named the NFL Defensive Rookie of the Year by the Associated Press. He led the AFC in interceptions that year with eight. McMillan was the first Jets player in team history to play in the Pro Bowl his first two seasons.

He is the son of former St. Louis Cardinals Pro Bowl tackle Ernie McMillan, and first cousin of Howard Richards, former first round pick of the Dallas Cowboys in 1981.
