= Ron Spears =

American football player (born 1959)

No. 78, 79
- Position: Defensive end

Personal information
- Born: November 23, 1959 (age 66); Los Angeles, California, U.S.
- Listed height: 6 ft 6 in (1.98 m)
- Listed weight: 255 lb (116 kg)

Career information
- High school: John Marshall (Los Angeles)
- College: East Los Angeles JC (1977–1978); San Diego State (1979–1980)
- NFL draft: 1981: undrafted

Career history
- Dallas Cowboys (1981-1982)*; New England Patriots (1982–1983); Green Bay Packers (1983-1984)
- * Offseason or practice squad member only

Career NFL statistics
- Sacks: 0.5
- Stats at Pro Football Reference

Ronald Darnell Spears (born November 23, 1959) is an American former professional football player who was a defensive end for two seasons in the National Football League (NFL). He played college football at East Los Angeles Junior College before transferring to the San Diego State Aztecs. He signed with the Dallas Cowboys as an undrafted free agent in 1981. He then was a member of the New England Patriots and Green Bay Packers.

== Early life ==
Spears was born on November 23, 1959, in Los Angeles, California. He attended John Marshall High School in Los Angeles and is one of four of their alumni to play in the NFL. The Los Angeles Times reported him as one of the top area high school performers; he was an all-league selection in football, competed in hurdling for the track and field team and was a center for the basketball team, averaging 17 points and 15 rebounds a game during a portion of his senior season.

== College career ==
Spears began his collegiate career with East Los Angeles Junior College, playing for them from 1977 to 1978 while being a lineman in football. He transferred to San Diego State University to play for the Aztecs in 1979 and transitioned to playing linebacker. He appeared in all 11 games and lettered; he saw limited action at the start of the year before seeing more playing time in the second half of the 1979 season. The Associated Press reported him as being "outstanding" when on the field. The Daily Times-Advocate noted that he played "brilliantly" late-season and Spears finished the year having totaled 14 tackles, 15 assists, four sacks, two fumble recoveries and one interception. Spears played his final season at San Diego State in 1980, lettering, and was regarded as one of the two-best players at his position on the team.

== Professional career ==
After going unselected in the 1981 NFL draft, Spears was signed by the Dallas Cowboys as an undrafted free agent. He became a defensive lineman with the Cowboys and the Fort Worth Star-Telegram mentioned him as one of the best rookie arrivals. However, he suffered a foot injury prior to the regular season and was placed on injured reserve. He was waived at the final roster cuts in September 1982.

One day after being let go by the Cowboys, Spears was claimed off waivers by the New England Patriots. He appeared in seven regular season games, none as a starter, for the Patriots. He also saw action in one playoff game for the team. He impressed the team in training camp entering the 1983 season, but his play declined significantly in preseason and although he made the initial roster, he was released after starting just the opener against the Baltimore Colts.

Shortly after being released by New England, Spears signed with the Green Bay Packers as a replacement for the injured Greg Boyd. He appeared in 13 games with one start for the Packers, recording 0.5 sacks as the team went 8–8. He was released by the team in May 1984, ending his professional career. He finished his four-year stint in the NFL with 21 games played, two as a starter, and 0.5 sacks.

== Later life ==
Spears received a Bachelor of Science from San Diego State and worked six years with information technology companies after his time in the NFL, after which he joined the University of California, San Diego (UCSD) in the same area in 1990. He became the Director of Information Technology for the UCSD School of Medicine in 1993.
