= Phil Pozderac =

American football player (born 1959)

No. 75
- Position: Tackle

Personal information
- Born: December 19, 1959 (age 66); Cleveland, Ohio, U.S.
- Listed height: 6 ft 9 in (2.06 m)
- Listed weight: 277 lb (126 kg)

Career information
- High school: Garfield Heights (OH)
- College: Notre Dame
- NFL draft: 1982: 5th round, 137th overall pick

Career history
- Dallas Cowboys (1982–1987); Indianapolis Colts (1991)*
- * Offseason or practice squad member only

Career NFL statistics
- Games played: 70
- Games Started: 37
- Stats at Pro Football Reference

Philip Maurice Pozderac (born December 19, 1959) is an American former professional football player who was an offensive lineman for the Dallas Cowboys of the National Football League (NFL). He played college football for the Notre Dame Fighting Irish.

== Early life ==
Pozderac attended Garfield Heights High School, where he practiced basketball and football.

He accepted a football scholarship to the University of Notre Dame. In his first two years he was a backup at right tackle behind All-American Tim Foley. He was named the starter at right tackle in his junior and senior seasons.

In his last year, he received the team's Outstanding Offensive player and honorable-mention All-American honors. He finished his college career with 23 straight starts.

== Professional career ==
=== Dallas Cowboys ===
Pozderac was selected by the Dallas Cowboys in the fifth round (137th overall) of the 1982 NFL draft and became the NFL's tallest player over Ed "Too Tall" Jones (he was a half-inch taller than Jones). As a rookie, with tight end Jay Saldi injured most of the year, he played left tackle on short-yardage situations, with Pat Donovan moving to the tight end spot.

In 1983, he started two regular season contests in place of an injured Donovan and played left tackle on all short-yardage and goal situations when the Cowboys went to a 3 three-tight end formation. He started the 7th game of the season against the Philadelphia Eagles at right tackle in place of an injured Jim Cooper.

In 1984, after the retirement of Donovan, he beat former first round selection Howard Richards for the starting left tackle job (7 starts), before being moved to the right tackle position, when Cooper missed half of the season after being injured on a bizarre accident, when he slipped and broke his ankle while rising from a table at a night club, while watching Monday Night Football.

In 1985, he was the starter at left tackle until an injured right knee forced him out of the lineup after 3 starts. He returned to start 4 more games, until being moved to the right side to back up Cooper, with Chris Schultz keeping the left side job.

In 1986, he was the starter left tackle, before losing his job to Mark Tuinei and being moved to the other side. He also received two infamous penalties that negated critical first downs during the final 75 seconds of a 17–14 loss against the New York Giants, propelling the team to a Super Bowl Championship. The coaches and media speculated that he became a target of the league's referees, gaining notoriety for holding and false start penalties. A standing joke in Dallas would be to list Pozderac's 5 best plays with the answer being - #1 Holding, #2 Holding, #3 Holding, #4 Holding, #5 False start.

He suddenly retired during the 1987 NFL strike and was replaced by rookie Kevin Gogan at right tackle.

=== Indianapolis Colts ===
On April 26, 1991, he signed with the Indianapolis Colts to attempt a comeback, after being out of football for 3 years. He was released before the start of the season on August 26.

== Personal life ==
Pozderac served as the NFL Players Association Dallas Chapter chief financial officer, director of sales for SC&T International, VP of sales for Nextlink, and CEO of both MedPact and MPACT, two companies in the digital communication industry.

He has worked with the Fellows Research Group to aid research regarding the viability of thermo-acoustic devices for low temperature electric energy generation. He also had part ownership in a manufactured housing plant in Laredo Texas and a sawmill in Oklahoma. As of 2013, he was the operations director at the Mulligan Mint, a private minting facility in Dallas, Texas.
