= Ron Fellows (American football) =

American football player (born 1957)

No. 27, 21
- Position: Cornerback

Personal information
- Born: November 7, 1957 (age 68); South Bend, Indiana, U.S.
- Listed height: 6 ft 0 in (1.83 m)
- Listed weight: 178 lb (81 kg)

Career information
- High school: Washington (South Bend)
- College: Missouri
- NFL draft: 1981: 7th round, 173rd overall pick

Career history
- Dallas Cowboys (1981–1986); Los Angeles Raiders (1987–1988)

Awards and highlights
- Second-team All-Big Eight (1980)

Career NFL statistics
- Games played: 112
- Interceptions: 19
- Fumble recoveries: 9
- Stats at Pro Football Reference

Ronald Lee Fellows (born November 7, 1957) is an American former professional football player who was a cornerback in the National Football League (NFL) for the Dallas Cowboys and Los Angeles Raiders. He played college football for the Missouri Tigers.

== Early life ==
Fellows attended Washington High School, where he lettered in football, track and basketball. In football, he was a two-way player, as a running back and safety. He helped his team win the Northern Indiana Conference championship in 1975 and 1976. As a senior, he received South Bend Tribune Offensive Player of the Year and All-State offensive/defensive back honors.

He was named All-Conference in track and basketball. In 1977, he won the IHSAA 120 yards high hurdles state championship.

In 2014, he was inducted into the Indiana Football Hall of Fame.

== College career ==
Fellows moved on to Butler Community College, where he played as a cornerback for two seasons. He also ran the hurdles.

He transferred to the University of Missouri after his sophomore season. As a junior, midway through the 1979 season, he was converted into a wide receiver, posting 4 receptions for 44 yards and no touchdowns.

As a senior, he led the Big Eight Conference in receiving with 587 yards on 33 receptions (led the team), while also catching 4 touchdowns (led the team).

== Professional career ==
=== Dallas Cowboys ===
Fellows was selected by the Dallas Cowboys in the seventh round (173rd overall) of the 1981 NFL draft, with the intention of playing him at cornerback. By the eleventh game of his rookie season, he was being used on the nickel defense.

In 1982, he played right corner on obvious passing downs, with starter Dennis Thurman being moved to safety. He also led the team in punt and kickoff returns.

In 1983, he played nickel cornerback over former first-round draft choice Rod Hill, while posting 5 interceptions (second on the team). Against the New Orleans Saints, he returned a blocked field goal for a game winning 62-yard touchdown, the first such return by a Cowboy in 19 years. He returned an interception for a 58-yard touchdown against the Minnesota Vikings. He also tied a team record with 43 kickoff returns.

Fellows was part of an opportunistic Cowboys secondary that earned the nickname "Thurman's Thieves", because of the amount of plays and turnovers they generated.

In 1984, after Thurman made the permanent switch to safety, he became the starter at right cornerback opposite Everson Walls, and posted 3 interceptions. He returned a blocked field goal for a 62-yard touchdown against the New Orleans Saints, the first such return for a Cowboy in 19 years. He had 2 interceptions, including one returned for a 58-yard touchdown and 4 kickoff returns for 109 yards against the Minnesota Vikings.

In 1985, he struggled with a sprained knee he suffered in the first quarter of the season opener against the Washington Redskins, which caused him to miss 3 games and 2 starts, eventually requiring offseason surgery. He still managed to make 4 interceptions (tied for third on the team) and 20 passes defensed (second on the team).

In 1986, he finished first on the team with 15 passes defensed and second with 5 interceptions, including a 34-yard return for a touchdown against the St. Louis Cardinals. He had 4 turnovers (2 interceptions and 2 fumble recoveries) against the Chicago Bears.

On August 2, 1987, after being involved in a contract holdout and the Cowboys needing help at wide receiver, the team felt they had depth at cornerback after drafting Ron Francis, so he was traded to the Los Angeles Raiders in exchange for Rod Barksdale.

=== Los Angeles Raiders ===
In 1987, Fellows was the team's nickel cornerback, appearing in 12 games with 2 starts.

He was waived on August 29, 1988, but was re-signed after Terry McDaniel was lost for the year with a broken leg in the second game of the season. He appeared in 14 games with 10 starts at left cornerback, registering 2 interceptions and 2 fumble recoveries. He was not re-signed after the season.

== Personal life ==
Fellows married wife Debra in 2002 and founded the Stars for Life Foundation, a nonprofit aimed at serving Native American communities suffering from addiction, diabetes and suicide. It now educates the public on the long-term dangers of impact sports. He was diagnosed with Alzheimer's disease in 2015.
