= Tom Rafferty =

American football player (1954–2025)

No. 64
- Positions: Center, guard

Personal information
- Born: August 2, 1954; Syracuse, New York, U.S.
- Died: June 5, 2025 (aged 70); Windsor, Colorado, U.S.
- Listed height: 6 ft 3 in (1.91 m)
- Listed weight: 256 lb (116 kg)

Career information
- High school: Fayetteville–Manlius (Manlius, New York)
- College: Penn State
- NFL draft: 1976: 4th round, 119th overall pick

Career history
- Dallas Cowboys (1976–1989)

Awards and highlights
- Super Bowl champion (XII); First-team All-American (1975); 2× First-team All-East (1974, 1975); Greater Syracuse Sports Hall of Fame

Career NFL statistics
- Games played: 203
- Games started: 182
- Stats at Pro Football Reference

Thomas Michael Rafferty (August 2, 1954 – June 5, 2025) was an American professional football player who was an offensive lineman for 14 seasons with the Dallas Cowboys of the National Football League (NFL). He played college football for the Penn State Nittany Lions under head coach Joe Paterno.

== Early life ==
Born in Syracuse, New York, Rafferty attended Fayetteville-Manlius High School in Manlius, where he received all-league honors as a defensive lineman in football and also in lacrosse.

== College career ==
Rafferty accepted a scholarship from Penn State University, where he was converted into an offensive lineman. In 1973, Rafferty played tackle and was a part of an undefeated season (12–0). He became a starter at guard as a junior in 1974 and was named a captain for the 1975 season. Rafferty was named to the UPI's All-East team in 1974 and 1975 and to the Football News and Football Writers' All-American team in 1975.

== Professional career ==
Rafferty was selected by the Dallas Cowboys in the fourth round (119th overall) of the 1976 NFL draft. As a rookie, he was a backup to Blaine Nye, but the next year, he was named the starter at right guard, performing also as a long snapper for field goals and extra points, on a team that won Super Bowl XII over the Denver Broncos.

During this Cowboys era, center John Fitzgerald nicknamed the Dallas offensive line as the "Four Irishmen and a Scot(t)," when it was formed by him, Rafferty, Pat Donovan, Jim Cooper and Herb Scott.

Known to his teammates as "Raff," he established himself as one of the better linemen in Cowboys history with an exemplary work ethic, durability and versatility. In 1981, he was moved to center after Robert Shaw went down with a career-ending knee injury, becoming the anchor of an offensive line that would enable the Cowboys to reach two NFC Championship Games.

Among Rafferty's career highlights, he and Scott teamed on the block that cleared the way for Tony Dorsett's 99-yard run against the Minnesota Vikings on Monday Night Football in 1983 (incredibly the Cowboys only had 10 men on the field for the play). That same season, Rafferty had his lone career reception, catching a deflected pass from Dallas quarterback Danny White for an eight-yard gain in a 37-7 win against the Philadelphia Eagles.

In 1989, Rafferty started the first eight games before rookie Mark Stepnoski took over the center position. He announced his retirement on April 21, 1990. Overall, he played in 203 regular season games for the Cowboys, including 167 consecutive games from 1976-87. At the time of his retirement, he ranked among the franchise's all-time leaders in seasons played, games played, consecutive games played and games started. He also appeared in eighteen post-season games and two Super Bowls (XII, XIII).

== Personal life and death ==
Rafferty earned his Bachelor of Science in physical education from Penn State University in 1976, and later earned an MBA from the University of Dallas.

Following his football career, he lived with his wife, Donna, and their children, Michael and Rachel, in Keller, Texas, where he was a regional sales manager at Sports Supply Group, a Dallas sports supply company. In April 2008, he had a sudden bout of the neurological disorder transverse myelitis. The disorder caused him to use a walker and wheelchair while undergoing physical therapy to re-learn how to walk.

In 1998, Rafferty was inducted into the Greater Syracuse Sports Hall of Fame. In 2000, he was made an inaugural member of Fayetteville-Manlius Hall of Distinction.

Rafferty died after a stroke on June 5, 2025, at the age of 70.
