= Jim Cooper (American football) =

American football player (born 1955)

No. 61
- Position: Offensive tackle

Personal information
- Born: September 28, 1955 (age 71); Philadelphia, Pennsylvania, U.S.
- Listed height: 6 ft 5 in (1.96 m)
- Listed weight: 262 lb (119 kg)

Career information
- High school: Dougherty (Philadelphia)
- College: Temple
- NFL draft: 1977: 6th round, 164th overall pick

Career history
- Dallas Cowboys (1977–1986)

Awards and highlights
- Super Bowl champion (XII)

Career NFL statistics
- Games played: 133
- Game started: 99
- Stats at Pro Football Reference

James Albert Cooper (born September 28, 1955) is an American former professional football player who was an offensive lineman in the National Football League (NFL) for the Dallas Cowboys. He played college football for the Temple Owls.

== Early life ==
Cooper attended Cardinal Dougherty High School in Philadelphia, not far from Temple University. He was a two sport athlete, earning varsity letters in football, and track.

He was the Catholic League champ in the shot put. His teammates elected him captain in both sports during his senior year.

== College career ==
Cooper accepted a football scholarship from Temple University. He played both on the offensive and defensive lines, before settling at offensive tackle, where he was a three-year starter.

He was inducted into the Philadelphia Chapter of the Pennsylvania Sports Hall of Fame.

== Professional career ==
Cooper was selected by the Dallas Cowboys in the sixth round (164th overall) of the 1977 NFL draft. It proved difficult at first, almost being traded to the Denver Broncos along with fullback Jim Jensen and getting released at the end of training camp on September 9. On September 16, he was re-signed after Jim Eidson was lost for the year with a knee injury. He took advantage of this second opportunity, by learning 3 positions (Tackle, Guard, Center) and becoming the most versatile offensive lineman on the team. As a rookie, he mostly backed up both guard positions.

In 1978, he was listed as the backup at center. In 1979, he started the first 11 games at right tackle, while Rayfield Wright was recovering from a knee injury.

In 1980, he took over the starting position after Wright retired. center John Fitzgerald nicknamed the Cowboys offensive line as the "Four Irishmen and a Scott", when it was formed by him, Fitzgerald, Pat Donovan, Tom Rafferty and Herb Scott.

In the 1982 season, he helped blocked on Tony Dorsett's record 99-yard touchdown run against the Minnesota Vikings.

In 1984, he missed half of the season, after being injured on a bizarre accident, when he slipped while rising from a table at a night club, while watching Monday Night Football. He dislocated his right ankle and in the process broke a bone and ligaments. He was replaced by Phil Pozderac the rest of the season.

In 1985, he started 15 games, missing the season finale with a neck injury. Cooper retired in 1986, after being injured most of that year. He finished his career after playing in 133 games, including 2 Super Bowls.

== Personal life ==
After retirement, he focused on managing his family owned company Industrial Container Services.
