= John Fitzgerald (center) =

American football player (1948–2026)

No. 62
- Position: Center

Personal information
- Born: April 16, 1948; Southbridge, Massachusetts, U.S.
- Died: April 14, 2026 (aged 77)
- Listed height: 6 ft 5 in (1.96 m)
- Listed weight: 255 lb (116 kg)

Career information
- High school: Southbridge
- College: Boston College
- NFL draft: 1970: 4th round, 101st overall pick

Career history
- Dallas Cowboys (1970–1981)

Awards and highlights
- 2× Super Bowl champion (VI, XII)

Career NFL statistics
- Games played: 137
- Games started: 108
- Fumble recoveries: 6
- Stats at Pro Football Reference

John Robert Fitzgerald (April 16, 1948 – April 14, 2026) was an American professional football player who was a center for the Dallas Cowboys of the National Football League (NFL). He was selected in the fourth round of the 1970 NFL draft. He played college football for the Boston College Eagles.

== Early life ==
Fitzgerald attended Southbridge High School in Southbridge, Massachusetts, where he started as a 315 lb fullback. He also competed in the shot put.

He accepted a football scholarship from Boston College, where he became a two-way tackle, playing both offense and defense during his three-year varsity career.

In 1982, Fitzgerald was inducted into the Boston College Varsity Club Athletic Hall of Fame.

== Professional career ==
Fitzgerald was selected by the Dallas Cowboys in the fourth round (101st overall) of the 1970 NFL draft. The team played him first as a defensive tackle, before trying him at different offensive line positions. He was waived before the start of the season on September 2. He was later signed to the taxi squad.

In 1971, Fitzgerald was a backup at offensive guard. In 1972, he was converted into a center during training camp and was the backup behind Dave Manders.

In 1973, Fitzgerald took over the starting position from Manders, at the time, he was taller than the prototype center. In 1974, he missed two games, but was able to start most of the season while limited with an injured knee and an injured elbow.

In 1975, head coach Tom Landry re-introduced to the NFL the shotgun formation. Fitzgerald took great pride in making it work, with his ability to snap the ball 7 yards back without looking.

In 1977, Fitzgerald missed two games with knee and ankle injuries. He re-injured the knee during a practice in December, but still managed to play throughout the playoffs. In 1978, he missed 2 games while battling through ankle, shoulder, and back spasms problems.

In 1979, Fitzgerald named the offensive line as the "Four Irishmen and a Scott", referring to himself, Pat Donovan, Jim Cooper, Tom Rafferty, and Herb Scott.

In 1980, Fitzgerald missed two regular season games and three playoff contests with shoulder and knee injuries. Robert Shaw was his replacement.

On August 31, 1981, Fitzgerald was placed on the injured reserve list. On January 11, 1982, he announced his retirement due to injuries and Tom Rafferty being already entrenched at the starting center position took over completely.

Fitzgerald never appeared in a Pro Bowl, but still became a central part of a strong offensive line in Dallas for most of the decade. He helped the Cowboys win 2 Super Bowl championships and make playoff appearances every season except one during his time. He played in 138 games over 10 NFL seasons.

== Death ==
Fitzgerald died on April 14, 2026, two days short of his 78th birthday.
