= Herbert Scott (American football) =

American football player (born 1953)

No. 68
- Positions: Guard, offensive tackle

Personal information
- Born: January 18, 1953 (age 73); Virginia Beach, Virginia, U.S.
- Listed height: 6 ft 2 in (1.88 m)
- Listed weight: 254 lb (115 kg)

Career information
- High school: Floyd E. Kellam (Virginia Beach)
- College: Virginia Union (1971–1974)
- NFL draft: 1975: 13th round, 330th overall pick

Career history
- Dallas Cowboys (1975–1984)

Awards and highlights
- Super Bowl champion (XII); 2× First-team All-Pro (1980, 1981); 3× Pro Bowl (1979–1981); First-team Little All-American (1973)

Career NFL statistics
- Games played: 140
- Games started: 114
- Fumble recoveries: 2
- Stats at Pro Football Reference

Herbert Carnell Scott (born January 18, 1953) is an American former professional football player who was a guard and offensive tackle for the Dallas Cowboys of the National Football League (NFL). He played college football for the Virginia Union Panthers, earning All-Central Intercollegiate Athletic Association three times.

== Early life ==
After playing football at Kellam High School, Scott chose to attend Virginia Union University, an HBCU located in Richmond, Virginia.

Scott was a four-year starter, 1971–74, and was twice named (1973 and 1974) All-CIAA and NCAA Division II All-American, becoming the first player from Virginia Union University to receive this honor. He was also part of Virginia Union University first -CIAA football title in 50 years when the 1973 Panthers finished 9–1, which included six shutouts.

In 1982, he was inducted into the Central Intercollegiate Athletic Association (CIAA) Hall of Fame.

In 1988, he was inducted into the Virginia Union Sports Hall of Fame.

In 2006, he was inducted into the Virginia Sports Hall of Fame.

== Professional career ==
Scott was selected by the Dallas Cowboys in the 13th round of the 1975 NFL draft as an offensive guard. He was one of 12 drafted rookies who made the team that year – hence the "Dirty Dozen" nickname for the Cowboys' 1975 draft, that helped the team reach Super Bowl X. The "Dirty Dozen" rookie class didn't include linebacker Mike Hegman, who was drafted that year but did not arrive until 1976 or rookie free agent quarterback Jim Zorn, who made the team, but was later cut to make room for running back Preston Pearson, who had just been released by the Pittsburgh Steelers.

His skills and development allowed the Cowboys in 1975 to trade John Niland, who had previously been to six Pro Bowls. The draft pick they received from the Philadelphia Eagles was used to select wide receiver Tony Hill.

Scott became a full-time starter at left guard in 1976 and became a fixture at the offensive line through the 1984 season. Steady and rarely penalized, he emerged as one of the top guards in the league during the late 70s and early 80s and together with Pat Donovan formed one of the best left-side tandems in the NFL.

During his time with the Cowboys, center John Fitzgerald nicknamed the Cowboys' offensive line as the "Four Irishmen and a Scott", when it was formed by Fitzgerald, Scott, Jim Cooper, Tom Rafferty and Pat Donovan. That group helped pave the way for Tony Dorsett's Hall of Fame rushing career.

In 1980, Scott became the Cowboys' first All-Pro offensive lineman since Rayfield Wright in 1975. He was a two-time first-team All-Pro and a three-time Pro Bowler, attending the game from 1979 through 1981. Teammate Tony Dorsett once said, "When Herb goes after a guy, the next thing you see are feet in the air."

Among his memorable moments, he and Tom Rafferty teamed on the block that cleared the way for Dorsett's 99-yard run against the Minnesota Vikings on Monday Night Football in 1983. Scott also caught Roger Staubach's final career pass, in a playoff loss to the Los Angeles Rams in 1979, but as an offensive lineman, he was ruled an ineligible receiver and the Cowboys were penalized, negating the play.

Injuries slowed Scott later in his career, when he saw some action as a tackle, retiring after the 1984 season.

Scott's entire professional career in the NFL was spent with the Cowboys (1975–1984). He was a mainstay and cornerstone of the Cowboys' offensive line during those 10 seasons. He helped the Cowboys win Super Bowl XII and three NFC Championships.
