= Tony Dorsett =

American football player (born 1954)

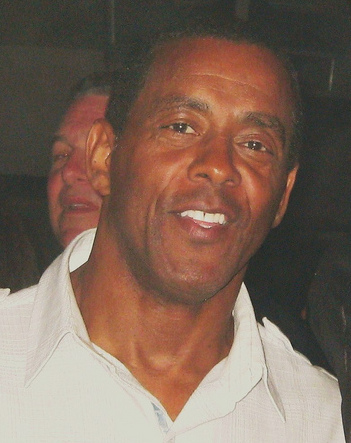
- Dorsett in 2009

No. 33
- Position: Running back

Personal information
- Born: April 7, 1954 (age 72); Rochester, Pennsylvania, U.S.
- Listed height: 5 ft 11 in (1.80 m)
- Listed weight: 192 lb (87 kg)

Career information
- High school: Hopewell (Aliquippa, Pennsylvania)
- College: Pittsburgh (1973–1976)
- NFL draft: 1977: 1st round, 2nd overall pick

Career history
- Dallas Cowboys (1977–1987); Denver Broncos (1988)

Awards and highlights
- Super Bowl champion (XII); NFL Offensive Rookie of the Year (1977); First-team All-Pro (1981); 2× Second-team All-Pro (1982, 1983); 4× Pro Bowl (1978, 1981–1983); Dallas Cowboys Ring of Honor; National champion (1976); Heisman Trophy (1976); Unanimous All-American (1976); 2× First-team All-American (1973, 1975); Second-team All-American (1974); Second-team AP All-Time All-American (2025); Pittsburgh Panthers No. 33 retired; NFL record: 99-yard rushing touchdown (Note: Tied with Derrick Henry)

Career NFL statistics
- Rushing yards: 12,739
- Rushing average: 4.3
- Rushing touchdowns: 77
- Receptions: 398
- Receiving yards: 3,554
- Receiving touchdowns: 13
- Stats at Pro Football Reference
- Pro Football Hall of Fame
- College Football Hall of Fame

Anthony Drew Dorsett Sr. (born April 7, 1954) is an American former professional football running back who played in the National Football League (NFL) for the Dallas Cowboys and Denver Broncos.

Raised in western Pennsylvania, Dorsett played college football for the Pittsburgh Panthers, where he led the Panthers to the national championship as a senior in the 1976 season and won the Heisman Trophy. He was the first-round, second overall draft choice of the Dallas Cowboys in the 1977 NFL draft. Dorsett was the NFL Offensive Rookie of the Year and played for the team for 11 seasons until 1987. He won a Super Bowl in his rookie season over the Denver Broncos, with whom he spent his final season before retiring due to injuries. He is a member of the Pro Football Hall of Fame (1994) and College Football Hall of Fame (1994).

== Early life ==
The son of Wes and Myrtle, Dorsett grew up in Aliquippa, Pennsylvania, northwest of Pittsburgh. He attended Hopewell High School, where he played football and basketball.

As a high school sophomore in 1970, Dorsett started at cornerback, as his coaches did not believe the 147-pound Dorsett was big enough to play running back, the position he played in junior high school. In 1971, a competition between Dorsett and sophomore Michael Kimbrough for the starting running back position ended after Dorsett took a screen pass 75 yards for a touchdown against Ambridge during the season opener.

Dorsett ended the year as an All-State selection after rushing for 1,034 yards and scoring 19 touchdowns, while leading the Vikings to a 9–1 season. He also remained a starting cornerback on the defensive side. In basketball, Dorsett helped his team reach the WPIAL quarterfinals.

In 1972, Dorsett was again an All-state Selection, after setting a single-game rushing record with 247 yards against Sharon, a single-season rushing record with 1,238 yards and the career rushing record with 2,272 yards, while leading the Vikings to a 9–1 season. Dorsett was also a key player on the defensive side as one of the starting linebackers.

For all the ability he had, Dorsett could never lead his team to the WPIAL Class AA playoffs, because in those days teams had to have an undefeated record. The team's only loss in 1971 came against Sharon after Dorsett experienced a concussion and played less than a quarter, and the only loss in 1972 came against Butler while playing on a muddy field.

At the end of his senior season, he played in the Big 33 Football Classic. This was the first time that his future coach Johnny Majors saw him play live.

Later, the school retired his 33 jersey. In 2001, Hopewell's Stadium was renamed Tony Dorsett Stadium.

== College career ==
The NCAA had granted freshmen permission to play varsity football in 1972, and in 1973 at the University of Pittsburgh, Dorsett became the first freshman in 29 years to be named All-American. Doc Blanchard of Army was the previous one in 1944, the freshmen restriction having been temporarily suspended during World War II. Dorsett finished second in the nation in rushing with 1,586 yards in 11 games and led the Pittsburgh Panthers to its first winning season in 10 years. He was Pittsburgh's first All-American selection since the 1963 season, when both Paul Martha and Ernie Borghetti were named to the first team. His 1,586 rushing yards at the time was the most ever recorded by a freshman, breaking the record set by New Mexico State's Ron "Po" James record in 1968. James, like Dorsett, hailed from Beaver County, Pennsylvania, specifically New Brighton. Although Dorsett was known as Anthony, the school's athletic department convinced him to go by Tony, to use the marketable initials TD as in touchdown.

At the beginning of Dorsett's freshman year at Pitt, his son Anthony Dorsett was born on September 14, 1973. Later in the 1973 season, Dorsett faced some criticism when it became known that his son was born out of wedlock, with some observers contending that he should drop out of school and marry his son's mother and financially support his family. Dorsett believed that the best way to care for his son was to continue to pursue his football career, a tactic that succeeded due to his successful professional career.

Three games into his sophomore season, he became Pitt's all-time leader in career rushing yards, surpassing the old record of 1,957 yards set by Marshall Goldberg, who helped Pitt to a national championship in 1937.

Against Notre Dame in his junior year, Dorsett had 303 yards rushing to break his own school single-game rushing record. As a senior in 1976, he had a total of 290 yards against Notre Dame. He darted 61 yards on his first run of the season and tacked on 120 more by the end of the 31–10 Pitt win.

As a senior in 1976, he helped lead his school to a national title, picking up the Heisman Trophy, the Maxwell Award, the Walter Camp Award for player of the year, and the United Press International (UPI) Player of the Year award along the way as he led the nation in rushing with 2,150 yards and 21 touchdowns (23 total). He was a three-time first-team All-American (1973, 1975, 1976) and a second-team All-American in 1974 by UPI and Newspaper Enterprise Association (NEA). Dorsett finished his college career with 6,082 total rushing yards, then an NCAA record. This would stand as the record until it was surpassed by Ricky Williams in 1998.

Dorsett was the first Pitt player to have his jersey retired, after being a four-time 1,000-yard rusher and four-time All-American. He is considered one of the greatest running backs in college football history. In 2007, he was ranked #7 on ESPN's Top 25 Players in College Football History list. In 1994, he was inducted into the College Football Hall of Fame.

== Professional career ==
=== Dallas Cowboys ===
Ahead of the 1977 NFL draft, scouts were skeptical about Dorsett's potential at the professional level, citing his small size as his primary liability in his long-term durability. After being passed over by the Tampa Bay Buccaneers with the first overall pick, the Dallas Cowboys selected him with the second overall pick, which they had acquired from the Seattle Seahawks in exchange for the 14th overall (Steve August), 30th overall (Tom Lynch), 41st overall (Terry Beeson), and 54th overall (Glenn Carano) picks; Dorsett had previously told the Seahawks that he would not play for them. Dorsett signed a five-year contract worth a reported $1.1 million, becoming the first contract in Cowboys history to exceed $1 million; it was the second-largest contract signed for a rookie that season, with first overall pick Ricky Bell beating Dorsett with a $1.2 million contract.

From the beginning, Dorsett and head coach Tom Landry had differing opinions on how he should run the ball. Landry initially designed precise running plays, but was eventually convinced that Dorsett was a different type of running back and instructed the offensive line to block and hold their man, while Dorsett chose the running lane with his gifted vision and instincts.

In 1977, Dorsett's rookie year, he provided an instant impact, rushing for 1,007 yards (including a 206-yard rushing effort against the Philadelphia Eagles), scoring 12 touchdowns, and earning rookie of the year honors. He set a new Cowboys rookie record and was also the only Cowboy to rush for more than 1,000 yards in his rookie season. He held the record for 39 years, until 2016, when Ezekiel Elliott surpassed 1,000 yards in his 9th game and broke Dorsett's record in game 10 with 1,102 yards.

He was named the starter in the 10th game of the season, and became the first player to win the college football championship, then win the Super Bowl the next year, when the Cowboys beat the Denver Broncos 27–10 in Super Bowl XII. In his second season, Dorsett recorded 1,325 yards and 9 touchdowns, with the Cowboys once again reaching the Super Bowl, although they lost 35–31 to the Pittsburgh Steelers in Super Bowl XIII.

In 1980, he had one of his best runs. With the ball on the four-yard line against the St. Louis Cardinals, the right defensive end and linebacker had penetration, while the two cornerbacks were blitzing. Dorsett suddenly pivoted on his right foot, turned 360 degrees, and ran wide around the left side, beating the safety and eluding a total of five defenders for a touchdown without being touched.

His most productive season was in 1981, when he recorded 1,646 yards, breaking the Cowboys' franchise record.

In 1982, his streak of five straight years with at least 1,000 rushing yards was interrupted by the strike-shortened season. Dallas only played 9 games, with Dorsett registering 745 yards and five touchdowns. In the final regular-season game against the Minnesota Vikings, he set a record that can only be tied, with a 99-yard touchdown run. Derrick Henry tied his record with a 99-yard touchdown run in 2018.

Prior to the 1985 season, he held out, demanding that his contract be renegotiated. Defensive tackle Randy White had been given a larger contract by the Cowboys.

In 1986, running back Herschel Walker was signed by the Cowboys and moved to fullback, so he could share backfield duties with Dorsett, becoming the second Heisman backfield tandem in NFL history, after George Rogers and Earl Campbell were teammates on the 1984 New Orleans Saints. This move created tension, as it would limit Dorsett's playing time, and because Walker's $5 million five-year contract exceeded his $4.5 million five-year contract. Although Dorsett was slowed by ankle and knee injuries that caused him to miss three games, he still led the Cowboys in rushing for the 10th consecutive season with 748 yards.

In 1987, Walker complained to Cowboys management that he was being moved around between three different positions (running back, fullback, wide receiver) and that Dorsett had more carries. He took over as the team's main running back, with Dorsett playing in 12 games (six starts) and rushing for 456 yards on 130 carries. Dorsett was not played in two games despite being healthy, which made him demand a trade.

On June 2, 1988, Dorsett was traded to the Denver Broncos in exchange for a conditional fifth-round draft choice. He left as the franchise's rushing leader (12,036 yards) and second in league history in postseason rushing yards (1,383).

=== Denver Broncos ===
The Denver Broncos acquired Dorsett because they were desperate to improve their running game. He reunited with former Cowboys offensive coordinator Dan Reeves and at the age of 34, he reportedly could still run 40 yards in 4.3 seconds. With the retirement of Walter Payton the previous year, he was the career leader in rushing yards among active players. He also had a positive impact on the offense until being limited with injuries late in the season, appearing in 16 games (13 starts), while leading the team with 703 rushing yards and five rushing touchdowns. In a November 27, 1988 game against the Los Angeles Rams, Dorsett threw the only touchdown pass of his career (only the second pass completion in eight career attempts, with one interception), for 7 yards to fellow running back Sammy Winder.

On September 26, 1988, Dorsett moved into second place on the all-time rushing list with 12,306 yards, and finished his career with 12,739 yards, trailing only Walter Payton. He retired after having torn left knee ligaments during training camp the following season.

== Legacy ==
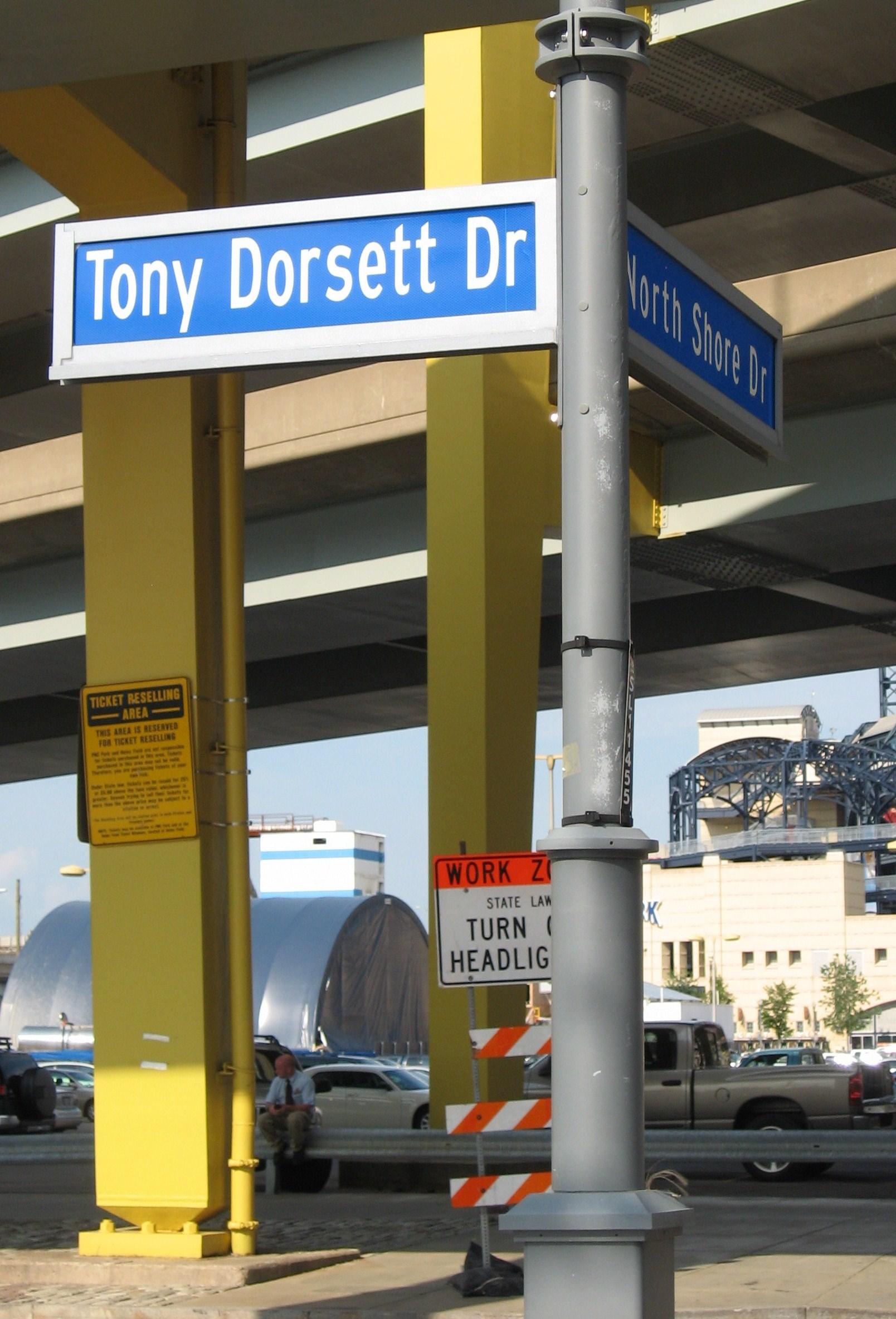
Tony Dorsett Drive near Acrisure Stadium in Pittsburgh's North Shore neighborhood

Dorsett rushed for 12,739 yards and 77 touchdowns in his 12-year career. Dorsett also had 13 receiving scores and even a fumble recovery for a touchdown. On January 3, 1983, during a Monday Night Football game in Minnesota, Dorsett broke a 99-yard touchdown run against the Vikings, which is the longest run from scrimmage in NFL history (Derrick Henry of the Tennessee Titans would tie this record in 2018). Dorsett broke the previous record of 97 yards, set by Andy Uram in 1939 and Bob Gage in 1949. The Cowboys only had 10 men on the field at the time, as fullback Ron Springs was unaware of the play being called. Despite the feat, the Cowboys lost the game 31–27.

Dorsett made the Pro Bowl four times during his career (1978, 1981–1983) and rushed for over 1,000 yards in 8 of his first 9 seasons. Of his 12 NFL seasons, he surpassed 1,000 yards eight times. During the strike-shortened, 9-game season of 1982, he led the NFC in rushing with 745 yards. He was a First-team All-Pro in 1981 and a Second-team All-Pro in 1982 and 1983.

Dorsett was elected to both the Pro Football Hall of Fame and the College Football Hall of Fame in 1994 and was enshrined in the Texas Stadium Ring of Honor the same year. In 1999, he was ranked number 53 on The Sporting News' list of the 100 Greatest Football Players. He is the first of only two players in history (along with former running back Marcus Allen) who has won the Heisman Trophy, won the Super Bowl, won the College National Championship, been enshrined in the College Hall of Fame, and been enshrined in the Pro Football Hall Of Fame.

The football stadium at Hopewell High School in Aliquippa, Pennsylvania, is named after Dorsett and a street near Acrisure Stadium, the home stadium of the University of Pittsburgh, is named after him.

== NFL career statistics ==
Year	Team	Games		Rushing							Receiving							Fumbles	
Year	Team	GP	GS	Att	Yds	Avg	Lng	TD	A/G	Y/G	Rec	Yds	Avg	Lng	TD	R/G	Y/G	Fum	Lost
1977	DAL	14	4	208	1,007	4.8	84	12	14.9	71.9	29	273	9.4	23	1	2.1	19.5	7	0
1978	DAL	16	15	290	1,325	4.6	63	7	18.1	82.8	37	378	10.2	91	2	2.3	23.6	12	0
1979	DAL	14	14	250	1,107	4.4	41	6	17.9	79.1	45	375	8.3	32	1	3.2	26.8	9	0
1980	DAL	15	15	278	1,185	4.3	56	11	18.5	79.0	34	263	7.7	27	0	2.3	17.5	8	0
1981	DAL	16	16	342	1,646	4.8	75	4	21.4	102.9	32	325	10.2	73	2	2.0	20.3	10	6
1982	DAL	9	9	177	745	4.2	99	5	19.7	82.8	24	179	7.5	18	0	2.7	19.9	6	2
1983	DAL	16	16	289	1,321	4.6	77	8	18.1	82.6	40	287	7.2	24	1	2.5	17.9	5	4
1984	DAL	16	16	302	1,189	3.9	31	6	18.9	74.3	51	459	9.0	68	1	3.2	28.7	12	8
1985	DAL	16	16	305	1,307	4.3	60	7	19.1	81.7	46	449	9.8	56	3	2.9	28.1	7	4
1986	DAL	13	12	184	748	4.1	33	5	14.2	57.5	25	267	10.7	36	1	1.9	20.5	5	3
1987	DAL	12	6	130	456	3.5	24	1	10.8	38.0	19	177	9.3	33	1	1.6	14.8	3	3
1988	DEN	16	13	181	703	3.9	26	5	11.3	43.9	16	122	7.6	16	0	1.0	7.6	6	3
Career		173	152	2,836	12,739	4.3	99	77	17.0	73.6	515	3,224	6.3	91	13	2.3	14.3	61	25

== Awards and honors ==
NFL

- Super Bowl champion (XII)
- NFL Offensive Rookie of the Year (1977)
- PFWA All-Rookie Team (1977)
- First-team All-Pro (1981)
- 2× Second-team All-Pro (1982, 1983)
- 4× Pro Bowl (1978, 1981–1983)
- No. 77 on The Top 100: NFL's Greatest Players
- Dallas Cowboys Ring of Honor

College

- National champion (1976)
- Heisman Trophy (1976)
- Maxwell Award (1976)
- SN Player of the Year (1976)
- Walter Camp Award (1976)
- Chic Harley Award (1976)
- Unanimous All-American (1976)
- 2× First-team All-American (1973, 1975)
- Second-team All-American (1974)
- NCAA rushing yards leader (1976)
- NCAA rushing touchdowns leader (1976)
- NCAA scoring co-leader (1976)
- 4× First-team All-East (1973−1976)
- Second-team AP All-Time All-American (2025)
- Pittsburgh Panthers No. 33 retired

== Personal life ==
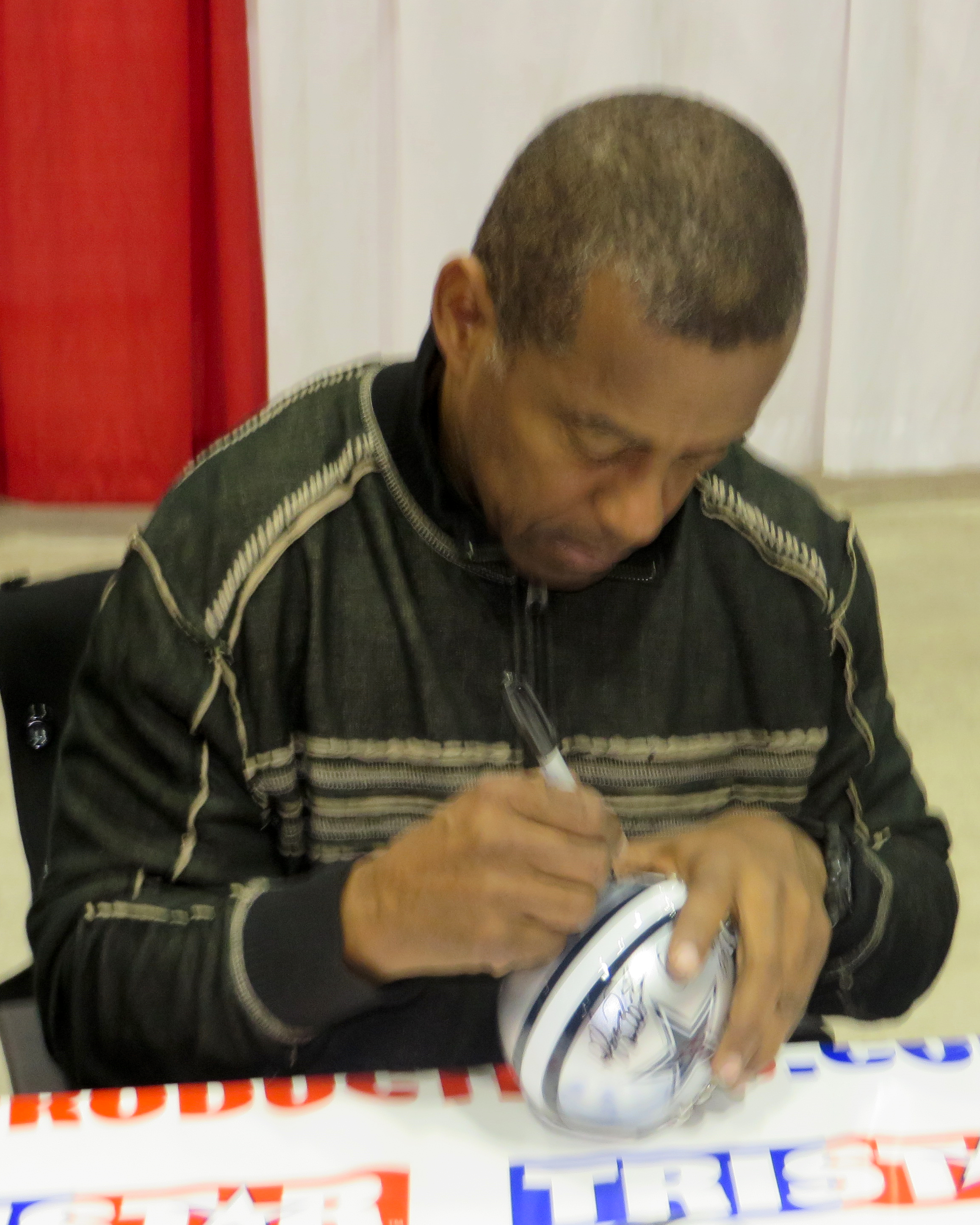
Dorsett signing autographs in Houston in January 2014

Dorsett has four children: Anthony, Jazmyn, Madison, and Mia (with current wife Janet). His son, Anthony, also played football at the University of Pittsburgh and played defensive back in the NFL from 1996 to 2003, making Super Bowl appearances with the Tennessee Titans (Super Bowl XXXIV) and Oakland Raiders (Super Bowl XXXVII). He is also the uncle of NFL Hall of Fame cornerback Ty Law, a three-time Super Bowl champion with the New England Patriots in the late '90s and early 2000s.

Dorsett hosts the Tony Dorsett Celebrity Golf Classic for McGuire Memorial. This event has raised nearly $5 million in support of McGuire Memorial's mission.

Dorsett has helped improve the health of current and former professional athletes through promoting awareness of sleep apnea. He teamed up with orthodontic technician David Gergen and the Pro Player Health Alliance to hold free public-awareness events in local communities across the United States. Dorsett has helped get over 150 former players treated for sleep apnea.

== Health issues ==
In November 2013, Dorsett announced he had signs of chronic traumatic encephalopathy (CTE), a brain disease found in many former football players, boxers, and hockey players. Dorsett specifically referred to memory loss and unexplained rage as major symptoms affecting him in retirement.

== See also ==
- List of NCAA Division I FBS players with at least 50 career rushing touchdowns
- List of NCAA major college football yearly rushing leaders
- List of NCAA major college football yearly scoring leaders
- Living former players diagnosed with or reporting symptoms of chronic traumatic encephalopathy
