= Robert Shaw (American football) =

American football player (born 1956)

No. 52
- Position: Center

Personal information
- Born: October 15, 1956 (age 70); Tuscaloosa, Alabama, U.S.
- Listed height: 6 ft 4 in (1.93 m)
- Listed weight: 245 lb (111 kg)

Career information
- High school: Marietta (GA) Wheeler
- College: Tennessee
- NFL draft: 1979: 1st round, 27th overall pick

Career history
- Dallas Cowboys (1979–1981)

Awards and highlights
- 2× First-team All-SEC (1977, 1978)

Career NFL statistics
- Games played: 33
- Games started: 6
- Stats at Pro Football Reference

Robert Leslie Shaw (born October 15, 1956) is an American former professional football player who was a center in the National Football League (NFL) for the Dallas Cowboys. He played college football at the University of Tennessee.

== Early life ==
Shaw attended Joseph Wheeler High School and played varsity football for three years, receiving All-American, state football lineman of the year and All-state honors in his senior season of 1975. He also practiced basketball and swimming.

He went on to play college football at Tennessee University, where he was a three-year starter at center, and earned second-team All-SEC honors in 1977 and 1978. Future Dallas Cowboys special teams coach Joe Avezzano, was his offensive coordinator.

As a senior, he was named one of the co-captains and received the team's Mickey O’Brien award. He also started in the East–West Shrine Game and the Senior Bowl.

== Professional career ==
Shaw was selected by the Dallas Cowboys in the first round (27th overall) of the 1979 NFL draft. This was only the second time the Cowboys used a first round pick on an offensive lineman. The first time was in the 1966 NFL draft when the team selected John Niland.

As a rookie in 1980, he started the season as a backup to John Fitzgerald at center and played mainly on special teams. After Fitzgerald injured his knee in the first half against the Washington Redskins, Shaw finished the game and played well enough to be named the starter for the next game against the Houston Oilers in Thanksgiving, while Fitzgerald recovered. He went on to become the starting center for the last five regular season games and three contests in the playoffs where he excelled.

Two games into his third season in 1981, he sprained his right knee against the Saint Louis Cardinals. He returned after sitting out three weeks, only to injure the same knee in the sixth game of the season against the San Francisco 49ers. He prepared and trained for a come back over 20 months, but was never able to pass the team's physical and subsequently retired.

Shaw was expected to anchor the Cowboys offensive line for 1980s, but his ongoing injuries and their effects brought an end to his promising career. He played in just 33 games over a 3-year career with the Cowboys. After Shaw's injury, Tom Rafferty was moved from guard and was named the starting center.

== Personal life ==
After the end of his football career, he went back to college and earned a degree in architectural design and management. He became a vice president, working directly under Bob Breunig in the SBC development company. In the late-1980s and early 1990s, he became President of Memphis Real Estate and Columbus Realty Holdings. Along with business partner Roger Staubach, his company helped begin the transformation of a blighted area west of the North Central Expressway and north of the Woodall-Rogers Freeway into what is now known as Uptown Dallas. The first apartment community, positioned between State and Thomas streets, would be the first of many developed using a tax increment financing program with the City of Dallas. Shaw was named to the Dallas Business Journal's "Top 40 Under 40". His real estate development prowess has continued, and - in 2014 - it was announced that Shaw and Staubach would work with restaurateur Phil Romano to develop an apartment community in Trinity Groves, a project expected to cost in excess of $100 million. In 2017, Dallas Cowboys owner Jerry Jones announced that the Shaw/Staubach team would enter into a joint venture to build a 17-story luxury high rise at The Star in Frisco, a mere walking distance from the Dallas Cowboys' world headquarters.
