= Pat Donovan =

American football player (born 1953)

No. 67
- Position: Offensive tackle

Personal information
- Born: July 1, 1953 (age 73); Helena, Montana, U.S.
- Listed height: 6 ft 5 in (1.96 m)
- Listed weight: 253 lb (115 kg)

Career information
- High school: Helena
- College: Stanford
- NFL draft: 1975: 4th round, 90th overall pick

Career history
- Dallas Cowboys (1975–1983)

Awards and highlights
- Super Bowl champion (XII); Second-team All-Pro (1981); 4× Pro Bowl (1978–1981); Consensus All-American (1974); First-team All-American (1973); 2× First-team All-Pac-8 (1973, 1974)

Career NFL statistics
- Games played: 129
- Games started: 103
- Stats at Pro Football Reference

Patrick Emery Donovan (born July 1, 1953) is an American former professional football player who was an offensive tackle for the Dallas Cowboys of the National Football League (NFL). He played college football for the Stanford Cardinal. Sports Illustrated named him the fourth greatest Montana athlete of the 20th century.

== Early life ==
Donovan is considered to be one of the greatest athletes in the history of the state of Montana. While attending Class A Helena Central High School as a freshman and sophomore, he lettered in football, basketball and track and field, winning the state shot put title as a sophomore.

After Helena Central closed, Donovan attended Class AA Helena High School, continuing to excel in track and field at the Class AA level, winning the shot put and discus competitions at the state meet in both his junior and senior seasons. He also was fast enough to anchor the school's 880-yard relay team to a state championship as a senior. He graduated as the holder of three school records in the shot put, discus and Javelin competitions.

Donovan also led Helena to the state championship basketball final as a junior and senior, losing to Kalispell in 1970 and winning against Billings West in 1971. He was named all tournament both years.

He went on to earn All-State honors on both offense and defense in football, was an All-State basketball player and won six first place medals at state track meets. In 1994, he was inducted into the Montana High School Association Hall of Fame and the National High School Hall of Fame.

== College career ==
Donovan received a football scholarship to play at Stanford University. He was named the right defensive end starter during his sophomore campaign and by the time he was a junior, he posted 109 tackles to lead his team and was named first-team All-American.

As a senior, he received Consensus All-American honors. He was inducted into the Stanford Athletic Hall of Fame and was also named to Stanford's All-Century football team.

== Professional career ==
Donovan was selected by the Dallas Cowboys in the fourth round of the 1975 NFL draft as a defensive end. He was one of 12 rookies who made the team that year - hence the "Dirty Dozen" nickname for the Cowboys 1975 draft, that helped the team reach Super Bowl X.

In 1975, the Cowboys needed help at offensive tackle and like defensive tackle Blaine Nye a few years before him, he was switched to the offensive line three days into training camp. As a rookie, he gained more weight and saw action at both left and right tackle.

After being a reserve during his first two seasons, he took over the right tackle job in 1977 when Rayfield Wright went down with an injury, helping the team win Super Bowl XII.

In 1978, he moved to the left side after Ralph Neely retired and Rayfield Wright returned from injury. Donovan became one of the top offensive tackles in the NFL during the late 1970s and early 1980s and together with Herb Scott formed one of the best left-side tandems in the league.

During his time with the Cowboys, center John Fitzgerald nicknamed the Cowboys offensive line as the "Four Irishmen and a Scott", when it was formed by Donovan, Fitzgerald, Jim Cooper, Tom Rafferty and Herb Scott.

That group helped pave the way for Tony Dorsett's Hall of Fame rushing career. In the 1982 season, he helped blocked on Dorsett's record 99-yard touchdown run against the Minnesota Vikings.

Donovan was a catalyst on the Cowboys offensive line and a four-time Pro Bowl offensive lineman from 1979 to 1982. He remains one of just five offensive tackles in club history to make at least four Pro Bowls, joining Rayfield Wright (six), Flozell Adams (five), Erik Williams (four) and Tyron Smith (four).

He did not suffer any major injuries during his entire career, but at the end of the 1983 season, because of the accumulation of wear and tear, he ended up needing surgery to repair both shoulders and decided to retire. Donovan never missed a game in 9 seasons, played in 20 playoff contests, including six NFC Championships and three Super Bowls, earning a title ring in Super Bowl XII against the Denver Broncos.
