= 1979 Denver Broncos season =

American football team season

- Owner: Gerald Phipps
- General manager: Fred Gehrke
- Head coach: Red Miller
- Home stadium: Mile High Stadium

Results
- Record: 10–6
- Division place: 2nd AFC West
- Playoffs: Lost Wild Card Playoffs (at Oilers) 7–13

The 1979 Denver Broncos season was the team's 20th year in professional football and its 10th with the National Football League (NFL). Led by third-year head coach Red Miller, the Broncos were 10–6, second in the AFC West, and made the postseason a third consecutive year. In the Wild Card round the Broncos lost to the Houston Oilers 13–7.

== Offseason ==
=== NFL draft ===
1979 Denver Broncos draft
Round	Pick	Player	Position	College	Notes
1	22	Kelvin Clark	Tackle	Nebraska	
3	77	Bruce Radford	NT	Grambling State	
4	105	Charles Jefferson	DB	McNeese State	
5	132	Rick Leach	QB	Michigan	
6	148	Jeff McIntyre	LB	Arizona State	
7	188	Luke Prestridge *	P	Baylor	
9	242	Charlie Taylor	WR	Rice	
11	297	Zach Dixon	RB	Temple	
12	325	Dave Jacobs	K	Syracuse	
Made roster † Pro Football Hall of Fame * Made at least one Pro Bowl during career

=== Undrafted free agents ===
1979 undrafted free agents of note
Player	Position	College
Wylie Turner	Defensive Back	Angelo State

== Personnel ==
=== Staff / Coaches ===
1979 Denver Broncos staff
Front office: Chairman of the Board – Gerald Phipps; President – Allan Phipps; Vice President/General Manager – Fred Gehrke; Director of Player Personnel – Carroll Hardy; Pro Scouting – John Beake; Head coaches: Head Coach – Red Miller; Offensive coaches: Quarterbacks – Babe Parilli; Offensive Backfield – Paul Roach; Wide Receivers – Fran Polsfoot; Offensive Line – Whitey Dovell	Defensive coaches: Defensive Coordinator – Joe Collier; Defensive Line – Stan Jones; Linebackers – Bob Zeman; Defensive Backs – Richie McCabe; Special teams coaches: Special Teams – Marv Braden; Strength and conditioning: N/A - Vacant

=== Roster ===
1979 Denver Broncos roster
Quarterbacks (QB): 7 Craig Morton; 12 Craig Penrose; 14 Norris Weese; Running backs (RB): 24 Otis Armstrong; 35 Larry Canada; 30 Jim Jensen; 32 Jon Keyworth; 46 Dave Preston; Wide receivers (WR): 84 Vince Kinney; 25 Haven Moses; 80 Rick Upchurch; 81 Steve Watson; Tight ends (TE): 85 Ron Egloff; 88 Riley Odoms	Offensive linemen (OL): 55 Ken Brown C; 64 Billy Bryan C; 73 Kelvin Clark T; 62 Tom Glassic G; 65 Glenn Hyde G/T; 60 Paul Howard G; 71 Claudie Minor T; 70 Dave Studdard T; Defensive linemen (DL): 68 Rubin Carter NT; 79 Barney Chavous DE; 63 John Grant DE; 72 Don Latimer NT; 66 Brison Manor DE; 78 Bruce Radford DE	Linebackers (LB): 56 Larry Evans OLB; 53 Randy Gradishar ILB; 57 Tom Jackson OLB; 58 Rob Nairne ILB; 59 Joe Rizzo ILB; 50 Jim Ryan OLB; 51 Bob Swenson OLB; Defensive backs (DB): 47 George Atkinson SS; 43 Steve Foley CB; 29 Bernard Jackson FS; 23 Chris Pane CB; 36 Bill Thompson SS; 40 Charlie West FS; 20 Louis Wright CB; Special teams (ST): 11 Luke Prestridge P; 19 Fred Steinfort K; 15 Jim Turner K	Practice squad: None - Vacant; Reserve: 82 Jack Dolbin WR (IR); -- Cyril McFall K (IR); 27 Maurice Harvey S (IR); -- Richard Keys C (IR); 41 Rob Lytle RB (IR); -- Tony Stephens WR (IR); -- Keith Uperesa G (IR); Rookies in italics 46 active, 7 reserve, 0 practice squad

== Regular season ==
=== Schedule ===
Week	Date	Opponent	Result	Record	Venue	Attendance
1	September 2	Cincinnati Bengals	**W** 10–0	1–0	Mile High Stadium	74,788
2	September 6	Los Angeles Rams	**L** 9–13	1–1	Mile High Stadium	74,884
3	September 16	at Atlanta Falcons	**W** 20–17 (OT)	2–1	Atlanta–Fulton County Stadium	57,677
4	September 23	**Seattle Seahawks**	**W** 37–34	3–1	Mile High Stadium	74,879
5	September 30	at **Oakland Raiders**	**L** 3–27	3–2	Oakland–Alameda County Coliseum	52,632
6	October 7	**San Diego Chargers**	**W** 7–0	4–2	Mile High Stadium	74,997
7	October 14	at **Kansas City Chiefs**	**W** 24–10	5–2	Arrowhead Stadium	74,292
8	October 22	at Pittsburgh Steelers	**L** 7–42	5–3	Three Rivers Stadium	49,699
9	October 28	**Kansas City Chiefs**	**W** 20–3	6–3	Mile High Stadium	74,908
10	November 4	New Orleans Saints	**W** 10–3	7–3	Mile High Stadium	74,482
11	November 11	New England Patriots	**W** 45–10	8–3	Mile High Stadium	74,379
12	November 18	at San Francisco 49ers	**W** 38–28	9–3	Candlestick Park	42,910
13	November 25	**Oakland Raiders**	**L** 10–14	9–4	Mile High Stadium	74,186
14	December 2	at Buffalo Bills	**W** 19–16	10–4	Rich Stadium	37,886
15	December 8	at **Seattle Seahawks**	**L** 23–28	10–5	Kingdome	60,038
16	December 17	at **San Diego Chargers**	**L** 7–17	10–6	San Diego Stadium	51,906
Note: Intra-division opponents are in **bold** text.

=== Game summaries ===
==== Week 1 ====
Team	1	2	3	4	Total
Bengals	0	0	0	0	0
• Broncos	0	3	7	0	10

- Date: September
- Location: Mile High Stadium, Denver, Colorado
- Game start: 2:00 p.m.
- Game weather: 69 °F (21 °C), wind 6 mph (10 km/h)
- Referee: Dick Jorgensen

Scoring summary
2	DEN	Jim Turner 37 yard field goal	Broncos 3–0
3	DEN	Dave Preston 6 yard pass from Norris Weese (Jim Turner kick)	Broncos 10–0

==== Week 5 ====
- Date: September 30, 1979
- Network: NBC
- Announcers: Dick Enberg and Merlin Olsen

All-Pro Dave Casper returns to Oakland's starting lineup after four weeks as a second stringer, caught a 28-yard touchdown pass from Ken Stabler to open the scoring as the Oakland Raiders upset the Denver Broncos, and ending their three-game losing streak. The Raiders used a two tight end formation throughout most of this game. Casper who reported late to training camp following a contract dispute caught four passes for 92 yards. Casper's final catch of the day was a 42-yard bomb from Stabler which set up one of two Jim Breech field goals in the final period. The Raiders drove 81 yards for their first touchdown late in the first quarter. Denver's Jim Turner made the score 7-3 late in the second period with a 19-yard field goal, but Larry Brunson's 50-yard kickoff return put the Raiders in scoring position and Mark Van Eeghen ran one yard for a touchdown 16 seconds before halftime. The Raiders, 2-3 used a four-man defensive line. It was a switch from their usual three-man front, and Ray Guy of Oakland contribute to the offensive frustrations of 3-2 Denver with some great punting. Guy's last punt pinned the Broncos near their goal line and linebacker Monte Johnson fell on the fumble in the end zone late in the game for the Raiders' final touchdown.

==== Week 12 (Sunday, November 18, 1979): at San Francisco 49ers ====
Week 12: Denver Broncos at San Francisco 49ers – Game summary

Quarter	1	2	3	4	Total
**Broncos** (9–3)	3	14	21	0	**38**
49ers (1–11)	0	21	0	7	**28**

at Candlestick Park • San Francisco, California

- Date: November 18
- Game time: 2:00 p.m. MST
- Game attendance: 42,910
- Referee: Gene Barth
- TV announcers (NBC): Sam Nover (play–by–play) and Bob Trumpy (color commentator)

Team	Category	Player	Statistics
DEN	Passing		
DEN	Rushing		
DEN	Receiving		
SF	Passing		
SF	Rushing		
SF	Receiving		

Scoring summary

Quarter	Time	Drive			Team	Scoring information	Score	
Quarter	Time	Plays	Yards	TOP	Team	Scoring information	DEN	SF
"TOP" = time of possession. For other American football terms, see Glossary of American football.							38	28

- Point spread: Broncos —9
- Over/under: 39.0 **(over)**
- Time of game:

Broncos	Game statistics	49ers
22	First downs	18
28–144	Rushes–yards	34–74
225	Passing yards	166
19–35–1	Passes	23–41–0
0–0	Sacked–yards	0–0
225	Net passing yards	166
369	Total yards	240
109	Return yards	239
6–38.5	Punts	6–45.2
1–1	Fumbles–lost	4–2
11–90	Penalties–yards	9–75
	Time of possession	

Individual stats

=== Standings ===
AFC West
	W	L	T	PCT	DIV	CONF	PF	PA	STK
^{(1)} San Diego Chargers	12	4	0	.750	6–2	9–3	411	246	W2
^{(5)} Denver Broncos	10	6	0	.625	4–4	7–5	289	262	L2
Seattle Seahawks	9	7	0	.563	3–5	6–6	378	372	W2
Oakland Raiders	9	7	0	.563	3–5	5–7	365	337	L1
Kansas City Chiefs	7	9	0	.438	4–4	7–7	238	262	L1

== Playoffs ==
Round	Date	Opponent (seed)	Result	Record	Venue	Attendance
Wild Card	December 23	at Houston Oilers (4)	L 7–13	0–1	Astrodome	48,776

Game summary

Quarter	1	2	3	4	Total
Broncos	7	0	0	0	7
Oilers	3	7	0	3	13

at Astrodome, Houston, Texas

- Game time: 3:00 p.m. CST
- Game attendance: 48,776
- Referee: Gene Barth
- TV announcers (NBC): Charlie Jones and Len Dawson

Game information
- Scoring
  - HOU – field goal Fritsch 31 HOU 3–0
  - DEN – Preston 7 pass from Morton (Turner kick) DEN 7–3
  - HOU – Campbell 3 run (Fritsch kick) HOU 10–7
  - HOU – field goal Fritsch 20 HOU 13–7

The Oilers managed to shut down the Broncos offense for most of the game en route to a 13–7 win, holding the Broncos to 216 yards and recording six sacks.

After Toni Fritsch kicked a 31-yard field goal on Houston's first drive, Denver marched 80 yards in 13 plays to score on quarterback Craig Morton's 7-yard touchdown pass to running back Dave Preston. From that point on, the Oilers controlled the rest of the game. With less than 3 minutes left in the first half, Houston advanced 74 yards to score on running back Earl Campbell's 3-yard touchdown run. Although Campbell and starting quarterback Dan Pastorini both missed the second half with injuries, the Oilers defense continued to dominate. In the fourth quarter, a 15-yard interception return by linebacker Gregg Bingham set up Fritsch's 20-yard field goal with 4:18 left in regulation.
