= 1980 Denver Broncos season =

American football team season

- Owner: Gerald Phipps
- General manager: Fred Gehrke
- Head coach: Red Miller
- Home stadium: Mile High Stadium

Results
- Record: 8–8
- Division place: 4th AFC West
- Playoffs: Did not qualify

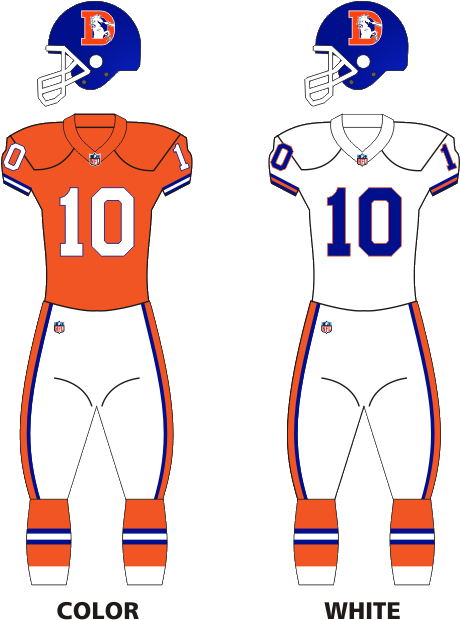

The 1980 Denver Broncos season was the team's 21st year in professional football and its 11th with the National Football League (NFL). Led by fourth-year head coach Red Miller the Broncos were 8–8, tied for third in the AFC West (fourth via tiebreaker), and missed the playoffs for the first time in four seasons.

It was Miller's final season; ownership changed in February 1981 and front office changes were made in March.

== Offseason ==
=== NFL draft ===
1980 Denver Broncos draft
Round	Pick	Player	Position	College	Notes
2	42	Rulon Jones *	Defensive end	Utah State	
3	74	Larry Carter	Defensive back	Kentucky	
4	107	Rick Parros	Running back	Utah State	
5	131	Mike Harden	Safety	Michigan	
5	136	Laval Short	Defensive tackle	Colorado	
6	157	Keith Bishop *	Guard	Baylor	
7	184	John Havekost	Guard	Nebraska	
8	197	Don Coleman	Wide receiver	Oregon	
9	243	Greg Bracelin	Linebacker	California	
10	270	Virgil Seay	Wide receiver	Troy State	
11	297	Phil Farris	Wide receiver	North Carolina	
Made roster † Pro Football Hall of Fame * Made at least one Pro Bowl during career

=== Undrafted free agents ===
1980 undrafted free agents of note
Player	Position	College
Dennis Dunn	Safety	Yale
Tom Ebner	Safety	Houston
Tom Formica	Tackle	Colorado State
Tim Gerhart	Linebacker	Lafayette
Ivory Joe Hunter	Defensive back	Florida State
Daryle Tyson	Cornerback	Florida A&M
Scott Wade	Linebacker	South Carolina
Billy Washington	Wide receiver	East Carolina

== Personnel ==
=== Staff ===
1980 Denver Broncos staff
Front office: Chairman of the Board – Gerald Phipps; President – Allan Phipps; Vice President/General Manager – Fred Gehrke; Director of player personnel – Carroll Hardy; Director of Pro Personnel – John Beake; Head coaches: Head coach – Red Miller; Offensive coaches: Offensive Coordinator – Rod Dowhower; Offensive Backfield – Paul Roach; Wide Receivers – Fran Polsfoot; Offensive Line – Whitey Dovell	Defensive coaches: Defensive Coordinator – Joe Collier; Defensive Line – Stan Jones; Linebackers – Bob Zeman; Defensive Backs – Richie McCabe; Special teams coaches: Special Teams – Marv Braden

=== Roster ===
1980 Denver Broncos roster
Quarterbacks (QB): 16 Jeff Knapple; 7 Craig Morton; 17 Matt Robinson; Running backs (RB): 30 Jim Jensen; 32 Jon Keyworth; 41 Rob Lytle; 46 Dave Preston; Wide receivers (WR): 82 Larry Brunson; 86 Emery Moorehead; 25 Haven Moses; 80 Rick Upchurch; 81 Steve Watson; Tight ends (TE): 85 Ron Egloff; 88 Riley Odoms; 87 James Wright	Offensive linemen (OL): 54 Keith Bishop G/C; 64 Billy Bryan C; 73 Kelvin Clark T; 62 Tom Glassic G; 65 Glenn Hyde G; 60 Paul Howard G; 71 Claudie Minor T; 70 Dave Studdard T; 61 Arland Thompson G; Defensive linemen (DL): 77 Greg Boyd DE; 68 Rubin Carter NT; 79 Barney Chavous DE; 75 Rulon Jones DE; 72 Don Latimer NT; 66 Brison Manor DE; 63 Laval Short NT	Linebackers (LB): 52 Greg Bracelin OLB; 56 Larry Evans ILB; 53 Randy Gradishar ILB; 57 Tom Jackson OLB; 58 Rob Nairne OLB; 50 Jim Ryan ILB; Defensive backs (DB): 43 Steve Foley FS/CB; 31 Mike Harden SS; 27 Maurice Harvey FS; 22 Aaron Kyle CB; 36 Bill Thompson SS; 20 Louis Wright CB; Special teams (ST): 11 Luke Prestridge P; 19 Fred Steinfort K	Practice squad: None - Vacant; Reserve: 24 Otis Armstrong RB (IR); 35 Larry Canada RB (IR); -- Tom Davis C (IR); -- John Havekost G (IR); -- Rick Parros RB (IR); 83 Golden Richards WR (IR); 59 Joe Rizzo LB (IR); 45 Perry Smith CB (IR); 51 Bob Swenson LB (IR); Rookies in italics 45 active, 9 reserve, 0 practice squad

== Preseason ==
=== Schedule ===
Week	Date	Opponent	Result	Record	Venue	Attendance
1	August 9	Cincinnati Bengals	W 17–6	1–0	Mile High Stadium	67,532
2	August 16	at New York Giants	L 6–9	1–1	Giants Stadium	30,904
3	August 23	Los Angeles Rams	L 13–26	1–2	Mile High Stadium	73,946
4	August 30	at Green Bay Packers	W 38–0	2–2	Lambeau Field	53,060

== Regular season ==
=== Schedule ===
Week	Date	Opponent	Result	Record	Venue	Attendance
1	September 7	at Philadelphia Eagles	**L** 6–27	0–1	Veterans Stadium	70,307
2	September 14	Dallas Cowboys	**W** 41–20	1–1	Mile High Stadium	74,919
3	September 21	**San Diego Chargers**	**L** 13–30	1–2	Mile High Stadium	74,970
4	September 29	at New England Patriots	**L** 14–23	1–3	Schaefer Stadium	60,153
5	October 5	at Cleveland Browns	**W** 19–16	2–3	Municipal Stadium	81,065
6	October 13	Washington Redskins	**W** 20–17	3–3	Mile High Stadium	74,657
7	October 19	**Kansas City Chiefs**	**L** 17–23	3–4	Mile High Stadium	74,459
8	October 26	at New York Giants	**W** 14–9	4–4	Giants Stadium	67,598
9	November 2	Houston Oilers	**L** 16–20	4–5	Mile High Stadium	74,717
10	November 9	at **San Diego Chargers**	**W** 20–13	5–5	San Diego Stadium	51,435
11	November 16	New York Jets	**W** 31–24	6–5	Mile High Stadium	72,114
12	November 23	**Seattle Seahawks**	**W** 36–20	7–5	Mile High Stadium	73,274
13	December 1	at **Oakland Raiders**	**L** 3–9	7–6	Oakland–Alameda County Coliseum	51,593
14	December 7	at **Kansas City Chiefs**	**L** 14–31	7–7	Arrowhead Stadium	40,237
15	December 14	**Oakland Raiders**	**L** 21–24	7–8	Mile High Stadium	73,974
16	December 21	at **Seattle Seahawks**	**W** 25–17	8–8	Kingdome	51,853
Note: Intra-division opponents are in **bold** text.

=== Game summaries ===
==== Week 1 (Sunday, September 7, 1980): at Philadelphia Eagles ====
Week 1: Denver Broncos at Philadelphia Eagles – Game summary

Quarter	1	2	3	4	Total
Broncos	0	0	6	0	**6**
**Eagles**	7	13	0	7	**27**

at Veterans Stadium • Philadelphia, Pennsylvania

- Date: September 7
- Game time: 2:00 p.m. MDT
- Game attendance: 70,307
- Referee: Chuck Heberling
- TV announcers (NBC): Don Criqui (play–by–play) and John Brodie (color commentator)

Team	Category	Player	Statistics
DEN	Passing		
DEN	Rushing		
DEN	Receiving		
PHI	Passing		
PHI	Rushing		
PHI	Receiving		

Scoring summary

Quarter	Time	Drive			Team	Scoring information	Score	
Quarter	Time	Plays	Yards	TOP	Team	Scoring information	DEN	PHI
1	5:43	5	87		Eagles	Carmichael 56-yard touchdown reception from Jaworski, Franklin kick good	0	7
2	8:40	10	73		Eagles	17-yard field goal by Franklin	0	10
2	1:45	7	80		Eagles	Fitzkee 16-yard touchdown reception from Jaworski, Franklin kick good	0	17
2	0:31	5	15		Eagles	32-yard field goal by Franklin	0	20
3	4:06	7	15		Broncos	44-yard field goal by Steinfort	3	20
3	2:21	4	3		Broncos	43-yard field goal by Steinfort	6	20
4	14:55	5	80		Eagles	Spagnola 11-yard touchdown reception from Jaworski, Franklin kick good	6	27
"TOP" = time of possession. For other American football terms, see Glossary of American football.							6	27

- Point spread:
- Over/under:
- Time of game: 3 hours, 13 minutes

Broncos	Game statistics	Eagles
	First downs	
	Rushes–yards	
	Passing yards	
	Passes	
	Sacked–yards	
	Net passing yards	
	Total yards	
	Return yards	
	Punts	
	Fumbles–lost	
	Penalties–yards	
	Time of possession	

Individual stats

==== Week 2 (Sunday, September 14, 1980): vs. Dallas Cowboys ====
Week 2: Dallas Cowboys at Denver Broncos – Game summary

Quarter	1	2	3	4	Total
Cowboys	0	10	3	7	**20**
**Broncos**	7	17	14	3	**41**

at Mile High Stadium • Denver, Colorado

- Date: September 14
- Game time: 2:00 p.m. MDT
- Game attendance: 74,919
- Referee: Jerry Markbreit
- TV announcers (CBS): Lindsey Nelson (play–by–play) and Sonny Jurgensen (color commentator)

Team	Category	Player	Statistics
DAL	Passing		
DAL	Rushing		
DAL	Receiving		
DEN	Passing		
DEN	Rushing		
DEN	Receiving		

Scoring summary

Quarter	Time	Drive			Team	Scoring information	Score	
Quarter	Time	Plays	Yards	TOP	Team	Scoring information	DAL	DEN
1					Broncos	Robinson 1-yard touchdown run, Steinfort kick good	0	7
2					Broncos	46-yard field goal by Steinfort	0	10
2					Broncos	Robinson 3-yard touchdown run, Steinfort kick good	0	17
2					Cowboys	Hill 31-yard touchdown reception from White, Septién kick good	7	17
2		—	—	—	Broncos	Fumble recovery returned 32 yards for touchdown by Thompson, Steinfort kick good	7	24
2					Cowboys	30-yard field goal by Septién	10	24
3					Cowboys	36-yard field goal by Septién	13	24
3					Broncos	Armstrong 3-yard touchdown run, Steinfort kick good	13	31
3					Broncos	Jensen 4-yard touchdown run, Steinfort kick good	13	38
4					Cowboys	Hill 22-yard touchdown reception from White, Septién kick good	20	38
4					Broncos	55-yard field goal by Steinfort	20	41
"TOP" = time of possession. For other American football terms, see Glossary of American football.							20	41

- Point spread:
- Over/under:
- Time of game:

Cowboys	Game statistics	Broncos
	First downs	
	Rushes–yards	
	Passing yards	
	Passes	
	Sacked–yards	
	Net passing yards	
	Total yards	
	Return yards	
	Punts	
	Fumbles–lost	
	Penalties–yards	
	Time of possession	

Individual stats

==== Week 3 (Sunday, September 21, 1980): vs. San Diego Chargers ====
Week 3: San Diego Chargers at Denver Broncos – Game summary

Quarter	1	2	3	4	Total
**Chargers**	3	24	3	0	**30**
Broncos	3	3	7	0	**13**

at Mile High Stadium • Denver, Colorado

- Date: September 21
- Game time: 2:00 p.m. MDT
- Game attendance: 74,970
- Referee: Fred Silva
- TV announcers (NBC): Dick Enberg (play–by–play) and Merlin Olsen (color commentator)

Team	Category	Player	Statistics
SD	Passing		
SD	Rushing		
SD	Receiving		
DEN	Passing		
DEN	Rushing		
DEN	Receiving		

Scoring summary

Quarter	Time	Drive			Team	Scoring information	Score	
Quarter	Time	Plays	Yards	TOP	Team	Scoring information	SD	DEN
1					Chargers	53-yard field goal by Benirschke	3	0
1					Broncos	51-yard field goal by Steinfort	3	3
2					Chargers	Cappelletti 1-yard touchdown run, Benirschke kick good	10	3
2					Broncos	46-yard field goal by Steinfort	10	6
2					Chargers	Joiner 22-yard touchdown reception from Fouts, Benirschke kick good	17	6
2		—	—	—	Chargers	Interception returned 68 yards for touchdown by Edwards, Benirschke kick good	24	6
2					Chargers	32-yard field goal by Benirschke	27	6
3					Chargers	42-yard field goal by Benirschke	30	6
3					Broncos	Moses 15-yard touchdown reception from Morton, Steinfort kick good	30	13
"TOP" = time of possession. For other American football terms, see Glossary of American football.							30	13

- Point spread:
- Over/under:
- Time of game:

Chargers	Game statistics	Broncos
	First downs	
	Rushes–yards	
	Passing yards	
	Passes	
	Sacked–yards	
	Net passing yards	
	Total yards	
	Return yards	
	Punts	
	Fumbles–lost	
	Penalties–yards	
	Time of possession	

Individual stats

==== Week 4 (Monday, September 29, 1980): at New England Patriots ====
Week 4: Denver Broncos at New England Patriots – Game summary

Quarter	1	2	3	4	Total
Broncos	7	0	7	0	**14**
**Patriots**	3	7	7	6	**23**

at Schaefer Stadium • Foxborough, Massachusetts

- Date: September 29
- Game time: 7:00 p.m. MDT
- Game attendance: 60,153
- Referee: Red Cashion
- TV announcers (ABC): Frank Gifford (play–by–play), Howard Cosell (color commentator) and Don Meredith (color commentator)

Team	Category	Player	Statistics
DEN	Passing		
DEN	Rushing		
DEN	Receiving		
NE	Passing		
NE	Rushing		
NE	Receiving		

Scoring summary

Quarter	Time	Drive			Team	Scoring information	Score	
Quarter	Time	Plays	Yards	TOP	Team	Scoring information	DEN	NE
1	7:39	5	55		Broncos	Moses 17-yard touchdown reception from Robinson, Steinfort kick good	7	0
1	1:27	10	57		Patriots	26-yard field goal by Smith	7	3
2	10:25	7	66		Patriots	Ferguson 2-yard touchdown run, Smith kick good	7	10
3	11:24	5	37		Broncos	Armstrong 8-yard touchdown run, Steinfort kick good	14	10
3	8:06	7	78		Patriots	Morgan 45-yard touchdown reception from Grogan, Smith kick good	14	17
4	9:38	16	78		Patriots	19-yard field goal by Smith	14	20
4	2:12	9	45		Patriots	36-yard field goal by Smith	14	23
"TOP" = time of possession. For other American football terms, see Glossary of American football.							14	23

- Point spread:
- Over/under:
- Time of game: 2 hours, 54 minutes

Broncos	Game statistics	Patriots
	First downs	
	Rushes–yards	
	Passing yards	
	Passes	
	Sacked–yards	
	Net passing yards	
	Total yards	
	Return yards	
	Punts	
	Fumbles–lost	
	Penalties–yards	
	Time of possession	

Individual stats

==== Week 5 (Sunday, October 5, 1980): at Cleveland Browns ====
Week 5: Denver Broncos at Cleveland Browns – Game summary

Quarter	1	2	3	4	Total
**Broncos**	3	10	3	3	**19**
Browns	3	10	3	0	**16**

at Municipal Stadium • Cleveland, Ohio

- Date: October 5
- Game time: 11:00 a.m. MDT
- Game attendance: 81,065
- Referee: Jerry Seeman
- TV announcers (NBC): Sam Nover (play–by–play) and Bob Trumpy (color commentator)

Team	Category	Player	Statistics
DEN	Passing		
DEN	Rushing		
DEN	Receiving		
CLE	Passing		
CLE	Rushing		
CLE	Receiving		

Scoring summary

Quarter	Time	Drive			Team	Scoring information	Score	
Quarter	Time	Plays	Yards	TOP	Team	Scoring information	DEN	CLE
1					Broncos	18-yard field goal by Steinfort	3	0
1					Browns	24-yard field goal by Cockroft	3	3
2					Broncos	47-yard field goal by Steinfort	6	3
2					Browns	Rucker 40-yard touchdown reception from Sipe, Cockroft kick good	6	10
2		—	—	—	Broncos	Interception returned 93 yards for touchdown by Gradishar, Steinfort kick good	13	10
2					Browns	45-yard field goal by Cockroft	13	13
3					Broncos	41-yard field goal by Steinfort	16	13
3					Browns	40-yard field goal by Cockroft	16	16
4					Broncos	19-yard field goal by Steinfort	19	16
"TOP" = time of possession. For other American football terms, see Glossary of American football.							19	16

- Point spread:
- Over/under:
- Time of game:

Broncos	Game statistics	Browns
	First downs	
	Rushes–yards	
	Passing yards	
	Passes	
	Sacked–yards	
	Net passing yards	
	Total yards	
	Return yards	
	Punts	
	Fumbles–lost	
	Penalties–yards	
	Time of possession	

Individual stats

==== Week 6 (Monday, October 13, 1980): vs. Washington Redskins ====
Week 6: Washington Redskins at Denver Broncos – Game summary

Quarter	1	2	3	4	Total
Redskins	3	0	7	7	**17**
**Broncos**	7	3	3	7	**20**

at Mile High Stadium • Denver, Colorado

- Date: October 13
- Game time: 7:00 p.m. MDT
- Game attendance: 74,657
- Referee: Fred Wyant
- TV announcers (ABC): Frank Gifford (play–by–play), Howard Cosell (color commentator) and Don Meredith (color commentator)

Team	Category	Player	Statistics
WAS	Passing		
WAS	Rushing		
WAS	Receiving		
DEN	Passing		
DEN	Rushing		
DEN	Receiving		

Scoring summary

Quarter	Time	Drive			Team	Scoring information	Score	
Quarter	Time	Plays	Yards	TOP	Team	Scoring information	WAS	DEN
1					Broncos	Armstrong 8-yard touchdown run, Steinfort kick good	0	7
1					Redskins	23-yard field goal by Moseley	3	7
2					Broncos	57-yard field goal by Steinfort	3	10
3					Redskins	Jackson 55-yard touchdown run, Moseley kick good	10	10
3					Broncos	23-yard field goal by Steinfort	10	13
4					Redskins	Monk 1-yard touchdown reception from Theismann, Moseley kick good	17	13
4					Broncos	Upchurch 32-yard touchdown reception from Morton, Steinfort kick good	17	20
"TOP" = time of possession. For other American football terms, see Glossary of American football.							17	20

- Point spread:
- Over/under:
- Time of game:

Redskins	Game statistics	Broncos
	First downs	
	Rushes–yards	
	Passing yards	
	Passes	
	Sacked–yards	
	Net passing yards	
	Total yards	
	Return yards	
	Punts	
	Fumbles–lost	
	Penalties–yards	
	Time of possession	

Individual stats

==== Week 7 (Sunday, October 19, 1980): vs. Kansas City Chiefs ====
Week 7: Kansas City Chiefs at Denver Broncos – Game summary

Quarter	1	2	3	4	Total
**Chiefs**	3	10	7	3	**23**
Broncos	7	7	3	0	**17**

at Mile High Stadium • Denver, Colorado

- Date: October 19
- Game time: 12:00 p.m. MDT
- Game attendance: 74,459
- Referee: Chuck Heberling

Team	Category	Player	Statistics
KC	Passing		
KC	Rushing		
KC	Receiving		
DEN	Passing		
DEN	Rushing		
DEN	Receiving		

Scoring summary

Quarter	Time	Drive			Team	Scoring information	Score	
Quarter	Time	Plays	Yards	TOP	Team	Scoring information	KC	DEN
1					Chiefs	37-yard field goal by Lowery	3	0
1					Broncos	Upchurch 14-yard touchdown reception from Morton, Steinfort kick good	3	7
2					Broncos	Odoms 6-yard touchdown reception from Morton, Steinfort kick good	3	14
2					Chiefs	39-yard field goal by Lowery	6	14
2					Chiefs	Dixon 26-yard touchdown reception from Fuller, Lowery kick good	13	14
3					Broncos	41-yard field goal by Steinfort	13	17
3					Chiefs	Marshall 46-yard touchdown reception from Fuller, Lowery kick good	20	17
4					Chiefs	34-yard field goal by Lowery	23	17
"TOP" = time of possession. For other American football terms, see Glossary of American football.							23	17

- Point spread:
- Over/under:
- Time of game:

Chiefs	Game statistics	Broncos
	First downs	
	Rushes–yards	
	Passing yards	
	Passes	
	Sacked–yards	
	Net passing yards	
	Total yards	
	Return yards	
	Punts	
	Fumbles–lost	
	Penalties–yards	
	Time of possession	

Individual stats

==== Week 8 (Sunday, October 26, 1980): at New York Giants ====
Week 8: Denver Broncos at New York Giants – Game summary

Quarter	1	2	3	4	Total
**Broncos**	0	7	7	0	**14**
Giants	3	6	0	0	**9**

at Giants Stadium • East Rutherford, New Jersey

- Date: October 26
- Game time: 11:00 a.m. MST
- Game attendance: 67,598
- Referee: Gordon McCarter
- TV announcers (NBC): Marv Albert (play–by–play) and Gene Washington (color commentator)

Team	Category	Player	Statistics
DEN	Passing		
DEN	Rushing		
DEN	Receiving		
NYG	Passing		
NYG	Rushing		
NYG	Receiving		

Scoring summary

Quarter	Time	Drive			Team	Scoring information	Score	
Quarter	Time	Plays	Yards	TOP	Team	Scoring information	DEN	NYG
1					Giants	28-yard field goal by Danelo	0	3
2					Broncos	Jensen 1-yard touchdown run, Steinfort kick good	7	3
2					Giants	28-yard field goal by Danelo	7	6
2					Giants	45-yard field goal by Danelo	7	9
3					Broncos	Armstrong 2-yard touchdown run, Steinfort kick good	14	9
"TOP" = time of possession. For other American football terms, see Glossary of American football.							14	9

- Point spread:
- Over/under:
- Time of game:

Broncos	Game statistics	Giants
	First downs	
	Rushes–yards	
	Passing yards	
	Passes	
	Sacked–yards	
	Net passing yards	
	Total yards	
	Return yards	
	Punts	
	Fumbles–lost	
	Penalties–yards	
	Time of possession	

Individual stats

==== Week 9 (Sunday, November 2, 1980): vs. Houston Oilers ====
Week 9: Houston Oilers at Denver Broncos – Game summary

Quarter	1	2	3	4	Total
**Oilers**	0	7	6	7	**20**
Broncos	6	3	0	7	**16**

at Mile High Stadium • Denver, Colorado

- Date: November 2
- Game time: 2:00 p.m. MST
- Game attendance: 74,717
- Referee: Gene Barth
- TV announcers (NBC): Dick Enberg (play–by–play) and Merlin Olsen (color commentator)

Team	Category	Player	Statistics
HOU	Passing		
HOU	Rushing		
HOU	Receiving		
DEN	Passing		
DEN	Rushing		
DEN	Receiving		

Scoring summary

Quarter	Time	Drive			Team	Scoring information	Score	
Quarter	Time	Plays	Yards	TOP	Team	Scoring information	HOU	DEN
1					Broncos	45-yard field goal by Steinfort	0	3
1					Broncos	20-yard field goal by Steinfort	0	6
2					Oilers	Campbell 1-yard touchdown run, Fritsch kick good	7	6
2					Broncos	28-yard field goal by Steinfort	7	9
3					Oilers	Campbell 9-yard touchdown run, Fritsch kick no good	13	9
4					Oilers	Carpenter 2-yard touchdown run, Fritsch kick good	20	9
4					Broncos	Jensen 8-yard touchdown reception from Morton, Steinfort kick good	20	16
"TOP" = time of possession. For other American football terms, see Glossary of American football.							20	16

- Point spread:
- Over/under:
- Time of game:

Oilers	Game statistics	Broncos
	First downs	
	Rushes–yards	
	Passing yards	
	Passes	
	Sacked–yards	
	Net passing yards	
	Total yards	
	Return yards	
	Punts	
	Fumbles–lost	
	Penalties–yards	
	Time of possession	

Individual stats

==== Week 10 (Sunday, November 9, 1980): at San Diego Chargers ====
Week 10: Denver Broncos at San Diego Chargers – Game summary

Quarter	1	2	3	4	Total
**Broncos**	0	7	6	7	**20**
Chargers	0	6	0	7	**13**

at Jack Murphy Stadium • San Diego, California

- Date: November 9
- Game time: 2:00 p.m. MST
- Game weather: 61 °F (16 °C), wind 6 mph (10 km/h)
- Game attendance: 51,435
- Referee: Jerry Markbreit
- TV announcers (NBC): Charlie Jones (play–by–play) and Len Dawson (color commentator)

Team	Category	Player	Statistics
DEN	Passing		
DEN	Rushing		
DEN	Receiving		
SD	Passing		
SD	Rushing		
SD	Receiving		

Scoring summary

Quarter	Time	Drive			Team	Scoring information	Score	
Quarter	Time	Plays	Yards	TOP	Team	Scoring information	DEN	SD
2					Chargers	30-yard field goal by Benirschke	0	3
2					Chargers	34-yard field goal by Benirschke	0	6
2					Broncos	Lytle 3-yard touchdown run, Steinfort kick good	7	6
3					Broncos	28-yard field goal by Steinfort	10	6
3					Broncos	42-yard field goal by Steinfort	13	6
4					Broncos	Preston 4-yard touchdown run, Steinfort kick good	20	6
4					Chargers	Jefferson 3-yard touchdown reception from Fouts, Benirschke kick good	20	13
"TOP" = time of possession. For other American football terms, see Glossary of American football.							20	14

- Point spread:
- Over/under:
- Time of game:

Broncos	Game statistics	Chargers
	First downs	
	Rushes–yards	
	Passing yards	
	Passes	
	Sacked–yards	
	Net passing yards	
	Total yards	
	Return yards	
	Punts	
	Fumbles–lost	
	Penalties–yards	
	Time of possession	

Individual stats

==== Week 11 (Sunday, November 16, 1980): vs. New York Jets ====
Week 11: New York Jets at Denver Broncos – Game summary

Quarter	1	2	3	4	Total
Jets	7	10	0	7	**24**
**Broncos**	3	7	7	14	**31**

at Mile High Stadium • Denver, Colorado

- Date: November 16
- Game time: 2:00 p.m. MST
- Game attendance: 72,114
- Referee: Cal Lepore
- TV announcers (NBC): Charlie Jones (play–by–play) and Len Dawson (color commentator)

Team	Category	Player	Statistics
NYJ	Passing		
NYJ	Rushing		
NYJ	Receiving		
DEN	Passing		
DEN	Rushing		
DEN	Receiving		

Scoring summary

Quarter	Time	Drive			Team	Scoring information	Score	
Quarter	Time	Plays	Yards	TOP	Team	Scoring information	NYJ	DEN
1					Broncos	-yard field goal by Steinfort	0	3
1					Jets	Walker 36-yard touchdown reception from Todd, Leahy kick good	7	3
2					Jets	22-yard field goal by Leahy	10	3
2					Jets	Jones 31-yard touchdown reception from Todd, Leahy kick good	17	3
2					Broncos	Odoms 22-yard touchdown reception from Morton, Steinfort kick good	17	10
3					Broncos	Preston 3-yard touchdown run, Steinfort kick good	17	17
4					Broncos	Keyworth 1-yard touchdown run, Steinfort kick good	17	24
4					Jets	Dierking 1-yard touchdown run, Leahy kick good	24	24
4					Broncos	Upchurch 13-yard touchdown reception from Morton, Steinfort kick good	24	31
"TOP" = time of possession. For other American football terms, see Glossary of American football.							24	31

- Point spread:
- Over/under:
- Time of game:

Jets	Game statistics	Broncos
	First downs	
	Rushes–yards	
	Passing yards	
	Passes	
	Sacked–yards	
	Net passing yards	
	Total yards	
	Return yards	
	Punts	
	Fumbles–lost	
	Penalties–yards	
	Time of possession	

Individual stats

==== Week 12 (Sunday, November 23, 1980): vs. Seattle Seahawks ====
Week 12: Seattle Seahawks at Denver Broncos – Game summary

Quarter	1	2	3	4	Total
Seahawks	0	10	0	10	**20**
**Broncos**	7	10	3	16	**36**

at Mile High Stadium • Denver, Colorado

- Date: November 23
- Game time: 2:00 p.m. MST
- Game attendance: 73,274
- Referee: Jerry Seeman
- TV announcers (NBC): Charlie Jones (play–by–play) and Len Dawson (color commentator)

Team	Category	Player	Statistics
SEA	Passing		
SEA	Rushing		
SEA	Receiving		
DEN	Passing		
DEN	Rushing		
DEN	Receiving		

Scoring summary

Quarter	Time	Drive			Team	Scoring information	Score	
Quarter	Time	Plays	Yards	TOP	Team	Scoring information	SEA	DEN
1					Broncos	Odoms 2-yard touchdown reception from Morton, Steinfort kick good	0	7
2					Seahawks	21-yard field goal by Herrera	3	7
2		—	—	—	Seahawks	Lewis 75-yard punt return for a touchdown, Herrera kick good	10	7
2					Broncos	24-yard field goal by Steinfort	10	10
2					Broncos	Morton 1-yard touchdown run, Steinfort kick good	10	17
3					Broncos	33-yard field goal by Steinfort	10	20
4					Seahawks	20-yard field goal by Herrera	13	20
4					Broncos	Moses 27-yard touchdown reception from Morton, Steinfort kick good	13	27
4		—	—	—	Broncos	Interception returned 15 yards for touchdown by Latimer, Steinfort kick good	13	34
4		—	—	—	Broncos	Zorn tackled in end zone for a safety by Jones	13	36
4					Seahawks	McCutcheon 5-yard touchdown reception from Adkins, Herrera kick good	20	36
"TOP" = time of possession. For other American football terms, see Glossary of American football.							20	36

- Point spread:
- Over/under:
- Time of game:

Seahawks	Game statistics	Broncos
	First downs	
	Rushes–yards	
	Passing yards	
	Passes	
	Sacked–yards	
	Net passing yards	
	Total yards	
	Return yards	
	Punts	
	Fumbles–lost	
	Penalties–yards	
	Time of possession	

Individual stats

==== Week 13 (Monday, December 1, 1980): at Oakland Raiders ====
Week 13: Denver Broncos at Oakland Raiders – Game summary

Quarter	1	2	3	4	Total
Broncos	3	0	0	0	**3**
**Raiders**	0	0	6	3	**9**

at Oakland–Alameda County Coliseum • Oakland, California

- Date: December 1
- Game time: 7:00 p.m. MST
- Game attendance: 51,593
- Referee: Red Cashion
- TV announcers (ABC): Frank Gifford (play–by–play), Howard Cosell (color commentator) and Don Meredith (color commentator)

Team	Category	Player	Statistics
DEN	Passing		
DEN	Rushing		
DEN	Receiving		
OAK	Passing		
OAK	Rushing		
OAK	Receiving		

Scoring summary

Quarter	Time	Drive			Team	Scoring information	Score	
Quarter	Time	Plays	Yards	TOP	Team	Scoring information	DEN	OAK
1					Broncos	41-yard field goal by Steinfort	3	0
3					Raiders	Plunkett 8-yard touchdown run, Bahr kick no good	3	6
4					Raiders	44-yard field goal by Bahr	3	9
"TOP" = time of possession. For other American football terms, see Glossary of American football.							3	9

- Point spread:
- Over/under:
- Time of game:

Broncos	Game statistics	Raiders
	First downs	
	Rushes–yards	
	Passing yards	
	Passes	
	Sacked–yards	
	Net passing yards	
	Total yards	
	Return yards	
	Punts	
	Fumbles–lost	
	Penalties–yards	
	Time of possession	

Individual stats

==== Week 14 (Sunday, December 7, 1980): at Kansas City Chiefs ====
Week 14: Denver Broncos at Kansas City Chiefs – Game summary

Quarter	1	2	3	4	Total
Broncos	0	0	7	7	**14**
**Chiefs**	0	28	0	3	**31**

at Arrowhead Stadium • Kansas City, Missouri

- Date: December 7
- Game time: 2:00 p.m. MST
- Game attendance: 40,237
- Referee: Fred Wyant
- TV announcers (NBC): Jay Randolph (play–by–play) and Mike Haffner (color commentator)

Team	Category	Player	Statistics
DEN	Passing		
DEN	Rushing		
DEN	Receiving		
KC	Passing		
KC	Rushing		
KC	Receiving		

Scoring summary

Quarter	Time	Drive			Team	Scoring information	Score	
Quarter	Time	Plays	Yards	TOP	Team	Scoring information	DEN	KC
2					Chiefs	Smith 33-yard touchdown reception from Kenney, Lowery kick good	0	7
2					Chiefs	Morgado 1-yard touchdown run, Lowery kick good	0	14
2		—	—	—	Chiefs	Fumble recovery returned 3 yards for touchdown by Howard, Lowery kick good	0	21
2					Chiefs	Garcia 8-yard touchdown reception from Kenney, Lowery kick good	0	28
3					Broncos	Odoms 22-yard touchdown reception from Morton, Steinfort kick good	7	28
4					Broncos	Moses 4-yard touchdown reception from Morton, Steinfort kick good	14	28
4					Chiefs	20-yard field goal by Lowery	14	31
"TOP" = time of possession. For other American football terms, see Glossary of American football.							14	31

- Point spread:
- Over/under:
- Time of game:

Broncos	Game statistics	Chiefs
	First downs	
	Rushes–yards	
	Passing yards	
	Passes	
	Sacked–yards	
	Net passing yards	
	Total yards	
	Return yards	
	Punts	
	Fumbles–lost	
	Penalties–yards	
	Time of possession	

Individual stats

==== Week 15 (Sunday, December 14, 1980): vs. Oakland Raiders ====
Week 15: Oakland Raiders at Denver Broncos – Game summary

Quarter	1	2	3	4	Total
**Raiders**	7	10	0	7	**24**
Broncos	0	7	7	7	**21**

at Mile High Stadium • Denver, Colorado

- Date: December 14
- Game time: 2:00 p.m. MST
- Game attendance: 73,974
- Referee: Dick Jorgensen
- TV announcers (NBC): Don Criqui (play–by–play) and John Brodie (color commentator)

Team	Category	Player	Statistics
OAK	Passing		
OAK	Rushing		
OAK	Receiving		
DEN	Passing		
DEN	Rushing		
DEN	Receiving		

Scoring summary

Quarter	Time	Drive			Team	Scoring information	Score	
Quarter	Time	Plays	Yards	TOP	Team	Scoring information	OAK	DEN
1		—	—	—	Raiders	Interception returned 58 yards for touchdown by Owens, Bahr kick good	7	0
2					Broncos	Preston 2-yard touchdown run, Steinfort kick good	7	7
2					Raiders	44-yard field goal by Bahr	10	7
2					Raiders	Chandler 11-yard touchdown reception from Plunkett, Bahr kick good	17	7
3					Broncos	Odoms 12-yard touchdown reception from Morton, Steinfort kick good	17	14
4					Raiders	Chandler 38-yard touchdown reception from Plunkett, Bahr kick good	24	14
4					Broncos	Preston 9-yard touchdown run, Steinfort kick good	24	21
"TOP" = time of possession. For other American football terms, see Glossary of American football.							24	21

- Point spread:
- Over/under:
- Time of game:

Raiders	Game statistics	Broncos
	First downs	
	Rushes–yards	
	Passing yards	
	Passes	
	Sacked–yards	
	Net passing yards	
	Total yards	
	Return yards	
	Punts	
	Fumbles–lost	
	Penalties–yards	
	Time of possession	

Individual stats

==== Week 16 (Sunday, December 21, 1980): at Seattle Seahawks ====
Week 16: Denver Broncos at Seattle Seahawks – Game summary

Quarter	1	2	3	4	Total
**Broncos**	10	9	6	0	**25**
Seahawks	0	0	3	14	**17**

at Kingdome • Seattle, Washington

- Date: December 21
- Game time: 2:00 p.m. MST
- Game weather: indoors (dome)
- Game attendance: 51,853
- Referee: Bob McElwee
- TV announcers (NBC): Jay Randolph (play–by–play) and Gene Washington (color commentator)

Team	Category	Player	Statistics
DEN	Passing		
DEN	Rushing		
DEN	Receiving		
SEA	Passing		
SEA	Rushing		
SEA	Receiving		

Scoring summary

Quarter	Time	Drive			Team	Scoring information	Score	
Quarter	Time	Plays	Yards	TOP	Team	Scoring information	DEN	SEA
1					Broncos	53-yard field goal by Steinfort	3	0
1					Broncos	Odoms 18-yard touchdown reception from Robinson, Steinfort kick good	10	0
2					Broncos	Robinson 1-yard touchdown run, Steinfort kick no good	16	0
2					Broncos	55-yard field goal by Steinfort	19	0
3					Seahawks	47-yard field goal by Herrera	19	3
3					Broncos	34-yard field goal by Steinfort	22	3
3					Broncos	38-yard field goal by Steinfort	25	3
4					Seahawks	McCutcheon 2-yard touchdown run, Herrera kick good	25	10
4					Seahawks	Jodat 9-yard touchdown reception from Zorn, Herrera kick good	25	17
"TOP" = time of possession. For other American football terms, see Glossary of American football.							25	17

- Point spread:
- Over/under:
- Time of game:

Broncos	Game statistics	Seahawks
	First downs	
	Rushes–yards	
	Passing yards	
	Passes	
	Sacked–yards	
	Net passing yards	
	Total yards	
	Return yards	
	Punts	
	Fumbles–lost	
	Penalties–yards	
	Time of possession	

Individual stats

=== Standings ===
AFC West
	W	L	T	PCT	DIV	CONF	PF	PA	STK
^{(1)} San Diego Chargers	11	5	0	.688	6–2	9–3	418	327	W2
^{(4)} Oakland Raiders	11	5	0	.688	6–2	9–3	364	306	W2
Kansas City Chiefs	8	8	0	.500	4–4	6–8	319	336	W1
Denver Broncos	8	8	0	.500	3–5	5–7	310	323	W1
Seattle Seahawks	4	12	0	.250	1–7	3–9	291	408	L9
