= 1978 Denver Broncos season =

American football team season

- General manager: Fred Gehrke
- Head coach: Red Miller
- Home stadium: Mile High Stadium

Results
- Record: 10–6
- Division place: 1st AFC West
- Playoffs: Lost Divisional Playoffs (at Steelers) 10–33

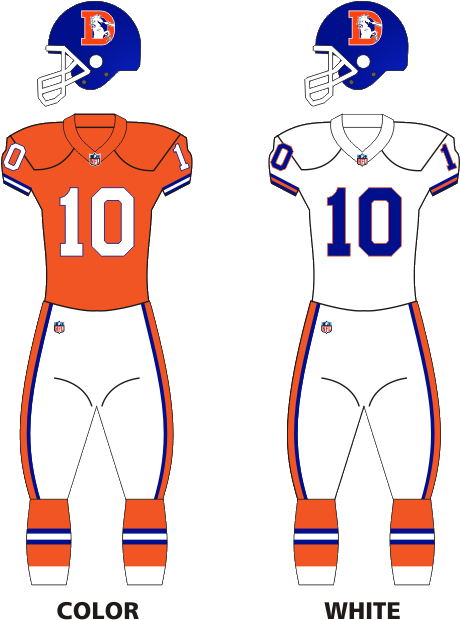
Broncos 1968-1996 uniforms

The 1978 Denver Broncos season was the team's 19th year in professional football and its ninth with the National Football League (NFL). Led by second-year head coach Red Miller, the Broncos were 10–6, repeated as champions of the AFC West, and made the playoffs for the second straight season.

In the AFC divisional round, Denver lost on the road to the top-seeded Pittsburgh Steelers, 33–10, whom they had lost to two weeks earlier in the regular season finale at Mile High Stadium; Denver had clinched their division title six days earlier with a win over struggling Kansas City, while runners-up Oakland and Seattle both lost and fell to 8–7 with San Diego, two games back with one to play.

The Broncos were fifteenth in the league in scoring offense, while the defense finished second in points allowed and sixth in yards allowed.

== Offseason ==
=== NFL draft ===
1978 Denver Broncos draft
Round	Pick	Player	Position	College	Notes
1	27	Don Latimer	DT	Miami (FL)	
2	55	Bill Gay *	TE	USC	
8	221	Frank Smith	OT	Alabama A&M	
10	277	Vince Kinney	WR	Maryland	
11	305	Lacy Brumley	OT	Clemson	
Made roster † Pro Football Hall of Fame * Made at least one Pro Bowl during career

== Personnel ==
=== Staff ===
1978 Denver Broncos staff
Front office: Owner / Chairman of the Board – Gerald Phipps; Team President – Allan Phipps; Vice President/General Manager – Fred Gehrke; Director of Player Personnel – Carroll Hardy; Head coaches: Head Coach – Red Miller; Offensive coaches: Quarterbacks – Babe Parilli; Offensive Backfield – Paul Roach; Wide Receivers – Fran Polsfoot; Offensive Line – Ken Gray	Defensive coaches: Defensive Coordinator – Joe Collier; Defensive Line – Stan Jones; Linebackers – Bob Zeman; Defensive Backs – Richie McCabe; Defensive Assistant/Special Teams Assistant – Bill Belichick; Special teams coaches: Special Teams – Marv Braden

=== Roster ===
1978 Denver Broncos roster
Quarterbacks (QB): 7 Craig Morton; 12 Craig Penrose; 14 Norris Weese; Running backs (RB): 24 Otis Armstrong; 35 Larry Canada; 32 Jon Keyworth; 41 Rob Lytle; 33 Lonnie Perrin; 46 Dave Preston; Wide receivers (WR): 82 Jack Dolbin; 84 Vince Kinney; 25 Haven Moses; 80 Rick Upchurch; Tight ends (TE): 87 Bob Moore; 88 Riley Odoms	Offensive linemen (OL): 64 Billy Bryan C; 62 Tom Glassic G; 60 Paul Howard G; 65 Glenn Hyde G/T; 50 Bobby Maples C; 71 Claudie Minor T; 76 Tom Neville T; 67 Steve Schindler G; Defensive linemen (DL): 77 Lyle Alzado DE; 68 Rubin Carter NT; 79 Barney Chavous DE; 63 John Grant NT; 72 Don Latimer NT; 66 Brison Manor DE	Linebackers (LB): 56 Larry Evans OLB; 53 Randy Gradishar ILB; 57 Tom Jackson OLB; 58 Rob Nairne OLB; 59 Joe Rizzo ILB; 51 Bob Swenson OLB; 55 Godwin Turk ILB; Defensive backs (DB): 43 Steve Foley CB; 27 Maurice Harvey CB; 29 Bernard Jackson FS; 23 Chris Pane CB/S; 36 Bill Thompson SS; 40 Charlie West FS; 20 Louis Wright CB; Special teams (ST): 10 Bucky Dilts P; 15 Jim Turner K	Reserve: 85 Ron Egloff TE (IR); 30 Jim Jensen RB (IR); 86 John Schultz WR (IR); -- Gary Silvestri DE (IR); -- Franky Smith T (IR); Rookies in italics

== Regular season ==
=== Schedule ===
Week	Date	Opponent	Result	Record	Venue	Attendance
1	September 3	**Oakland Raiders**	**W** 14–6	1–0	Mile High Stadium	75,092
2	September 11	at Minnesota Vikings	**L** 9–12 (OT)	1–1	Metropolitan Stadium	46,508
3	September 17	**San Diego Chargers**	**W** 27–14	2–1	Mile High Stadium	74,983
4	September 24	at **Kansas City Chiefs**	**W** 23–17 (OT)	3–1	Arrowhead Stadium	60,593
5	October 1	**Seattle Seahawks**	**W** 28–7	4–1	Mile High Stadium	74,989
6	October 8	at **San Diego Chargers**	**L** 0–23	4–2	San Diego Stadium	50,077
7	October 16	Chicago Bears	**W** 16–7	5–2	Mile High Stadium	75,008
8	October 22	at Baltimore Colts	**L** 6–7	5–3	Memorial Stadium	54,057
9	October 29	at **Seattle Seahawks**	**W** 20–17 (OT)	6–3	Kingdome	62,948
10	November 5	New York Jets	**L** 28–31	6–4	Mile High Stadium	74,983
11	November 12	at Cleveland Browns	**W** 19–7	7–4	Cleveland Stadium	70,856
12	November 19	Green Bay Packers	**W** 16–3	8–4	Mile High Stadium	74,965
13	November 23	at Detroit Lions	**L** 14–17	8–5	Pontiac Silverdome	71,785
14	December 3	at **Oakland Raiders**	**W** 21–6	9–5	Oakland–Alameda County Coliseum	53,932
15	December 10	**Kansas City Chiefs**	**W** 24–3	10–5	Mile High Stadium	74,149
16	December 16	Pittsburgh Steelers	**L** 17–21	10–6	Mile High Stadium	74,104
Note: Intra-division opponents are in **bold** text.

- Monday night (September 11, October 16), Thursday (November 23: Thanksgiving), Saturday (December 16)
- This was the first NFL regular season with 16 games.

=== Standings ===
AFC West
	W	L	T	PCT	DIV	CONF	PF	PA	STK
^{(3)} Denver Broncos	10	6	0	.625	7–1	8–4	282	198	L1
Oakland Raiders	9	7	0	.563	3–5	5–7	311	283	W1
Seattle Seahawks	9	7	0	.563	4–4	6–6	345	358	W1
San Diego Chargers	9	7	0	.563	5–3	7–5	355	309	W3
Kansas City Chiefs	4	12	0	.250	1–7	4–10	243	327	L2

== Playoffs ==
Round	Date	Opponent (seed)	Result	Record	Venue	Attendance
Divisional	December 30	at Pittsburgh Steelers (1)	L 10–33	0–1	Three Rivers Stadium	48,921
