= List of Denver Broncos seasons =

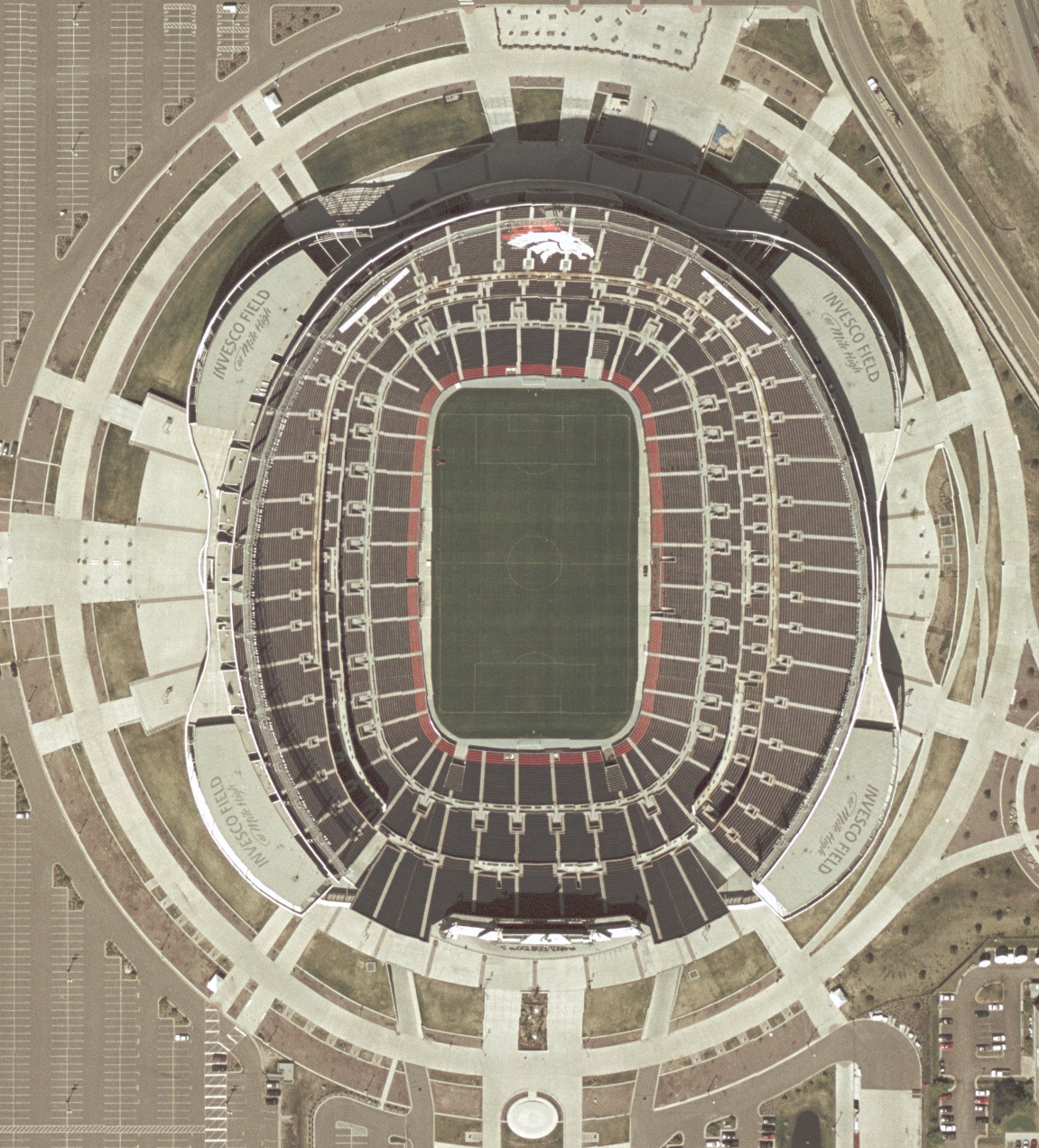
Empower Field at Mile High, where the Broncos have played their home games since 2001.

The Denver Broncos are an American football franchise based in Denver, Colorado. Founded by Bob Howsam on August 14, 1959, the team was one of the founder members of the American Football League (AFL), which began in 1960, before merging with the National Football League (NFL) ahead of the 1970 season, when the Broncos became part of the American Football Conference (AFC) West division; they have been in the same division ever since. As of the end of the 2020 season, Denver has completed 61 seasons (playing in over 970 combined regular season and playoff games), and has appeared in eight Super Bowls; although they lost in each of their first four Super Bowl appearances, they have since won three of them, most recently Super Bowl 50.

The franchise has experienced three major periods of success. The first was from 1976 to 1981, when the Broncos did not have a losing season (a season when the team has more losses than wins), and won two AFC West division titles, and one AFC championship. The second began in 1983 and ended in 1998. During this period, the Broncos had just two losing seasons, were AFC champions five times and were Super Bowl champions for two consecutive years. This second period of success is best remembered for John Elway being the team's quarterback. The most recent run of success began in 2011, lasting until their victory in Super Bowl 50 at the end of the 2015 season. The five-year stretch was primarily spearheaded by the 2012 free agent acquisition of the then four-time League MVP former Indianapolis Colts quarterback Peyton Manning, and included five AFC West titles, two AFC championships, as well as the Super Bowl. From their inaugural season in 1960 until 1975, they did not make either the AFL playoffs or NFL playoffs and had just two winning seasons. The Broncos were the only charter AFL franchise to never have a winning season during the AFL's 10 years of existence (although the team finished at 7–7 in 1962), with their first winning season not occurring until 1973, their fourth year as a member of the NFL's AFC. They also experienced their two seasons with the fewest wins ever, winning just two of 14 games in both 1963 and 1964.

The Broncos have been AFC West champions 16 times, winning the division for five consecutive seasons from 2011 to 2015, and have also earned wild card berths into the playoffs seven times, for a total of 24 playoff appearances. They have been conference champions eight times (tied with the Pittsburgh Steelers, and two behind the New England Patriots who have the most AFC championships) and Super Bowl champions thrice.

== Seasons ==
Legend
^{(#)}	The order of league championship won by the franchise
Finish	Final position in league, division, or conference
Pct	The team's winning percentage for the season
^{†}	Super Bowl champions (1970–present)
^{*}	Conference champions
^{^}	Division champions
^{§}	Wild Card berth

Denver Broncos record by season
Season	Team	League	Conference	Division	Regular season				Postseason results	Awards	Head coach	Refs
Season	Team	League	Conference	Division	Finish	W	L	T	Postseason results	Awards	Head coach	Refs
1960	1960	AFL		West	4th	4	9	1			Frank Filchock	
1961	1961	AFL		West	3rd	3	11	0			Frank Filchock	
1962	1962	AFL		West	2nd	7	7	0		Jack Faulkner (COY)	Jack Faulkner	
1963	1963	AFL		West	4th	2	11	1			Jack Faulkner	
1964	1964	AFL		West	4th	2	11	1			Jack Faulkner (0–4) Mac Speedie (2–7–1)	
1965	1965	AFL		West	4th	4	10	0			Mac Speedie	
1966	1966	AFL		West	4th	4	10	0			Mac Speedie (0–2) Ray Malavasi (4–8)	
1967	1967	AFL		West	4th	3	11	0			Lou Saban	
1968	1968	AFL		West	4th	5	9	0			Lou Saban	
1969	1969	AFL		West	4th	5	8	1			Lou Saban	
1970	1970	NFL (Note: In 1970, the NFL and American Football League (AFL) officially merged in the AFL–NFL merger to form one league with two conferences. All ten former AFL teams as well as Pittsburgh, Cleveland, and Baltimore from the pre-merger NFL joined the AFC; the other thirteen remaining NFL teams joined the NFC. Each of those two were divided into three divisions: East, Central, and West.)	AFC	West	4th	5	8	1			Lou Saban	
1971	1971	NFL	AFC	West	4th	4	9	1			Lou Saban (2–6–1) Jerry Smith (2–3)	
1972	1972	NFL	AFC	West	3rd	5	9	0			John Ralston	
1973	1973	NFL	AFC	West	3rd	7	5	2			John Ralston	
1974	1974	NFL	AFC	West	2nd	7	6	1			John Ralston	
1975	1975	NFL	AFC	West	2nd	6	8	0			John Ralston	
1976	1976	NFL	AFC	West	2nd	9	5	0			John Ralston	
1977	1977	NFL	AFC^{*}	West^{^}	1st^{^}	12	2	0	Won Divisional Playoffs (Steelers) 34–21; Won AFC Championship (Raiders) 20–17; Lost Super Bowl XII (vs. Cowboys) 10–27	Red Miller (COY)	Red Miller	
1978	1978	NFL	AFC	West^{^}	1st^{^}	10	6	0	Lost Divisional Playoffs (at Steelers) 10–33	Randy Gradishar (DPOY)	Red Miller	(Note: In 1978, the NFL expanded its regular season schedule, which had been 14 games since 1961, to 16 games.)
1979	1979	NFL	AFC	West	2nd^{§}	10	6	0	Lost Wild Card Playoffs (at Oilers) 7–13		Red Miller	
1980	1980	NFL	AFC	West	4th	8	8	0			Red Miller	
1981	1981	NFL	AFC	West	2nd	10	6	0			Dan Reeves	
1982	1982	NFL	AFC	None (Note: The 1982 season was shortened to nine games after a players' strike. The top eight teams in each conference advanced to the playoffs.)	12th	2	7	0			Dan Reeves	
1983	1983	NFL	AFC	West	3rd^{§}	9	7	0	Lost Wild Card Playoffs (at Seahawks) 7–31		Dan Reeves	
1984	1984	NFL	AFC	West^{^}	1st^{^}	13	3	0	Lost Divisional Playoffs (Steelers) 17–24		Dan Reeves	
1985	1985	NFL	AFC	West	2nd	11	5	0			Dan Reeves	
1986	1986	NFL	AFC^{*}	West^{^}	1st^{^}	11	5	0	Won Divisional Playoffs (Patriots) 22–17; Won AFC Championship (at Browns) 23–20 (OT); Lost Super Bowl XXI (vs. Giants) 20–39		Dan Reeves	
1987	1987	NFL	AFC^{*}	West^{^}	1st^{^}	10	4	1	Won Divisional Playoffs (Oilers) 34–10; Won AFC Championship (Browns) 38–33; Lost Super Bowl XXII (vs. Redskins) 10–42	John Elway (MVP)	Dan Reeves	(Note: The 1987 NFL strike caused the schedule to be reduced to 15 games.)
1988	1988	NFL	AFC	West	2nd	8	8	0			Dan Reeves	
1989	1989	NFL	AFC^{*}	West^{^}	1st^{^}	11	5	0	Won Divisional Playoffs (Steelers) 24–23; Won AFC Championship (Browns) 37–21; Lost Super Bowl XXIV (vs. 49ers) 10–55		Dan Reeves	
1990	1990	NFL	AFC	West	5th	5	11	0			Dan Reeves	
1991	1991	NFL	AFC	West^{^}	1st^{^}	12	4	0	Won Divisional Playoffs (Oilers) 26–24; Lost AFC Championship (at Bills) 7–10	Mike Croel (DROY)	Dan Reeves	
1992	1992	NFL	AFC	West	3rd	8	8	0			Dan Reeves	
1993	1993	NFL	AFC	West	3rd^{§}	9	7	0	Lost Wild Card Playoffs (at Raiders) 24–42		Wade Phillips	
1994	1994	NFL	AFC	West	4th	7	9	0			Wade Phillips	
1995	1995	NFL	AFC	West	3rd	8	8	0			Mike Shanahan	
1996	1996	NFL	AFC	West^{^}	1st^{^}	13	3	0	Lost Divisional Playoffs (Jaguars) 27–30	Terrell Davis (OPOY)	Mike Shanahan	
1997	1997	NFL^{†}	AFC^{*}	West	2nd^{§}	12	4	0	Won Wild Card Playoffs (Jaguars) 42–17; Won Divisional Playoffs (at Chiefs) 14–10; Won AFC Championship (at Steelers) 24–21; Won Super Bowl XXXII (1) (vs. Packers) 31–24	Terrell Davis (SB MVP)	Mike Shanahan	
1998	1998	NFL^{†}	AFC^{*}	West^{^}	1st^{^}	14	2	0	Won Divisional Playoffs (Dolphins) 38–3; Won AFC Championship (Jets) 23–10; Won Super Bowl XXXIII (2) (vs. Falcons) 34–19	Terrell Davis (MVP, OPOY) John Elway (SB MVP)	Mike Shanahan	
1999	1999	NFL	AFC	West	5th	6	10	0			Mike Shanahan	
2000	2000	NFL	AFC	West	2nd^{§}	11	5	0	Lost Wild Card Playoffs (at Ravens) 3–21	Mike Anderson (OROY)	Mike Shanahan	
2001	2001	NFL	AFC	West	3rd	8	8	0			Mike Shanahan	
2002	2002	NFL	AFC	West (Note: In 2002, the NFL realigned to create four divisions in both conferences with four teams in each division. The Broncos did not change divisions, but their division did change from five teams to four.)	2nd	9	7	0		Clinton Portis (OROY)	Mike Shanahan	
2003	2003	NFL	AFC	West	2nd^{§}	10	6	0	Lost Wild Card Playoffs (at Colts) 10–41		Mike Shanahan	
2004	2004	NFL	AFC	West	2nd^{§}	10	6	0	Lost Wild Card Playoffs (at Colts) 24–49		Mike Shanahan	
2005	2005	NFL	AFC	West^{^}	1st^{^}	13	3	0	Won Divisional Playoffs (Patriots) 27–13; Lost AFC Championship (Steelers) 17–34		Mike Shanahan	
2006	2006	NFL	AFC	West	3rd	9	7	0			Mike Shanahan	
2007	2007	NFL	AFC	West	2nd	7	9	0			Mike Shanahan	
2008	2008	NFL	AFC	West	2nd	8	8	0			Mike Shanahan	
2009	2009	NFL	AFC	West	2nd	8	8	0			Josh McDaniels	
2010	2010	NFL	AFC	West	4th	4	12	0			Josh McDaniels (3–9) Eric Studesville (1–3)	
2011	2011	NFL	AFC	West^{^}	1st^{^}	8	8	0	Won Wild Card Playoffs (Steelers) 29–23 (OT); Lost Divisional Playoffs (at Patriots) 10–45	Von Miller (DROY)	John Fox	
2012	2012	NFL	AFC	West^{^}	1st^{^}	13	3	0	Lost Divisional Playoffs (Ravens) 35–38 (2OT)	Peyton Manning (CBPOY)	John Fox	
2013	2013	NFL	AFC^{*}	West^{^}	1st^{^}	13	3	0	Won Divisional Playoffs (Chargers) 24–17; Won AFC Championship (Patriots) 26–16; Lost Super Bowl XLVIII (vs. Seahawks) 8–43	Peyton Manning (MVP, OPOY)	John Fox	
2014	2014	NFL	AFC	West^{^}	1st^{^}	12	4	0	Lost Divisional Playoffs (Colts) 13–24		John Fox	
2015	2015	NFL^{†}	AFC^{*}	West^{^}	1st^{^}	12	4	0	Won Divisional Playoffs (Steelers) 23–16; Won AFC Championship (Patriots) 20–18; Won Super Bowl 50 (3) (vs. Panthers) 24–10	Von Miller (SB MVP)	Gary Kubiak	
2016	2016	NFL	AFC	West	3rd	9	7	0			Gary Kubiak	
2017	2017	NFL	AFC	West	4th	5	11	0			Vance Joseph	
2018	2018	NFL	AFC	West	3rd	6	10	0			Vance Joseph	
2019	2019	NFL	AFC	West	2nd	7	9	0			Vic Fangio	
2020	2020	NFL	AFC	West	4th	5	11	0			Vic Fangio	
2021	2021	NFL	AFC	West	4th	7	10	0			Vic Fangio	(Note: In 2021, the NFL expanded its regular season schedule, which had been 16 games since 1978, to 17 games.)
2022	2022	NFL	AFC	West	4th	5	12	0			Nathaniel Hackett (4–11) Jerry Rosburg (1–1)	
2023	2023	NFL	AFC	West	3rd	8	9	0			Sean Payton	
2024	2024	NFL	AFC	West	3rd^{§}	10	7	0	Lost Wild Card Playoffs (at Bills) 7–31	Patrick Surtain II (DPOY)	Sean Payton	
2025	2025	NFL	AFC	West^{^}	1st^{^}	14	3	0	Won Divisional Playoffs (Bills) 33–30 (OT); Lost AFC Championship (Patriots) 7–10		Sean Payton	
Totals						532	475	10	All-time regular season record (1960–2025)			
Totals						24	21	—	All-time postseason record (1960–2025)			
Totals						556	496	10	All-time regular season & postseason record (1960–2025)			
