= Red Miller =

American football player and coach (1927–2017)

Personal information
- Born: October 31, 1927; Macomb, Illinois, U.S.
- Died: September 27, 2017 (aged 89); Denver, Colorado, U.S.

Career information
- College: Western Illinois

Career history
- Boston Patriots (1960–1961) Offensive line coach; Buffalo Bills (1962) Offensive line coach; Denver Broncos (1963–1965) Offensive line coach; St. Louis Cardinals (1966–1970) Offensive line coach; Baltimore Colts (1971–1972) Offensive line coach; New England Patriots (1973–1976) Offensive line coach; Denver Broncos (1977–1980) Head coach; Denver Gold (1983) Head coach

Awards and highlights
- AP NFL Coach of the Year (1977); Denver Broncos Ring of Fame

Head coaching record
- Regular season: 40–22 (.645)
- Postseason: 2–3 (.400)
- Career: 42–25 (.627)
- Coaching profile at Pro Football Reference

Robert "Red" Miller (October 31, 1927 – September 27, 2017) was an American professional football coach. He served as the head coach for the Denver Broncos of the National Football League (NFL) from 1977 to 1980. In his first year as Denver's head coach, he led the 1977 Broncos to Super Bowl XII, where they lost to the Dallas Cowboys. Miller was also the head coach of the Denver Gold of the United States Football League (USFL) for one season, in 1983.

== Early life and career ==
Born and raised in Macomb, Illinois, Miller attended Macomb Public Schools and Western Illinois University, where he was later a star player and coach for the Leathernecks football team. He began his coaching career at high schools in Astoria and Canton, Illinois, and at Carthage College.

== Assistant coach ==
Miller was an assistant coach with Lou Saban at Western Illinois in the late 1950s before joining Saban with the Boston Patriots of the newly formed American Football League (AFL) in 1960. He also was an assistant with Buffalo Bills (1962), Denver Broncos (1963–1965), St. Louis Cardinals (1966–1970), Baltimore Colts (1971–1972), and New England Patriots (1973–1976) before rejoining the Broncos as head coach.

== Head coach ==
=== Denver Broncos ===
Miller was named head coach of the Denver Broncos on February 1, 1977, replacing John Ralston, who resigned the previous day, after his best season. Miller took a team led by linebackers Randy Gradishar, Bob Swenson, and Tom Jackson, cornerbacks Louis Wright and Bernard Jackson, safety Billy Thompson, and defensive end Lyle Alzado— mainstays of the Orange Crush Defense— and veteran quarterback Craig Morton (acquired via trade with the New York Giants) to a 12–2 regular season record and an AFC championship. The Broncos then faced the Tom Landry-coached Dallas Cowboys in Super Bowl XII but lost, 27–10.

The following season, Broncos won the AFC West again at 10–6, but lost their AFC divisional playoff against the Pittsburgh Steelers at Three Rivers Stadium on December 30, 33–10. They also lost the next season to the Houston Oilers 13–7 in a classic wild card playoff in the Astrodome on December 23, 1979.

After posting an 8–8 record in 1980 and failing to return to the AFC playoffs, Miller was fired by new owner Edgar Kaiser in March 1981, and was succeeded by Dan Reeves, previously the Dallas Cowboys' offensive coordinator and a former NFL running back.

=== Denver Gold ===
In 1983, Miller became the first head coach of the Denver Gold of the new United States Football League (USFL), but feuded bitterly with team owner Ron Blanding and was fired before the completion of the league's first season.

== Honors and death ==
On May 4, 2017, it was announced that Miller would be inducted into the Denver Broncos Ring of Fame, the only inductee that season.

Miller died at the age of 89 on September 27, 2017, from complications due to a stroke. He was buried at Fairmount Cemetery in Denver.

== Head coaching record ==
| Year | Team | Regular season | | | | | Postseason | | | |
| Year | Team | Won | Lost | Ties | Win % | Finish | Won | Lost | Win % | Result |
|---|---|---|---|---|---|---|---|---|---|---|
| 1977 | DEN | 12 | 2 | 0 | .857 | 1st in AFC West | 2 | 1 | .667 | Lost to Dallas Cowboys in Super Bowl XII |
| 1978 | DEN | 10 | 6 | 0 | .625 | 1st in AFC West | 0 | 1 | .000 | Lost to Pittsburgh Steelers in AFC Divisional Game |
| 1979 | DEN | 10 | 6 | 0 | .625 | 2nd in AFC West | 0 | 1 | .000 | Lost to Houston Oilers in AFC wild card game |
| 1980 | DEN | 8 | 8 | 0 | .500 | 4th in AFC West | – | – | – | – |
| DEN Total | | 40 | 22 | 0 | .645 | | 2 | 3 | .400 | |
| NFL Total | | 40 | 22 | 0 | .645 | | 2 | 3 | .400 | |
