= Riley Odoms =

American football player (born 1950)

No. 88
- Position: Tight end

Personal information
- Born: March 1, 1950 (age 76); Luling, Texas, U.S.
- Listed height: 6 ft 4 in (1.93 m)
- Listed weight: 230 lb (104 kg)

Career information
- High school: West Oso (Corpus Christi, Texas)
- College: Houston
- NFL draft: 1972: 1st round, 5th overall pick

Career history
- Denver Broncos (1972–1983)

Awards and highlights
- 2× First-team All-Pro (1974, 1975); Second-team All-Pro (1977); 4× Pro Bowl (1973–1975, 1978); Denver Broncos Ring of Fame; Second-team All-American (1971)

Career NFL statistics
- Receptions: 396
- Receiving yards: 5,755
- Total TDs: 44
- Stats at Pro Football Reference

Riley Mackey Odoms (born March 1, 1950) is an American former professional football player who was a tight end for the Denver Broncos of the National Football League (NFL). He played college football at the University of Houston, where he had a highlight year in 1971 with 45 catches for 730 yards and eight touchdowns after playing sparingly the two seasons prior.

Odoms played his entire NFL career with Denver. He was drafted fifth overall in the first round of the 1972 NFL draft, which tied him with Hall of Famer Mike Ditka for the highest drafted tight end ever in the NFL draft. That record stood for 49 years until the 2021 NFL draft, where University of Florida TE Kyle Pitts was selected fourth overall by the Atlanta Falcons.

Odoms was a four-time Pro Bowl selection and was a two-time All-Pro. He finished his career with 396 receptions for 5,755 yards and 41 touchdowns.

Odoms is the grandson of Baseball Hall of Famer Biz Mackey.

Odoms was inducted into the Broncos' Ring of Fame in 2024.

== NFL career statistics ==
Legend
**Bold**	Career high

=== Regular season ===
Year	Team	Games		Receiving				
Year	Team	GP	GS	Rec	Yds	Avg	Lng	TD
1972	DEN	14	0	21	320	15.2	**48**	1
1973	DEN	14	14	43	629	14.6	47	**7**
1974	DEN	14	14	42	639	15.2	41	6
1975	DEN	14	14	40	544	13.6	43	3
1976	DEN	14	14	30	477	15.9	47	3
1977	DEN	14	14	37	429	11.6	33	3
1978	DEN	**16**	**16**	**54**	**829**	15.4	42	6
1979	DEN	13	12	40	638	**16.0**	45	1
1980	DEN	15	15	39	590	15.1	30	6
1981	DEN	15	15	38	516	13.6	28	5
1982	DEN	8	6	8	82	10.3	18	0
1983	DEN	2	0	4	62	15.5	21	0
		153	134	396	5,755	14.5	48	41

=== Playoffs ===
Year	Team	Games		Receiving				
Year	Team	GP	GS	Rec	Yds	Avg	Lng	TD
1977	DEN	**3**	**3**	**8**	**65**	8.1	**30**	**1**
1978	DEN	1	1	1	24	**24.0**	24	0
1979	DEN	1	1	2	3	1.5	3	0
1983	DEN	1	0	0	0	0.0	0	0
		6	5	11	92	8.4	30	1
