= Luke Prestridge =

American football player (born 1956)

No. 11, 17
- Position: Punter

Personal information
- Born: September 17, 1956 (age 70); Houston, Texas, U.S.
- Listed height: 6 ft 4 in (1.93 m)
- Listed weight: 235 lb (107 kg)

Career information
- High school: Sharpstown (Houston, Texas)
- College: Baylor
- NFL draft: 1979: 7th round, 188th overall pick

Career history
- Denver Broncos (1979–1983); New England Patriots (1984)

Awards and highlights
- First-team All-Pro (1982); Pro Bowl (1982)

Career NFL statistics
- Punts: 421
- Punting yards: 17,638
- Longest punt: 89
- Stats at Pro Football Reference

Luke Prestridge (born September 17, 1956) is an American former professional football player who was a punter in the National Football League (NFL) for the Denver Broncos (1979–1983) and the New England Patriots (1984). He was selected to the Pro Bowl after the 1982 season as a member of the Denver Broncos. He played high school football at Sharpstown High School in Houston and college football at Baylor University.

As of 2017's NFL off-season, Luke Prestridge held at the Broncos franchise records for punts in a game (12; tied with 2 others), and career post-season yards per punt (45.7). In a 1984 game in Week 8 between the New England Patriots and Miami Dolphins, Prestridge booted an 89-yard punt, which at the time tied an NFL record for longest punt. Through the 2018 NFL season, it remained the fourth longest punt in the NFL Super Bowl era.

== NFL career statistics ==
Legend
	Led the league
**Bold**	Career high

=== Regular season ===
Year	Team	Punting									
Year	Team	GP	Punts	Yds	Net Yds	Lng	Avg	Net Avg	Blk	Ins20	TB
1979	DEN	**16**	**89**	3,555	2,935	63	39.9	33.0	0	17	**7**
1980	DEN	**16**	70	3,075	2,512	57	43.9	35.9	0	10	6
1981	DEN	**16**	86	3,478	**2,990**	67	40.4	34.8	0	**20**	5
1982	DEN	9	45	2,026	1,699	65	**45.0**	**37.8**	0	14	5
1983	DEN	**16**	87	**3,620**	2,956	60	41.6	34.0	0	19	**7**
1984	NWE	9	44	1,884	1,556	**89**	42.8	35.4	0	8	5
Career		82	421	17,638	14,648	89	41.9	34.8	0	88	35

=== Playoffs ===
Year	Team	Punting									
Year	Team	GP	Punts	Yds	Net Yds	Lng	Avg	Net Avg	Blk	Ins20	TB
1979	DEN	**1**	**6**	**266**	**224**	**52**	44.3	**37.3**	0	**3**	0
1983	DEN	**1**	4	191	133	49	**47.8**	33.3	0	0	0
Career		2	10	457	357	52	45.7	35.7	0	3	0
