= Laval Short =

American football player (born 1958)

No. 63, 64, 92
- Position: Defensive tackle

Personal information
- Born: September 29, 1958 (age 68); Nashville, Tennessee, U.S.
- Listed height: 6 ft 3 in (1.91 m)
- Listed weight: 250 lb (113 kg)

Career information
- High school: Denver (CO) East
- College: Colorado
- NFL draft: 1980: 5th round, 136th overall pick

Career history
- Denver Broncos (1980); Tampa Bay Buccaneers (1981); Denver Gold (1983); Pittsburgh Maulers (1984)

Awards and highlights
- Second-team All-Big Eight (1978)
- Stats at Pro Football Reference

Laval Short (born September 29, 1958) is an American former professional football player who was a defensive tackle in the National Football League (NFL). He played college football for the Colorado Buffaloes. He played in the NFL for the Denver Broncos in 1980 and Tampa Bay Buccaneers in 1981. He then played in the United States Football League (USFL) for the Denver Gold in 1983 and Pittsburgh Maulers in 1984.
