= 1979–80 NFL playoffs =

American football tournament

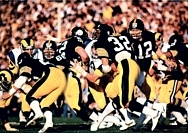
- The Steelers playing against the Rams in Super Bowl XIV.
- Dates: December 23, 1979–January 20, 1980
- Season: 1979
- Teams: 10
- Games played: 9
- Super Bowl XIV site: Rose Bowl; Pasadena, California
- Defending champions: Pittsburgh Steelers
- Champion: Pittsburgh Steelers (4th title)
- Runner-up: Los Angeles Rams
- Conference runners-up: Houston Oilers; Tampa Bay Buccaneers
NFL playoffs
← 1978–79	1980–81 →

The National Football League playoffs for the 1979 season began on December 23, 1979. The postseason tournament concluded with the Pittsburgh Steelers defeating the Los Angeles Rams in Super Bowl XIV, 31–19, on January 20, 1980, at the Rose Bowl in Pasadena, California.

This postseason marked the first time since the league introduced seeding in 1975 that both No. 1 seeds lost their opening playoff game in the Divisional Round. This would not happen again until 2008, and subsequently, in 2010 and 2021.

In addition, this was also first time both No. 1 seeds failed to advance to the Super Bowl.

== Participants ==
Within each conference, the three division winners and the two non-division winners with the best overall regular season records qualified for the playoffs. The NFL did not use a fixed-bracket playoff system. The three division winners were seeded 1–3 based on their overall won-lost-tied record, and received a first-round bye while the wild card teams were seeded 4 and 5, and played in the first round, dubbed the wild-card playoffs or wild-card weekend, with the 4 seed hosting. The second round, the divisional playoffs, had a restriction where two teams from the same division could not meet: the surviving wild card team visited the division champion outside its division that had the higher seed, and the remaining two teams from that conference played each other. The two surviving teams from each conference's divisional playoff games then met in the respective AFC and NFC Conference Championship games, hosted by the higher seed. Finally the Super Bowl, the championship round of the playoffs, was played at a neutral site, with the designated home team based on an annual rotation by conference.

Playoff seeds
Seed	AFC	NFC
1	San Diego Chargers (West winner)	Dallas Cowboys (East winner)
2	Pittsburgh Steelers (Central winner)	Tampa Bay Buccaneers (Central winner)
3	Miami Dolphins (East winner)	Los Angeles Rams (West winner)
4	Houston Oilers (wild card)	Philadelphia Eagles (wild card)
5	Denver Broncos (wild card)	Chicago Bears (wild card)

== Bracket ==
Dec 30 – Texas Stadium
3	Los Angeles	21
Dec 23 – Veterans Stadium	Jan 6 – Tampa Stadium
1*	Dallas	19
NFC
5	Chicago	17	3	Los Angeles	9
Dec 29 – Tampa Stadium
4	Philadelphia	27	2	Tampa Bay	0
NFC Championship
4	Philadelphia	17
Jan 20 – Rose Bowl
2*	Tampa Bay	24
Divisional round
Wild-card round	N3	Los Angeles	19
Dec 29 – San Diego Stadium
A2	Pittsburgh	31
Super Bowl XIV
4	Houston	17
Dec 23 – Astrodome	Jan 6 – Three Rivers Stadium
1	San Diego	14
AFC
5	Denver	7	4	Houston	13
Dec 30 – Three Rivers Stadium
4	Houston	13	2	Pittsburgh	27
AFC Championship
3	Miami	14
2	Pittsburgh	34

Note: The Dallas Cowboys (the NFC 1 seed) did not play the Philadelphia Eagles (the 4 seed) in the Divisional playoff round because both teams were in the same division.

== Schedule ==
In the United States, NBC broadcast the AFC playoff games, while CBS televised the NFC games and Super Bowl XIV.

Round	Away team	Score	Home team	Date	Kickoff (ET / UTC−5)	TV
Wild-card round	Chicago Bears	17–27	Philadelphia Eagles	December 23, 1979	12:30 p.m.	CBS
Wild-card round	Denver Broncos	7–13	Houston Oilers	December 23, 1979	4:00 p.m.	NBC
Divisional round	Philadelphia Eagles	17–24	Tampa Bay Buccaneers	December 29, 1979	12:30 p.m.	CBS
Divisional round	Houston Oilers	17–14	San Diego Chargers	December 29, 1979	4:00 p.m.	NBC
Divisional round	Miami Dolphins	14–34	Pittsburgh Steelers	December 30, 1979	12:30 p.m.	NBC
Divisional round	Los Angeles Rams	21–19	Dallas Cowboys	December 30, 1979	4:00 p.m.	CBS
Conference championships	Houston Oilers	13–27	Pittsburgh Steelers	January 6, 1980	1:00 p.m.	NBC
Conference championships	Los Angeles Rams	9–0	Tampa Bay Buccaneers	January 6, 1980	5:00 p.m.	CBS
Super Bowl XIV Rose Bowl Pasadena, California	Los Angeles Rams	19–31	Pittsburgh Steelers	January 20, 1980	6:00 p.m.	CBS

== Wild-card round ==
=== Sunday, December 23, 1979 ===
==== NFC: Philadelphia Eagles 27, Chicago Bears 17 ====
Chicago Bears vs. Philadelphia Eagles – Game summary

Quarter	1	2	3	4	Total
Bears	7	10	0	0	17
Eagles	7	3	7	10	27

at Veterans Stadium, Philadelphia

- Game time: 12:30 p.m. EST
- Game attendance: 69,397
- Referee: Red Cashion
- TV announcers (CBS): Vin Scully and George Allen

Game information

First quarter

- PHI – Harold Carmichael 17-yard pass from Ron Jaworski (Tony Franklin kick). Eagles 7–0.
- CHI – Walter Payton 2-yard run (Bob Thomas kick). Tied 7–7.

Second quarter

- PHI – Tony Franklin 29-yard field goal. Eagles 10–7.
- CHI – Walter Payton 1-yard run (Bob Thomas kick). Bears 14–10.
- CHI – Bob Thomas 30-yard field goal. Bears 17–10.

Third quarter

- PHI – Harold Carmichael 29-yard pass from Ron Jaworski (Tony Franklin kick). Tied 17–17.

Fourth quarter

- PHI – Billy Campfield 63-yard pass from Ron Jaworski (Tony Franklin kick). Eagles 24–17.
- PHI – Tony Franklin 34-yard field goal. Eagles 27–17.

Top passers

- CHI – Mike Phipps – 13/30, 142 yards, 2 INT
- PHI – Ron Jaworski – 12/23, 204 yards, 3 TD, INT

Top rushers

- CHI – Walter Payton – 16 rushes, 67 yards, 2 TD
- PHI – Wilbert Montgomery – 26 rushes, 87 yards

Top receivers

- CHI – Walter Payton – 3 receptions, 52 yards
- PHI – Harold Carmichael – 6 receptions, 111 yards, 2 TD

In the first NFL postseason game played in Philadelphia since the 1960 NFL Championship Game, Eagles Quarterback Ron Jaworski threw for 204 yards and 3 touchdown passes as Philadelphia overcame a 17–10 Bears halftime lead. The Eagles scored first when Jaworski threw a 17-yard touchdown pass to wide receiver Harold Carmichael. Chicago responded with an 82-yard drive to score on running back Walter Payton's 2-yard rushing touchdown. Then after Philadelphia added a field goal from Tony Franklin, Payton scored again on a 1-yard touchdown run. Later in the second quarter, Bears lineman Alan Page recovered a fumble from Jaworski on the Eagles 16-yard line, leading to Bob Thomas' 30-yard field goal that gave Chicago a 17–10 halftime lead.

In the third quarter, Payton ripped off an 84-yard run on his first carry, but it was called back by an illegal motion penalty against receiver Brian Baschnagel. Following a punt, the Eagles tied the game on Jaworski's 29-yard touchdown pass to Carmichael. Chicago responded with a drive to the Philadelphia 9-yard line, but defensive back Bob Howard ended the scoring threat by intercepting Mike Phipps in the end zone. A few plays later, Jaworski threw a 63-yard touchdown to running back Billy Campfield to take the lead for good.

Over 12 minutes remained in the game at this point, but the Bears would only manage one first down during this time. With 7:31 left, Philly linebacker Jerry Robinson recovered a fumble from Bears receiver Dave Williams that set up Franklin's 34-yard field goal. Chicago got one last chance to score when linebacker Gary Campbell recovered a fumble from Eagles running back Wilbert Montgomery on the Philadelphia 28. But their ensuing drive ended with another turnover, this time an interception by defensive back Herm Edwards.

Carmichael finished the game with 6 receptions for 111 yards and two touchdowns.

Had the Bears won, they would have faced the number one seed Cowboys. Ineligible to play against Dallas, the Eagles instead played the number two seed Buccaneers in the Divisional Round while the Cowboys faced the Rams. The Eagles' wild card victory therefore ensured that a team other than the Cowboys, Rams or Minnesota Vikings would reach the NFC Championship Game for the first time since the Washington Redskins' appearance in the 1972 title game.

This was the first postseason meeting between the Bears and Eagles.

==== AFC: Houston Oilers 13, Denver Broncos 7 ====
Denver Broncos vs. Houston Oilers – Game summary

Quarter	1	2	3	4	Total
Broncos	7	0	0	0	7
Oilers	3	7	0	3	13

at Houston Astrodome, Houston

- Game time: 4:00 p.m. EST
- Game attendance: 48,776
- Referee: Gene Barth
- TV announcers (NBC): Charlie Jones and Len Dawson

Game information

First quarter

- DEN – Dave Preston 7-yard pass from Craig Morton (Jim Turner kick). Broncos 7–0.
- HOU – Toni Fritsch 31-yard field goal. Broncos 7–3.

Second quarter

- HOU – Earl Campbell 3-yard run (Toni Fritsch kick). Oilers 10–7.

Third quarter

- No scoring plays.

Fourth quarter

- HOU – Toni Fritsch 20-yard field goal. Oilers 13–7.

Top passers

- DEN – Craig Morton – 14/23, 144 yards, TD, INT
- HOU – Dan Pastorini – 12/20, 149 yards, INT

Top rushers

- DEN – Otis Armstrong – 12 rushes, 51 yards
- HOU – Rob Carpenter – 16 rushes, 59 yards

Top receivers

- DEN – Rick Upchurch – 4 receptions, 48 yards
- HOU – Mike Renfro – 5 receptions, 63 yards

The Oilers managed to shut down the Broncos offense for most of the game en route to a 13–7 win, holding the Broncos to 216 yards and recording six sacks.

Oilers quarterback Dan Pastorini's 41-yard completion to running back Ron Coleman set up the game's first score on Toni Fritsch 31-yard field goal. Denver then marched 80 yards in 13 plays to score on quarterback Craig Morton's 7-yard touchdown pass to running back Dave Preston. From that point on, the Oilers controlled the rest of the game. With less than 3 minutes left in the first half, Houston advanced 74 yards to score on running back Earl Campbell's 3-yard touchdown run. Although Campbell, Pastorini, and receiver Ken Burrough all missed the second half with injuries, the Oilers defense continued to dominate. In the fourth quarter, a 15-yard interception return to the Broncos 20-yard line by linebacker Gregg Bingham set up Fritsch's 20-yard field goal with 4:18 left in regulation.

This was the first postseason meeting between the Broncos and Oilers.

== Divisional round ==
=== Saturday, December 29, 1979 ===
==== NFC: Tampa Bay Buccaneers 24, Philadelphia Eagles 17 ====
Philadelphia Eagles vs. Tampa Bay Buccaneers – Game summary

Quarter	1	2	3	4	Total
Eagles	0	7	3	7	17
Buccaneers	7	10	0	7	24

at Tampa Stadium, Tampa, Florida

- Game time: 12:30 p.m. EST
- Game weather: 73 °F (23 °C), scattered clouds
- Game attendance: 71,402
- Referee: Fred Silva
- TV announcers (CBS): Curt Gowdy and Hank Stram

Game information

First quarter

- TB – Ricky Bell 4-yard run (Neil O'Donoghue kick). Buccaneers 7–0.

Second quarter

- TB – Neil O'Donoghue 40-yard field goal. Buccaneers 10–0.
- TB – Ricky Bell 1-yard run (Neil O'Donoghue kick). Buccaneers 17–0.
- PHI – Charlie Smith 11-yard pass from Ron Jaworski (Tony Franklin kick). Buccaneers 17–7.

Third quarter

- PHI – Tony Franklin 42-yard field goal. Buccaneers 17–10.

Fourth quarter

- TB – Jimmie Giles 9-yard pass from Doug Williams (Neil O'Donoghue kick). Buccaneers 24–10.
- PHI – Harold Carmichael 37-yard pass from Ron Jaworski (Tony Franklin kick). Buccaneers 24–17.

Top passers

- PHI – Ron Jaworski – 15/39, 199 yards, 2 TD
- TB – Doug Williams – 7/15, 132 yards, TD, INT

Top rushers

- PHI – Wilbert Montgomery – 13 rushes, 35 yards
- TB – Ricky Bell – 38 rushes, 142 yards, 2 TD

Top receivers

- PHI – Harold Carmichael – 3 receptions, 92 yards, TD
- TB – Jimmie Giles – 3 receptions, 43 yards, TD

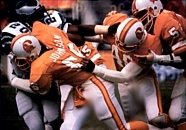
The Buccaneers stopping an Eagles rushing play during the 1979 NFC Divisional Playoff Game.

The Buccaneers won their first playoff game in team history by jumping to a 17–0 lead and holding the Eagles to 48 rushing yards, while running back Ricky Bell recorded 142 rushing yards and 2 touchdowns. This would have been an incredible accomplishment by itself, but it was made historic by the fact that the Bucs had gone 0–26 in their first two seasons just two years ago.

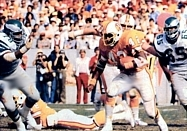
Buccaneers' running back Ricky Bell rushing the ball during the Divisional Playoff Game.

Tampa Bay marched on an 18-play, 80-yard opening drive that took 9:25 off the clock to score on Bell's 4-yard touchdown run. Philadelphia responded with a drive into scoring range, but their drive ended ugly. First they attempted a fake 47-yard field goal, but they failed to snap the ball before the play clock ran out. Then Tony Franklin's 52-yard field goal was no good. Tampa Bay took the ball back and drove to a 10–0 lead on Neil O'Donohue's 40-yard field goal. Then on the Eagles next drive, running back Wilbert Montgomery lost a fumble that nose tackle Randy Crowder recovered on the Philadelphia 5-yard line. Three plays later, Bell scored on a 1-yard fourth down run, increasing the Bucs lead to 17–0 with 5:12 left in the half. Later on, Eagles linebacker Jerry Robinson intercepted a pass from Doug Williams and returned it 37 yards to set up Ron Jaworski's 11-yard touchdown pass to Charlie Smith, making the score 17–7 by halftime.

Philadelphia took the second half kickoff and drove 45 yards to score on Franklin's 42-yard field goal, cutting the deficit to 17–10. This would be the last score until 7:08 remained in the game, when Williams threw a 9-yard touchdown pass to Jimmie Giles. Now down 24–10, Philadelphia made a desperate comeback attempt. First they drove 80 yards in 9 plays and scored on Jaworski's 37-yard bomb to Harold Carmichael. Their defense then forced a punt with 2:11 left in the game, giving them one last chance for a tying touchdown. Jaworski's completions to Carmichael and Smith for gains of 16 and 25 yards moved the ball to the Bucs 45-yard line. But his next four passes were incomplete, enabling Tampa Bay to take over and run out the clock.

This was the first postseason meeting between the Eagles and Buccaneers.

==== AFC: Houston Oilers 17, San Diego Chargers 14 ====
Houston Oilers vs. San Diego Chargers – Game summary

Quarter	1	2	3	4	Total
Oilers	0	10	7	0	17
Chargers	7	0	7	0	14

at San Diego Stadium, San Diego

- Game time: 4:00 p.m. EST
- Game attendance: 51,192
- Referee: Ben Dreith
- TV announcers (NBC): Dick Enberg and Merlin Olsen

Game information

First quarter

- SD – Clarence Williams 1-yard run (Mike Wood kick). Chargers 7–0.

Second quarter

- HOU – Toni Fritsch 26-yard field goal. Chargers 7–3.
- HOU – Boobie Clark 1-yard run (Toni Fritsch kick). Oilers 10–7.

Third quarter

- SD – Lydell Mitchell 8-yard run (Mike Wood kick). Chargers 14–10.
- HOU – Mike Renfro 47-yard pass from Gifford Nielsen (Toni Fritsch kick). Oilers 17–14.

Fourth quarter

- No scoring plays.

Top passers

- HOU – Gifford Nielsen – 10/19, 111 yards, TD, INT
- SD – Dan Fouts – 25/47, 333 yards, 5 INT

Top rushers

- HOU – Rob Carpenter – 18 rushes, 67 yards
- SD – Lydell Mitchell – 8 rushes, 33 yards

Top receivers

- HOU – Mike Renfro – 1 reception, 47 yards, TD
- SD – Charlie Joiner – 4 receptions, 81 yards

The Oilers offense, playing without starting quarterback Dan Pastorini, receiver Ken Burrough, and running back Earl Campbell due to injuries, could only generate 259 yards compared to San Diego's 385. But they still won the game, largely due to the effort of rookie safety Vernon Perry, who set a playoff record with 4 interceptions as the Oilers defeated the Chargers 17–14. In his first career playoff game, Chargers future hall of fame quarterback Dan Fouts threw for 333 yards, but was intercepted 5 times. The Chargers' high powered offense scored on their first possession of the game and of the second half but turnovers prevented further scoring.

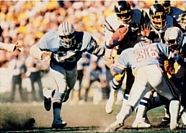
Houston's defensive line blocking a San Diego rushing attempt during the 1979 AFC Divisional Playoff Game.

San Diego took the opening kickoff and started out strong, moving the ball 81 yards in 11 plays. Fouts completed a 34-yard pass to tight end Greg McCrary and a 17-yarder to John Jefferson before Clarence Williams' 1-yard rushing touchdown finished the drive. The Chargers threatened to score again on their next drive, but Perry intercepted a pass at the Houston 18-yard line.

In the second quarter, Perry blocked a field goal attempt and returned the ball 57 yards to the San Diego 28-yard line, setting up Toni Fritsch's 26-yard field goal. On San Diego's next drive, Perry recorded another interception and lateralled the ball to safety Mike Reinfeldt, who gained 7 yards to the Chargers 38. Three plays later, Oilers quarterback Gifford Nielsen rushed 14 yards to the Chargers 4-yard line. San Diego's defense managed to keep them out of the end zone for three plays, but on Fritch's field goal attempt, they were penalized for having 12 men on the field, moving the ball just inches away from the goal line. On fourth and inches with 19 seconds left in the half, Houston coach Bum Phillips decided to gamble and go for the touchdown, a gamble that paid off when Boobie Clark scored on a sweep left to give the Oilers a 10–7 first half lead.

In the third period, Fouts connected with Charlie Joiner for 20 yards and hit tight end Bob Klein for 16, with a roughing the passer penalty turning it into a 31-yard gain. Lydell Mitchell finished the 65-yard drive with an 8-yard touchdown run to give the Chargers a 14–10 lead. However, Houston defensive back J.C. Wilson's interception later gave Houston the ball at the San Diego 44-yard line. Faced with 3rd and 13 two plays later, Nielsen threw a 47-yard touchdown pass to receiver Mike Renfro, putting the Oilers back in front at 17–14. There were still more than 17 minutes left in regulation, but this would be the final score. Perry recorded two more interceptions as the Oilers defense shut down the Chargers offense for the rest of the game.

After the game, it was revealed that the Oilers coaching staff was able to figure out the Chargers' coaches' signs as they signaled the play call from the sideline; this was one reason their defensive backs seemed to always be in the right place at the right time. "We pretty much knew ahead of time when they were going to pass, and where they were going to pass it." said Oilers defensive coordinator Ed Biles. It was a monumental upset against the heavily favored Chargers, who had scored at least 26 points in 10 games during the season and had defeated both eventual Super Bowl teams, the Rams and Steelers, by a combined scoring margin of 75–23.

It was the first AFC playoff game that was a rematch of an earlier AFL championship game.

This was the third postseason meeting between the Oilers and Chargers. Houston won both meetings when both teams were in the AFL.

Previous playoff games
Houston leads 2–0 in all-time playoff games

1960

Los Angeles Chargers 16 @ Houston Oilers 24

1960 AFL Championship Game

1961

Houston Oilers 10 @ San Diego Chargers 3

1961 AFL Championship Game

=== Sunday, December 30, 1979 ===
==== AFC: Pittsburgh Steelers 34, Miami Dolphins 14 ====
Miami Dolphins vs. Pittsburgh Steelers – Game summary

Quarter	1	2	3	4	Total
Dolphins	0	0	7	7	14
Steelers	20	0	7	7	34

at Three Rivers Stadium, Pittsburgh

- Game time: 12:30 p.m. EST
- Game attendance: 50,214
- Referee: Cal Lepore
- TV announcers (NBC): Don Criqui and John Brodie

Game information

First quarter

- PIT – Sidney Thornton 1-yard run (Matt Bahr kick). Steelers 7–0.
- PIT – John Stallworth 17-yard pass from Terry Bradshaw (kick failed). Steelers 13–0.
- PIT – Lynn Swann 20-yard pass from Terry Bradshaw (Matt Bahr kick). Steelers 20–0.

Second quarter

- No scoring plays.

Third quarter

- MIA – Duriel Harris 7-yard pass from Bob Griese (Uwe von Schamann kick). Steelers 20–7.
- PIT – Rocky Bleier 1-yard run (Matt Bahr kick). Steelers 27–7.

Fourth quarter

- PIT – Franco Harris 5-yard run (Matt Bahr kick). Steelers 34–7.
- MIA – Larry Csonka 1-yard run (Uwe von Schamann kick). Steelers 34–14.

Top passers

- MIA – Don Strock – 8/14, 125 yards, INT
- PIT – Terry Bradshaw – 21/31, 230 yards, 2 TD

Top rushers

- MIA – Larry Csonka – 10 rushes, 20 yards, TD
- PIT – Franco Harris – 21 rushes, 83 yards, TD

Top receivers

- MIA – Nat Moore – 5 receptions, 93 yards
- PIT – John Stallworth – 6 receptions, 86 yards, TD

The Steelers scored 20 points in the first quarter and held the Dolphins to 25 rushing yards. Miami future hall of fame running back Larry Csonka was held to just 20 rushing yards on 10 carries in the final game of his career, while Steelers quarterback Terry Bradshaw threw for 230 yards and 2 touchdowns.

On the opening drive of the game, Pittsburgh marched 62 yards in 13 plays to score on running back Sidney Thornton's 1-yard touchdown run. On their second possession, the Steelers advanced another 62 yards in 9 plays, 36 of them on carries by Thornton, to score on wide receiver John Stallworth's 17-yard touchdown reception (although the extra point was blocked). And on their third drive, they moved the ball 56 yards to score on wide receiver Lynn Swann's 20-yard touchdown reception.

In the second quarter, the Dolphins moved the ball 63 yards to the Pittsburgh 6-yard line, but then lost it when a safety blitz by J. T. Thomas forced quarterback Bob Griese to throw a rushed pass that was intercepted by linebacker Dennis Winston. Miami soon got another chance to score when Larry Gordon recovered Thornton's fumble on the Steelers 5, but all this resulted in was a turnover on downs. Faced with 4th and 2, Griese tried to connect with tight end Bruce Hardy in the end zone, but Hardy collided with receiver Nat Moore and the pass fell incomplete. The Steelers had a chance to increase their lead even more right before halftime when they tackled Dolphins punter George Roberts on the Miami 21 before he could make a kick. But Matt Bahr's 30-yard field goal was eliminated by a Pittsburgh holding penalty, which ran off the final seconds of the half.

In the second half, Pittsburgh primarily relied on their rushing game to protect their lead. Despite Miami having the second highest ranked run defense during the season, and an injury that sidelined Thornton in the second half, the Steelers ended up running the ball 40 times during the game, with Franco Harris gaining 83 yards on 21 carries. Miami finally scored in the third quarter after defensive back Don Bessillieu recovered a punt that bounced into the leg of Pittsburgh blocker Dwayne Woodruff on the Steelers 11-yard line, leading to Griese's 7-yard touchdown pass to Duriel Harris. However, the Steelers responded by advancing 69 yards to score on running back Rocky Bleier's 1-yard touchdown. Harris' 5-yard touchdown in the fourth quarter put the game out of reach.

This was the final NFL game for Csonka, as well as the final playoff game for Griese, who completed just 14 of 26 passes for 118 yards and was sacked 8 times before being replaced by Don Strock with 8:55 left in the fourth quarter. Strock actually ended up with more passing yards, going 8/14 for 125 yards and leading the team 76 yards to their final score on a 1-yard Csonka run.

This was the second postseason meeting between the Dolphins and Steelers. Miami won the only prior meeting.

Previous playoff games
Miami leads 1–0 in all-time playoff games

1972

Miami Dolphins 21 @ Pittsburgh Steelers 17

1972 AFC Championship Game

==== NFC: Los Angeles Rams 21, Dallas Cowboys 19 ====
Los Angeles Rams vs. Dallas Cowboys – Game summary

Quarter	1	2	3	4	Total
Rams	0	14	0	7	21
Cowboys	2	3	7	7	19

at Texas Stadium, Irving, Texas

- Game time: 4:00 p.m. EST
- Game attendance: 64,792
- Referee: Jerry Markbreit
- TV announcers (CBS): Vin Scully and George Allen

Game information

First quarter

- DAL – Safety, Randy White tackled Vince Ferragamo in the end zone. Cowboys 2–0.

Second quarter

- LA – Wendell Tyler 32-yard pass from Vince Ferragamo (Frank Corral kick). Rams 7–2.
- DAL – Rafael Septién 33-yard field goal. Rams 7–5.
- LA – Ron Smith 43-yard pass from Vince Ferragamo (Frank Corral kick). Rams 14–5.

Third quarter

- DAL – Ron Springs 1-yard run (Rafael Septién kick). Rams 14–12.

Fourth quarter

- DAL – Jay Saldi 2-yard pass from Roger Staubach (Rafael Septién kick). Cowboys 19–14.
- LA – Billy Waddy 50-yard pass from Vince Ferragamo (Frank Corral kick). Rams 21–19.

Top passers

- LA – Vince Ferragamo – 9/21, 210 yards, 3 TD, 2 INT
- DAL – Roger Staubach – 12/28, 124 yards, TD, INT

Top rushers

- LA – Wendell Tyler – 19 rushes, 82 yards
- DAL – Tony Dorsett – 19 rushes, 87 yards

Top receivers

- LA – Billy Waddy – 3 receptions, 97 yards, TD
- DAL – Drew Pearson – 3 receptions, 61 yards

The Cowboys had handled the Rams in the last two meetings between the teams, soundly defeating an injured Los Angeles team during the regular season 30–6 after shutting them out in last season's NFC title game 28–0. Dallas came into this game after an impressive win against the Washington Redskins in the last game of the regular season in which quarterback Roger Staubach, already famous for his fourth quarter comebacks, added one more to his resume by rallying the Cowboys back from a 34–21 fourth quarter deficit to a 35–34 win. But this day belonged to the Rams as quarterback Vince Ferragamo led them to a victory by throwing for three touchdown passes, the last one with 2:06 left in the game.

The game started out as a defensive struggle with Dallas punting on their first three drives and Los Angeles punting on their first two. On the Rams third possession, they started out on their own 12-yard line and a penalty pushed them back 5 yards to the 7. On second, Ferragamo dropped back into the end zone, scrambled forward, then tripped and fell over his own feet still in the end zone, where Randy White fell on him for a safety, giving Dallas a 2–0 lead. The Cowboys started their next drive with great field position on their own 46-yard line after the free kick, but two plays later, quarterback Staubach's pass was intercepted by defensive back Eddie Brown and returned 21 yards to the Dallas 32. The Rams also proved unable to take advantage of good field position, as their ensuing drive ended with a missed 44-yard field goal attempt by Frank Corral.

The second quarter began with more punting from both teams, but eventually the Rams offense managed to get on track, driving 93 yards to score on Ferragamo's 32-yard touchdown pass to running back Wendell Tyler, making the score 7–2. Dallas struck back with Staubach completing a 17-yard pass to Drew Pearson and a 16-yarder to tight end Billy Joe Dupree, moving the ball close enough for Rafael Septién to kick a 33-yard field goal and cut the score to 7–5. As time was running out in the half, Ferragamo managed to get the Rams to the Cowboys 43-yard line. Just 11 seconds before halftime he fired a pass to Ron Smith in the end zone just before being leveled by White. Smith made a leaping catch between two defenders for a touchdown, giving the Rams a 14–5 lead going into halftime.

Cowboys DB Dennis Thurman gave his team an early second half scoring opportunity, intercepting Ferragamo on the Rams opening drive and returning the ball 18 yards to the Los Angeles 32-yard line. But their offense could not move the ball and ended up with a punt. Once again the "Doomsday Defense" kept the Rams in check, and after a Los Angeles punt, Dallas took the ball back on their own 46. On the next play, Staubach threw to Pearson for a 29-yard gain. Then from the Los Angeles 25, they tried a halfback option play. It seemed to work at first, with running back Ron Springs throwing a touchdown pass to Tony Hill, but officials ruled he didn't have both feet in bounds before stepping out of the back of the end zone. Then Staubach missed on a pass to Tony Dorsett in the end zone. However, the Rams were flagged for pass interference, moving the ball to the 1-yard line, and Springs ran the ball in for a score on the next play, cutting the score to 14–12. Dallas' situation got even better from there as safety Cliff Harris intercepted a pass from Ferragamo and returned it 22 yards to his 43-yard line.

After the turnover, Dallas scored on Staubach's 2-yard touchdown toss to tight end Jay Saldi, giving the team a 19–14 lead with 12:46 left in regulation. Both teams had some success moving on the ball on the next few drives, but failed to score on each one. The Rams responded with a drive to the Cowboys 32-yard line, but turned the ball over on downs while trying to convert a 4th and 8. On Dallas' first play after that, Tony Dorsett ran the ball 26 yards to the Rams 42. But Dallas could go no further and ended up punting. Then Ferragamo connected with Billy Waddy for a 36-yard completion on the Cowboys 44, only to have a holding penalty two plays later push them back into their own territory and end punting again.

Dallas took the ball back on their own 21 with 2:45 left, needing only to run out the clock to win the game. On first down, Robert Newhouse was dropped for a 1-yard loss. Then they tried a screen pass to Hill, but only gained 1-yard. On a third down pass play, Staubach tried to scramble, but was stuffed for no gain and a punt followed. The Rams had used all their timeouts on the possession, but got the ball back at midfield with 2:16 left in the game. On their first play, Ferragamo threw a pass over the middle to Waddy, who caught the ball at the 28 and took off to the end zone to give the Rams a 21–19 lead.

Although Dorsett rushed for 12 yards on the first play of the Cowboys' ensuing possession, Staubach was unable to engineer a late fourth-quarter comeback like the ones that made him famous throughout his career. After two incompletions, the Rams defense pressured the Dallas quarterback to throw a pass illegally to an ineligible receiver, guard Herbert Scott, on third down, the last pass of his career to be caught. On fourth down, he overthrew Drew Pearson. The Rams got the ball back on the Cowboys 33 with 1:07 left. Dallas had enough timeouts left to force the Rams into a fourth down situation with just 13 seconds left to go. However, Rams defensive back Nolan Cromwell, who was the holder on special teams, ran 7 yards for a first down on a fake field goal play as time expired in the game.

Ferragamo completed only 9 of 21 passes and was intercepted twice, but still threw for 210 yards and three touchdowns. Staubach fared no better, finishing his final game 12/28 for 124 yards, with one touchdown and one interception. Tyler rushed for 82 yards and caught two passes for 40. Waddy caught 3 passes for 97 yards and a score, and had a 3-yard carry. Dorsett rushed for 87 yards.

This was the fifth postseason meeting between the Cowboys and Rams [not counting the final NFL Playoff Bowl in Miami in January 1970, at the end of the 1969 season], and second consecutive. Dallas previously won three of the previous four meetings.

This was the first postseason contest for referee Jerry Markbreit, who entered the NFL as a line judge in 1976, then was promoted to referee the next season following the retirement of two-time Super Bowl referee Tommy Bell. Markbreit was selected for an on-field playoff assignment in each of the next 19 seasons, officiating 23 postseason contests before retiring after the 1998 season. Through the 2024 season, he is the only referee to call four Super Bowls (XVII, XXI, XXVI, XXIX).

Previous playoff games
Dallas leads 3–1 in all-time playoff games

1973

Los Angeles Rams 16 @ Dallas Cowboys 27

1973 NFC Divisional playoffs

1975

Dallas Cowboys 37 @ Los Angeles Rams 7

1975 NFC Championship Game

1976

Los Angeles Rams 14 @ Dallas Cowboys 12

1976 NFC Divisional playoffs

1978

Dallas Cowboys 28 @ Los Angeles Rams 0

1978 NFC Championship Game

== Conference championships ==
=== Sunday, January 6, 1980 ===
==== AFC: Pittsburgh Steelers 27, Houston Oilers 13 ====
Houston Oilers vs. Pittsburgh Steelers – Game summary

Quarter	1	2	3	4	Total
Oilers	7	3	0	3	13
Steelers	3	14	0	10	27

at Three Rivers Stadium, Pittsburgh

- Game time: 1:00 p.m. EST
- Game weather: 26 °F (−3 °C), cloudy
- Game attendance: 50,475
- Referee: Jim Tunney
- TV announcers (NBC): Dick Enberg and Merlin Olsen

Game information

First quarter

- HOU – Vernon Perry 75-yard interception return (Toni Fritsch kick). Oilers 7–0.
- PIT – Matt Bahr 21-yard field goal. Oilers 7–3.

Second quarter

- HOU – Toni Fritsch 21-yard field goal. Oilers 10–3.
- PIT – Bennie Cunningham 16-yard pass from Terry Bradshaw (Matt Bahr kick). Tied 10–10.
- PIT – John Stallworth 20-yard pass from Terry Bradshaw (Matt Bahr kick). Steelers 17–10.

Third quarter

- No scoring plays.

Fourth quarter

- HOU – Toni Fritsch 23-yard field goal. Steelers 17–13.
- PIT – Matt Bahr 39-yard field goal. Steelers 20–13.
- PIT – Rocky Bleier 4-yard run (Matt Bahr kick). Steelers 27–13.

Top passers

- HOU – Dan Pastorini – 19/28, 203 yards, INT
- PIT – Terry Bradshaw – 18/30, 219 yards, 2 TD, INT

Top rushers

- HOU – Earl Campbell – 17 rushes, 15 yards
- PIT – Franco Harris – 21 rushes, 85 yards

Top receivers

- HOU – Tim Wilson – 7 receptions, 60 yards
- PIT – John Stallworth – 4 receptions, 45 yards, TD

The Steelers held the Oilers to only 24 rushing yards, but were also aided by a controversial non-touchdown call to come away with a 27–13 win. Houston jumped to a 7–0 lead with just 2:30 into the game when Vernon Perry returned an interception 75 yards for a touchdown. Then after the teams exchanged field goals, Pittsburgh quarterback Terry Bradshaw completed two touchdown passes, a 16-yarder to tight end Bennie Cunningham and a 20-yard one to wide receiver John Stallworth.

With the Steelers leading 17–10, the controversial play occurred during the last seconds of the third quarter after the Oilers advanced to the Pittsburgh 6-yard line. With a chance to tie the game, Quarterback Dan Pastorini threw a pass to Mike Renfro at the back of the end zone, and Renfro appeared to have caught it for a touchdown with both feet in bounds before he fell out of the end zone. TV replays suggested a catch for a touchdown. Despite this, the officials ruled the pass incomplete, saying that Renfro did not have complete control of the ball before going out of bounds. The Oilers then had to settle for a 23-yard field goal. The Steelers scored 10 unanswered points in the fourth quarter to clinch the victory. A 78-yard drive ended with a field goal and running back Rocky Bleier scored on a 4-yard rushing touchdown. Steelers running back Franco Harris rushed for 85 yards and caught 6 passes for 50 yards. Houston running back Earl Campbell, the NFL's leading rusher during the season, finished the game with just 15 yards on 17 carries.

This was the second postseason meeting between the Oilers and Steelers. Pittsburgh won the only previous meeting last season.

Previous playoff games
Pittsburgh leads 1–0 in all-time playoff games

1978

Houston Oilers 5 @ Pittsburgh Steelers 34

1978 AFC Championship Game

==== NFC: Los Angeles Rams 9, Tampa Bay Buccaneers 0 ====
Los Angeles Rams vs. Tampa Bay Buccaneers – Game summary

Quarter	1	2	3	4	Total
Rams	0	6	0	3	9
Buccaneers	0	0	0	0	0

at Tampa Stadium, Tampa, Florida

- Game time: 5:00 p.m. EST
- Game weather: 54 °F (12 °C), clear
- Game attendance: 72,033
- Referee: Pat Haggerty
- TV announcers (CBS): Pat Summerall and Tom Brookshier

Game information

First quarter

- No scoring plays.

Second quarter

- LA – Frank Corral 19-yard field goal. Rams 3–0.
- LA – Frank Corral 21-yard field goal. Rams 6–0.

Third quarter

- No scoring plays.

Fourth quarter

- LA – Frank Corral 23-yard field goal. Rams 9–0.

Top passers

- LA – Vince Ferragamo – 12/23, 163 yards
- TB – Mike Rae – 2/13, 42 yards

Top rushers

- LA – Cullen Bryant – 18 rushes, 106 yards
- TB – Ricky Bell – 20 rushes, 59 yards

Top receivers

- LA – Preston Dennard – 3 receptions, 56 yards
- TB – Larry Mucker – 1 receptions, 42 yards

This was the first postseason meeting between the Rams and Buccaneers.

In a defensive battle in which the Rams squandered numerous scoring opportunities, Rams kicker Frank Corral kicked 3 field goals to win the game. Los Angeles was able to record 369 yards of total offense, while running backs Cullen Bryant and Wendell Tyler rushed for 106 and 86 yards, respectively. Meanwhile, the Buccaneers only had 177 total offensive yards, including 92 rushing yards and 85 passing yards. Tampa Bay starting quarterback Doug Williams completed just 2 of 13 passes before suffering a game-ending torn bicep injury. Most of Tampa Bay's passing yards came from a 42-yard halfback option pass from Jerry Eckwood to wide receiver Larry Mucker in the fourth quarter. During the game, two touchdowns were nullified by penalties, one by each team: a four-yard run by Bryant and a 27-yard reception by Buccaneers' tight end Jimmie Giles.

On their second drive of the game, LA drove to the Bucs 18-yard line, but Tyler lost a fumble due to a hit by Wally Chambers and linebacker Richard Wood recovered it. On their next drive, they drove 68 yards, including a 35-yard completion from Vince Ferragamo to Preston Dennard, to the Buccaneers 1-yard line where Corral made a 19-yard field goal. In the second quarter, they drove 58 yards and scored another short Corral field goal to take a 6–0 halftime lead. In the third quarter, the Rams appeared to score on a 20-yard pass, but the reception was ruled incomplete and Corral missed a 37-yard field goal on the next play. In the fourth quarter, Rams safety Eddie Brown's 16-yard punt return to midfield set up a 23-yard field goal from Corral for the final score of the game.

This was the first conference championship game in NFL history without a touchdown scored by either team.

== Super Bowl XIV: Pittsburgh Steelers 31, Los Angeles Rams 19 ==
Super Bowl XIV – Los Angeles Rams vs. Pittsburgh Steelers – Game summary

Quarter	1	2	3	4	Total
Rams (NFC)	7	6	6	0	19
Steelers (AFC)	3	7	7	14	31

at Rose Bowl, Pasadena, California

- Date: January 20, 1980
- Game time: 6:00 p.m., EST
- Game attendance: 103,985
- Referee: Fred Silva
- TV announcers (CBS): Pat Summerall and Tom Brookshier

This was the first Super Bowl meeting between the Rams and Steelers.
