= Bruce Radford =

American football player (1955–2011)

No. 78, 79
- Position: Defensive end

Personal information
- Born: October 5, 1955; Pineville, Louisiana, U.S.
- Died: May 23, 2011 (aged 55); New Orleans, Louisiana, U.S.
- Listed height: 6 ft 5 in (1.96 m)
- Listed weight: 257 lb (117 kg)

Career information
- High school: Tioga (LA)
- College: Grambling State
- NFL draft: 1979: 3rd round, 77th overall pick

Career history
- Denver Broncos (1979); Tampa Bay Buccaneers (1980); St. Louis Cardinals (1981)

Career NFL statistics
- Sacks: 1
- Fumble recoveries: 3
- Stats at Pro Football Reference

Bruce Radford (October 5, 1955 – May 23, 2011) was an American professional football defensive end. He played for the Denver Broncos in 1979, the Tampa Bay Buccaneers in 1980 and for the St. Louis Cardinals in 1981.

He died on May 23, 2011, in New Orleans, Louisiana at age 55.
