= Craig Morton =

American football player (1943–2026)

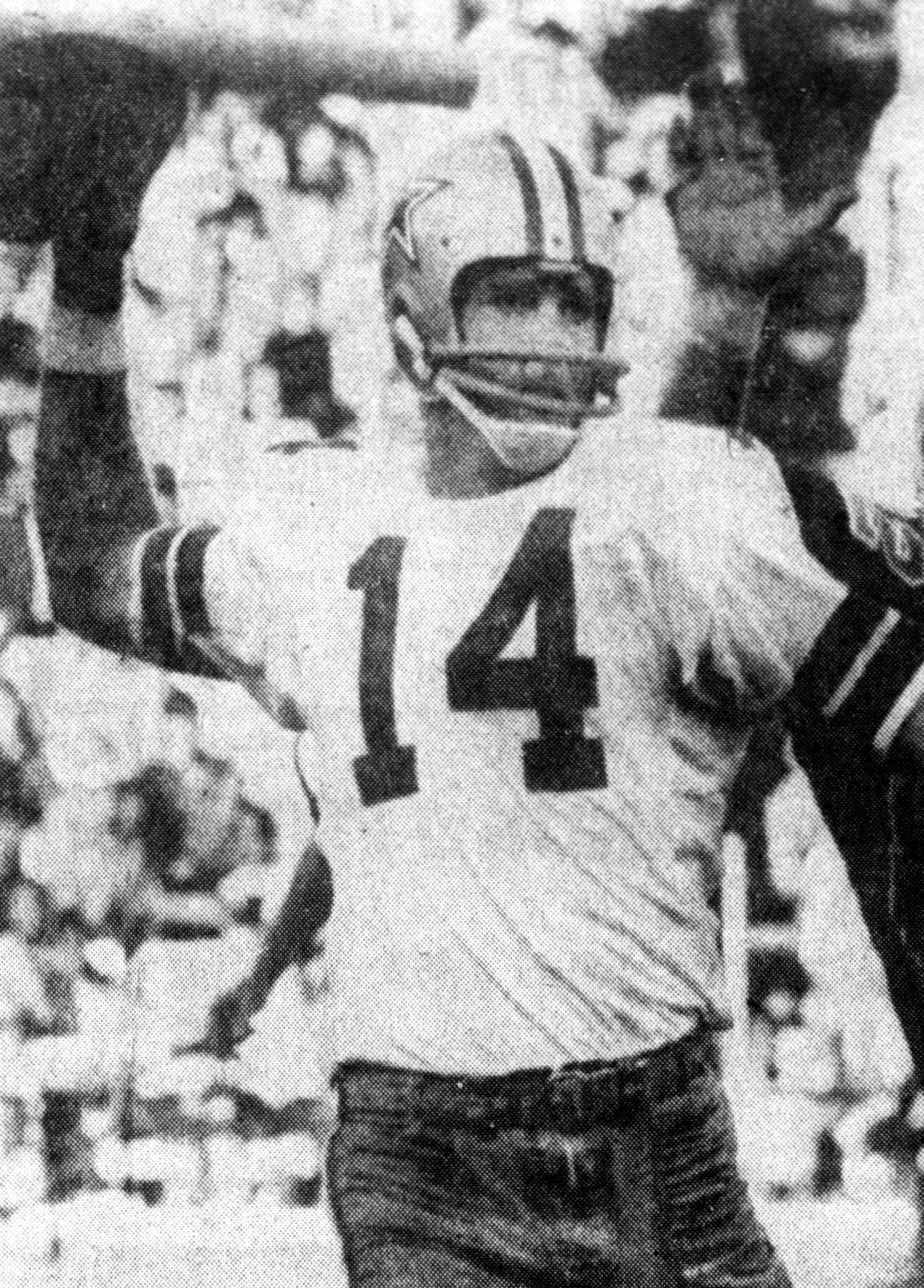
- Morton with the Dallas Cowboys, c. 1969

No. 14, 15, 7
- Position: Quarterback

Personal information
- Born: February 5, 1943; Flint, Michigan, U.S.
- Died: May 9, 2026 (aged 83); Greenbrae, California, U.S.
- Listed height: 6 ft 4 in (1.93 m)
- Listed weight: 214 lb (97 kg)

Career information
- High school: Campbell (Campbell, California)
- College: California
- NFL draft: 1965: 1st round, 5th overall pick
- AFL draft: 1965: 10th round, 75th overall pick

Career history
- Dallas Cowboys (1965–1973); New York Giants (1974–1976); Denver Broncos (1977–1982)

Awards and highlights
- Super Bowl champion (VI); NFL Comeback Player of the Year (1977); AFC Offensive Player of the Year (1977); Denver Broncos Ring of Fame; Pop Warner Trophy (1964); First-team All-American (1964); 2× First-team All-Coast (1963, 1964)

Career NFL statistics
- Passing attempts: 3,786
- Passing completions: 2,053
- Completion percentage: 54.2%
- TD–INT: 183–187
- Passing yards: 27,908
- Passer rating: 73.5
- Rushing yards: 627
- Rushing touchdowns: 12
- Stats at Pro Football Reference
- College Football Hall of Fame

Larry Craig Morton (February 5, 1943 – May 9, 2026) was an American professional football quarterback who played in the National Football League (NFL) for 18 seasons, primarily with the Dallas Cowboys and Denver Broncos. He played college football for the California Golden Bears, earning the Pop Warner Trophy and first-team All-American honors in 1964.

Morton was selected by the Cowboys fifth overall in the 1965 NFL draft, where he spent his first nine seasons and led the team to an appearance in Super Bowl V. After leaving the Cowboys due to a quarterback controversy with Roger Staubach, Morton was a member of the New York Giants for three seasons. He played his final six seasons with the Broncos, winning NFL Comeback Player of the Year and AFC Offensive Player of the Year in 1977 en route to a Super Bowl XII appearance. Morton was the first quarterback to start in the Super Bowl with more than one franchise, as well as the only quarterback to start for multiple franchises in their Super Bowl debut. He was inducted to the College Football Hall of Fame in 1992.

== Early life ==
Morton was a 1961 graduate of Campbell High School in Campbell, California, where he received All-state honors in football, baseball, and basketball. In football, he received honors as a senior.

As a pitcher, Morton received offers from major league teams to play in their minor league systems. Morton was voted Northern California high school athlete of the year as a quarterback and was selected to play in the annual California Shrine High School football game.

== College career ==
Morton played college football at the University of California, Berkeley, under head coach Marv Levy and assistant coach Bill Walsh, both future NFL head coaches and members of the Pro Football Hall of Fame. Morton became the starter in the sixth game of his sophomore season in 1962. Back then his nickname was "Big Hummer" and his production dominated the Golden Bears offense output.

As a sophomore in 1962, he only played in the last five games because of a knee injury he suffered in practice while returning punts. He still managed 905 passing yards, a 54% completion rate, and 9 touchdowns. As a junior in 1963 he already owned most of Cal Berkley's all-time quarterback records.

In his three seasons as a starter at Cal, he never played on a winning team. He completed 185 of 308 passes for 2,121 yards and 13 touchdowns in his senior season in 1964, but even with a losing 3–7 record, he was recognized for his talent and contributions by being named first-team All-American over other winning quarterbacks. He also received the W. J. Voit Memorial Trophy, given to the best player on the Pacific Coast and the Pop Warner Trophy, given to the best senior player. In the balloting for the Heisman Trophy won by John Huarte of Notre Dame, Morton was seventh, ahead of Joe Namath of Alabama and Gale Sayers of Kansas.

Morton finished his college career with 4,501 passing yards (a Pac-8 record), and most of Cal's All-time passing records, including:

- Touchdown passes in one game (5)
- Touchdown passes in a season (13)
- Touchdown passes in a career (36)
- Total yards in one game (285)
- Passing yards in a career (4,501)
- Passing yards in a season (2,121)
- Most passing completions and attempts in one game
- Most passing completions and attempts in a season
- Most passing completions and attempts in one game

In 1964 as the starting quarterback for the West, he faced Roger Staubach in the East–West Shrine Game, which was a sign of things to come.

He was later inducted into the College Football Hall of Fame, the Cal Athletic Hall of Fame, and the San Jose Sports Hall of Fame.

== Professional career ==
=== Dallas Cowboys ===
Morton was selected by the Dallas Cowboys in the first round with the fifth overall pick in the 1965 NFL draft. He spent his first four seasons as the backup for Don Meredith, but still received opportunities to play due to periodic injuries suffered by Meredith.

In 1969, he became the starter at quarterback over Roger Staubach, after Meredith's unexpected retirement. Morton dislocated a right finger in preseason and had to miss the season opener. In the next three games, he had a 71.1% passing percentage and was seen as having a promising future as the starter. In the fourth game against the Atlanta Falcons, he suffered a separated right shoulder after being tackled by Tommy Nobis. In the next contest against the Philadelphia Eagles, he set club records with 10 consecutive passes and 5 touchdown passes in a single game, although he sat out most of the second half. He did not miss any games because of his shoulder, but his effectiveness decreased to 53.6% the rest of the season, as he caused more damage. He had surgery on his right shoulder during the offseason.

In 1970, although he was bothered most of the season recuperating from his right shoulder surgery, he finished third in the NFL in passer rating with 89.8. He also led the Cowboys to Super Bowl V, where the team lost 16–13 to the Baltimore Colts. He had surgery on his right elbow during the offseason.

In 1971, head coach Tom Landry created one of the most famous quarterback controversies in NFL history, when he began alternating Morton with Staubach as the starting quarterback, reaching its extreme against the Chicago Bears, where they alternated between plays. After this famous game, Landry settled on Staubach and the Cowboys went on a 10-game winning streak that included a 24–3 victory in Super Bowl VI over the Miami Dolphins.

In 1972, Staubach suffered a separated right shoulder in the third preseason game against the Los Angeles Rams and Morton was named the starter. Although Staubach was activated in the fifth game of the season, by then Morton was entrenched at quarterback. For the first time since 1969, his arm had regained its strength, helping him register 185 completions (club record) out of 339 attempts (54.6%), 2,396 yards (fifth in the league), 15 touchdowns, and 21 interceptions. He was replaced late in the third quarter of the first-round playoff game against the San Francisco 49ers. Staubach entered an apparently hopeless situation trailing 28–13 and threw two touchdown passes in the last 90 seconds to win the game 30–28, eventually sealing Morton's fate with the team.

On March 18, 1974, he was selected by the Birmingham Americans in the second round (18th overall) of the WFL Pro Draft. On April 10, after repeatedly asking for a trade, Morton signed a contract with the Houston Texans of the World Football League for their 1975 season. He never played a down with them; he was traded to the New York Giants six games into the 1974 season, in exchange for their number-one draft choice in 1975 (#2-Randy White) and a second-round draft choice in 1976 (#40-Jim Jensen).

=== New York Giants ===
After acquiring Morton, the Giants traded their starting quarterback Norm Snead to the San Francisco 49ers in exchange for a third-round draft choice in 1975 and a fourth in 1976. During his time with the Giants, he struggled along with the team, and "felt the vocal wrath of the fans." He was traded to the Denver Broncos in 1977 in exchange for quarterback Steve Ramsey and a fifth-round draft choice in 1978 (#137-Brian DeRoo). In his 34 career games with the Giants over three seasons, he had an 8–25–0 (.242) record, throwing for a total of 5,734 yards, 29 touchdowns, 49 interceptions, and a 52.1 completion percentage.

=== Denver Broncos ===
At age 34, Morton revived his career with the Broncos, finishing the season as the second-rated passer in the AFC. Morton was named the NFL Comeback Player of the Year for 1977 and selected All-AFC by the Sporting News. Although he suffered in the playoffs from a swollen left hip that needed to be drained, he overcame the injury to become the first NFL quarterback to start the Super Bowl for two different teams (Dallas in V and Denver in XII), a feat only equaled by Kurt Warner, Peyton Manning, and Tom Brady. Morton is also the only quarterback to have started for two different teams' inaugural Super Bowl appearances. Unlike Warner, Manning, and Brady, however, Morton would not win a Super Bowl as a starter. He threw a franchise playoff record four interceptions in Denver's defeat against his former team, the Cowboys, which led to him being pulled in favor of Norris Weese.

Morton's best statistical season came in his penultimate 17th season in 1981, when he threw for 3,195 yards and 21 touchdowns and had a 90.5 passer rating. He was a downfield passer not known for his mobility, but is one of the all-time leaders in yards per completion. He briefly held the record for the most consecutive passes completed. His 8.5 yards per attempt that season remains a Broncos franchise record, as do his 54 sacks, and two games where he was sacked seven times each (later matched by John Elway and Tim Tebow). He was sacked 54 times in 1981, a team record for 41 years, and still among the highest amount of sacks suffered by any quarterback in one season past the age of 35 in NFL history.

Morton wore number 7 for the Broncos and retired just before the arrival of celebrated rookie John Elway in 1983, who wore the same number and in whose honor it was retired. Morton remains the third all-time passing yards leader in franchise history with 11,895 and his regular-season record was 50 wins and 28 losses in five seasons.

In 1986, Morton was inducted to the Colorado Sports Hall of Fame. He was inducted into the Denver Broncos' Ring of Fame in 1988.

== NFL career statistics ==
=== Regular season ===
Year	Team	Games		Passing						Rushing			
Year	Team	GP	GS	Comp	Att	Yards	TD	Int	Rate	Att	Yds	Avg	TD
1965	DAL	4	1	17	34	173	2	4	45.0	3	−8	−2.7	0
1966	DAL	6	0	13	27	225	3	1	98.5	7	50	7.1	0
1967	DAL	9	3	69	137	978	10	10	67.7	15	42	2.8	0
1968	DAL	13	1	44	85	752	4	6	68.4	4	28	7	2
1969	DAL	13	13	162	302	2,619	21	15	85.4	16	62	3.9	1
1970	DAL	12	11	102	207	1,819	15	7	89.8	16	37	2.3	0
1971	DAL	10	4	78	143	1,131	7	8	73.5	4	9	2.2	1
1972	DAL	14	14	185	339	2,396	15	21	65.9	8	26	3.2	2
1973	DAL	14	0	13	32	174	3	1	76.8	1	0	0.0	0
1974	DAL	6	0	2	2	12	0	0	91.7	1	0	0.0	0
1974	NYG	8	7	122	237	1,510	9	13	61.3	4	5	1.2	0
1975	NYG	14	14	186	363	2,359	11	16	63.6	22	72	3.3	0
1976	NYG	12	12	153	284	1,865	9	20	55.6	15	48	3.2	0
1977	DEN	14	14	131	254	1,929	14	8	82.0	31	125	4.0	4
1978	DEN	14	13	146	267	1,802	11	8	77.0	17	71	4.2	0
1979	DEN	14	10	204	370	2,626	16	19	70.6	23	13	0.6	1
1980	DEN	12	9	183	301	2,150	12	13	77.8	21	29	1.4	1
1981	DEN	15	15	225	376	3,195	21	14	90.5	8	18	2.2	0
1982	DEN	3	3	18	26	193	0	3	51.1	1	0	0.0	0
Total		207	144	2,053	3,786	27,908	183	187	73.5	215	627	2.9	12

=== Postseason ===
Year	Team	Games		Passing						Rushing				
Year	Team	GP	GS	Record	Comp	Att	Yards	TD	Int	Rate	Att	Yds	Avg	TD
1967	DAL	1	0	–	1	3	13	0	1	8.3	0	0	0.0	0
1968	DAL	1	0	–	9	23	163	1	1	60.6	2	14	7.0	0
1969	DAL	1	1	0–1	8	24	92	0	2	11.1	4	12	3.0	1
1970	DAL	3	3	2–1	23	66	266	2	4	32.8	4	4	1.0	0
1972	DAL	2	1	1–0	8	21	96	1	2	29.2	1	2	2.0	0
1973	DAL	2	0	–	0	0	0	0	0	0.0	0	0	0.0	0
1977	DEN	3	3	2–1	25	58	427	4	5	55.7	7	-4	-0.6	0
1978	DEN	1	1	0–1	3	5	34	0	0	80.4	0	0	0.0	0
1979	DEN	1	1	0–1	14	27	144	1	1	64.4	2	0	0.0	0
Career		15	10	5–5	91	227	1,235	9	16	42.0	20	28	1.4	1

=== Super Bowl ===
Year	SB	Team	Opp.	Passing								Rushing				Result
Year	SB	Team	Opp.	Cmp	Att	Pct	Yds	Y/A	TD	Int	Rtg	Att	Yds	Y/A	TD	Result
1970	V	DAL	BAL	12	26	46.1	127	4.9	1	3	34.1	1	2	2.0	0	L 16–13
1977	XII	DEN	DAL	4	15	26.7	39	2.6	0	4	0.0	0	0	0.0	0	L 27–10
Career				16	41	39.0	166	4.1	1	7	20.0	1	2	2.0	0	W−L 0–2

== Coaching career, later life, and death ==
Following his playing career, Morton served as head coach for the Denver Gold of the United States Football League (USFL). He was a voter in the Harris Interactive College Football Poll, a component of college football's now-defunct Bowl Championship Series.

In 2008, he co-authored a book with Denver Post writer Adrian Dater entitled "Then Morton Said to Elway..." - The Best Denver Broncos Stories Ever Told. The book was published by Triumph Books.

Morton died in a hospital in Greenbrae, California, on May 9, 2026, at the age of 83.
