= Fred Steinfort =

German gridiron football player (born 1952)

No. 4, 1, 19, 5
- Position: Placekicker

Personal information
- Born: November 3, 1952 (age 74); Wetter, West Germany
- Listed height: 5 ft 11 in (1.80 m)
- Listed weight: 180 lb (82 kg)

Career information
- High school: Brighton (MA)
- College: Boston College
- NFL draft: 1976: 5th round, 146th overall pick

Career history
- Oakland Raiders (1976); Atlanta Falcons (1977–1978); Denver Broncos (1979–1981); Buffalo Bills (1983); New England Patriots (1983)

Awards and highlights
- Super Bowl champion (XI); PFW Golden Toe Award (1980)

Career NFL statistics
- Field goals made: 63
- Field goals attempted: 114
- Field goal %: 55.3
- Longest field goal: 57
- Stats at Pro Football Reference

Friedrich W. "Fred" Steinfort (born November 3, 1952) is a German-American former professional football placekicker in the National Football League (NFL) who played for five different teams from (1976–1983). He played college football at Boston College.

Steinfort's family immigrated to the United States from Germany in 1965.

When Steinfort won the Oakland Raiders' kicking job just before the start of the 1976 NFL season, he sent the NFL's current all-time leading scorer, George Blanda with 2,002 points, into retirement. In 1979, when he assumed the same role with the Denver Broncos, it was Jim Turner, at that time the NFL's third-leading scorer with 1,439 points that he displaced.

Fred Steinfort played for five teams in seven seasons.
