= Vince Kinney =

American football player (born 1956)

No. 84
- Position: Wide receiver

Personal information
- Born: March 17, 1956 (age 70); Baltimore, Maryland, U.S.
- Listed height: 6 ft 2 in (1.88 m)
- Listed weight: 190 lb (86 kg)

Career information
- High school: Calvert Hall College (Towson, Maryland)
- College: Maryland (1974–1977)
- NFL draft: 1978: 10th round, 277th overall pick

Career history
- Denver Broncos (1978–1979); Washington Federals (1983)

Career NFL statistics
- Games played: 23
- Stats at Pro Football Reference

Vincent Marc Kinney (born March 17, 1956) is an American former professional football player who was a wide receiver for the Denver Broncos of the National Football League (NFL). He played college football for the Maryland Terrapins.
