= Don Latimer =

American football player (born 1955)

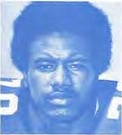
- Latimer in 1976

No. 72
- Position: Nose tackle

Personal information
- Born: March 1, 1955 (age 71); Fort Pierce, Florida, U.S.
- Listed height: 6 ft 3 in (1.91 m)
- Listed weight: 259 lb (117 kg)

Career information
- High school: Fort Pierce (FL) Central
- College: Miami (FL)
- NFL draft: 1978: 1st round, 27th overall pick

Career history
- Denver Broncos (1978–1983)

Awards and highlights
- PFWA All-Rookie Team (1978); Second-team All-American (1977)

Career NFL statistics
- Sacks: 8
- Fumble recoveries: 2
- Interceptions: 1
- Stats at Pro Football Reference

Donald Bertsom Latimer (born March 1, 1955) is an American former professional football player who was a nose tackle for the Denver Broncos of the National Football League (NFL) in the late 1970s and early 1980s.

Latimer was born and raised in Fort Pierce, Florida. He played high school football at Fort Pierce Central High School. Latimer attended the University of Miami, where he played football as a defensive lineman in the mid-1970s.

Latimer was picked in the first round (27th overall) in the 1978 NFL draft by the Denver Broncos, where he played six seasons. In 1983, he signed a contract with the Jacksonville Bulls, franchise of the United States Football League (USFL).

His son, Zach Latimer, was a linebacker for the University of Oklahoma.
