= Larry Evans (American football) =

American football player (born 1952)

No. 56
- Position: Linebacker

Personal information
- Born: July 11, 1952 (age 74); Biloxi, Mississippi, U.S.
- Listed height: 6 ft 2 in (1.88 m)
- Listed weight: 216 lb (98 kg)

Career information
- High school: Biloxi
- College: Mississippi College
- NFL draft: 1976: 14th round, 390th overall pick

Career history
- Denver Broncos (1976–1982); San Diego Chargers (1983)

Career NFL statistics
- Sacks: 4.5
- Fumble recoveries: 4
- Interceptions: 3
- Stats at Pro Football Reference

Lawrence Eugene Evans (born July 11, 1953) is a former linebacker of the Denver Broncos. He played for the Broncos from 1976 to 1982. He was drafted by the Denver Broncos in the 14th round (#390) in the 1976 NFL draft. He played for the Broncos during their run to Super Bowl XII. During his career he picked off three passes and recovered four fumbles. He currently resides in a suburb of Denver, Colorado.
