= Rob Nairne =

American football player (born 1954)

No. 58, 66, 55
- Position: Linebacker

Personal information
- Born: March 24, 1954 (age 72); Redding, California, U.S.
- Listed height: 6 ft 4 in (1.93 m)
- Listed weight: 223 lb (101 kg)

Career information
- High school: Ferndale (CA)
- College: Oregon State
- NFL draft: 1977: undrafted

Career history
- Denver Broncos (1977–1980); New Orleans Saints (1981–1983)

Career NFL statistics
- Sacks: 5
- Fumble recoveries: 4
- Interceptions: 3
- Stats at Pro Football Reference

Robert C. Nairne (born March 24, 1954) is an American former professional football player who was a linebacker for seven seasons in the National Football League (NFL) from 1977 to 1983. He played college football for the Oregon State Beavers.

== General references ==
Rob Nairne Past Stats, Statistics, History, and Awards - databaseFootball.com
