= Marv Braden =

American football and lacrosse coach (1938–2022)

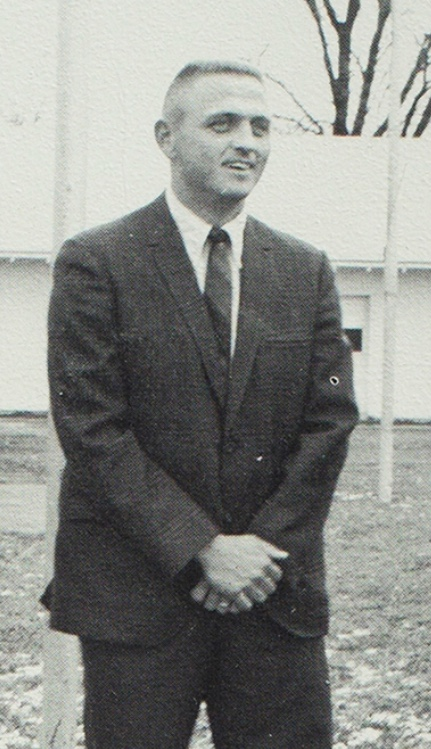
- Braden from the 1968 Echo

Biographical details
- Born: January 25, 1938; Kansas City, Missouri, U.S.
- Died: March 14, 2022 (aged 84); Kansas City, Missouri, U.S.

Playing career

Football
- 1956–1959: Southwest Missouri State

Coaching career (HC unless noted)

Football
- 1960: Missouri (GA)
- 1961: Missouri (assistant)
- 1962–1964: Lafayette (DC)
- 1965–1966: Parsons (DC)
- 1967–1968: Northeast Missouri State
- 1969–1972: United States International
- 1973: Iowa State (DC/LB)
- 1974–1975: SMU (OC)
- 1976: Michigan State (assistant)
- 1977–1980: Denver Broncos (ST)
- 1981–1985: San Diego Chargers (special assistant)
- 1986–1989: St. Louis / Phoenix Cardinals (STC)
- 1990–1994: Cincinnati Bengals (STC)

Lacrosse
- 1964: Lafayette

Head coaching record
- Overall: 34–22–1 (football); 3–9–1 (lacrosse)

Marvin Preston Braden (January 25, 1938 – March 14, 2022) was an American college and professional football coach. He was the head football coach at Northeast Missouri State College—now known as Truman State University—from 1967 to 1968 and United States International University—now known as Alliant International University from 1969 to 1972, compiling a career college football coaching record of 34–22–1. Braden served as an assistant coach for several National Football League (NFL) teams including the Denver Broncos, San Diego Chargers, Phoenix Cardinals and Cincinnati Bengals.

He also coached lacrosse. Braden died on March 14, 2022, at the age of 84.

== Head coaching record ==
=== Football ===
Year	Team	Overall	Conference	Standing	Bowl/playoffs
Northeast Missouri State Bulldogs (Missouri Intercollegiate Athletics Association) (1967–1968)
1967	Northeast Missouri State	4–5	2–3	T–3rd	
1968	Northeast Missouri State	5–4	2–3	T–3rd	
Northeast Missouri State:		9–9	4–6		
United States International Westerners (NCAA College Division independent) (1969–1972)
1969	United States International	7–3			
1970	United States International	7–3			
1971	United States International	6–4			
1972	United States International	5–3–1			
United States International:		25–13–1			
Total:		34–22–1			
