= Dave Preston (American football) =

American football player (born 1955)

No. 46
- Position: Running back

Personal information
- Born: May 29, 1955 (age 71); Dayton, Ohio, U.S.
- Listed height: 5 ft 10 in (1.78 m)
- Listed weight: 195 lb (88 kg)

Career information
- High school: Defiance (Defiance, Ohio); Centerville (Centerville, Ohio)
- College: Bowling Green
- NFL draft: 1977: 12th round, 333rd overall pick

Career history
- Denver Broncos (1978–1983); Denver Gold (1984)

Career NFL statistics
- Rushing attempts-yards: 479-1793
- Receptions-yards: 161-1423
- Touchdowns: 13
- Stats at Pro Football Reference

Richard David Preston (born May 29, 1955) is an American former professional football player who was a running back for six seasons with the Denver Broncos of the National Football League (NFL). He played college football for the Bowling Green Falcons. Preston was selected by the New England Patriots in the 12th round of the 1977 NFL draft, but played his entire six-year career in Denver. He started 35 of 76 games, rushing for 1,793 yards and 10 touchdowns on 479 carries. He also caught 161 passes for 1,423 yards and 3 touchdowns. On special teams, Preston returned 18 punts for an 8.5 average and 26 kickoffs for a 23.0 yard average. In 684 touches, he fumbled 15 times, recovering 4 of them (1 every 62.2 touches).

Preston earned the Special Team's MVP his Rookie season, and his most productive year came in 1981 when he combined for 1,150 yards rushing and receiving.

During his years with the Broncos, Preston was also very active in community activities, serving as Colorado Sports Chairman for Muscular Dystrophy. He was honored by the Boy Scouts of America for his community involvement, and nominated for the Miller High-Life NFL Man-of-the Year award in 1981. Preston is a Founding Board Member of Rebuilding Together Metro Denver, and he currently serves on the Denver Bronco Alumni Council. He lives in Boulder, Colorado.
