= Doomsday Defense =

Defense of Dallas Cowboys American football team

The Doomsday Defense was the defensive lineup of the Dallas Cowboys American football team during the dynasty years of the late 1960s to the 1970s. This defense was the backbone of the Cowboys' dynasty, which won two Super Bowls (VI, XII) and played in three more (V, X and XIII).

In 1964, sports writer Gary Cartwright of the Dallas Morning News coined the phrase "Doomsday Defense". The Doomsday Defense is often recognized as having two different "generations," but different listings of players and time periods exist. The original "Doomsday Defense" can generally be identified as the Cowboys' defenses from 1966 to 1974. "Doomsday II" had its heyday from approximately 1975 to 1982. Many Cowboy fans recognize the defense from 1992 to 1996 as "Doomsday III", though to a lesser extent. This defense was in part responsible for the Cowboys being the first team to ever win three Super Bowls in a four-year span.

The first defensive player to be named Most Valuable Player (MVP) of the Super Bowl was linebacker Chuck Howley (V). Later linemen Harvey Martin and Randy White became the first (and only) teammates (co-MVPs) to win the award (XII).

== Lineup ==
=== "Doomsday" ===
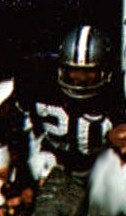
Hall of Famer Mel Renfro pictured in action during Super Bowl V

Defensive line:

- #71 – Willie Townes / #63 – Larry Cole
- #75 – Jethro Pugh
- #74 – Bob "Mr. Cowboy" Lilly (NFL 1960s All-Decade Team; NFL 1970s All-Decade Team; Hall of Fame; Ring of Honor)
- #66 – George Andrie / # 67 – Pat Toomay

Linebackers:

- #54 – Chuck Howley (Hall of Fame; Ring of Honor)
- #55 – Lee Roy Jordan (Ring of Honor)
- #52 – Dave Edwards / #50 – D. D. Lewis

Defensive backs:

- #34 – Cornell Green
- #20 – Mel Renfro (Hall of Fame; Ring of Honor)
- #27 – Mike Gaechter / #41 – Charlie Waters
- #26 – Herb Adderley (Hall of Fame; NFL 1960s All-Decade Team) / #43 – Cliff Harris (Hall of Fame; Ring of Honor)

=== "Doomsday II" ===
Defensive line:

- #79 – Harvey Martin (NFL 1970s All-Decade Team; 1977 NFL Defensive Player of the Year)
- #63 – Larry Cole / #78 – John Dutton
- #54 – Randy "The Manster" White (NFL 1980s All-Decade Team; Hall of Fame; Ring of Honor)
- #72 – Ed "Too Tall" Jones

Linebackers:

- #58 – Mike Hegman / #56 – Thomas "Hollywood" Henderson
- #53 – Bob Breunig
- #50 – D. D. Lewis

Defensive backs:

- #31 – Benny Barnes
- #43 – Cliff Harris (NFL 1970s All-Decade Team; Hall of Fame; Ring of Honor) / #26 – Michael Downs
- #41 – Charlie Waters / #42 – Randy Hughes
- #24 – Everson Walls / #25 – Aaron Kyle
