= Mark Washington (cornerback) =

American football player (born 1947)

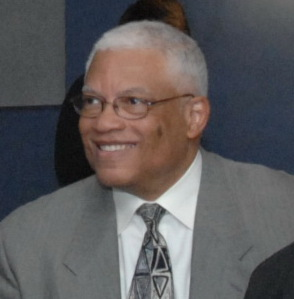
- Washington in 2011

No. 46
- Position: Cornerback

Personal information
- Born: December 28, 1947 (age 78); Chicago, Illinois, U.S.
- Listed height: 5 ft 11 in (1.80 m)
- Listed weight: 188 lb (85 kg)

Career information
- High school: Harlan (Chicago)
- College: Morgan State
- NFL draft: 1970: 13th round, 335th overall pick

Career history
- Dallas Cowboys (1970–1978); New England Patriots (1979)

Awards and highlights
- 2× Super Bowl champion (VI, XII); All-CIAA (1969)

Career NFL statistics
- Games played: 118
- Interceptions: 13
- Interception yards: 107
- Fumble recoveries: 7
- Stats at Pro Football Reference

Mark Henry Washington (born December 28, 1947) is an American former professional football player who was a cornerback in the National Football League (NFL) for the Dallas Cowboys and New England Patriots. He played college football for the Morgan State Bears.

== Early life ==
Washington attended Chicago's John Marshall Harlan Career Academy, before receiving a football scholarship to play for Morgan State University. He was coached by Earl Banks, who at the time sent many of his players to professional football.

He became a four year starter at cornerback and was part of a team that had 31 straight wins. As a senior, he was named co-captain, posted 6 interceptions and received All-CIAA honors. He finished his career with 15 interceptions.

In 1993, he was inducted into the Morgan State University Athletic Hall of Fame.

== Professional career ==
=== Dallas Cowboys ===
Washington was selected by the Dallas Cowboys in the 13th round (335th overall) of the 1970 NFL draft. Even as a rookie, he was one of the best athletes on the team and showed his big play potential with a 100-yard kickoff return for a touchdown against the Washington Redskins. He also blocked an extra point in Super Bowl V. His 48.4 yards per kick return that season remains a franchise record (though unofficial, as he only returned five kicks on the season).

Coming into his second year, he injured his knee while returning a kickoff in preseason and was waived injured on August 25, 1971. He would eventually rejoin the team and play in two games.

When Herb Adderley retired in 1973, he had a chance to earn the left cornerback starting job, but he was passed over by Charlie Waters.

In 1974, he was named the starting left cornerback at mid-season after Waters struggled and held the job until being slowed down by an ankle injury in the last 2 contests, starting a total of 6 games.

In 1975, he was the starter at left cornerback for the full season (14 starts), registered 4 interceptions (tied for second on the team) and helped the Cowboys reach Super Bowl X. But he is mostly remembered for his play against Lynn Swann, who finished the game with four receptions for a then Super Bowl record 161 yards, one touchdown and became the first wide receiver to earn Super Bowl MVP honors. Washington had excellent coverage on Swann on all 4 receptions, but Swann was able to make plays each time.

In 1976, he was replaced with Benny Barnes, but got a chance to start 5 games at right cornerback after Mel Renfro was injured, posting 4 interceptions (led the team).

In 1977, he started 4 games at mid-season after Aaron Kyle suffered a fractured left wrist. He also filled in at left corner in Super Bowl XII when Barnes exited with a foot injury early in the game and registered an interception late in the second quarter. In 1978, he started 3 games at left cornerback in place of Barnes who had foot problems, but was later sidelined himself by a right knee injury. He was waived on August 21, 1979.

=== New England Patriots ===
Washington signed with the New England Patriots as a free agent on September 13, 1979. He was released on November 1, to make room for tight end Al Chandler.
