= Super Bowl XIII =

1979 Edition of the Super Bowl

Pittsburgh Steelers (1) (AFC) (14–2)	Dallas Cowboys (2) (NFC) (12–4)
35	31
Head coach: Chuck Noll	Head coach: Tom Landry
	1	2	3	4	Total
PIT	7	14	0	14	35
DAL	7	7	3	14	31
- Date: January 21, 1979
- Kickoff time: 4:15 p.m. EST (UTC-5)
- Stadium: Miami Orange Bowl; Miami, Florida
- MVP: Terry Bradshaw, quarterback
- Favorite: Steelers by 3.5
- Referee: Pat Haggerty
- Attendance: 79,484

Ceremonies
- National anthem: The Colgate Thirteen
- Coin toss: George Halas
- Halftime show: Bob Jani presents "Carnival: A Salute to the Caribbean"

TV in the United States
- Network: NBC
- Announcers: Curt Gowdy, John Brodie, and Merlin Olsen
- Nielsen ratings: 47.1 (est. 74.74 million viewers)
- Market share: 74
- Cost of 30-second commercial: $185,000

Radio in the United States
- Network: CBS Radio
- Announcers: Jack Buck and Hank Stram

Super Bowl XIII was an American football game between the American Football Conference (AFC) champion Pittsburgh Steelers and the National Football Conference (NFC) champion Dallas Cowboys to decide the National Football League (NFL) champion for the 1978 season. The Steelers defeated the Cowboys by the score of 35–31. The game was played on January 21, 1979, at the Miami Orange Bowl in Miami, Florida, the fifth and last time that the Super Bowl was played in that stadium.

This was the first Super Bowl that featured a rematch of a previous one (the Steelers had previously beaten the Cowboys, 21–17, in Super Bowl X), and both teams were attempting to be the first club to win a third Super Bowl. Dallas was also the defending Super Bowl XII champion, and finished the 1978 regular season with a 12–4 record, and posted playoff victories over the Atlanta Falcons and the Los Angeles Rams. Pittsburgh entered the game after posting a 14–2 regular season record and playoff wins over the Denver Broncos and the Houston Oilers. Super Bowl XIII is also the only Super Bowl to date that featured two teams (and quarterbacks) that had previously won two Super Bowls in the same decade. The Dallas Cowboys (quarterbacked by Roger Staubach) won Super Bowl VI during the 1971 season and Super Bowl XII during the 1977 season. The Pittsburgh Steelers (quarterbacked by Terry Bradshaw) won Super Bowl IX during the 1974 season, and Super Bowl X during the 1975 season. As of the 2025 season, it remains the only Super Bowl rematch to be played in the same stadium as a prior matchup.

Steelers quarterback Terry Bradshaw was named Super Bowl MVP for completing 17 of 30 passes for 318 yards and 4 touchdowns (both of which were Super Bowl records at the time) with 1 interception. He was the first quarterback since Staubach in Super Bowl VI to win the award. Bradshaw eclipsed Bart Starr's Super Bowl record for passing yards in the first half with 253 yards in the air as the Steelers led 21–14 at intermission. His 75-yard touchdown pass in the second quarter also tied Johnny Unitas in Super Bowl V for the longest pass in a Super Bowl. The Cowboys were able to stay close, only trailing 21–17 at the end of the third quarter, but Pittsburgh scored two touchdowns in a span of 19 seconds in the fourth period. Dallas also could not overcome turnovers, drops, and a controversial penalty during the second half. The Cowboys were able to score two touchdowns in the final minutes of the game, but still ended up being the first defending champion to lose in the Super Bowl and the first losing Super Bowl team to score 30 points or more.

Because it was a high-scoring, closely contested game between two of the era's best teams, Super Bowl XIII has been considered one of the greatest Super Bowls.

The game featured a combined 26 Hall of Famers (15 from the Steelers and 11 from the Cowboys).

== Background ==
=== Host selection process ===
The NFL awarded Super Bowl XIII to Miami on June 14, 1977, at the owners' meetings held in New York City. For the first time since 1973, multiple Super Bowl host sites were selected at the same meeting. It marked the fifth and final time the Orange Bowl was chosen to host a Super Bowl. A total of eight cities submitted bids: Miami, Pasadena (Rose Bowl), Los Angeles (Coliseum), Houston (Astrodome), New Orleans, Dallas (Cotton Bowl), Seattle (Kingdome), and Detroit (Pontiac Silverdome). Seattle and Detroit were attempting to become the first cold-weather city to host a Super Bowl, albeit inside a domed stadium. Though neither were selected, Detroit was invited to bid for a future game at the next meeting.

The selection of Miami was seen by some as a surprise, due to the aging condition of the Miami Orange Bowl. Representatives from Miami touted a proposed $8–15 million stadium improvement project, a plan to erect temporary bleachers to increase capacity to nearly 80,000 spectators, and offered the facility for low rent. Observers noted that the owners stuck with familiar venues this time around, choosing Miami for XIII and Pasadena for XIV. Early favorite Houston (Rice Stadium) reportedly fell out of favor with owners when it was revealed that birds were found in the showers of the Vikings training facility during Super Bowl VIII. Likewise New Orleans was passed over since the Superdome was already set to host Super Bowl XII.

This was the first Super Bowl held on January 21 or later. For the 1978–79 season, the NFL extended its schedule from 14 regular season games to 16 and increased the playoffs from an 8-team tournament to 10, creating two extra playoff games. The three division winners from each conference would be ranked first through third and be given a week off, and two wild card teams from each conference, seeded fourth and fifth, would play a playoff game with the winner going on to play the first seeded team (or, if they were in the same division, the second seed).

=== Pittsburgh Steelers ===
The Steelers joined the Cowboys in their attempt to be the first team to win a third Super Bowl, after wins in Super Bowl IX and Super Bowl X. Pittsburgh quarterback Terry Bradshaw had the best season of his career, completing 207 of 368 passes for 2,915 yards and 28 touchdowns, with 20 interceptions. He ranked as the second highest rated passer in the league (84.8), his 28 touchdown passes led the league, and he won the NFL Most Valuable Player Award. Wide receivers Lynn Swann and John Stallworth provided the team with a great deep threat. Swann, who had the best season of his career, recorded 61 receptions for 880 yards and 11 touchdowns, while Stallworth had 41 receptions for 798 yards and 9 touchdowns. Tight end Randy Grossman, who replaced injured starter Bennie Cunningham for most of the season, also was a big factor, recording 37 receptions for 448 yards and a touchdown.

In the Steelers' rushing game, fullback Franco Harris was the team's leading rusher for the 7th consecutive season, recording 1,082 yards and 8 touchdowns, while also catching 22 passes for another 144 yards. Halfback Rocky Bleier had 633 rushing yards and 5 touchdowns, while also catching 17 passes for 168 yards. The Steelers' success on offense was due in large measure to their stellar offensive line, anchored by future Hall of Fame center Mike Webster.

Although Pittsburgh's "Steel Curtain" defense had some new starters this season, such as linemen John Banaszak and Steve Furness, and defensive back Tony Dungy, they finished first in fewest points allowed (195), second in the league against the run (allowing 107.8 yards per game), and ranked third in fewest total yards allowed (4,529). Once again, defensive tackles Joe Greene and L. C. Greenwood anchored the line, while Pro Bowl linebackers Jack Ham and Jack Lambert combined for 7 interceptions. Dungy led the team with 6 interceptions, while the rest of the secondary, defensive backs Mel Blount, Donnie Shell, and Ron Johnson, combined for 11. On special teams, rookie defensive back Larry Anderson ranked second in the NFL with 37 kickoff returns for 930 yards and a touchdown.

=== Dallas Cowboys ===
The Cowboys became the first team to appear in five Super Bowls (after playing in Super Bowls V, VI, X and XII). Dallas led the league in scoring (384) and was No. 2 in total yards (5,959). The defending Super Bowl champions were once again led by quarterback Roger Staubach. Staubach finished the season as the top rated passer in the NFL (84.9) by throwing 231 out of 413 completions for 3,190 yards and 25 touchdowns, with 16 interceptions. He also rushed for 182 yards and another touchdown. Wide receivers Drew Pearson and Tony Hill provided the deep passing threats, combining for 90 receptions, 1,537 yards, and 7 touchdowns. Tight end Billy Joe DuPree contributed 34 receptions for 509 yards and 9 touchdowns. Running back Tony Dorsett had another fine season, recording a total of 1,703 combined rushing and receiving yards, and scoring a total of 9 touchdowns. Fullback Robert Newhouse and halfback Preston Pearson also contributed from the offensive backfield, combining for 1,326 rushing and receiving yards, while Newhouse also scored 10 touchdowns. The Cowboys also had a superb offensive line, led by Herbert Scott and 12-time Pro Bowler Rayfield Wright.

The Cowboys' "Doomsday Defense" finished the season as the top-ranked defense in the league against the run by only allowing 107.6 yards per game, 2nd in total yards allowed (4,009), and 3rd in points allowed (208). Pro Bowl linemen Ed "Too Tall" Jones, Harvey Martin, and Randy White anchored the line, leading the league with 58 sacks, while linebackers Bob Breunig, D. D. Lewis and Thomas "Hollywood" Henderson provided solid support. Their secondary, led by safeties Cliff Harris and Charlie Waters, along with cornerbacks Benny Barnes and Aaron Kyle, combined for 16 interceptions.

The Cowboys started the regular season slowly, winning only six of their first ten games. But Dallas finished strong, winning their last six regular season games to post a 12–4 record.

=== Playoffs ===
Dallas's first opponent was the Atlanta Falcons, a scrappy 9–7 squad making the first playoff appearance in their 13-year history. Despite being 14-point favorites, the Cowboys found themselves trailing 20–13 at the end of the first half, having lost three fumbles and Roger Staubach to a concussion. But under backup quarterback Danny White, Dallas rallied back in the second half with two touchdowns, while their defense intercepted two passes from Steve Bartkowski and forced a turnover on downs on their own 35-yard line late in the fourth quarter as Atlanta was driving for a potential tying score, and the team went on to win 27–20. In the following week, any doubts about the Cowboys due to their struggle to win against the Falcons were quickly put to rest as they shut out the 12–4 Los Angeles Rams 28–0, holding them to just 277 total yards and forcing 7 turnovers.

Meanwhile, the Steelers easily demolished the defending AFC champion Denver Broncos, 33–10, and the Houston Oilers, 34–5. In the AFC championship game, the "Steel Curtain" defense held the Oilers to just 142 yards and forced 9 turnovers.

=== Super Bowl pregame news and notes ===
Although the Super Bowl had grown into America's biggest one-day sporting event by this point, many believe the 13th edition began the game's evolution to unofficial national holiday and cross-cultural phenomenon. It was the first Super Bowl with a true heavyweight title-fight feel, given the Steelers' and Cowboys' unquestioned status as the two best teams in the NFL, as well as the honor of the first three-time Super Bowl champion (and likely team of the 1970s designation) that would go to the winner.

Super Bowl XIII can arguably be called the greatest collection of NFL talent for a game. In addition to coaches Noll and Landry, 17 players would end up being voted into the Pro Football Hall of Fame. Of the 17 Hall of Fame players to play in this game, ten were Pittsburgh players (Bradshaw, Harris, Shell, Swann, Stallworth, Webster, Greene, Lambert, Ham, and Blount), and seven were Dallas players (Staubach, Dorsett, Harris, Drew Pearson, White, Wright, and Jackie Smith). The Cowboys had lured Smith out of retirement from the St. Louis Cardinals, due to injuries to Cowboys tight ends; most notably, Jay Saldi. Other Hall of Famers who participated in the game representing the Cowboys were general manager/team president Tex Schramm, assistant coach Mike Ditka, who was elected as a tight end with the Chicago Bears, and defensive coordinator Ernie Stautner, who actually was a Hall of Fame defensive tackle for the Steelers. Additional Hall of Famers representing the Steelers included owner Art Rooney Sr., his son Dan Rooney, and scout Bill Nunn. Tony Dungy also played in the game as a safety for the Steelers, and is in the Hall of Fame as a head coach.

This was the first Super Bowl in which the designated "home" team was allowed to select between their primary team colored jersey or their white jersey, a rule similar to that of home games in the regular season and playoffs. Previously, the designated "home" team was required to wear their team colored jersey, the NFC champion in odd years and the AFC champion in the even years. The Cowboys, who traditionally wear their white jerseys in home games and often only wear their blue jerseys against teams that have similar policies for themselves (most notably against the Washington Redskins and occasionally the Philadelphia Eagles), were forced to wear their blue jerseys as the "home" team in Super Bowl V, which the team lost to the Baltimore Colts and is widely believed where the "blue jersey jinx" started with America's Team. Not wanting a repeat of that being the designated "home" team in Super Bowl XIII, the Cowboys were able to persuade the NFL to change the rule to allow the "home" team to choose so that they could wear their white jerseys, and thus force the Steelers to wear their black jerseys. The Cowboys would later repeat the option of wearing white jerseys as the "home" team in Super Bowl XXVII, while Washington would do so in Super Bowl XVII and, ironically, the Steelers (who always wear their black jerseys in home games) did in Super Bowl XL due to the team's success on the road that season. Several other teams have since worn white as the designated home team.

This was the first Super Bowl played on grass to match two teams which played their home games on artificial turf.

The Cowboys were playing their third Super Bowl at the Orange Bowl, the first team to play three different Super Bowls in the same stadium. The New England Patriots have since done the same playing three Super Bowls at the Mercedes-Benz Superdome, as have the San Francisco 49ers who have played three Super Bowls at Hard Rock Stadium, including the next Super Bowl to be played in Miami. The Cowboys were 0–3 in Orange Bowl games and 5–0 in their other Super Bowls. Dallas finished 0–5 all-time at the Orange Bowl (not counting a 1–2 record in the Playoff Bowl), losing to the Dolphins in the 1978 and 1984 regular seasons.

Much of the pregame hype surrounding Super Bowl XIII centered around Cowboys linebacker Thomas "Hollywood" Henderson. Henderson caused quite a stir before the NFC Championship Game by claiming that the Rams had "no class" and the Cowboys would shut them out. His prediction came true as the Cowboys did shut them out, aided by Henderson's 68-yard interception return for a touchdown. In the days leading up the Super Bowl, Henderson began talking about the Steelers in the same manner. He predicted another shutout and then made unflattering comments about several Pittsburgh players. He put down the talent and the intelligence of Bradshaw, proclaiming "Bradshaw couldn't spell 'cat' if you spotted him the 'c' and the 'a'." But the Steelers refused to get into a war of words with Henderson. Greene responded by saying the Steelers didn't need to say they were the best, they would just go out on the field and "get the job done."

The matchup of quarterbacks Terry Bradshaw and Roger Staubach is still the only one in Super Bowl history to feature two quarterbacks with two Super Bowl victories. With this start, Staubach became the first quarterback to start four Super Bowls. Bradshaw joined Fran Tarkenton, Bob Griese as well as Staubach as the only quarterbacks to start at least three Super Bowls. The only quarterbacks to start more Super Bowls than Staubach and Bradshaw are John Elway, who guided the Broncos to five Super Bowls, Patrick Mahomes, who took the Chiefs to five Super Bowls, and Tom Brady, who started in ten Super Bowls (nine with the Patriots, one with the Buccaneers). 49ers quarterback Joe Montana, Bills quarterback Jim Kelly, and Peyton Manning (two with the Colts, two with the Broncos) have since each guided their teams to four Super Bowls.

=== Betting line ===
The point spread for the game opened at Pittsburgh -3.5 points. As the Steelers backers placed bets on them the sportsbooks adjusted the line. It eventually hit Pittsburgh -4.5 and then the Dallas money poured in on the Cowboys. It eventually settled at Pittsburgh at -4. The Steelers' four-point eventual margin of victory meant the Las Vegas sportsbooks lost the vast majority of wagers on the game. The game thus came to be known as "Black Sunday" in Las Vegas.

== Broadcasting ==
The game was televised in the United States by NBC, with Curt Gowdy handling play-by-play and sharing the booth with color commentators John Brodie and Merlin Olsen. Dick Enberg served as the pregame host for the broadcast. Also taking part in NBC's coverage were Bryant Gumbel, Mike Adamle (who also covered the Vince Lombardi Trophy presentation ceremony), Donna De Varona, and recently retired former Minnesota Vikings quarterback Fran Tarkenton. For this game and Super Bowl XV, NBC used a custom, synthesizer-heavy theme in place of their regular music.

This was Gowdy's seventh and final Super Bowl telecast, and his last major event for NBC before moving to CBS later in 1979. Enberg had essentially succeeded Gowdy as NBC's lead NFL play-by-play announcer in the 1978 regular season, and network producers didn't decide until nearly the last minute which man would get the Super Bowl call.

The national radio broadcast of Super Bowl XIII was carried by the CBS Radio Network, with Jack Buck and Hank Stram calling the action and Pat Summerall hosting. Locally, Verne Lundquist and Brad Sham called the game for the Cowboys on KRLD-AM in Dallas, while Jack Fleming and Myron Cope called it for the Steelers on WTAE-AM in Pittsburgh. A technical glitch led to Fleming and Cope's commentary going out over NBC's television broadcast in place of the network's own audio during the coin toss ceremony.

In a sign of the game's growing cultural importance, NBC was the first network to make strategic use of the Super Bowl lead-out program, heavily promoting the series premiere of Brothers and Sisters.

The game was later featured on NFL's Greatest Games as Battle of Champions.

This was the last Super Bowl to air on CBC Television in Canada before Global Television Network took over the rights later that year.

== Entertainment ==
The pregame festivities featured the Dallas Cowboys Cheerleaders and several military bands. The Colgate Thirteen performed the national anthem, while the Stetson University Army ROTC Color Guard presented the Colors. The coin toss ceremony featured Pro Football Hall of Famer and longtime Chicago Bears owner/head coach George Halas, who was driven onto the field in a 1920 automobile to commemorate the 1920 founding of the NFL.

The halftime show was "Carnival: A Salute to the Caribbean" with various Caribbean bands.

== Game summary ==
Both teams entered the game with the best defenses in the league (the Cowboys only allowed 107.6 rushing yards per game while the Steelers only allowed 107.8), and each side took advantage of the other team's mistakes throughout the game. But Dallas could not overcome their miscues in the second half.

=== First quarter ===
On their opening drive, the Cowboys advanced to the Pittsburgh 38-yard line, with running back Tony Dorsett gaining 38 yards off three running plays. But while attempting to fool the Pittsburgh defense with a reverse-pass play, wide receiver Drew Pearson fumbled a handoff from Dorsett, and Steelers defensive end John Banaszak recovered the loose ball on the Pittsburgh 47-yard line. Pearson later explained, "We practiced that play for three weeks. It is designed for me to hit Billy Joe 15 to 17 yards downfield. We practiced the play so much it was unbelievable we could fumble it. I expected the handoff a bit lower, but I should have had it. Billy Joe was in the process of breaking into the clear when the fumble occurred." The play was similar to the near-turnover by Butch Johnson in the previous Super Bowl.

The Steelers then attempted two running plays with running back Franco Harris carrying the ball, but only gained 1 yard. Then on 3rd-and-9, wide receiver John Stallworth caught a 12-yard pass from quarterback Terry Bradshaw to advance to the Dallas 40-yard line. Then, after Bradshaw converted another third down, this time with a 10-yard pass to tight end Randy Grossman on 3rd-and-8, he threw a 28-yard touchdown pass to Stallworth to give the Steelers an early 7–0 lead.

On their next drive, the Cowboys responded by advancing to the Steelers' 39-yard line, with quarterback Roger Staubach completing a 27-yard pass to wide receiver Butch Johnson. However, Dallas was forced to punt from their own 39 after Staubach was sacked twice, first for a 12-yard loss by defensive tackle Steve Furness, then for a 10-yard loss by defensive end Dwight White. On the Steelers' ensuing drive, Bradshaw threw a 22-yard pass to Harris on 3rd-and-5 and followed it up with a 13-yard pass to wide receiver Lynn Swann to move the ball to the Dallas 30-yard line. But on the next play, Cowboys linebacker D. D. Lewis ended the drive by intercepting a pass intended for Stallworth. It was the first interception thrown by Bradshaw during a Super Bowl. However, Dallas could do nothing with the turnover and punted after a three-and-out.

With just over a minute to go in the period, defensive end Harvey Martin stripped the ball from Bradshaw, and defensive end Ed "Too Tall" Jones recovered it on the Pittsburgh 41. The Cowboys capitalized on the turnover three plays later with Staubach completing a 39-yard scoring strike to wide receiver Tony Hill, tying the game, 7–7, as the first quarter ended. Pittsburgh sent eight men on an all-out blitz, but Staubach got the pass away just before he was hit by Steelers' safety Mike Wagner. Hill beat safety Donnie Shell in single-coverage and scored the only first-quarter touchdown surrendered by Pittsburgh all season (In Super Bowl X, the Cowboys also scored a first-quarter touchdown against a Steeler team that had not permitted one all year). Drew Pearson ensured the play's success by distracting Steelers cornerback Mel Blount, who was oblivious of Hill as he raced past Blount and Pearson en route to the end zone.

=== Second quarter ===
The Steelers took possession at the start of the second quarter and advanced to their own 48-yard line. On 3rd-and-10, Dallas linebackers Mike Hegman and Thomas "Hollywood" Henderson went after Bradshaw on a blitz. After taking the snap, Bradshaw ran into Franco Harris and the ball popped loose. Bradshaw scooped it up and rolled to his right, looking to pass, but Henderson wrapped him up before he could throw, while Hegman ripped the ball out of Bradshaw's hands and returned the fumble 37 yards for a touchdown, giving the Cowboys their first lead of the game, 14–7.

The Steelers had now turned the ball over on three consecutive possessions, but the Cowboys' lead lasted for less than two minutes, as the Steelers delivered an immediate response. On the third play of Pittsburgh's ensuing possession, Stallworth caught a pass from Bradshaw at the Steelers 35-yard line. He then broke a tackle from cornerback Aaron Kyle, waited for Swann and blockers to cross in front of him, turned toward the inside and outraced every other defender to the end zone, turning a simple 10-yard pass into a 75-yard touchdown completion to tie the score, 14–14. Bradshaw later explained that Stallworth was not even the intended receiver on the play: "I was going to Lynn Swann on the post", he said, "but the Cowboys covered Swann and left Stallworth open. I laid the ball out there and it should have gone for about 15 yards, but Stallworth broke the tackle and went all the way."

Pittsburgh's "Steel Curtain" defense then dominated the Dallas offense on their ensuing drive. First, Banaszak tackled fullback Robert Newhouse for a 4-yard loss. Next, linebacker Jack Ham tackled Dorsett for a 3-yard loss on an attempted sweep. On third down, defensive tackle Joe Greene sacked Staubach, forcing a fumble that bounced through the hands of Furness, and was recovered by Cowboys guard Tom Rafferty at the Dallas 13-yard line. Wide receiver/punt returner Theo Bell then returned punter/backup quarterback Danny White's ensuing 38-yard punt 3 yards to the Dallas 48.

The Steelers began their ensuing drive with Bradshaw's 26-yard pass to Swann. Jones sacked Harris for an 8-yard loss on the next play, but a subsequent holding penalty on Henderson gave Pittsburgh a first down at the Dallas 25-yard line. However, after an incomplete pass and a 2-yard run by Harris, Hegman sacked Bradshaw for an 11-yard loss on third down, pushing the ball back to the 34-yard line. The Steelers then came up empty after kicker Roy Gerela's 51-yard field goal attempt hit the crossbar.

With less than two minutes remaining in the half, Dallas advanced to the Pittsburgh 32-yard line, after starting from their own 34. But Blount exacted revenge from the first quarter by intercepting a pass from Staubach and returning it 13 yards to the 29, with a personal foul called on Dallas tight end Billy Joe DuPree adding another 15 yards and giving the Steelers the ball at their own 44-yard line (note: the interception happened on exactly the same play that Drew Pearson scored on in the first quarter of Super Bowl X; Mike Wagner intercepted Staubach on exactly the same play call in the 4th quarter of the same game). Following an illegal use of hands penalty on Steelers guard Gerry Mullins, Bradshaw completed two passes to Swann for a total gain of 50 yards, moving the ball to the 16-yard line with 40 seconds left in the half. Next, after dropping a pass intended for him, Harris ran the ball 9 yards to the 7-yard line. Then with just 26 seconds left, Bradshaw completed a 7-yard touchdown pass to running back Rocky Bleier, giving the Steelers a 21–14 lead at halftime and would not trail again for the rest of the game.

=== Third quarter ===
The torrid scoring pace slowed during much of the third quarter, as both teams began to assert themselves on the game's defensive side. After the first three possessions of the half ended in punts, a 12-yard punt return by Johnson gave Dallas good field position on Pittsburgh's 42-yard line. The Cowboys subsequently drove down to the 10, aided by a 13-yard reception by running back Preston Pearson on 3rd-and-11 and two 8-yard runs by fullback Scott Laidlaw and Dorsett. Then on 3rd-and-3 at the 10 with less than three minutes remaining in the period, Staubach spotted tight end Jackie Smith wide open in the end zone and threw him the ball. Head coach Tom Landry said Staubach tried to throw the ball soft when he saw how wide open Smith was and that it came in low, and that when Smith tried to stop, his feet seemed to come out from under him. Smith stated that it was still a catchable ball and that he should have made the play. Instead, Smith dropped the pass, and the Cowboys had to settle for kicker Rafael Septién's 27-yard field goal, cutting their deficit to 21–17. Though Smith played 16 years in the league and is now enshrined in the Pro Football Hall of Fame, he is perhaps best known for this dropped touchdown, particularly in a championship game that was ultimately decided by four points. Pittsburgh punted on their next possession, and Dallas got the ball on their own 30 to end the quarter.

=== Fourth quarter ===
Two controversial penalties early in the fourth quarter paved the way for the Steelers to score two unanswered touchdowns.

After forcing the Cowboys to punt to start the quarter, the Steelers advanced to their own 44 after a crucial 10-yard pass from Bradshaw to Grossman on 3rd-and-8, a 13-yard pass to Swann, and a 5-yard run by Harris. Bradshaw then attempted a deep lob pass to Swann, who collided with cornerback Benny Barnes and fell to the ground as the ball rolled incomplete. However, official Fred Swearingen (the referee of the Immaculate Reception game of 1972) called Barnes for pass interference. Replays showed it could have been incidental contact, as Swann seemed to push Barnes in the back, but the penalty nonetheless gave Pittsburgh a new set of downs at Dallas' 23-yard line. Swearingen explained: "It was a judgment call. The two players bumped before the ball was even close to them. They were both looking back and the defender went to the ground. The Pittsburgh receiver, in trying to get the ball, was tripped by the defender's feet."

Two plays later, the Steelers faced 3rd-and-4 from the Dallas 17. Henderson sacked Bradshaw for a 12-yard loss, but the play was nullified by a delay of game penalty on Pittsburgh, bringing up 3rd-and-9 instead of 4th-and-16. Replays clearly showed the whistle blew before the play's onset, plus most of the players pulled up and stopped playing after a whistle sounded, but Henderson claimed, "I didn't hear a whistle until after I had knocked Bradshaw down. The same guy (Swearingen) made that call too. Who is that guy?" Franco Harris confronted Henderson for taunting Bradshaw after the whistle, and on the next play, Bradshaw handed the ball off to Harris, who raced untouched, with help from umpire Art Demmas impeding Cowboys safety Charlie Waters' attempt to tackle him, up the middle for a 22-yard touchdown run. The next day, Waters was quoted as saying, "I don't know what I could do – maybe knock him [Demmas] flat and maybe he'd knock Franco flat? Our safeties play a vital role in the run. That official gets in the way a lot. He screened me off." The score increased Pittsburgh's lead to 28–17 and would be the Steelers' longest touchdown run in a Super Bowl until Willie Parker scampered 75 yards for a score against the Seattle Seahawks in Super Bowl XL.

On the ensuing kickoff, video showed that Gerela slipped when trying to plant his foot, causing him to squib the ball, which bounced to Cowboys defensive tackle Randy White at the Dallas 24-yard line. White, who was playing the game with a cast on his broken left hand, fumbled the ball before being hit by safety Tony Dungy, and linebacker Dennis Winston recovered the ball at the 18 for Pittsburgh. Remarkably, Winston was not even in the middle of the scrum when the fumble first occurred; he was standing by several teammates and decided to join the battle for the ball before the officials intervened. On the very next play, Bradshaw threw an 18-yard touchdown pass to Swann, increasing the Steelers' lead to 35–17 with less than 7 minutes left in the game. The touchdown was Bradshaw's final pass of the game.

Some of the Steelers were already celebrating victory on the sidelines, but the Cowboys were not quite done yet. On their next drive, Dallas drove 89 yards in 8 plays, including an 18-yard run by Staubach on 3rd-and-11 and a 29-yard run by Dorsett, to score on Staubach's 7-yard touchdown pass to DuPree. Then after Cowboys defensive back Dennis Thurman recovered an onside kick with 2:19 remaining, Drew Pearson caught two passes for gains of 22 and 25 yards (the second catch on 4th-and-18), as the Cowboys drove 52 yards in 9 plays to score on Staubach's 4-yard touchdown pass to Johnson, cutting the Steelers' lead to 35–31 with just 22 seconds left in the game.

But the Cowboys' second onside kick attempt was unsuccessful, as Bleier recovered the ball to end the game.

Swann was the leading receiver in the game with 7 receptions for 124 yards and a touchdown. Stallworth recorded 115 yards and two touchdowns off just 3 receptions. Stallworth and Swann became the first pair of teammates to each have 100 yards receiving in a Super Bowl and first time two receivers did it in the same game. Dorsett was the top rusher of the game with 96 rushing yards, and also caught 5 passes for 44 yards. Harris was Pittsburgh's leading rusher with 68 yards, and he caught a pass for 22 yards. Staubach finished the game with exactly as many passing attempts (30) and completions (17) as Bradshaw, good for 228 passing yards, 3 touchdowns, and 1 interception. Butch Johnson caught 2 passes for 30 yards and a touchdown, returned 3 kickoffs for 63 yards, and gained 33 yards on 2 punt returns, giving him 126 total yards. Drew Pearson hauled in 4 passes for 73 yards, all in the fourth quarter.

=== Aftermath ===
After the game, Terry Bradshaw mocked Dallas linebacker Thomas Henderson's previous insult about him not being able to spell the word "cat", stating "Ask if he can spell M.V.P".

The two teams would face off in yet another re-match in Three Rivers Stadium during Week 9 of the 1979 regular season, with the Steelers prevailing in a defensive slug fest, 14–3. Unlike Super Bowl XIII, Harris was able to break free of Doomsday, gaining 48 of his 102 yards on the game-clinching touchdown. The game was mostly remembered for L. C. Greenwood's hit of a sliding Staubach, causing a head injury that later influenced the quarterback to retire following the season.

Pittsburgh would cement their legacy as "The Team of the 70's" by winning Super Bowl XIV over the Los Angeles Rams, 31–19. The Cowboys would fall to the Rams in the Divisional Round in 1979 in Staubach's final game. Led by Danny White, Dallas would appear in three straight NFC Championship games from 1980 to 1982 but wouldn't reach another Super Bowl until their 52–17 victory over the Buffalo Bills in Super Bowl XXVII. Super Bowl XIII is still widely regarded as one of the greatest Super Bowl games played. According to the NFL.com article "Ranking the Super Bowls" by media analyst Elliot Harrison, featuring Dallas personnel man Gil Brandt, Super Bowl XIII was the greatest of the first 49 played. According to Brandt, "Super Bowl XIII, in my mind, was the most memorable of the Super Bowls. Those were two great football teams. We (the Cowboys) made mistakes. We had Randy White on the return team with a cast on, and then he fumbled the kickoff ... which really hurt us. Even though we lost, I would say Super Bowl XIII was the greatest Super Bowl."

=== Box score ===
Super Bowl XIII: Pittsburgh Steelers 35, Dallas Cowboys 31

Quarter	1	2	3	4	Total
Steelers (AFC)	7	14	0	14	35
Cowboys (NFC)	7	7	3	14	31

at Orange Bowl, Miami, Florida

- Date: January 21, 1979
- Game time: 4:15 p.m. EST
- Game weather: 71 °F (22 °C), cloudy

Scoring summary

Quarter	Time	Drive			Team	Scoring information	Score	
Quarter	Time	Plays	Yards	TOP	Team	Scoring information	PIT	DAL
1	9:47	7	53	3:12	PIT	John Stallworth 28-yard touchdown reception from Terry Bradshaw, Roy Gerela kick good	7	0
1	0:00	3	41	1:00	DAL	Tony Hill 39-yard touchdown reception from Roger Staubach, Rafael Septién kick good	7	7
2	12:08	—	—	—	DAL	Fumble recovery returned 37 yards for touchdown by Mike Hegman, Septién kick good	7	14
2	10:25	3	80	1:43	PIT	Stallworth 75-yard touchdown reception from Bradshaw, Gerela kick good	14	14
2	0:26	5	56	1:15	PIT	Rocky Bleier 7-yard touchdown reception from Bradshaw, Gerela kick good	21	14
3	2:36	9	32	4:55	DAL	27-yard field goal by Septién	21	17
4	7:10	8	85	4:58	PIT	Franco Harris 22-yard touchdown run, Gerela kick good	28	17
4	6:51	1	18	:06	PIT	Lynn Swann 18-yard touchdown reception from Bradshaw, Gerela kick good	35	17
4	2:27	8	89	4:24	DAL	Billy Joe DuPree 7-yard touchdown reception from Staubach, Septién kick good	35	24
4	0:22	9	52	2:01	DAL	Butch Johnson 4-yard touchdown reception from Staubach, Septién kick good	35	31
"TOP" = time of possession. For other American football terms, see Glossary of American football.							35	31

== Final statistics ==
Sources: NFL.com Super Bowl XIII, Super Bowl XIII Play Finder Pit, Super Bowl XIII Play Finder Dal

=== Statistical comparison ===
	Pittsburgh Steelers	Dallas Cowboys
First downs	19	20
First downs rushing	2	6
First downs passing	15	13
First downs penalty	2	1
Third down efficiency	9/15	8/16
Fourth down efficiency	0/0	1/1
Net yards rushing	66	154
Rushing attempts	24	32
Yards per rush	2.8	4.8
Passing – Completions/attempts	17/30	17/30
Times sacked-total yards	4–27	5–52
Interceptions thrown	1	1
Net yards passing	291	176
Total net yards	357	330
Punt returns-total yards	4–27	2–33
Kickoff returns-total yards	3–45	6–104
Interceptions-total return yards	1–13	1–21
Punts-average yardage	3–43.0	5–39.6
Fumbles-lost	2–2	3–2
Penalties-total yards	5–35	9–89
Time of possession	26:18	33:42
Turnovers	3	3

=== Individual statistics ===
Steelers passing
	C/ATT^{1}	Yds	TD	INT	Rating
Terry Bradshaw	17/30	318	4	1	119.2
Steelers rushing
	Car^{2}	Yds	TD	LG^{3}	Yds/Car
Franco Harris	20	68	1	22	3.40
Rocky Bleier	2	3	0	2	1.50
Terry Bradshaw	2	–5	0	2	–2.50
Steelers receiving
	Rec^{4}	Yds	TD	LG^{3}	Target^{5}
Lynn Swann	7	124	1	29	12
John Stallworth	3	115	2	75	6
Randy Grossman	3	29	0	10	4
Theo Bell	2	21	0	12	4
Franco Harris	1	22	0	22	2
Rocky Bleier	1	7	1	7	2

Cowboys passing
	C/ATT^{1}	Yds	TD	INT	Rating
Roger Staubach	17/30	228	3	1	100.4
Cowboys rushing
	Car^{2}	Yds	TD	LG^{3}	Yds/Car
Tony Dorsett	16	96	0	29	6.00
Roger Staubach	4	37	0	18	9.25
Scott Laidlaw	3	12	0	7	4.00
Preston Pearson	1	6	0	6	6.00
Robert Newhouse	8	3	0	5	0.38
Cowboys receiving
	Rec^{4}	Yds	TD	LG^{3}	Target^{5}
Tony Dorsett	5	44	0	13	6
Drew Pearson	4	73	0	25	7
Tony Hill	2	49	1	39	4
Butch Johnson	2	30	1	26	2
Billy Joe DuPree	2	17	1	10	4
Preston Pearson	2	15	0	8	5
Robert Newhouse	0	0	0	0	1
Jackie Smith	0	0	0	0	1

^{1}Completions/attempts ^{2}Carries ^{3}Longest gain ^{4}Receptions ^{5}Times targeted

=== Records set ===
The following records were set in Super Bowl XIII, according to the official NFL.com box score and the ProFootball reference.com game summary.
Some records have to meet NFL minimum number of attempts to be recognized. The minimums are shown (in parentheses).

Player records set
Passing records
Most attempts, career	98	Roger Staubach (Dallas)
Most completions, career	61	Roger Staubach (Dallas)
Highest completion percentage, career, (40 attempts)	62.2% (61–98)	Roger Staubach (Dallas)
Most passing yards, career	734	Roger Staubach (Dallas)
Most touchdown passes, career	8	Roger Staubach (Dallas)
Most passing yards, game	318	Terry Bradshaw (Pittsburgh)
Most touchdown passes, game	4	Terry Bradshaw (Pittsburgh)
Highest passer rating, career, (40 attempts)	120.0	Terry Bradshaw (Pittsburgh)
Highest average gain, career (40 attempts)	9.9 yards (623–63)	Terry Bradshaw (Pittsburgh)
Lowest percentage, passes had intercepted, career, (40 attempts)	1.6% (1–63)	Terry Bradshaw (Pittsburgh)
Rushing records
Most yards, career	308	Franco Harris (Pittsburgh)
Most attempts, career	81	Franco Harris (Pittsburgh)
Longest touchdown run	22 yards	Franco Harris (Pittsburgh)
Most rushing yards, game, quarterback	37	Roger Staubach
Highest average gain, career (20 attempts)	5.23 yards (162–31)	Tony Dorsett (Dallas)
Receiving records
Most yards, career	285	Lynn Swann (Pittsburgh)
Highest average gain, career (8 receptions)	25.9 yards (285–11)	Lynn Swann (Pittsburgh)
Combined yardage records ^{†}
Most attempts, career	85	Franco Harris
Most yards gained, career	356	Franco Harris
Fumbles
Most fumbles, career	5	Roger Staubach
Defense
Most sacks, career ^{‡}	5	L. C. Greenwood (Pittsburgh)
Records tied
Most touchdowns, game	2	John Stallworth (Pittsburgh)
Most touchdowns, career	2	Franco Harris; Lynn Swann; John Stallworth (Pittsburgh); Butch Johnson (Dallas)
Most rushing touchdowns, career	2	Franco Harris
Most receiving touchdowns, career	2	John Stallworth; Lynn Swann (Pittsburgh); Butch Johnson (Dallas)
Longest scoring play	75 yards reception	John Stallworth
Longest reception	75 yards	John Stallworth
Most receiving touchdowns, game	2	John Stallworth
Longest pass	75 yards (TD)	Terry Bradshaw
Most (one point) extra points, game	5	Roy Gerela (Pittsburgh)
Most (one point) extra points, career	8	Roy Gerela (Pittsburgh)
Most field goals attempted, career	6	Roy Gerela (Pittsburgh)
Most fumble returns for touchdowns, game	1	Mike Hegman (Dallas)

- † This category includes rushing, receiving, interception returns, punt returns, kickoff returns, and fumble returns.
- ‡ Sacks an official statistic since Super Bowl XVII by the NFL. Sacks are listed as "Tackled Attempting to Pass" in the official NFL box score for Super Bowl X.

Team records set
Most Super Bowl appearances	5	Cowboys
Most Super Bowl victories	3	Steelers
Touchdowns
Most touchdowns, losing team	4	Cowboys
Longest touchdown scoring drive	89 yards	Cowboys
Passing
Most yards passing (net)	291	Steelers
Most passing touchdowns	4	Steelers
Records tied
Most points, game	35	Steelers
Most touchdowns, game	5	Steelers
Most (one point) PATs	5	Steelers
Fewest first downs rushing	2	Steelers
Most first downs, passing	15	Steelers
Fewest punts, game	3	Steelers
Most points, fourth quarter	14	Steelers; Cowboys
Fewest rushing touchdowns	0	Cowboys

Records set, both team totals
	Total	Steelers	Cowboys
Points
Most points	66	35	31
Most points scored, first half	35	21	14
Most points scored, second half	31	14	17
Most points, first quarter	14	7	7
Most points, second quarter	21	14	7
Most points, fourth quarter	28	14	14
Touchdowns, PATs
Most touchdowns	9	5	4
Most (one point) PATs	9	(5–5)	(4–4)
Passing
Most passing yards (net)	467	291	176
Most passing touchdowns	7	4	3
First downs
Most first downs, passing	28	15	13
Punt returns
Most yards gained, game	60	27	33
Records tied
Most times sacked	9	4	5
Fewest first downs rushing	8	2	6

== Starting lineups ==
Hall of Fame ‡

Pittsburgh	Position	Dallas
Offense
John Stallworth‡	WR	Tony Hill
Jon Kolb	LT	Pat Donovan
Sam Davis	LG	Herbert Scott
Mike Webster‡	C	John Fitzgerald
Gerry Mullins	RG	Tom Rafferty
Ray Pinney	RT	Rayfield Wright‡
Randy Grossman	TE	Billy Joe DuPree
Lynn Swann‡	WR	Drew Pearson‡
Terry Bradshaw‡	QB	Roger Staubach‡
Franco Harris‡	RB	Tony Dorsett‡
Rocky Bleier	RB	Robert Newhouse
Defense
L. C. Greenwood	LE	Ed "Too Tall" Jones
Joe Greene‡	LT	Larry Cole
Steve Furness	RT	Randy White‡
John Banaszak	RE	Harvey Martin
Jack Ham‡	LLB	Thomas Henderson
Jack Lambert‡	MLB	Bob Breunig
Loren Toews	RLB	D. D. Lewis
Ron Johnson	LCB	Benny Barnes
Mel Blount‡	RCB	Aaron Kyle
Donnie Shell‡	SS	Charlie Waters
Mike Wagner	FS	Cliff Harris‡

== Officials ==
- Referee: Pat Haggerty #40 first Super Bowl
- Umpire: Art Demmas #78 first Super Bowl
- Head linesman: Jerry Bergman #17 first Super Bowl
- Line judge: Jack Fette #39 fourth Super Bowl (V, VIII, X)
- Back judge: Pat Knight #73 first Super Bowl
- Side judge: Dean Look #49 first Super Bowl
- Field judge: Fred Swearingen #21 first Super Bowl
- Alternate referee: Chuck Heberling #46 did not work a Super Bowl on the field
- Alternate linesman Al Sabato #10 worked Super Bowl VI

This was the first Super Bowl to use a seven-man officiating crew. The side judge was added by a vote of NFL owners at their March 1978 meeting.

Jack Fette became the first official to work four Super Bowls. He added a fifth nine years later, which turned out to be his final game as an on-field official.
