= Fred Swearingen =

American football official (1921–2016)

Fred Swearingen (September 25, 1921 - December 16, 2016) was a former official in the National Football League (NFL), serving as both a referee and back judge from 1960 through 1980. He wore uniform number 21 for the majority of his career. He worked Super Bowl XIII as a back judge, where he called a controversial pass interference against the Dallas Cowboys' Benny Barnes.

Swearingen owned and operated Swearingen's Sporting Goods in Athens, Ohio, United States.

On December 23, 1972, Swearingen was the referee for an AFC Divisional Playoff game between the Pittsburgh Steelers and the Oakland Raiders at Three Rivers Stadium. The game is famous for a play known as the Immaculate Reception. With 22 seconds remaining and Oakland leading 7–6, Pittsburgh was on its own 40-yard line on 4th and 10. Terry Bradshaw threw to John "Frenchy" Fuqua, but safety Jack Tatum collided with Fuqua sending the ball wobbling backward. Rookie running back Franco Harris then scooped up the ball, running untouched into the end zone.

Under the rules at that time, there could not be a legal catch if the ball touched two offensive players, without also touching a defensive player. If the ball either bounced off both Tatum and Fuqua (in any order — or, contacted them simultaneously), or hit only Tatum, the catch would be legal. Swearingen consulted with umpire Pat Harder and field judge Adrian Burk, who each reported he had seen the ball hit both Tatum and Fuqua, and then went to a sideline phone to consult with NFL supervisor of officials Art McNally, who was in the press box. Swearingen emerged and made his ruling that the play was a touchdown. The Steelers went on to win 13–7.

Swearingen died on December 16th, 2016 aged 95 years.
