= The Colgate Thirteen =

American university a cappella group

The Colgate Thirteen, also known as The Colgate 13, is an undergraduate all-male a cappella group at Colgate University. The oldest a cappella group at the University, it is also the oldest collegiate all-male a cappella group in the United States. Established in 1942, The group is named for the 13 men who founded the university in 1819, each offering $13 and 13 prayers. The Thirteen regularly perform at schools, alumni, community, corporate, and sporting events. The group is known for performing the U.S. National Anthem at Super Bowl XIII in 1979. In 2024, the group traveled to Lambeau Field to perform the National Anthem for the Green Bay Packers against the Chicago Bears. In 2026, the group traveled to the Kia Center to perform the National Anthem for the Orlando Magic against the Los Angeles Lakers.

The group has produced 30 albums although only 29 have been released. Some of its best known arrangements are Coney Island Baby, Danny Boy, East of the Sun, Is That the Way You Look?, Mack the Knife, Many Rivers to Cross, Masochism Tango, The National Anthem, Poinciana, Route 66, Walking in Memphis, and If I Ain't Got You. The majority of songs are arranged by members of the group.

The 13 most senior members perform at any time—representing the first tenor, second tenor, baritone, and bass singing parts—but there are more than 13 in the entire group. Students, most of whom are underclassmen, try out for the group, with auditions held either once or twice during the school year. Members of the group are referred to as "Thirteeners". Current members include: Vared Shmuler (Leader), Bo Koebler (Assistant Leader), Andrew Tatela, Zachary Stone, Oliver Strassberg, Justus Loughry, Thomas Sfikas, Shihyung Kim, Michael Darville, Andrew Gathercole, Noah Shak, Adam Morrissey, Sanford Pierson, and Daniel Reilly.

== History ==
=== 1941–1943: Founders ===
The Colgate Thirteen didn't officially form until 1942, but its beginning can be traced several weeks before the U.S. entered World War II. Three students—Norman "Jerry" Scott, Hank Pierce and Evans "Jan" Spear—joined the university's glee club but quit soon afterward because "they just didn't like it," recalled Bill MacIntosh, a fellow Thirteener from the Class of 1944, in a 2017 documentary about the group. "The songs they were singing were the same old hackneyed songs."

Scott, Pierce and Spear, all members of the Class of 1943, began singing at the Colgate Inn, the historic hotel in downtown Hamilton, with other students. By Christmas 1941, there were seven students who were consistently harmonizing. Early the following year, Spear found a more permanent accommodation at the Student Union and opened the group up to other students. They settled on the "Thirteen" as a name since there were 13 fraternities at the time, said MacIntosh. The group became official on July 2, 1942. Spear, who is credited as the driving force behind the creation of the group, became its first elected leader. Richard "Dick" Kromer, Class of 1944, was elected treasurer and librarian.

The newly formed Colgate Thirteen sang its first high school concerts in Amherst, Bennett and Kenmore near Buffalo, NY, and at an alumni banquet with a total of at least 2,000 concert-goers though news reports pegged the collective audience as high as 5,000. But the group sang for only five months due to WWII. The university instituted an accelerated schedule to graduate students for military service and seven Thirteeners in the Class of '43 earned their degrees in December 1942. New members were recruited, but the Thirteen disbanded the following spring as the war intensified.

=== 1945–1950: Post-war revival ===
When the war ended, the Thirteen regrouped and attracted new students. The group became more resolute as an ensemble, practicing three hours a week instead of one and expanding its repertoire to about 40 songs with comedy and Broadway melodies. The group also beefed up its showmanship and performed at various, mostly local venues: business and alumni gatherings, bars, fraternity parties and even sororities as far as Syracuse University and Skidmore College.

As the decade closed, the group was invited to sing at the famed Waldorf Astoria Hotel's Starlight Roof nightclub in New York City. The formal dinner event hosted by an insurance brokers organization reportedly had 500 people in attendance. It was the first time the Thirteen publicly sang the National Anthem, which they were apprehensive about during rehearsals. "I don't think we could've sung it any better if we practiced a million times," said Hugh Meinweiser, a Class of 1949 Thirteener in the documentary. "It absolutely was a knockout."
