= Harlan Community Academy High School =

High School in Chicago, Illinois, United States

Location
- 9652 S. Michigan Avenue; Chicago, Illinois 60628; United States; 41.7185°N 87.6213°W

Information
- School type: Public; Secondary
- Opened: 1958
- School district: Chicago Public Schools
- Principal: Kai L. Jones
- Grades: 9–12
- Gender: Coed
- Enrollment: 166 (2025–2026)
- Campus type: Urban
- Colors: Blue; White
- Athletics conference: Chicago Public League
- Team name: Falcons
- Accreditation: North Central Association of Colleges and Schools
- Yearbook: Falcon
- Website: www.harlanfalcons.org

John Marshall Harlan Community Academy High School is a public four-year high school located in the Roseland neighborhood on the south side of Chicago, Illinois, United States. Harlan is a part of the Chicago Public Schools district. Opened in 1958, the school is named for Kentucky lawyer, politician and associate justice of the U.S. Supreme Court John Marshall Harlan.

== History ==
In June 1957, the Chicago Board of Education approved work to begin building the new Harlan High School with a budget of $3.2 million bordered at 97th street and Michigan avenue. The school building was constructed in 18-months by a local Chicago construction company (Joseph J. Duffy company), and to accommodate between 1,800 and 2,000 students.

In December 1957, community members and parents protested the lack of a swimming pool being built in the school, which resulted in a months of negotiations. The parents cited that another new school (Bogan High School) that was being constructed at the time was to receive a pool, and that Harlan should have the same facility. The school board stated that the schools are not architecturally alike and it would cost more to construct a pool at Harlan rather than Bogan. Months before its opening, Parents of Fenger High School filed a suit in circuit court requesting that the school board extend the school's attendance boundaries, affecting 300 Fenger students wanting to attend the new school. The suit was dismissed. The school opened for students in September 1958 at 9652 S. Michigan Avenue with an enrollment of 1,400.

By April 1965, the school's enrollment was at 2,726 (88% above capacity); predominantly African-American (93%). Due to this, the school had to run 12-period days, five separate lunch periods and six mobile classrooms. The school's program attracted students living outside of its attendance area, cited as the cause of the overcrowding. In August 1985, the school was designated as a "community academy" and began accepting students outside its attendance area through the Option for Knowledge program. Harlan added the science, technology, engineering, and mathematics (STEM) academic program during the 2009–2010 school year. CPS removed Harlan's middle school program after the 2016-2017 due to low-enrollment.

=== Other information ===
In March 1969, the school experienced a series of fires that was started in a mobile classroom. The day of the fires, twenty–five students protested the firing of an African–American math teacher at the school. In November 1970, Two students were shot while standing in a second–floor hallway at the school. The shooting was believed to be street gang recruiting activity.

On September 13, 2005, a fight broke out between two boys in the gymnasium. One of the boys pulled out a gun and shot the other in the leg. A police officer at the school arrested the gunman, who was charged with aggravated battery.

== Athletics ==
Harlan competes in the Chicago Public League (CPL) and is a member of the Illinois High School Association (IHSA). Harlan's sports teams are known as the Falcons. The boys' basketball and track and field teams have each won three Public League championships (1963–64, 1965–66, 1966–67) and (1966–67, 1969–70, 1970–71) respectively. They were Public League cross country running champions in 1961–62 and baseball champions in 1992–93. Illinois statewide, the Falcon boys' won the state championship in track and field for 1966–67 season.

== Notable alumni ==
- Tina Andrews, 1969 – actress and author.
- Emil Brown, 1993 – baseball player, MLB (Pittsburgh Pirates, San Diego Padres, Kansas City Royals, Oakland Athletics, New York Mets).
- Dennis DeYoung, 1964 – musician, founding member and principal songwriter for the band Styx
- Bonnie Greer – writer, critic and broadcaster
- Glenn Loury - conservative academic and economist.
- Cliff Meely, 1966 – basketball player, NBA (Houston Rockets), seventh overall pick of 1971 NBA draft.
- Scipio Spinks, 1965 – baseball player, MLB (Houston Astros, Saint Louis Cardinals).
- Mark Washington, 1966 – football player, NFL (Dallas Cowboys).
- Five Stairsteps – American family vocal group (including members Alohe Burke, Clarence Burke, Jr. and James Burke), best known for the 1970 R&B hit song "O-o-h Child".
- Michael Howard - DJ Mechanically Incline aka USA Mikey - 1990 DJ, Businessman, Marketing, Actor

== Notable staff ==
- Lena McLin – teacher and composer; served as music teacher at the school from 1965 until 1969.
- Sherman Howard – coach and athletic director; played pro football with the Cleveland Browns 1952–1953.
