= D. D. Lewis (1970s linebacker) =

American football player (1945–2025)

No. 50
- Position: Linebacker

Personal information
- Born: October 16, 1945; Knoxville, Tennessee, U.S.
- Died: September 16, 2025 (aged 79); Plano, Texas, U.S.
- Listed height: 6 ft 1 in (1.85 m)
- Listed weight: 225 lb (102 kg)

Career information
- High school: Fulton (Knoxville)
- College: Mississippi State
- NFL draft: 1968: 6th round, 159th overall pick

Career history
- Dallas Cowboys (1968–1981)

Awards and highlights
- 2× Super Bowl champion (VI, XII); First-team All-American (1967); Second-team All-American (1966); SEC Defensive Player of the Year (1967); 2× First-team All-SEC (1966, 1967); SEC All-Sophomore Team (1965); Mississippi Sports Hall of Fame (1987); Tennessee Sports Hall of Fame (2006)

Career NFL statistics
- Fumble recoveries: 14
- Interceptions: 8
- Touchdowns: 1
- Sacks: 15.5
- Stats at Pro Football Reference
- College Football Hall of Fame

Dwight Douglas Lewis (October 16, 1945 – September 16, 2025) was an American professional football player who was a linebacker for the Dallas Cowboys of the National Football League (NFL). He played college football for the Mississippi State Bulldogs and was selected in the sixth round of the 1968 NFL/AFL draft. Lewis was inducted into the College Football Hall of Fame in 2001.

== Early life ==
Born in Knoxville, Tennessee, on October 16, 1945, Lewis was the youngest of 14 children. Lewis was named Dwight Douglas after two great generals in World War II, Dwight Eisenhower and Douglas MacArthur. He attended Fulton High School, where he was a Tennessee All-State linebacker in 1963.

== College career ==
Lewis starred at Mississippi State University from 1965 to 1967 as a two-way player and three-year starter. He led the Bulldogs in tackles and assists all three of his varsity seasons and was named team captain his senior year.

Despite being on teams that went 7–23, Lewis earned All-Southeastern Conference honors twice and was a first-team All-American selection his senior year.

Repeatedly referred to as the top linebacker in the SEC, Lewis made a distinct impression on rival coaches. Hall of Fame coach Bear Bryant called D.D. Lewis "the best linebacker in the country". Bill Yeoman applauded Lewis' ability to recover and pursue and said he was the finest linebacker he had seen that year. Following the 1967 season, Vince Dooley said he was the best linebacker Georgia had faced – "He's terrific."

Lewis won numerous awards: SEC All-sophomore team (1965), All-SEC (1966–67), SEC defensive player of the year (1967), UPI second-team All-American (1967), and outstanding athlete (1968). At the end of his senior year, Lewis was selected to play in the Senior Bowl, the Coaches All-America Game, and the Blue–Gray Game.

For his accomplishments while at Mississippi State University, Lewis was inducted into the nation's College Football Hall of Fame in 2001. In 1987, Lewis was inducted into the state of Mississippi Sports Hall of Fame. Lewis is also a member of the Mississippi State, Blue–Gray Game, Knoxville, Mississippi and Tennessee sports Hall of Fame.

== Professional career ==
Although he was a great college player, Lewis was selected by the Dallas Cowboys in the sixth round (159th overall) of the 1968 NFL/AFL draft, because teams thought that he was too small to play in the NFL. As a rookie at training camp, the team tried him at center, before moving him to outside linebacker.

In 1969, he spent what would have been his second season doing military service. In 1973 after serving as a backup for four seasons, Lewis took over the weakside linebacker position, when Chuck Howley retired, and held this position for nine straight years.

His best game was in the 1975 NFC Championship Game, when he intercepted two passes in a 37–7 victory against the Los Angeles Rams, helping the Cowboys become the first wild-card team to make it to the Super Bowl.

To this day, he holds the Cowboys playoff record with 27 games played. During his NFL career, Lewis played in 12 NFC divisional-round contests, one NFC wild-card contest, and nine NFC Championship Games. He made five Super Bowl appearances while winning Super Bowl VI, and Super Bowl XII. During the 1980 season, he became along with Larry Cole, the first three-decade players in franchise history.

Lewis played for 13 years and started 135 consecutive games (third in team history), until his retirement after the 1981 season. He was voted the "Most Popular Player" by the Cowboys fans and given the Bart Starr Meritorious Award in 1981. He is one of only eight NFL players to have played in five Super Bowls: (V, VI, X, XII, and XIII).

During the 1982 season, Lewis famously reasoned that "Texas Stadium has a hole in its roof so God can watch His favorite team play".

Although he was never selected to a Pro Bowl or All-Pro squad, he served as defensive co-captain in 1977 and 1978. In 1984, he was named to the Cowboys Silver Anniversary Team.

== Death ==
Lewis died on September 16, 2025, in Plano, Texas, at the age of 79.
