= Aaron Kyle =

American football player (born 1954)

No. 25, 22
- Position: Cornerback

Personal information
- Born: April 6, 1954 (age 72); Detroit, Michigan, U.S.
- Listed height: 5 ft 11 in (1.80 m)
- Listed weight: 185 lb (84 kg)

Career information
- High school: Cass Technical (Detroit)
- College: Wyoming
- NFL draft: 1976: 1st round, 27th overall pick

Career history
- Dallas Cowboys (1976–1979); Denver Broncos (1980–1982)

Awards and highlights
- Super Bowl champion (XII); All-WAC (1975)

Career NFL statistics
- Games played: 95
- Games started: 76
- Interceptions: 11
- Stats at Pro Football Reference

Aaron Douglas Kyle (born April 6, 1954) is an American former professional football player who was a cornerback in the National Football League (NFL) for the Dallas Cowboys and Denver Broncos. He was selected in the first round of the 1976 NFL draft. He played college football at the University of Wyoming.

== Early life ==
Kye attended Cass Technical High School in Detroit, Michigan. He played halfback and linebacker. He graduated in 1971 and accepted a football scholarship from the University of Wyoming. As a freshman, he was a backup running back, tallying 3 carries for 8 yards. As a sophomore, he was moved to strong safety. He was also a punt returner during his first three years.

As a senior, he was switched to cornerback and was used on either side of the field. He received All-WAC honors, played in the 1975 Blue–Gray Football Classic, the Senior Bowl and the East–West Shrine Game. He was the team's best defensive player in his last two years and left as the school's career leader in tackles (275).

In 2016, he was inducted into the Wyoming Athletics Hall of Fame.

== Professional career ==
=== Dallas Cowboys ===
In the 1976 NFL draft, he became only the second Wyoming player ever to be drafted to the NFL in the first round and the first defensive back ever to be selected by the Dallas Cowboys that high. As a rookie, he was the backup at left cornerback behind Benny Barnes and was used on passing downs to primarily cover the running backs. He became a core special teams player, registering 2 blocked punts.

In 1977, he replaced future hall of famer Mel Renfro in the starting lineup at right cornerback. His play was impacted after fracturing the left wrist during a 34-16 win over the Washington Redskins in the fifth game. He missed the last four games of the season because of a heavy cast that was placed on his injured right arm. He returned for the playoffs to help the team win Super Bowl XII, recording three tackles, an interception, a tackle on a run from a punt attempt and a fumble recovery that set up the game-clinching touchdown.

In 1978, he started all 16 games at cornerback, while making 3 interceptions and 2 fumble recoveries (tied for the team lead). He also had an interception in the playoffs against the Atlanta Falcons. In Super Bowl XIII, he missed a tackle that allowed John Stallworth to have a 75-yard touchdown play.

In 1979, although he started 16 games, he was limited by bone spurs in his left knee that he developed during training camp. He intercepted two passes in the season opener against the St. Louis Cardinals.

In May 1980 season, he had knee surgery to remove the bone spurs, which led the team to place him in the injured reserve list. Once the season started, the Cowboys tried to recall him from the injured reserve list, but because they used the procedural recall system to waive him, he was able to be declared as a free agent.

=== Denver Broncos ===
On October 14, 1980, he signed as a free-agent with the Denver Broncos, playing in 10 games (9 starts) and recording 72 tackles.

Kyle played a total of 3 seasons in Denver, starting at right cornerback, while leading the team in turnovers in both 1981 and 1982, with a total of 5 interceptions and 7 fumble recoveries. In 1981, he registered 68 tackles. He retired on April 16, 1983, after being the Broncos player representative during that season's strike.
