= Harvey Martin =

American football player and professional wrestler (1950–2001)

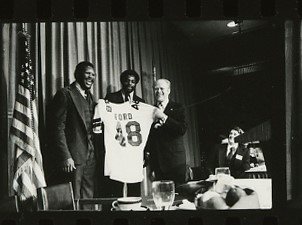
- Martin and Ed "Too Tall" Jones present President Gerald Ford with a football jersey at the Texas Stadium Club, April 9, 1976.

No. 79
- Position: Defensive end

Personal information
- Born: November 16, 1950; Dallas, Texas, U.S.
- Died: December 24, 2001 (aged 51); Grapevine, Texas, U.S.
- Listed height: 6 ft 5 in (1.96 m)
- Listed weight: 262 lb (119 kg)

Career information
- High school: South Oak Cliff (Dallas)
- College: East Texas State (1969–1972)
- NFL draft: 1973: 3rd round, 53rd overall pick

Career history
- Dallas Cowboys (1973–1983)

Awards and highlights
- Super Bowl champion (XII); Super Bowl MVP (XII) (Note: Co-winner with Randy White); NFL Defensive Player of the Year (1977); First-team All-Pro (1977); 3× Second-team All-Pro (1976, 1979, 1982); 4× Pro Bowl (1976–1979); NFL sacks leader (1977); NFL 1970s All-Decade Team; Third-team Little All-American (1972)

Career NFL statistics
- Sacks: 10
- Safeties: 2
- Interceptions: 2
- Interception yards: 7
- Fumble recoveries: 6
- Stats at Pro Football Reference

Harvey Banks Martin (November 16, 1950 – December 24, 2001) was an American professional football player who was a defensive end in the National Football League (NFL) for the Dallas Cowboys from 1973 until 1983. He starred at South Oak Cliff High School and East Texas State University, before becoming an All-Pro and Super Bowl MVP with the Cowboys.

== Early life ==
In Martin's junior year (1967) in high school, he transferred to South Oak Cliff High School, which had become the first integrated high school in Dallas. That year, he overheard his father tell his mother that he was ashamed that his son did not play like his friends' children, so Martin decided to suit up for a football team for the first time in his life. The team went 9–1, though Martin was a backup offensive tackle and only played whenever they had a sizable lead.

He would change that in his senior year, when in the spring game he got a chance to fill in on defense and eventually convinced the coaches to move him to defensive tackle. By the third game of his senior season, he was a starter and became the best lineman on a 12–1 team that won the Dallas City championship and went on to the State quarterfinals. Still he was so thin and so late-blooming, that the only college that offered him a scholarship was East Texas State in Commerce (now named Texas A&M University–Commerce).

Outside of Dwight White being his roommate, his first two college seasons playing as a defensive end were undistinguished. But he evolved into the best defensive end in school history. During his senior year (1972), en route to leading the school to a national title, he was named to the NAIA All-American, All-Texas, and All-LSC teams.

Martin is one of the most recognized names in the history of Texas A&M University–Commerce athletics and was inducted into its Hall of Fame in 1987. Texas A&M University–Commerce in 2008 also started hosting the Harvey Martin Classic, where the school's football team plays against another team from the Lone Star Conference.

In 2007, he was selected to the Lone Star Conference’s 75th Anniversary football team and was named the LSC defensive player of the decade for the 1970s. In 2010, he was inducted into the Lone Star Conference Hall Of Fame.

== Professional career ==
Martin was selected by the Dallas Cowboys in the third round of the 1973 NFL draft. During his first years with the team, the coaching staff looked to instill in Martin a sense of aggressiveness, confidence and mental toughness, that didn't come naturally to him. He eventually improved his physical strength and his technique by practicing against future hall of famer Rayfield Wright. He also developed into an emotional player and fierce competitor, so much so, that he was nicknamed "Too Mean". By his third year in 1975, he was a full-time starter.

The NFL didn't start recognizing quarterback sacks as an official stat until 1982; however, the Cowboys have their own records, dating back before the 1982 season. According to the Cowboys' stats, Martin is unofficially credited with a total of 114 sacks, leading the Cowboys in sacks seven times during a nine-year period, with a high total of 23 sacks in 1977. Martin played only on passing downs as a rookie and led the team in sacks with 9, tying Willie Townes' rookie team record. Martin took down the QB 7.5 times in 1974 and 9.5 times in 1975. Martin broke out with 15 1/2 sacks in 1976 and made the Pro Bowl for the first time. He still holds the team record for most sacks for a rookie (9 - 1973) and in a season (23 - 1977). His unofficial career franchise sack record lasted 30 years, before being broken by DeMarcus Ware in 2013.

His 1977 season was one of the greatest ever by an NFL player. In a 14-game season he totaled 85 tackles and a league-leading 23 sacks, (equaling Myles Garrett's record 23 sacks achieved in 17 games), he was named the NFL Defensive Player of the Year, a consensus All-Pro selection, was a key player in the Cowboys winning Super Bowl XII, and a co-MVP of the game with Randy White.

Martin remained the team sack leader or co-leader every year, but his totals started to dwindle as his personal problems (financial problems and addictions) grew bigger. He followed up his 23-sack 1977 season with a 16-sack performance in 1978, 10 in 1979, 12 in 1980, 10 in 1981, 8 in 1982 and 2 in 1983.

As part of the famed Doomsday Defense, "The Beautiful" aka "Too Mean" went to the Pro Bowl four times. Former Cowboys GM Tex Schramm stated: "He'll be remembered as one of the great Cowboys of the golden years ... He was a great player, one of the first great pass rushers". Martin, along with Don Meredith, is among the few players to play his high school (Dallas South Oak Cliff High School), college (East Texas State University, now Texas A&M University–Commerce), and pro career (Dallas Cowboys) in and around the Dallas, Texas, area. He never played a home game, at any level, outside of North Texas.

Martin retired in 1983 after refusing to take a Cowboys-ordered drug test and during a feud with the team in which he claimed he was being forced to play injured. Martin later admitted in a 1986 autobiography that he did indeed have a cocaine addiction at the time.

In 2009, he was inducted into the Texas Sports Hall of Fame. He is also a member of the Texas Black Sports Hall of Fame.

The Professional Football Researchers Association named Martin to the PFRA Hall of Very Good Class of 2016.

== Personal life ==
Following his retirement in 1984, Martin briefly served as an NFL analyst for NBC, participated in the battle royal at WrestleMania 2 (1986) for World Wrestling Federation, and appeared several times in World Class Championship Wrestling and the Global Wrestling Federation as a ringside commentator.

With football gone, many inner demons came to light, including bankruptcies, domestic violence, and polysubstance abuse. Although coach Tom Landry sent him to rehab in 1983, Martin continued to abuse drugs and alcohol. He hit rock-bottom in 1996 when "Too Mean" was jailed on domestic violence and cocaine charges, receiving probation and spending eight months in a court-ordered rehabilitation program.

During the last years of his life, Martin turned his life around. He secured a job as a salesman for Dallas company Arrow-Magnolia. He also spoke to children, drug addicts, and other groups about drug abuse and the challenges of his life. On December 24, 2001, Martin died of pancreatic cancer at Baylor Medical Center in Grapevine, Texas. He was survived by his mother, son, and daughter. Martin never married. Many former teammates were among the 1,000 people who attended his funeral service at Prestonwood Baptist Church in Plano. Martin's sister, Mary Martin, established the Harvey Martin Dream Foundation, Inc., an organization to foster educational mentoring and financial assistance to minority high school students, in her brother's memory. Of Harvey Martin's legacy, Tex Schramm commented, “He’ll be remembered as one of the great Cowboys of the golden years.”

Martin died of pancreatic cancer on December 24, 2001, at the age of 51. Martin was the first Super Bowl Most Valuable Player to die. The surviving co-MVP, Randy White, would perform the ceremonial coin toss at Super Bowl XLVII, which, like Super Bowl XII, was played in New Orleans. White was also present to represent Martin and himself at both Super Bowl XL and Super Bowl 50, during the recognition honors for all past Super Bowl MVP's.
