= Cliff Harris =

American football player (born 1948)

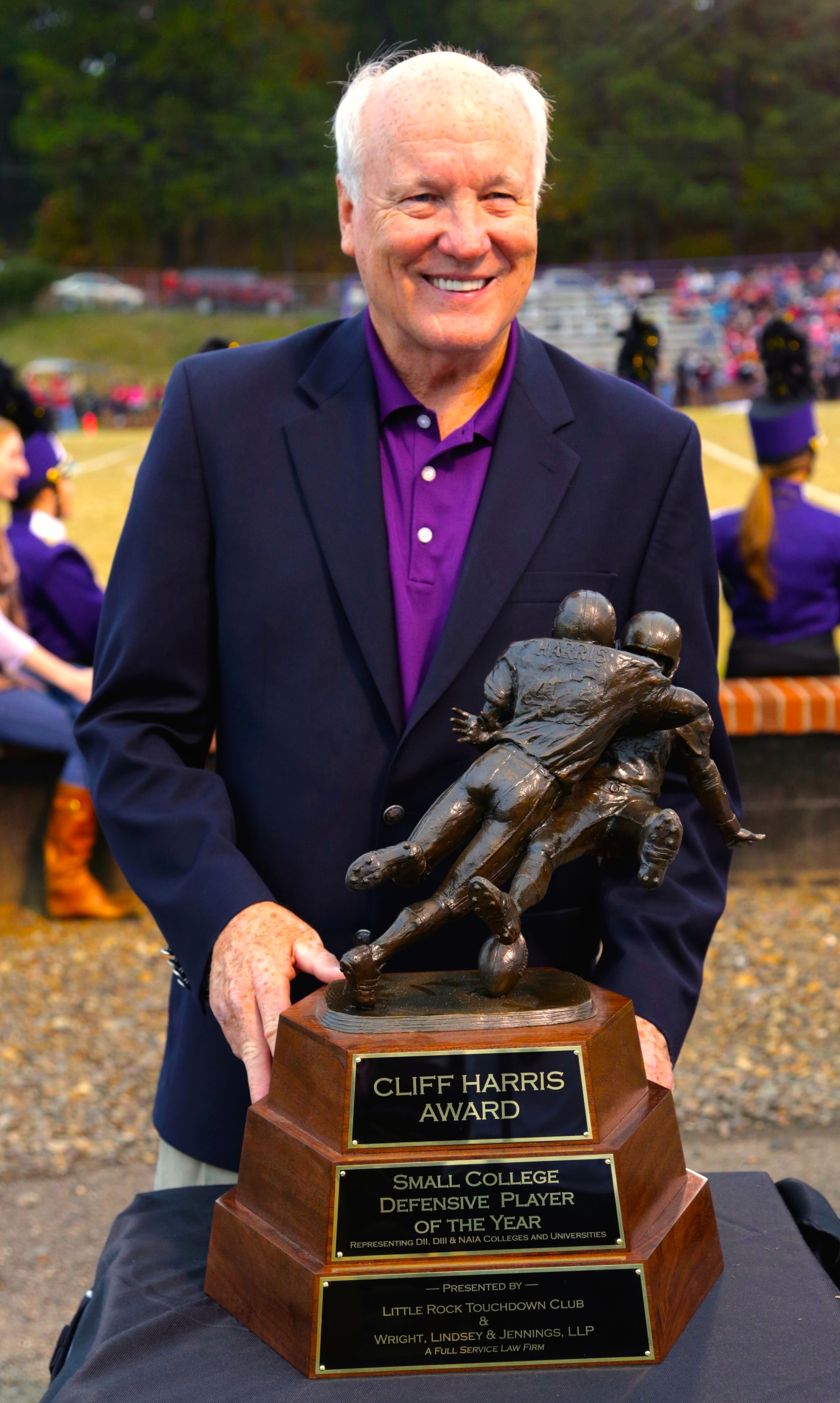
- Harris with the Cliff Harris Award in 2013

No. 43
- Position: Safety

Personal information
- Born: November 12, 1948 (age 77); Fayetteville, Arkansas, U.S.
- Listed height: 6 ft 0 in (1.83 m)
- Listed weight: 188 lb (85 kg)

Career information
- High school: Des Arc (Des Arc, Arkansas)
- College: Ouachita Baptist (1966–1969)
- NFL draft: 1970: undrafted

Career history
- Dallas Cowboys (1970–1979)

Awards and highlights
- 2× Super Bowl champion (VI, XII); 4× First-team All-Pro (1975–1978); Second-team All-Pro (1974); 6× Pro Bowl (1974–1979); NFL 1970s All-Decade Team; Dallas Cowboys Ring of Honor; 2× All-AIC (1968, 1969)

Career NFL statistics
- Games played: 141
- Interceptions: 29
- Interception yards: 281
- Touchdowns: 1
- Punt returns: 66
- Punt return yards: 418
- Kick return yards: 1,622
- Stats at Pro Football Reference
- Pro Football Hall of Fame

Clifford Allen Harris (born November 12, 1948) is an American former professional football player who was a safety for the Dallas Cowboys of the National Football League (NFL) for ten seasons. A Pro Football Hall of Famer, he appeared in five Super Bowls and was selected to six consecutive Pro Bowls. Harris retired from football at 31 to focus on his work within the oil business.

== Early life and college ==
Born in Fayetteville, Arkansas, Harris started his football career as a backup quarterback at Hot Springs High School, but moved to Des Arc High School for his senior season.

Harris was only offered a scholarship to Ouachita Baptist University (OBU) in Arkadelphia, after his father's roommate at Ouachita convinced head coach Buddy Benson to do it. Harris' father, O.J "Buddy" Harris, also played football for OBU. In college, Cliff became an accomplished defensive back. He played all of the secondary positions and was a quality kick returner. He was named to two All-Arkansas Intercollegiate Conference (AIC) teams and was part of the 1966 AIC Football Championship team during his freshman season. Harris was part of the track and field team and graduated with a double major in math and physics.

In addition to the Pro Football Hall of Fame (2020), Harris has been inducted into numerous other athletic halls of fame, including the Texas Sports Hall of Fame (2015), the Arkansas Sports Hall of Fame (1985), the NAIA Hall of Fame (1978) and the Ouachita Athletics Hall of Fame (2003).

== Professional career ==
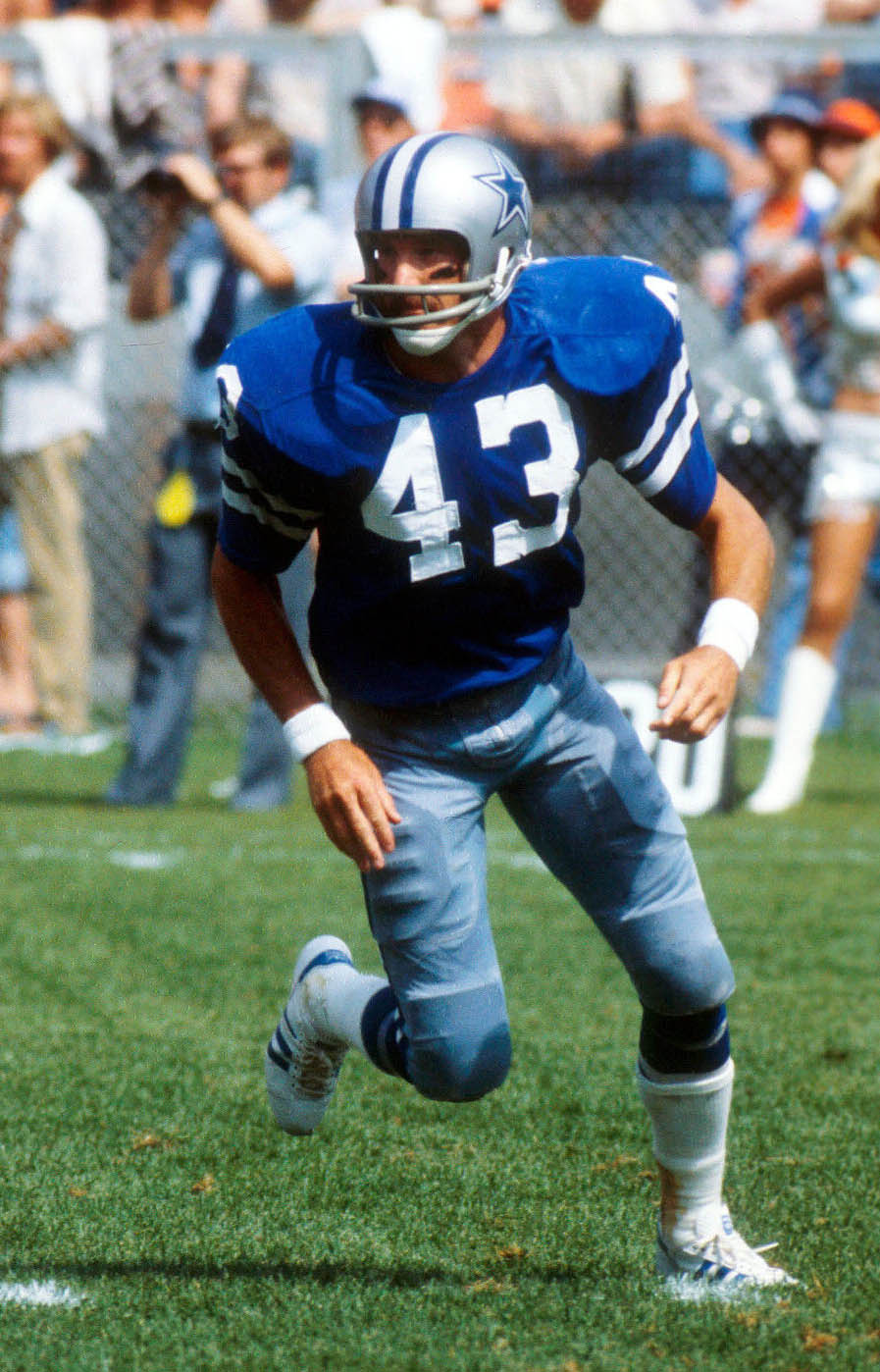
Harris with the Cowboys

Harris was not chosen in the 1970 NFL draft, but the Cowboys invited him to training camp and he signed as a free agent. He beat out Cowboys third-round draft choice Charlie Waters (who did not crack the starting lineup until the retirement of Cornell Green following the 1974 season) for the starting free safety position his rookie year. Military service caused him to miss the second half of the season, although he returned in time for Super Bowl V and never relinquished the position after 1971. Harris was a key member of the Cowboys Super Bowl VI winning team in the following season, intercepting 2 passes and recovering three fumbles, while also ranking 3rd in the NFL with a 28.4 yards per kickoff return average.

He eventually teamed up with Waters to form the top safety duo in the NFL in the 1970s. Harris made it a point to wear the pads of placekickers in order to keep his speed and quickness up.

Harris won another Super Bowl with the Cowboys in the 1977 season, intercepting 5 passes that year. He also played in Super Bowl X and Super Bowl XIII, both losses to the Pittsburgh Steelers, making him one of the few players to play in all five of Dallas' Super Bowl appearances in the 1970s. Harris gained some infamy in Super Bowl X for an incident after Steelers kicker Roy Gerela missed a third quarter field goal that would have tied the game (his second miss of the day). After the play, he mockingly hugged Gerala and patted him on his helmet, resulting Harris being violently shoved to the ground by Steelers linebacker Jack Lambert. Gerela went on to make his next two field goal attempts and help the Steelers win the game.

Harris was nicknamed "Captain Crash" by his teammates for his punishing hits and reckless pursuit of ball carriers and was also described as a "rolling ball of butcher knives" by hall of fame head coach George Allen. Pro Football Hall of Fame safety Larry Wilson said of Harris, "I feel Harris is the finest free safety in the business today. He changed the way the position is being played. You see other teams modeling their free safeties around the way Harris plays the pass, and striking fear in everyone on the field because he hits so hard.". The Cowboys' defense ranked in the top 10 every year with him in the lineup.

He is one of only 13 players in NFL history to play in five Super Bowls, was chosen for the Pro Bowl six consecutive times and was voted First-team All-Pro four times. The Cowboys were surprised when Harris announced his retirement in March 1980 at the age of 31 to concentrate on his oil business ventures. Sports Illustrated writers named him their Football Dream Team free safety. In 2004, he was a finalist for the Pro Football Hall of Fame and was added to the Dallas Cowboys Ring of Honor. He was also selected to the National Football League 1970s All-Decade Team and the Cowboys Silver Season All-Time Team in 1984. In 2011, the Professional Football Researchers Association (PFRA) named Harris to the PFRA Hall of Very Good Class of 2011.

Harris finished his ten NFL seasons with 29 interceptions, which he returned for 281 yards and one touchdown, and 16 fumble recoveries, which he returned for 91 yards. He also was used in special teams during the first half of his career, gaining 418 yards on punt returns and 1,622 yards returning kickoffs, with a yards per kick return average of 25.7.

On January 15, 2020, Harris was elected to the Pro Football Hall of Fame Class of 2020.

== Cliff Harris Award ==
The Cliff Harris Award is presented to the top defensive player in the country representing Division II, III and NAIA colleges and universities. The Selection Committee includes Roger Staubach, Lee Roy Jordan, Walt Garrison, Gene Stallings, Jackie Smith, Drew Pearson, Rayfield Wright, Everson Walls, Charlie Waters, Bill Bates, Gil Brandt, Mel Renfro, Jim Hart and Harris himself.

The inaugural winner of the Cliff Harris Award in 2013 was defensive back Pierre Desir from Lindenwood University in St. Charles, Missouri. Desir was featured in ESPN's Draft Academy and was selected in the fourth round by the Cleveland Browns. Receiving the 2014 award was Darius Allen, a senior defensive end from Colorado State University-Pueblo who helped the Thunderwolves to their first-ever NCAA Division II national championship. The 2015 recipient was Marquis Christian, a former safety at Midwestern State University. The recipient of the award in 2016 was Conner Harris, senior linebacker at Lindenwood University and the top tackler in the history of college football.

== Cliff Harris Stadium ==
In 2014, OBU honored Harris by naming its new football stadium "Cliff Harris Stadium." The stadium, decked in the school's purple and gold colors, greets visitors approaching the OBU campus and includes more than 500 reserved and premium reserved seats as part of its total seating capacity. Ouachita football, whose mascot is the Tiger, has a rich tradition dating back to 1895 and competes in the Great American Conference in NCAA Division II.

== Personal life ==
Harris lives in Rockwall, Texas with his wife Karen and six children, three daughters and three sons. Cliff Harris is the author of Captain Crash and the Dallas Cowboys: From Sideline to Goal Line With Cliff Harris, first published in 2006 and re-released in September 2014. He and teammate Charlie Waters co-authored a book about their Cowboy memories called Tales From the Dallas Cowboys. Outside football, he works in the energy business.
