= Super Bowl Most Valuable Player =

Award presented during the NFL's championship game

Super Bowl MVP
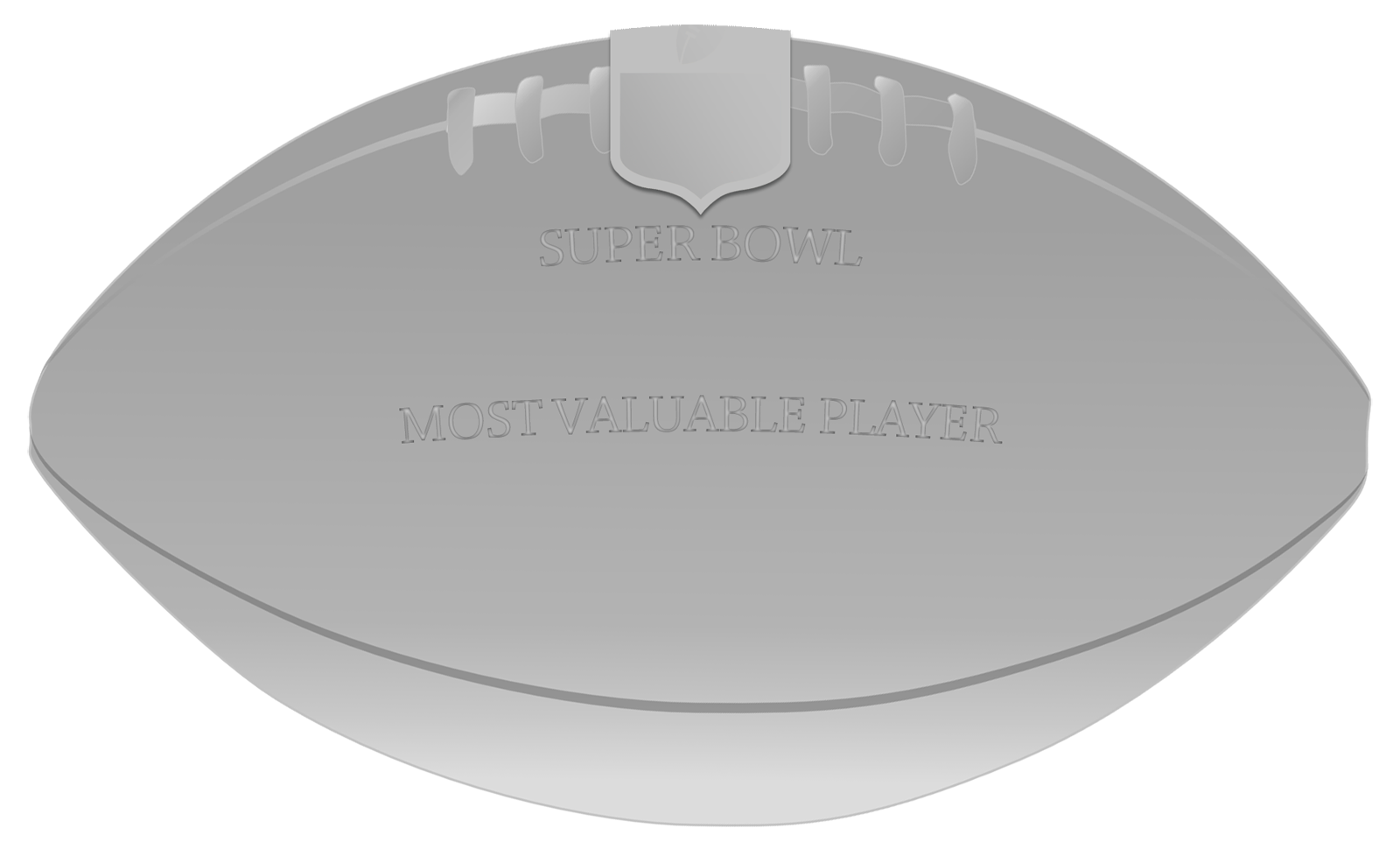
- The Pete Rozelle Trophy
- Awarded for: Most valuable player of the Super Bowl
- Presented by: SPORT (1967–1989); NFL (1990–present)

History
- First award: 1967
- Most wins: Tom Brady (5)
- Most recent: Kenneth Walker III

The Super Bowl Most Valuable Player (MVP) award is presented annually to the most valuable player of the Super Bowl, the National Football League's (NFL) championship game. The winner is chosen by a panel of 16 football writers and broadcasters, and, since Super Bowl XXXV in 2001, fans voting electronically. The media panel's ballots count for 80 percent of the vote tally, while the viewers' ballots make up the other 20 percent. The game's viewing audience can vote on the Internet, or by using cell phones. Media voters are asked to vote with about five minutes remaining in the game, but are allowed to change their mind when the game ends. They can nominate one player from each team, with instructions to count their vote for the player on the winning team. Voters cannot select an entire unit.

The Super Bowl MVP has been awarded annually since the game's inception in 1967. Through 1989, the award was presented by Sport magazine. Bart Starr was the MVP of the first two Super Bowls. Since 1990, the award has been presented by the NFL. At Super Bowl XXV, the league first awarded the Pete Rozelle Trophy, named after former NFL commissioner Pete Rozelle, to the Super Bowl MVP. Ottis Anderson was the first to win the trophy. The most recent Super Bowl MVP, from Super Bowl LX, is Seattle Seahawks running back Kenneth Walker III.

Tom Brady is the only player to have won five Super Bowl MVP awards (four with the New England Patriots and one with the Tampa Bay Buccaneers); Joe Montana and Patrick Mahomes won three times and three other players—Bart Starr, Terry Bradshaw and Eli Manning—have won the award twice. Starr, Bradshaw, and Mahomes are the only ones to have won it in back-to-back years. The MVP has come from the winning team every year except 1971, when Dallas Cowboys linebacker Chuck Howley won the award, despite the Cowboys' loss in Super Bowl V to the Baltimore Colts. Harvey Martin and Randy White were named co-MVPs of Super Bowl XII, the only time co-MVPs have been chosen. Including the Super Bowl XII co-MVPs, seven Cowboys players have won Super Bowl MVP awards, the most of any NFL team. Quarterbacks have earned the honor 34 times in 59 games (and 60 awards).

From Super Bowl I to Super Bowl XLIX the Super Bowl MVP won a new car as a part of their MVP award. However, since Hyundai became the official vehicle partner of the NFL, from the 2015 NFL season onward no new car has been awarded to the Super Bowl MVP since Super Bowl 50.

== Winners ==
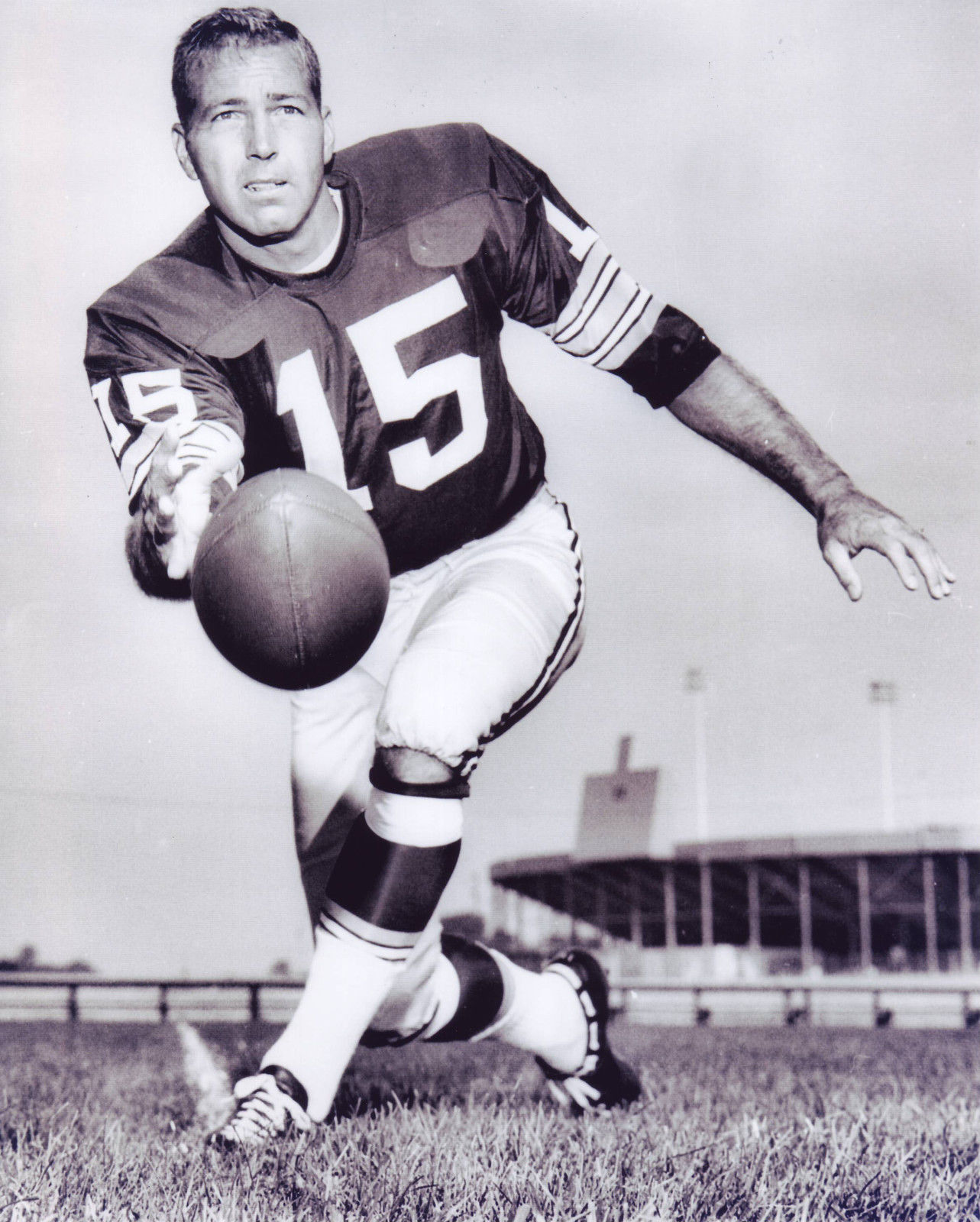
Bart Starr was the MVP of Super Bowls I and II while quarterback for the Green Bay Packers

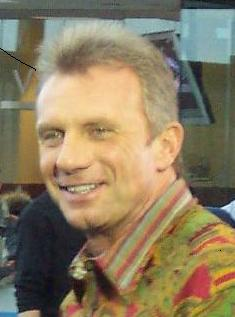
Joe Montana won three Super Bowl MVP awards as quarterback for the San Francisco 49ers

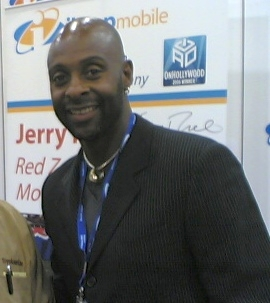
Jerry Rice, the MVP of Super Bowl XXIII, played wide receiver for the San Francisco 49ers

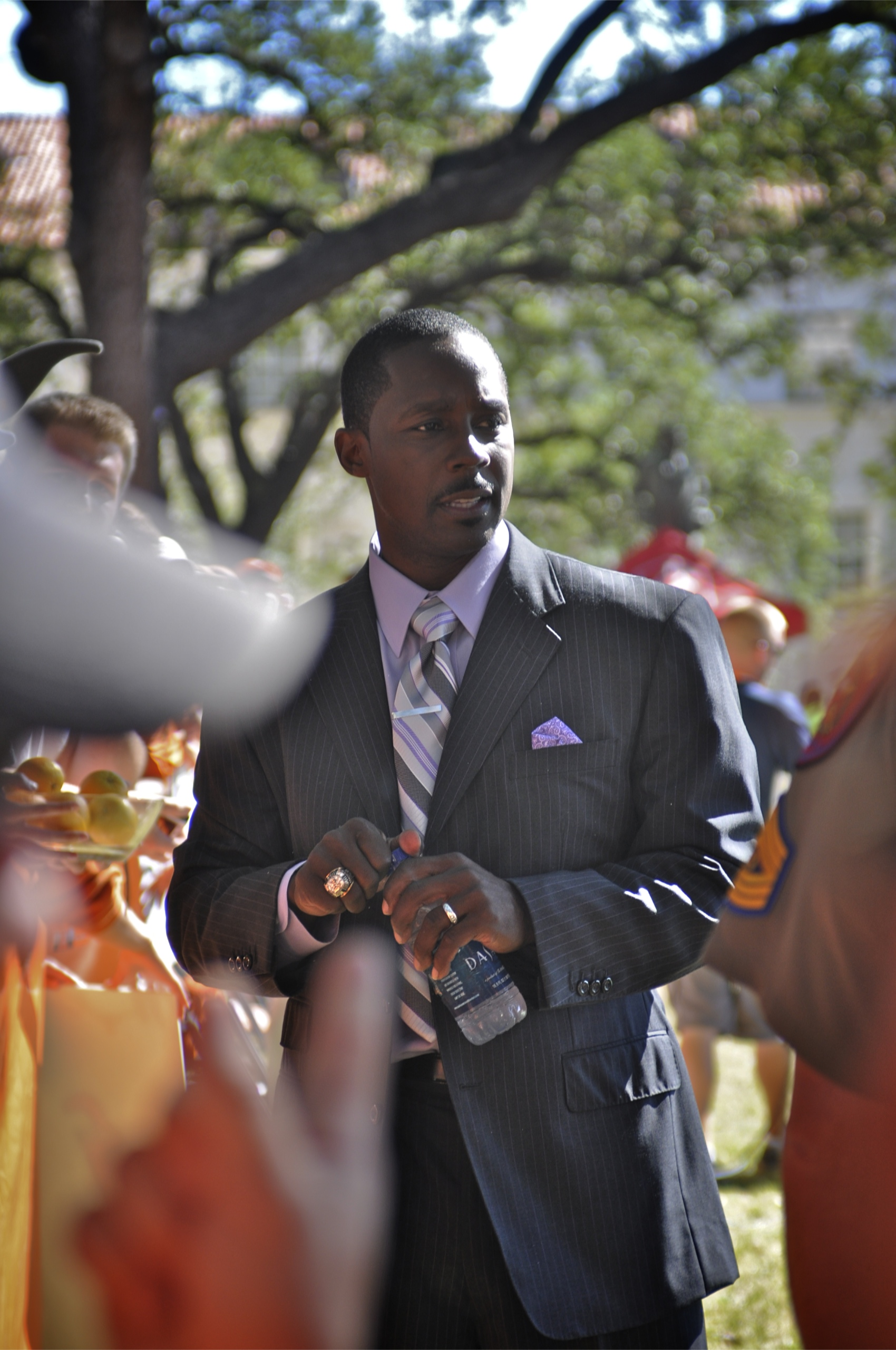
Desmond Howard, MVP of Super Bowl XXXI with the Green Bay Packers, is the only special teams player – a kick/punt returner – to win the award

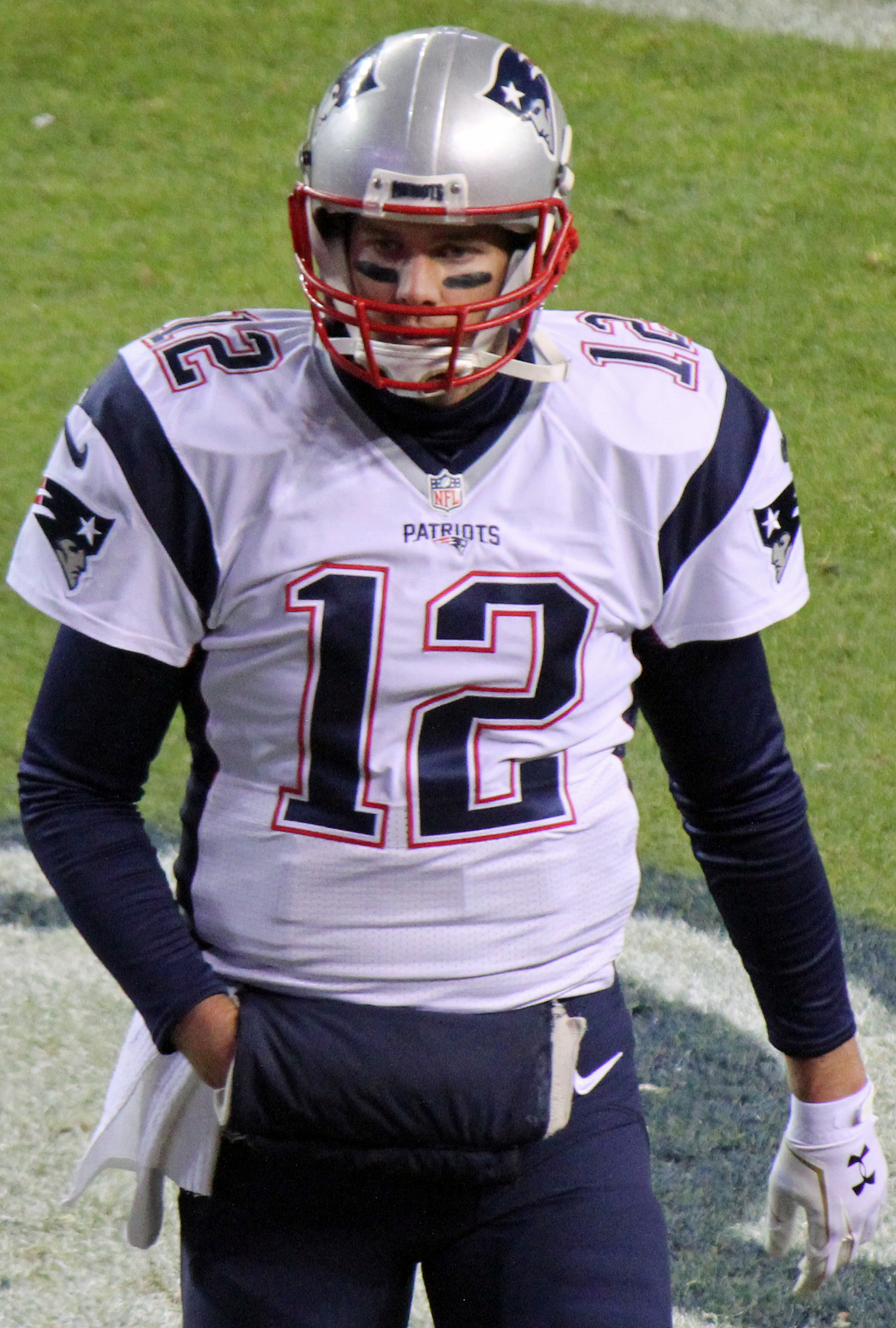
Tom Brady, a quarterback, has the most MVP awards with five, winning in Super Bowls XXXVI, XXXVIII, XLIX, and LI while playing for the New England Patriots and Super Bowl LV playing for the Tampa Bay Buccaneers

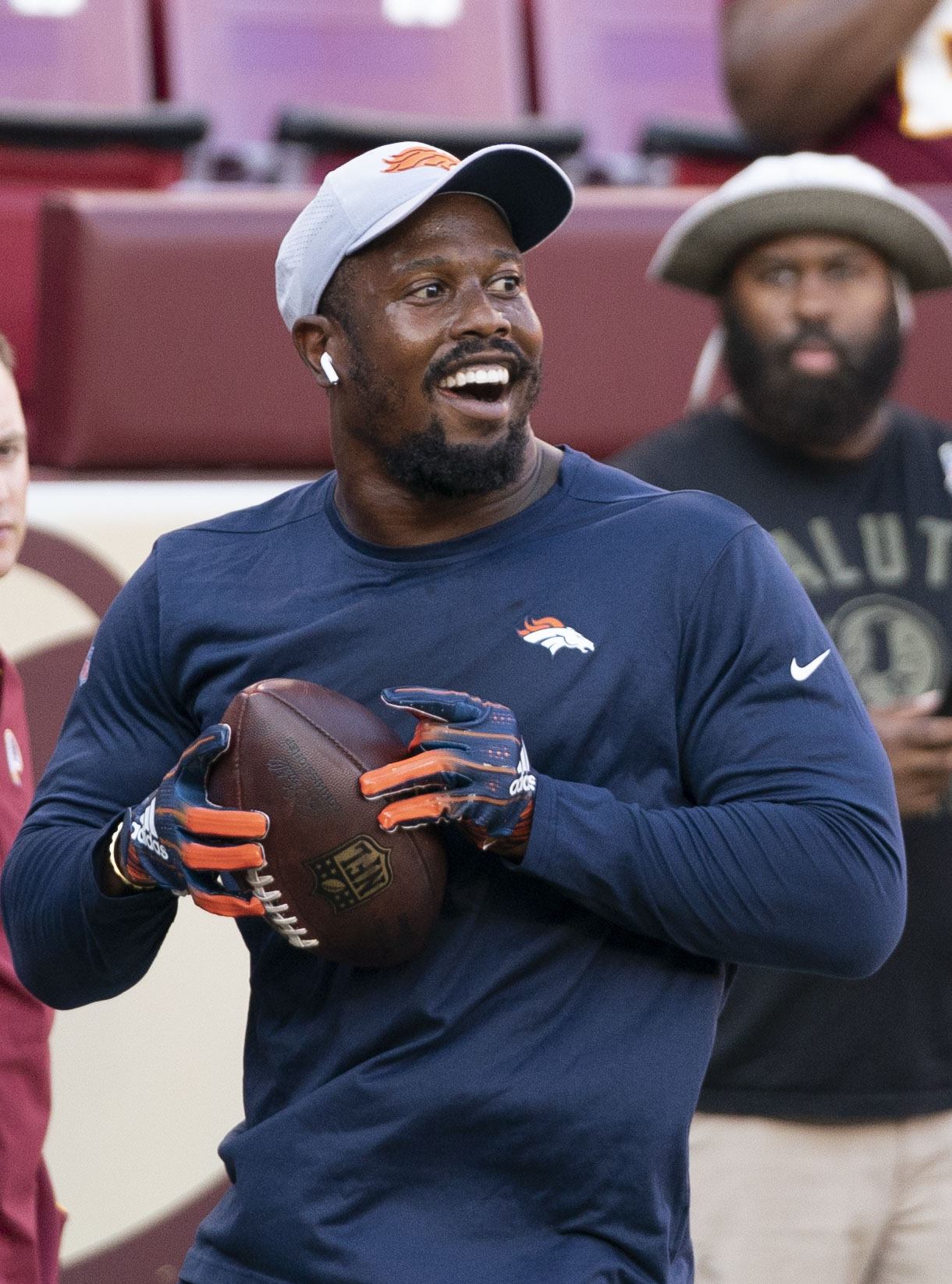
Von Miller, MVP of Super Bowl 50 with the Denver Broncos, is the most recent defensive player – a linebacker – to win the award

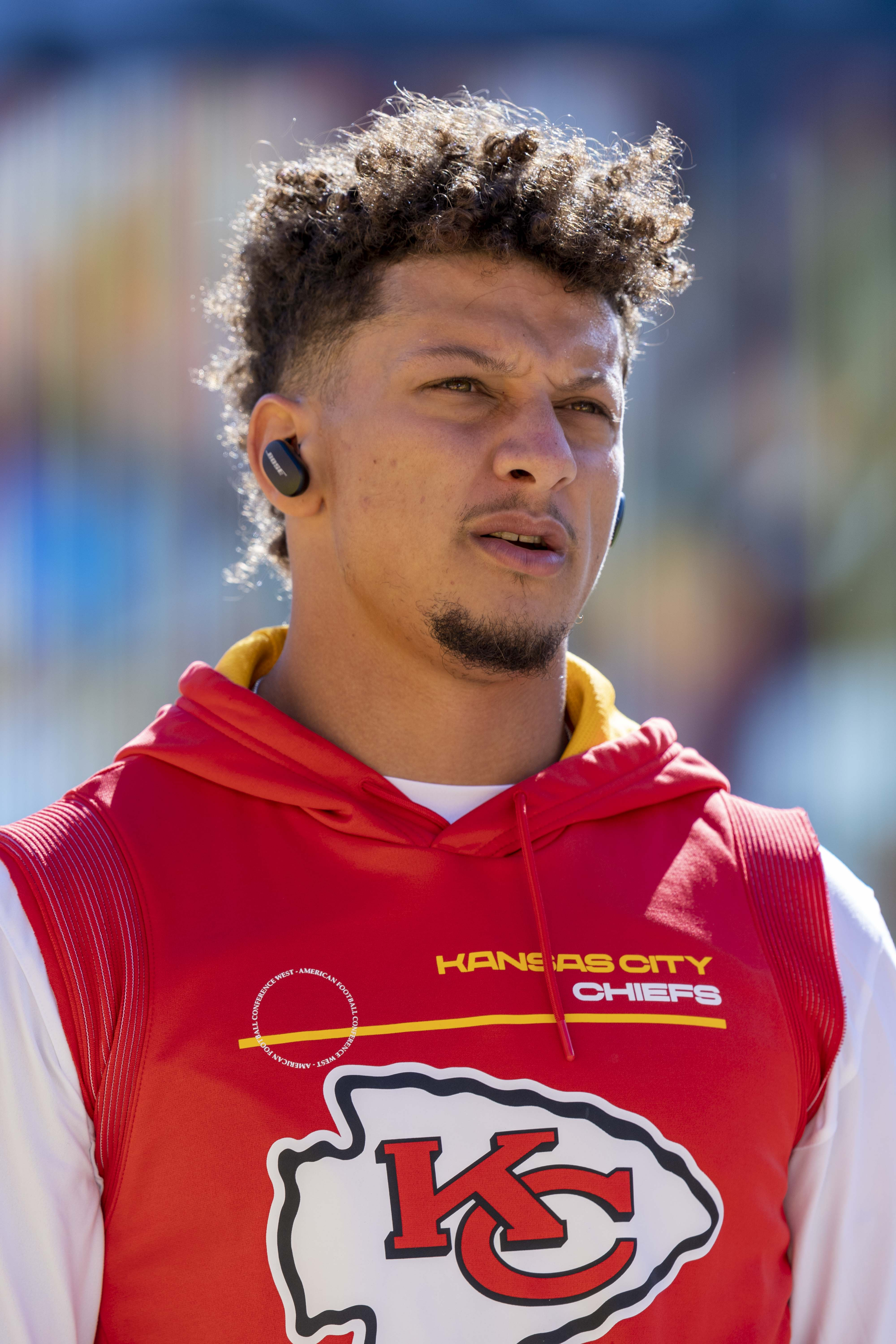
Patrick Mahomes, a quarterback, won three MVP awards in Super Bowls LIV, LVII, and LVIII while playing for the Kansas City Chiefs

Key for the below tables
Symbol	Description
Year	Each year is linked to an article about that particular NFL season
Winner (#)	Denotes number of times the player has won the award
†	Player still active in NFL
*	Player elected to the Pro Football Hall of Fame
‡	Player is not yet eligible for Pro Football Hall of Fame
§	Player's team lost the Super Bowl
Team (#)	Denotes number of times the team has won the award
Position (#)	Denotes number of times the position has won the award

Super Bowl Most Valuable Players
Year (Note: Years listed are the year the Super Bowl was actually played. The game, played in January or February, ends the previous year's NFL season. For example, Super Bowl XLIX, held on February 1, 2015, ended the 2014 season.)	Super Bowl	Winner	Team	Position	College	Ref.
1967	I	Bart Starr^{*}	Green Bay Packers	Quarterback	Alabama	
1968	II	Bart Starr (2)^{*}	Green Bay Packers (2)	Quarterback (2)	Alabama	
1969	III	Joe Namath^{*}	New York Jets	Quarterback (3)	Alabama	
1970	IV	Len Dawson^{*}	Kansas City Chiefs	Quarterback (4)	Purdue	
1971	V	Chuck Howley^{*}	Dallas Cowboys^{§}	Linebacker	West Virginia	
1972	VI	Roger Staubach^{*}	Dallas Cowboys (2)	Quarterback (5)	Navy	
1973	VII	Jake Scott	Miami Dolphins	Safety	Georgia	
1974	VIII	Larry Csonka^{*}	Miami Dolphins (2)	Running back	Syracuse	
1975	IX	Franco Harris^{*}	Pittsburgh Steelers	Running back (2)	Penn State	
1976	X	Lynn Swann^{*}	Pittsburgh Steelers (2)	Wide receiver	USC	
1977	XI	Fred Biletnikoff^{*}	Oakland Raiders	Wide receiver (2)	Florida State	
1978	XII	Harvey Martin (Note: Harvey Martin and Randy White were named co-MVPs of Super Bowl XII, the only Super Bowl with co-MVPs.)	Dallas Cowboys (3, 4)	Defensive end	Texas A&M–Commerce	
1978	XII	Randy White^{*}	Dallas Cowboys (3, 4)	Defensive tackle	Maryland	
1979	XIII	Terry Bradshaw^{*}	Pittsburgh Steelers (3)	Quarterback (6)	Louisiana Tech	
1980	XIV	Terry Bradshaw (2)^{*}	Pittsburgh Steelers (4)	Quarterback (7)	Louisiana Tech	
1981	XV	Jim Plunkett	Oakland Raiders (2)	Quarterback (8)	Stanford	
1982	XVI	Joe Montana^{*}	San Francisco 49ers	Quarterback (9)	Notre Dame	
1983	XVII	John Riggins^{*}	Washington Redskins	Running back (3)	Kansas	
1984	XVIII	Marcus Allen^{*}	Los Angeles Raiders (3)	Running back (4)	USC	
1985	XIX	Joe Montana (2)^{*}	San Francisco 49ers (2)	Quarterback (10)	Notre Dame	
1986	XX	Richard Dent^{*}	Chicago Bears	Defensive end (2)	Tennessee State	
1987	XXI	Phil Simms	New York Giants	Quarterback (11)	Morehead State	
1988	XXII	Doug Williams	Washington Redskins (2)	Quarterback (12)	Grambling State	
1989	XXIII	Jerry Rice^{*}	San Francisco 49ers (3)	Wide receiver (3)	Mississippi Valley State	
1990	XXIV	Joe Montana (3)^{*}	San Francisco 49ers (4)	Quarterback (13)	Notre Dame	
1991	XXV	Ottis Anderson	New York Giants (2)	Running back (5)	Miami (FL)	
1992	XXVI	Mark Rypien	Washington Redskins (3)	Quarterback (14)	Washington State	
1993	XXVII	Troy Aikman^{*}	Dallas Cowboys (5)	Quarterback (15)	UCLA	
1994	XXVIII	Emmitt Smith^{*}	Dallas Cowboys (6)	Running back (6)	Florida	
1995	XXIX	Steve Young^{*}	San Francisco 49ers (5)	Quarterback (16)	BYU	
1996	XXX	Larry Brown	Dallas Cowboys (7)	Cornerback	TCU	
1997	XXXI	Desmond Howard	Green Bay Packers (3)	Return specialist	Michigan	
1998	XXXII	Terrell Davis^{*}	Denver Broncos	Running back (7)	Georgia	
1999	XXXIII	John Elway^{*}	Denver Broncos (2)	Quarterback (17)	Stanford	
2000	XXXIV	Kurt Warner^{*}	St. Louis Rams	Quarterback (18)	Northern Iowa	
2001	XXXV	Ray Lewis^{*}	Baltimore Ravens	Linebacker (2)	Miami (FL)	
2002	XXXVI	Tom Brady^{‡}	New England Patriots	Quarterback (19)	Michigan	
2003	XXXVII	Dexter Jackson	Tampa Bay Buccaneers	Safety (2)	Florida State	
2004	XXXVIII	Tom Brady (2)^{‡}	New England Patriots (2)	Quarterback (20)	Michigan	
2005	XXXIX	Deion Branch	New England Patriots (3)	Wide receiver (4)	Louisville	
2006	XL	Hines Ward	Pittsburgh Steelers (5)	Wide receiver (5)	Georgia	
2007	XLI	Peyton Manning^{*}	Indianapolis Colts	Quarterback (21)	Tennessee	
2008	XLII	Eli Manning	New York Giants (3)	Quarterback (22)	Ole Miss	
2009	XLIII	Santonio Holmes	Pittsburgh Steelers (6)	Wide receiver (6)	Ohio State	
2010	XLIV	Drew Brees^{*}	New Orleans Saints	Quarterback (23)	Purdue	
2011	XLV	Aaron Rodgers^{†}	Green Bay Packers (4)	Quarterback (24)	California	
2012	XLVI	Eli Manning (2)	New York Giants (4)	Quarterback (25)	Ole Miss	
2013	XLVII	Joe Flacco^{†}	Baltimore Ravens (2)	Quarterback (26)	Delaware	
2014	XLVIII	Malcolm Smith^{‡}	Seattle Seahawks	Linebacker (3)	USC	
2015	XLIX	Tom Brady (3)^{‡}	New England Patriots (4)	Quarterback (27)	Michigan	
2016	50	Von Miller^{†}	Denver Broncos (3)	Linebacker (4)	Texas A&M	
2017	LI	Tom Brady (4)^{‡}	New England Patriots (5)	Quarterback (28)	Michigan	
2018	LII	Nick Foles^{‡}	Philadelphia Eagles	Quarterback (29)	Arizona	
2019	LIII	Julian Edelman^{‡}	New England Patriots (6)	Wide receiver (7)	Kent State	
2020	LIV	Patrick Mahomes^{†}	Kansas City Chiefs (2)	Quarterback (30)	Texas Tech	
2021	LV	Tom Brady (5) ^{‡}	Tampa Bay Buccaneers (2)	Quarterback (31)	Michigan	
2022	LVI	Cooper Kupp ^{†}	Los Angeles Rams (2)	Wide receiver (8)	Eastern Washington	
2023	LVII	Patrick Mahomes (2) ^{†}	Kansas City Chiefs (3)	Quarterback (32)	Texas Tech	
2024	LVIII	Patrick Mahomes (3) ^{†}	Kansas City Chiefs (4)	Quarterback (33)	Texas Tech	
2025	LIX	Jalen Hurts ^{†}	Philadelphia Eagles (2)	Quarterback (34)	Oklahoma	
2026	LX	Kenneth Walker III ^{†}	Seattle Seahawks (2)	Running back (8)	Michigan State	

=== By team ===
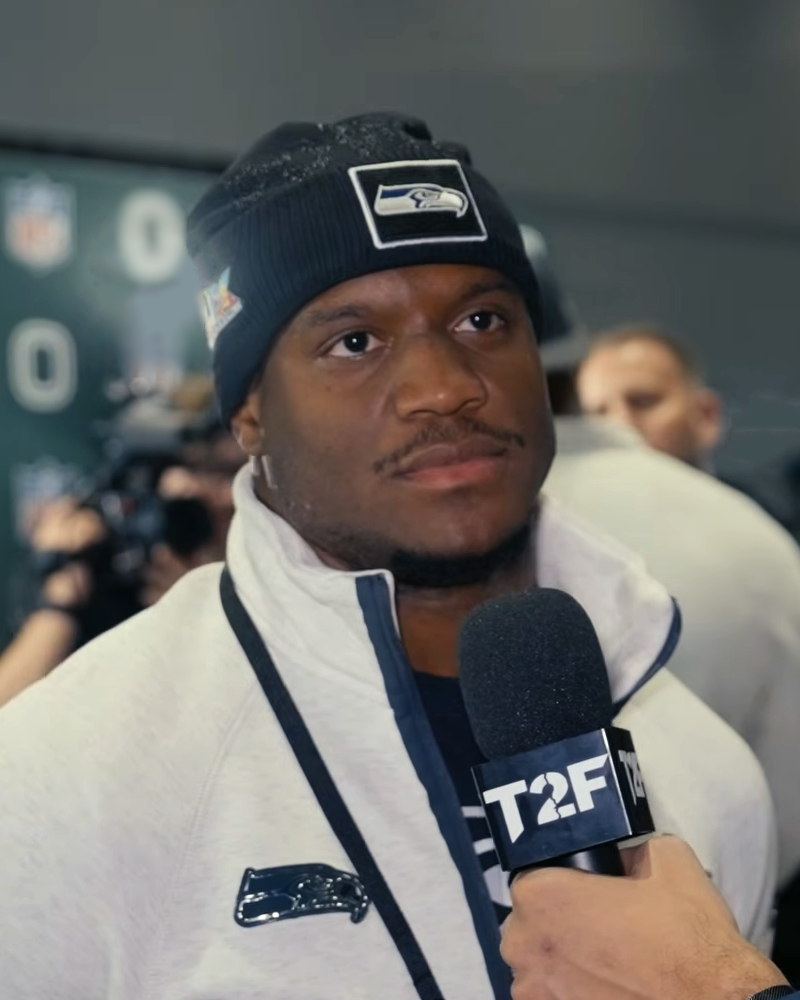
Running back Kenneth Walker III was the most recent recipient of the award after he led the Seattle Seahawks to a victory in Super Bowl LX

Super Bowl MVPs by team
Team	Total	Super Bowl(s)
Dallas Cowboys	7 (Note: The Cowboys' total includes the co-MVPs of Super Bowl XII as two different recipients. There were six Super Bowls where the Cowboys received MVP awards, including Super Bowl V, a game they lost to the Baltimore Colts.)	V, (Note: The Colts won Super Bowl V but the MVP was awarded to Chuck Howley of the Cowboys.) VI, XII, XXVII, XXVIII, XXX
Pittsburgh Steelers	6	IX, X, XIII, XIV, XL, XLIII
New England Patriots	6	XXXVI, XXXVIII, XXXIX, XLIX, LI, LIII
San Francisco 49ers	5	XVI, XIX, XXIII, XXIV, XXIX
Green Bay Packers	4	I, II, XXXI, XLV
New York Giants	4	XXI, XXV, XLII, XLVI
Kansas City Chiefs	4	IV, LIV, LVII, LVIII
Los Angeles/Oakland Raiders	3	XI, XV, XVIII
Washington Redskins/Commanders	3	XVII, XXII, XXVI
Denver Broncos	3	XXXII, XXXIII, 50
Miami Dolphins	2	VII, VIII
Baltimore Ravens	2	XXXV, XLVII
Tampa Bay Buccaneers	2	XXXVII, LV
St. Louis/Los Angeles Rams	2	XXXIV, LVI
Philadelphia Eagles	2	LII, LIX
Seattle Seahawks	2	XLVIII, LX
New York Jets	1	III
Chicago Bears	1	XX
Indianapolis Colts	1	XLI
New Orleans Saints	1	XLIV

=== By position ===
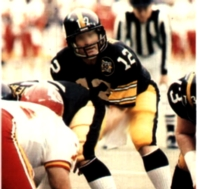
Terry Bradshaw was the MVP of Super Bowls XIII and XIV while quarterback for the Pittsburgh Steelers

Super Bowl MVPs by position
Position	Total	Last Won
Quarterback	34	2025
Wide receiver	8	2022
Running back	8	2026
Linebacker	4	2016
Defensive end	2	1986
Safety	2	2003
Cornerback	1	1996
Defensive tackle	1	1978
Kick returner/punt returner	1	1997

=== Multiple winners ===
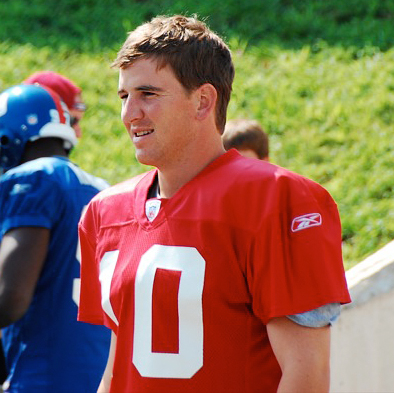
Quarterback Eli Manning was the MVP of Super Bowls XLII and XLVI while playing for the New York Giants

Player	Position	Team	Wins	Super Bowls
Tom Brady^{‡}	Quarterback	New England Patriots (4) / Tampa Bay Buccaneers (1)	5	XXXVI, XXXVIII, XLIX, LI, LV
Joe Montana^{*}	Quarterback	San Francisco 49ers	3	XVI, XIX, XXIV
Patrick Mahomes†	Quarterback	Kansas City Chiefs	3	LIV, LVII, LVIII
Bart Starr^{*}	Quarterback	Green Bay Packers	2	I, II
Terry Bradshaw^{*}	Quarterback	Pittsburgh Steelers	2	XIII, XIV
Eli Manning	Quarterback	New York Giants	2	XLII, XLVI

== See also ==
- List of Super Bowl starting quarterbacks
- List of Super Bowl champions
- List of Super Bowl head coaches
- List of Super Bowl officials
- List of NFL awards
