= Randy White (American football) =

American football player (born 1953)

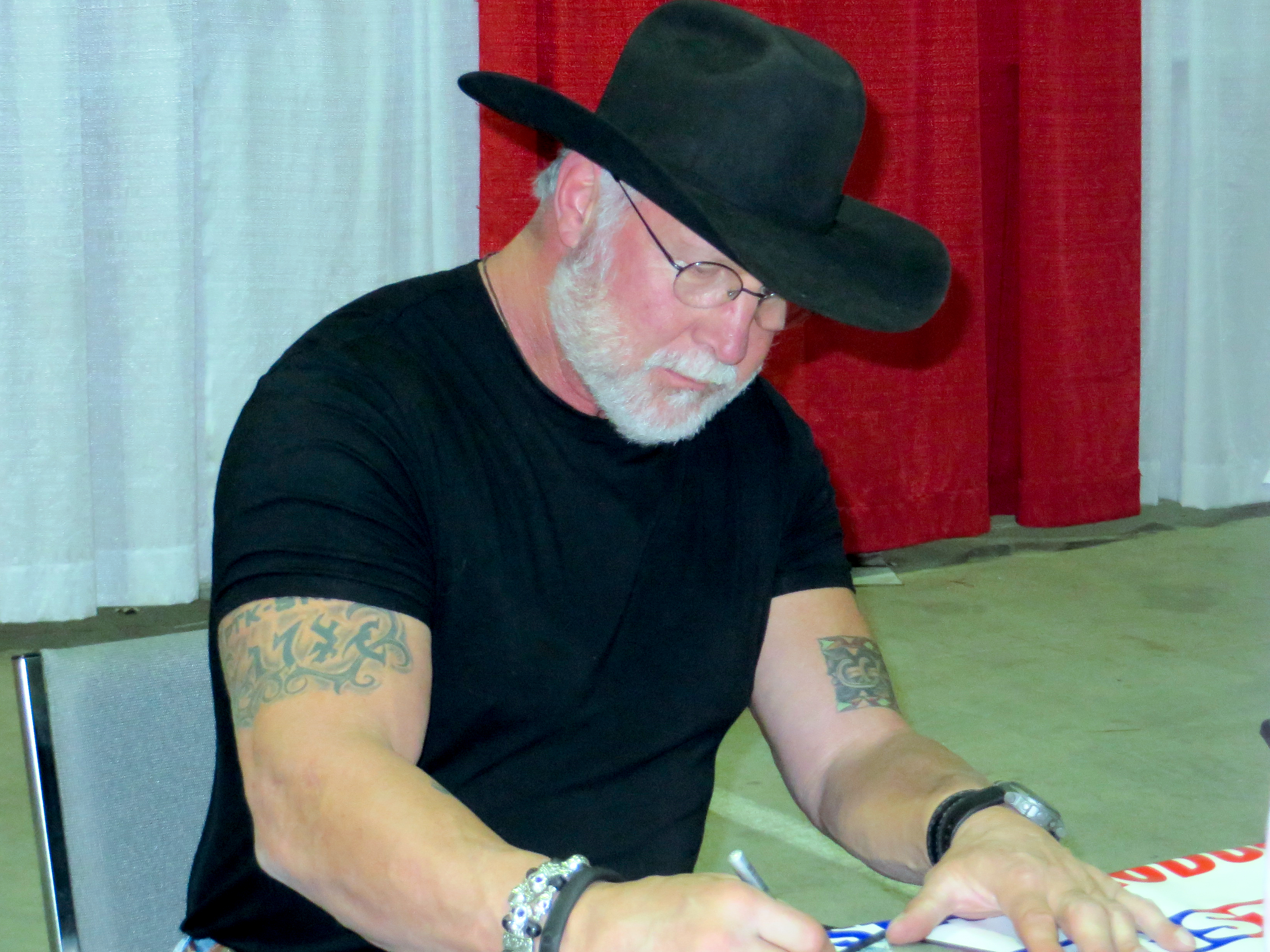
- White signs autographs in 2014

No. 54
- Position: Defensive tackle

Personal information
- Born: January 15, 1953 (age 73); Pittsburgh, Pennsylvania, U.S.
- Listed height: 6 ft 4 in (1.93 m)
- Listed weight: 257 lb (117 kg)

Career information
- High school: McKean (Wilmington, Delaware)
- College: Maryland (1972–1974)
- NFL draft: 1975: 1st round, 2nd overall pick

Career history
- Dallas Cowboys (1975–1988)

Awards and highlights
- Super Bowl champion (XII); Super Bowl MVP (XII) (Note: Co-winner with Harvey Martin); 8× First-team All-Pro (1978–1985); 9× Pro Bowl (1977–1985); NFL 1980s All-Decade Team; NFL 100th Anniversary All-Time Team; PFWA All-Rookie Team (1975); Dallas Cowboys Ring of Honor; Lombardi Award (1974); Outland Trophy (1974); UPI Lineman of the Year (1974); Unanimous All-American (1974); First-team All-American (1973); ACC Player of the Year (1974); 2× First-team All-ACC (1973, 1974); First-team AP All-Time All-American (2025)

Career NFL statistics
- Sacks: 111
- Interceptions: 1
- Stats at Pro Football Reference
- Pro Football Hall of Fame
- College Football Hall of Fame

Randall Lee White (born January 15, 1953), nicknamed "the Manster", is an American former professional football player who was a defensive tackle for the Dallas Cowboys in the National Football League (NFL) from 1975 to 1988. He played college football for the Maryland Terrapins from 1972 to 1974. He is a member of the College Football Hall of Fame (1994), the Pro Football Hall of Fame (1994) and the Delaware Sports Hall of Fame (1994).

== Early life ==
Playing both defensive end and linebacker at Thomas McKean High School in Wilmington, Delaware, White is considered to this day the "Best All-Time Player" in the history of Delaware high school football. Graduating in 1971, he was a star player in the state's 15th annual Blue-Gold All-Star high school football game played each year since 1956 at the University of Delaware stadium to benefit DFRC and its programs to provide services to Delawareans with intellectual disabilities.

== College career ==
White was recruited by the University of Maryland and played as a fullback for the Terrapins during his freshman year. Maryland finished the year with only two wins and White did little worth noting during that year. During his sophomore season, new head coach Jerry Claiborne moved White to defensive end, noting that he had the skill to be "one of the best five linemen in the U.S." The move was a natural fit, as by his senior year, he was, as Claiborne put it, "as fast as some of the offensive backs I had coached." In that senior year (1974), he won numerous awards and honors, including the Outland Trophy, the Lombardi Award, and the Atlantic Coast Conference Player of the Year. Though Maryland lost in the Liberty Bowl that season to Tennessee, White was named the game's Most Valuable Player. In 1994, he was elected to the College Football Hall of Fame and in 2000 was named to ABC sports All-time All-America Team. In 1999, Sports Illustrated included him on its All-Century Team for college football.

== Professional career ==
White was the Dallas Cowboys' first pick and the second player selected in the 1975 NFL draft. He was moved to middle linebacker, where he was a backup to Cowboy legend Lee Roy Jordan, playing mostly on special teams his first two seasons, including his rookie season when Dallas lost to the Pittsburgh Steelers in Super Bowl X. Jordan retired following the 1976 season, and his slot was filled by Bob Breunig, who held the position the next nine seasons. During his third season (1977), White was moved to right defensive tackle, the same position formerly occupied by "Mr. Cowboy", Bob Lilly, from 1961 through 1974, a move which in turn moved veteran Larry Cole back to his natural defensive end position (backing up Ed "Too Tall" Jones and Harvey Martin, though he did play left defensive tackle after the retirement of Jethro Pugh.

That year proved to be his breakout year; he was named to his first All-Pro team, his first Pro Bowl, and (on his 25th birthday) was named co-MVP of Super Bowl XII with teammate Harvey Martin, making him one of ten defensive players to win that honor. In 1978, White was named the NFC Defensive Player of the Year, and was named to nine consecutive All-Pro and Pro Bowl teams. He retired in 1988 (coincidentally, also the last season on the sidelines for original Cowboys coach Tom Landry), having played 209 games in 14 seasons, missing only one game during that span. At the time of his retirement, he had played the second most of any Dallas Cowboy in history. During those 14 years, he played in three Super Bowls, six NFC Championship Games, and accumulated 1,104 tackles (701 solo) and 111 sacks. His highest single season sack total was 16 in 1978. He was elected to the Pro Football Hall of Fame in 1994. On the occasion of the 35th anniversary of the naming of the only co-MVPs in Super Bowl history, Super Bowl XLVII, which like Super Bowl XII was played in New Orleans, Louisiana, was dedicated to White. Harvey Martin had died in 2001.

Gradually, the accumulation of injuries began to limit White's effectiveness. He was credited with only 64 tackles in the 1987 season (a season in which White made the controversial choice to cross the picket line during the players' strike); this followed shoulder surgery the previous year and a bulging disc in his neck that worsened. In 1988, he played in a backup role, not assuming a three-point stance because of the disability. White openly and honestly acknowledged his frustration that he could no longer play at the level to which he was accustomed, and he decided to retire after the 1988 season.

== Personal life ==
White married Dallas model Vicci Haney, in 1978. They have one child together, daughter Jordan.

White is nicknamed "The Manster" (half man, half monster). He studied Thai Boxing under Chai Sirisute, the founder of the Thai Boxing Association of the US. White's round kick reportedly registered 400 psi on a gauge after two months of training.
