= Benny Barnes =

American football player (born 1951)

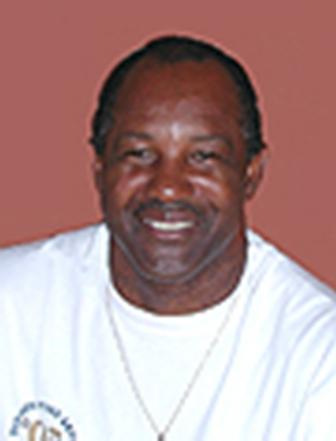
- Barnes at Contra Costa College

No. 31
- Position: Cornerback / Safety

Personal information
- Born: March 3, 1951 (age 75); Lufkin, Texas, U.S.
- Listed height: 6 ft 1 in (1.85 m)
- Listed weight: 190 lb (86 kg)

Career information
- High school: John F. Kennedy (Richmond, California)
- College: Stanford, Contra Costa (JC)
- NFL draft: 1972: undrafted

Career history
- Dallas Cowboys (1972–1982); Oakland Invaders (USFL) (1984)*
- * Offseason or practice squad member only

Awards and highlights
- Super Bowl champion (XII); Stanford All-Century Team

Career NFL statistics
- Games played: 138
- Games started: 78
- Interceptions: 11
- Fumble recoveries: 10
- Stats at Pro Football Reference

Benny Jewell Barnes (born March 3, 1951) is an American former professional football player who was a cornerback in the National Football League for eleven seasons, all with the Dallas Cowboys. He played college football for the Stanford Cardinals in the Pacific-8 Conference.

== Early life ==
After attending John F. Kennedy High School in Richmond, California, he moved on to Contra Costa College in nearby San Pablo, where he was an all-conference linebacker for the football team and also an all-conference track and field athlete.

In 1970, Barnes transferred across the Bay to Stanford, where he was converted from linebacker to free safety. He was a two-year starter (24 consecutive starts) and a part of the “Thunder Chickens” defense, that was very effective (9 of the 11 starters played professional football).

In 1971, Barnes posted seven interceptions (three against Sonny Sixkiller at the University of Washington) and was an honorable-mention (second-team) All-Pac-8 selection as a senior.

He contributed to teams led by quarterbacks Jim Plunkett and Don Bunce in two of the biggest upset victories ever in the Rose Bowl, in January 1971 and 1972, respectively.

Although he played just two years, Barnes was inducted into the Stanford Athletic Hall of Fame and selected to the Stanford's All-Century Team. In 2011, he was inducted into the California Community College Athletic Association Hall of Fame.

== Professional career ==
=== Dallas Cowboys ===
In 1972, he was signed as an undrafted free agent by the Super Bowl champion Dallas Cowboys, and made the team based on his excellent special teams play on punt and kickoff coverage.

In 1974, he was named the special teams captain and by the end of the season he was a starter at left cornerback, but fractured his right ankle and foot against the Cleveland Browns, an injury that would affect him the rest of his career (three surgeries). The next year, he was used on passing downs as the fifth or sixth defensive back and started 3 games.

In 1976, he regained the starter position at left cornerback in the fifth game after Mark Washington suffered 2 concussions at the beginning of the season.

Although he didn't have great athletic ability, he compensated with technique, instincts and effort, which made him and underrated part of the team. In 1977, he was the starter for the Super Bowl XII winning team.

His best season came in 1978, although he missed three games with ankle and foot problems, he led the team with 5 interceptions, while still excelling on special teams. In Super Bowl XIII he was involved in one of the most controversial calls in Super Bowl history, when Lynn Swann ran up his back and both fell, resulting in a pass interference that gave the Pittsburgh Steelers the ball deep in Cowboys territory and an eventual crucial touchdown. NFL Commissioner Pete Rozelle, would later concede that the official call was wrong.

In 1979, despite a sore right foot that affected him since 1975, he tied for the team lead in interceptions and fumble recoveries (including one returned for a 33-yard touchdown). In the offseason he underwent a joint fusion surgery on his chronically sore right foot.

In 1980, he missed the first five games after having an appendectomy in the morning of the season opener. The Cowboys went 12–4 in the regular season with Barnes (6 games) and Steve Wilson (10 games) sharing the left cornerback position.

The next season, Barnes was moved to strong safety, to improve the depth after the retirement of Charlie Waters and to make room for undrafted free agent Everson Walls. He played as a third-down specialist and had a 72-yard fumble return for a touchdown in October at San Francisco.

Barnes was waived in August 1983 at the end of training camp, and replaced with undrafted free agent Bill Bates.

=== Oakland Invaders (USFL) ===
On January 14, 1984, he signed with the Oakland Invaders of the USFL, reuniting with John Ralston, his former head coach at Stanford, but was released before the season started.

Barnes retired after an 11-year NFL career, where he was part of eight NFC Championship Games and three Super Bowls. He is considered to be one of the best special teams players in Dallas Cowboys history.

== Personal life ==
Barnes spent some time investing in restaurants and worked at Contra Costa College as equipment manager. He is currently married, with three sons and one daughter.
