= Charlie Waters =

American football player (born 1948)

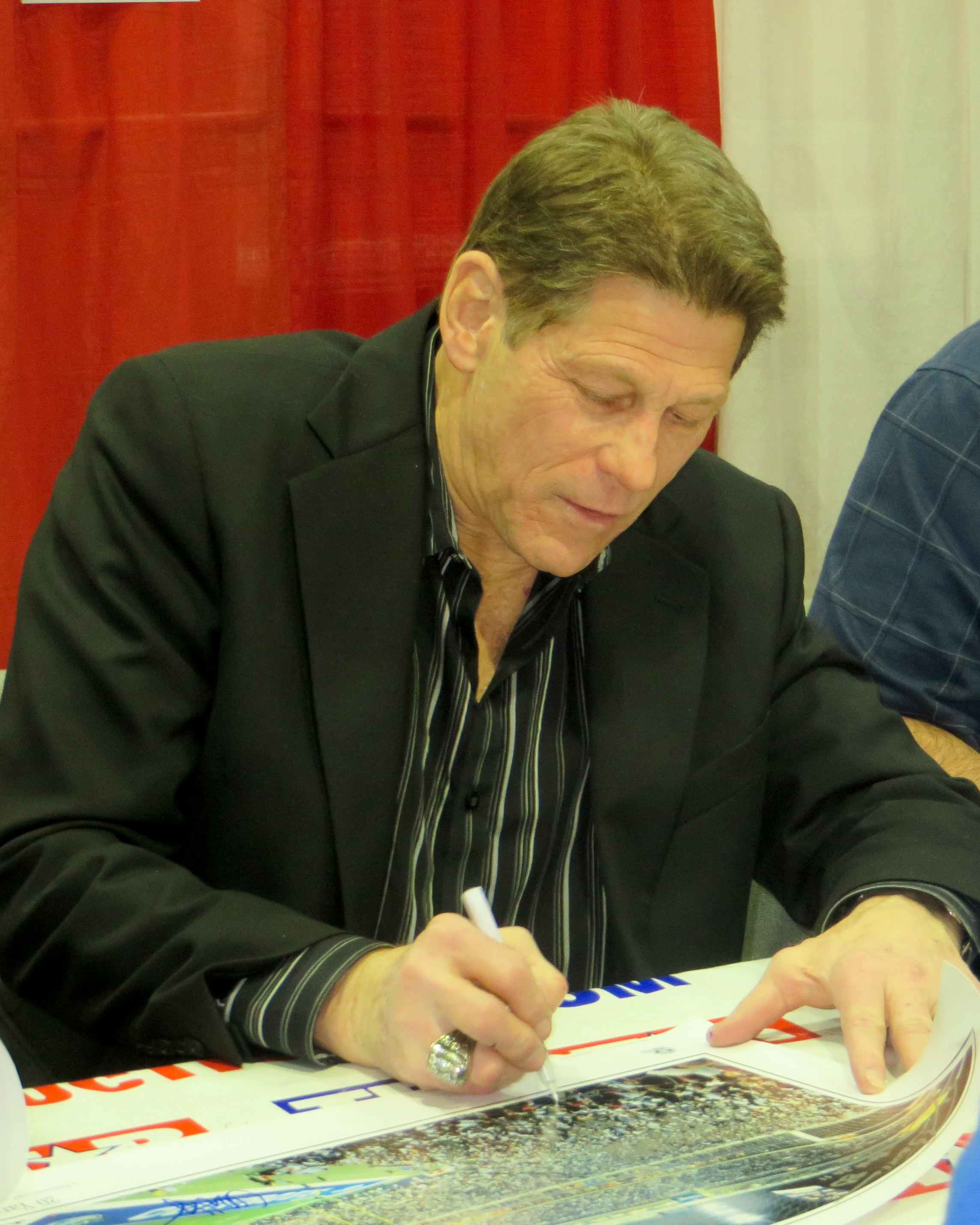
- Waters in 2014

No. 41
- Position: Safety

Personal information
- Born: September 10, 1948 (age 78); Miami, Florida, U.S.
- Listed height: 6 ft 1 in (1.85 m)
- Listed weight: 193 lb (88 kg)

Career information
- High school: North Augusta (North Augusta, South Carolina)
- College: Clemson
- NFL draft: 1970: 3rd round, 66th overall pick

Career history
- Dallas Cowboys (1970–1981)

Awards and highlights
- 2× Super Bowl champion (VI, XII); 2× Second-team All-Pro (1977, 1978); 3× Pro Bowl (1976–1978); NFL All-rookie team (1970); First-team All-ACC (1969)

Career NFL statistics
- Games played: 160
- Interceptions: 41
- Interception yards: 584
- Interception TDs: 2
- Fumble recoveries: 7
- Stats at Pro Football Reference
- Coaching profile at Pro Football Reference

Charlie Tutan Waters (born September 10, 1948) is an American former professional football player who spent his entire 12-year career as a safety for the Dallas Cowboys of the National Football League (NFL). He played college football for the Clemson Tigers.

== Early life ==
Born in Miami, Florida, Waters' family moved to South Carolina where he attended North Augusta High School, starring as a football and baseball athlete.

He was a split end early in his football career before being converted to a quarterback. He was selected to play in the 1965 Shrine Bowl and graduated in 1966.

== College career ==
Waters signed a football scholarship at Clemson University. As a junior in 1968, he competed with Billy Ammons for the starting quarterback job, winning it after Ammons hurt his knee in spring practice. After a 0–3–1 start, Ammons was made starting quarterback again and Waters moved to split end for the remaining 15 games of his college career. As a senior, he caught 44 passes for 738 yards, and even though his season was cut short with a shoulder separation, his record stood until Jerry Butler broke it in 1977.

A three-year letterman, Waters was an All-ACC selection in 1969 at wide receiver as a senior. During his Clemson career, he caught 68 passes for 1,196 yards and 17.1 yards per catch, to go along with four touchdown receptions. He still ranks eighth all-time for yards per reception and eighteenth all-time in receiving yards.

In 1981, he was inducted into the Clemson Athletic Hall of Fame. He was also inducted into the North Augusta Sports Hall of Fame and the South Carolina Athletic Hall of Fame.

== Professional career ==
Waters was selected by the Dallas Cowboys as a defensive back in the third round (66th overall) of the 1970 NFL draft. Although he was nearly released during training camp, his conversion was successful, and he became the backup to Cliff Harris at free safety as a rookie in 1970. He ended up starting 6 games after Harris had to serve military duty. Waters had 5 interceptions that season, as the Cowboys went on to lose Super Bowl V. His performance was good enough to make the NFL all-rookie team in 1970.

The next year, he was moved to cornerback, where he struggled for four years in a backup and starter role. Waters was eventually moved to strong safety in 1975 to replace Cowboys great Cornell Green, responding with 3 interceptions for 55 yards and a touchdown. That season, the Cowboys won the NFC Championship but lost Super Bowl X to the Pittsburgh Steelers.

As a strong safety he became an All-Pro, and along with Cliff Harris, formed one of the best safety tandems of that era. He was like a coach on the field, with the instincts and the athletic ability to become one of the league's top defensive players of the decade. He was selected All-Pro twice (1977 and 1978) and to the Pro Bowl three consecutive seasons (1976–1978).

In 1979, Waters suffered a torn anterior cruciate ligament (ACL) in his right knee during a preseason game against the Seattle Seahawks, forcing him to sit out the entire year. He returned in 1980 and had 5 interceptions. After getting 3 interceptions in 1981, he retired with 41 interceptions, third-most in franchise history. He played in 25 playoff games, which ranks 5th in NFL history.

Waters played 12 seasons in the NFL, never experienced a losing season and only missed the playoffs once (1974) during that span. He played in five Super Bowls: V, VI, X, XII, and XIII, with victories in VI and XII. He holds the NFL record for most playoff interceptions with 9, including 3 in one playoff game, and has the unique achievement of blocking 4 punts in 2 consecutive games. He also was the team's holder for placekicks.

== After retirement ==
Waters spent the 1983 season in the broadcast booth for CBS Sports, with Tom Brookshier on play-by-play. It was Waters who first admonished Brookshier after the latter commented during a college basketball promo in December that players for the Louisville Cardinals had "a collective IQ of about forty," resulting in Brookshier being removed from calling NFL games for the remainder of the season.

== Personal life ==
Waters retired and became an NFL and college football coach. He was the defensive coordinator for the Denver Broncos in 1993 and 1994, and then for the University of Oregon in 1995. Late that season, his oldest son Cody died in Eugene in his sleep on December 4, 1995, 12 days before his 18th birthday. He and his wife Rosie Holotik, actress and model, at the time had two more sons, Ben and Cliff (after Cliff Harris).

He was nominated for the Pro Football Hall of Fame in 2001, but was not elected.

In 2006, the Dallas Cowboys hired Waters as the new color commentator for the Cowboys Radio Network, working alongside Brad Sham when former color commentator and Dallas quarterback Babe Laufenberg resigned his post to spend time with his family.

Outside of football, he works with longtime teammate Cliff Harris at a gas marketing company. In February 2007, Waters announced that he would be leaving the radio booth after only one season, citing a busy work schedule that did not allow him enough time to prepare for the game broadcasts.
