= 1977 Denver Broncos season =

American football team season

- General manager: Fred Gehrke
- Head coach: Red Miller
- Home stadium: Mile High Stadium

Results
- Record: 12–2
- Division place: 1st AFC West
- Playoffs: Won Divisional Playoffs (vs. Steelers) 34–21; Won AFC Championship (vs. Raiders) 20–17; Lost Super Bowl XII (vs. Cowboys) 10–27

The 1977 Denver Broncos season (also known as the Broncomania season) was the team's 18th year in professional football and its eighth with the National Football League (NFL).

The team had what was then by far its best season at 12–2, finishing first in the AFC West, and making the playoffs for the first time in franchise history. The Broncos earned home field advantage, and won its first two playoff games (over perennial AFC powerhouses Pittsburgh and Oakland). With the AFC Championship win over the defending Super Bowl champion Raiders on New Year's Day, Denver earned a berth in Super Bowl XII, but fell 27–10 to the NFC champion Dallas Cowboys.

Despite the defeat in the Super Bowl, 1977 was a major leap for the Broncos, who had never won more than nine games in a season. Coach Red Miller, in his first season as the Broncos' head coach, was named NFL Coach of the Year. Quarterback Craig Morton, age 34, was named NFL Comeback Player of the Year. The Denver defense was known as the Orange Crush, which delighted the makers of the soft drink, based in Illinois. Denver's 1977 season is chronicled in Terry Frei's 2008 book, '77: Denver, the Broncos and a Coming of Age.

The last remaining active member of the 1977 Denver Broncos was offensive lineman Billy Bryan, who retired after the 1989 season.

== Offseason ==
=== NFL draft ===
1977 Denver Broncos draft
Round	Pick	Player	Position	College	Notes
1	18	Steve Schindler	G	Boston College	
2	45	Rob Lytle	RB	Michigan	
4	101	Billy Bryan	C	Duke	
7	185	Larry Swider	P	Pittsburgh	
8	212	Calvin Culliver	RB	Alabama	
9	241	Charles Jackson	DT	Washington	
10	268	Oren Middlebrook	WR	Arkansas State	
11	297	Phil Heck	LB	California	
12	324	Scott Levenhagen	TE	Western Illinois	
Made roster † Pro Football Hall of Fame * Made at least one Pro Bowl during career

== Personnel ==
=== Staff ===
1977 Denver Broncos staff
Front office: Chairman of the Board – Gerald Phipps; President – Allan Phipps; Vice President/General Manager – Fred Gehrke; Director of Player Personnel – Carroll Hardy; Director of Pro Scouting – Doc Urich; Head coaches: Head Coach – Red Miller; Offensive coaches: Quarterbacks – Babe Parilli; Offensive Backfield – Paul Roach; Wide Receivers – Fran Polsfoot; Offensive Line – Ken Gray	Defensive coaches: Defensive Coordinator – Joe Collier; Defensive Line – Stan Jones; Linebackers – Myrel Moore; Defensive Backs – Bob Gambold; Special teams coaches: Special Teams – Marv Braden

=== Roster ===
1977 Denver Broncos roster
Quarterbacks (QB): 7 Craig Morton; 12 Craig Penrose; 14 Norris Weese; Running backs (RB): 24 Otis Armstrong; 30 Jim Jensen; 32 Jon Keyworth; 41 Rob Lytle; 35 Lonnie Perrin; Wide receivers (WR): 82 Jack Dolbin; 25 Haven Moses; 86 John Schultz; 80 Rick Upchurch; Tight ends (TE): 85 Ron Egloff; 88 Riley Odoms	Offensive linemen (OL): 73 Hank Allison G/T; 62 Tom Glassic G; 65 Glenn Hyde T; 60 Paul Howard G; 50 Bobby Maples C; 74 Andy Maurer T; 71 Claudie Minor T; 52 Mike Montler C; 67 Steve Schindler T/G; Defensive linemen (DL): 77 Lyle Alzado DE; 68 Rubin Carter NT; 79 Barney Chavous DE; 63 John Grant NT; 66 Brison Manor DE; 70 Paul Smith DE	Linebackers (LB): 56 Larry Evans OLB; 53 Randy Gradishar ILB; 57 Tom Jackson OLB; 58 Rob Nairne OLB; 59 Joe Rizzo ILB; 51 Bob Swenson OLB; 55 Godwin Turk ILB; Defensive backs (DB): 43 Steve Foley CB; 29 Bernard Jackson FS; 21 Randy Poltl FS; 40 Randy Rich CB/S; 26 Larry Riley CB; 36 Bill Thompson SS; 20 Louis Wright CB; Special teams (ST): 10 Bucky Dilts P; 15 Jim Turner K	Reserve: 75 Bill Bain T (IR); 54 Rich Baska LB (IR); 64 Billy Bryan C (IR); -- Randy Cozens DE (IR); -- Charles Jackson LB (IR); 23 Chris Pane CB (IR); Rookies in italics

== Regular season ==
=== Schedule ===
Week	Date	Opponent	Result	Record	Venue	Attendance
1	September 18	St. Louis Cardinals	**W** 7–0	1–0	Mile High Stadium	75,002
2	September 25	Buffalo Bills	**W** 26–6	2–0	Mile High Stadium	74,897
3	October 2	at **Seattle Seahawks**	**W** 24–13	3–0	Kingdome	53,108
4	October 9	**Kansas City Chiefs**	**W** 23–7	4–0	Mile High Stadium	74,878
5	October 16	at **Oakland Raiders**	**W** 30–7	5–0	Oakland–Alameda County Coliseum	53,616
6	October 23	at Cincinnati Bengals	**W** 24–13	6–0	Riverfront Stadium	54,395
7	October 30	**Oakland Raiders**	**L** 14–24	6–1	Mile High Stadium	75,007
8	November 6	Pittsburgh Steelers	**W** 21–7	7–1	Mile High Stadium	74,967
9	November 13	at **San Diego Chargers**	**W** 17–14	8–1	San Diego Stadium	45,211
10	November 20	at **Kansas City Chiefs**	**W** 14–7	9–1	Arrowhead Stadium	54,050
11	November 27	Baltimore Colts	**W** 27–13	10–1	Mile High Stadium	74,939
12	December 4	at Houston Oilers	**W** 24–14	11–1	Astrodome	46,875
13	December 11	**San Diego Chargers**	**W** 17–9	12–1	Mile High Stadium	74,905
14	December 18	at Dallas Cowboys	**L** 6–14	12–2	Texas Stadium	63,752
Note: Intra-division opponents are in **bold** text.

=== Season summary ===
==== Week 1 ====
Team	1	2	3	4	Total
Cardinals	0	0	0	0	0
• Broncos	0	0	7	0	7

- Date: September 18
- Location:
  Mile High Stadium, Denver, Colorado
- Game start: 2:00 p.m.
- Game weather: 60 °F (16 °C), wind 10 mph (16 km/h)
- Referee: Dick Jorgensen
- TV announcers (CBS): Don Criqui and Emerson Boozer

Scoring summary
3	DEN	Otis Armstrong 10 yard run (Jim Turner kick)	Broncos 7–0

==== Week 2 ====
Team	1	2	3	4	Total
Bills	0	6	0	0	6
• Broncos	3	7	13	3	26

- Date: September 25
- Location:
  Mile High Stadium, Denver, Colorado
- Game start: 4:00 p.m. EST
- Game weather: 66 °F (19 °C); wind 11 mph (18 km/h)
- Referee: Fred Silva

Scoring summary
Q1	DEN	Turner 48 yard field goal	DEN 3–0
Q2	BUF	Cornell 22 yard fumble return (kick failed)	BUF 6–3
Q2	DEN	Morton 5 yard run (Turner kick)	DEN 10–6
Q3	DEN	Armstrong 1 yard run (kick failed)	DEN 16–6
Q3	DEN	Odoms 1 yard pass from Morton (Turner kick)	DEN 23–6
Q4	DEN	Turner 26 yard field goal	DEN 26–6

==== Week 3 ====
Team	1	2	3	4	Total
• Broncos	10	0	14	0	24
Seahawks	7	0	6	0	13

- Date: October 2
- Location: Kingdome
- Game weather: Indoors (dome)
- Referee: Jerry Markbreit

==== Week 4 ====
Team	1	2	3	4	Total
Chiefs	0	0	0	7	7
• Broncos	10	6	7	0	23

- Date: October 9
- Location: Mile High Stadium
- Referee: Gordon McCarter

==== Week 5 ====
Team	1	2	3	4	Total
• Broncos	7	14	6	3	30
Raiders	7	0	0	0	7

- Date: October 16
- Location: Oakland-Alameda County Coliseum

==== Week 6 ====
Team	1	2	3	4	Total
• Broncos	7	10	0	7	24
Bengals	7	3	0	3	13

- Date: October 23
- Location: Riverfront Stadium

==== Week 7 ====
Team	1	2	3	4	Total
• Raiders	7	10	7	0	24
Broncos	0	0	0	14	14

- Date: October 30
- Location: Mile High Stadium

==== Week 8 ====
Team	1	2	3	4	Total
Steelers	0	0	0	7	7
• Broncos	14	7	0	0	21

- Date: November 6
- Location: Mile High Stadium
- Referee: Fred Wyant

==== Week 9 ====
Team	1	2	3	4	Total
• Broncos	3	0	7	7	17
Chargers	7	7	0	0	14

- Date: November 13
- Location: San Diego Stadium

==== Week 10 ====
Team	1	2	3	4	Total
• Broncos	0	7	0	7	14
Chiefs	0	7	0	0	7

- Date: November 20
- Location: Arrowhead Stadium
- Referee: Dick Jorgensen

==== Week 11 ====
Team	1	2	3	4	Total
Colts	0	3	10	0	13
• Broncos	7	7	0	13	27

- Date: November 27
- Location: Mile High Stadium
- Referee: Jim Tunney

==== Week 12 ====
Team	1	2	3	4	Total
• Broncos	0	14	3	7	24
Oilers	0	7	7	0	14

- Date: December 4
- Location: Houston Astrodome
- Game start: 1:00 p.m. EST
- Game attendance: 46,875
- Game weather: Indoors (dome)
- Referee: Chuck Heberling

Scoring summary
Q2	HOU	Coleman 2 yard run (Fritsch kick)	HOU 7–0
Q2	DEN	Odoms 13 yard pass from Morton (Turner kick)	Tie 7–7
Q2	DEN	Upchurch 13 yard pass from Morton (Turner kick)	DEN 14–7
Q3	DEN	Turner 42 yard field goal	DEN 17–7
Q3	HOU	Burrough 29 yard pass from Pastorini (Fritsch kick)	DEN 17–14
Q4	DEN	Weese 5 yard run (Turner kick)	DEN 24–14

==== Week 13 ====
Team	1	2	3	4	Total
Chargers	3	3	3	0	9
• Broncos	7	0	0	10	17

- Date: December 11
- Location: Mile High Stadium
- Referee: Red Cashion

==== Week 14 ====
Team	1	2	3	4	Total
Broncos	0	0	3	3	6
• Cowboys	7	0	7	0	14

- Date: December 18
- Location: Texas Stadium
- Game start: 1:00 pm
- Game weather: 52 °F (11 °C); wind 10 mph (16 km/h)
- Referee: Jerry Markbreit
- TV announcers (NBC): Jack Buck and Len Dawson

Scoring summary
Q1	DAL	P. Pearson 22 yard pass from Staubach (Herrera kick)	DAL 7–0
Q3	DAL	Newhouse 7 yard pass from Staubach (Herrera kick)	DAL 14–0
Q3	DEN	Turner 22 yard field goal	DAL 14–3
Q4	DEN	Turner 37 yard field goal	DAL 14–6

=== Standings ===
AFC West
	W	L	T	PCT	DIV	CONF	PF	PA	STK
Denver Broncos^{(1)}	12	2	0	.857	6–1	11–1	274	148	L1
Oakland Raiders^{(4)}	11	3	0	.786	5–2	10–2	351	230	W2
San Diego Chargers	7	7	0	.500	3–4	6–6	222	205	L2
Seattle Seahawks	5	9	0	.357	1–3	4–9	282	373	W2
Kansas City Chiefs	2	12	0	.143	1–6	1–11	225	349	L6

== Playoffs ==
Week	Date	Opponent (seed)	Result	Record	Venue	Attendance
Divisional Playoffs	December 24	Pittsburgh Steelers (3)	W 34–21	1–0	Mile High Stadium	75,011
AFC Championship	January 1, 1978	Oakland Raiders (4)	W 20–17	2–0	Mile High Stadium	74,982
Super Bowl XII	January 15, 1978	Dallas Cowboys (N1)	L 10–27	2–1	Louisiana Superdome	76,400

=== Divisional ===
Team	1	2	3	4	Total
Steelers	0	14	0	7	21
• Broncos	7	7	7	13	34

- Date: December 24
- Location:
  Mile High Stadium • Denver, Colorado
- Referee: Gene Barth

In Denver's first postseason football contest, linebacker Tom Jackson's 2 interceptions and a fumble recovery set up 17 points, 10 of them in the 4th quarter, as the Broncos defeated the Steelers for the first playoff win in their 18-year history.

Denver scored first after Broncos receiver John Schultz blocked a punt from Rick Engles and recovered the ball on the Steelers 17-yard line to set up running back Rob Lytle's 7-yard rushing touchdown. Pittsburgh responded with a 56-yard drive, including a 19-yard reception by tight end Bennie Cunningham on 4th down and 1, to tie the score on quarterback Terry Bradshaw's 1-yard rushing touchdown.

In the second quarter, Broncos defensive tackle Lyle Alzado forced a fumble from Franco Harris, which linebacker Randy Gradishar recovered and returned 5 yards before fumbling himself. The second fumble was recovered by Tom Jackson, who returned it 25 yards to the Pittsburgh 10-yard line. On the next play, running back Otis Armstrong ran the ball into the end zone to give the Broncos a 14–7 lead. However, Pittsburgh quickly struck back starting with Jim Smith's 28-yard kickoff return to the Steelers 34-yard line. Bradshaw then hit John Stallworth for a 21-yard completion and Harris ripped off a 20-yard burst before he finished the drive with a 1-yard touchdown run to tie the game at 14 with 1:41 left in the half.

In the third quarter, the Broncos drove 52 yards to the Pittsburgh 1-yard line, only to lose the ball when Jim Jensen was stuffed for no gain by Jack Lambert and Jimmy Allen on 4th down. But after a punt, they drove 43 yards to go up 21–14 on Craig Morton's 30-yard touchdown pass to tight end Riley Odoms.

Early in the 4th quarter, Pittsburgh managed to tie the game with a 48-yard catch by Stallworth setting up Bradshaw's 1-yard touchdown pass to tight end Larry Brown. But this would be their last score as Denver soon took over the game. First, Jim Turner put the Broncos up 24–21 by kicking 44-yard field goal with 7:17 left on the clock. Then Jackson intercepted a pass from Bradshaw and returned it 32 yards to the Steelers 9-yard line, setting up Turner's 24-yard field goal to make the score 27–21. On Pittsburgh's ensuring drive, Jackson struck again, intercepting another pass and returning this one 17 yards to the Steelers 33. Rather than sitting on their one-score lead and trying to run out the clock with running plays, Denver took to the air, scoring the game clinching touchdown on Morton's 34-yard pass to Jack Dolbin with 1:44 left in the game.

Harris finished the game with 92 rushing yards, 4 receptions for 20 yards, and a touchdown. Morton only completed 11 of 23 passes, but he threw for 167 yards and two touchdowns with no interceptions.

This was the first postseason meeting between the Steelers and Broncos.

Broncos win and go to the AFC Championship Game and win to the Oakland Raiders 20-17. But in Super Bowl XII lost to the Dallas Cowboys 27-10.

=== Conference Championship ===
Team	1	2	3	4	Total
Raiders	3	0	0	14	17
• Broncos	7	0	7	6	20

- Date: January 1
- Location:
  Mile High Stadium • Denver, Colorado
- Game start: 12:00 p.m. MST
- Game attendance: 74,982
- Game weather: 13 °F (−11 °C) • Wind 6 mph (10 km/h)
- Referee: Chuck Heberling
- TV announcers (NBC): Dick Enberg and Len Dawson

Scoring summary
1	OAK	Errol Mann 20 yard field goal	Raiders 3–0
1	DEN	Haven Moses 74 yard pass from Craig Morton (Jim Turner kick)	Broncos 7–3
3	DEN	Jon Keyworth 1 yard run (Jim Turner kick)	Broncos 14–3
4	OAK	Dave Casper 7 yard pass from Ken Stabler (Errol Mann kick)	Broncos 14–10
4	DEN	Haven Moses 12 yard pass from Craig Morton (kick failed)	Broncos 20–10
4	OAK	Dave Casper 17 yard pass from Ken Stabler (Errol Mann kick)	Broncos 20–17

Despite a poor day from veteran kicker Jim Turner, who missed three field goals and had an extra point blocked, Denver converted two second half turnovers into touchdowns to edge out the defending Super Bowl champion Raiders.

Denver was forced to punt on their opening drive, and Bucky Dilts's kick went just 21 yards to the Oakland 43-yard line. Aided by two Broncos penalties, including a running into the punter call that enabled Oakland to avoid a three and out, the Raiders subsequently drove to the Denver 2-yard line and scored with Errol Mann's 20-yard field goal. But on the Broncos' second drive, quarterback Craig Morton threw a 74-yard touchdown to wide receiver Haven Moses, who caught the ball along the right sideline and managed to break through a tackle attempt by defensive back Skip Thomas and stay in bounds on the way to the end zone. The score would remain 7–3 for the rest of the half, with Mann hitting the uprights on a 30-yard field goal try and Turner missing a 40-yard attempt. The Raiders also suffered a major setback when receiver Fred Biletnikoff went down with a separated shoulder.

Oakland's Carl Garrett returned the second half kickoff 62 yards to the Broncos 33-yard line. On first down, Ken Stabler tried to connect with Cliff Branch in the end zone, but defensive Steve Foley barely managed to deflect the pass away. Then running back Mark van Eeghen was held to a 1-yard gain, Stabler threw a third down incompletion, and the Raiders decided to punt rather than risk a 49-yard field goal. Denver took after and drove deep into Raiders territory, with Moses hauling in a 41-yard reception to give the Broncos another scoring chance, but following a bad snap, Turner missed another field goal, this one from 31 yards. On the next play, Oakland's Clarence Davis lost a fumble that defensive end Brison Manor recovered at the Oakland 17-yard line. A short carry from fullback Jon Keyworth and Morton's 13-yard completion then moved the ball to the 2. Then running back Rob Lytle was hit in mid-air while trying to dive over the line by Raiders safety Jack Tatum, and lost the ball. Oakland nose tackle Mike McCoy appeared to recover the fumble, but the play was blown dead by an official on the opposite side of the field. The officials (chiefly Ed Marion) ruled that Lytle's forward progress was stopped before the fumble, even though replays clearly showed the ball was knocked free at the moment of contact. Denver retained possession. The Raiders were then penalized half the distance to the goal for arguing the call, and Keyworth scored a Denver touchdown on the next play to give Denver a 14–3 lead.

Later on, Denver recovered a muffed punt from Garrett on the Raiders 27-yard line. Right after the turnover, Morton appeared to throw a touchdown pass to Jack Dolbin, who made a rolling catch along the ground and then got up and headed for the end zone. However, officials ruled the ball had touched the ground before he secured the catch (replays appeared to contradict this) and it was called as an incompletion. Following two more incomplete passes, Turner missed his third field goal of the day, this time from 44 yards, and the Broncos came up empty.

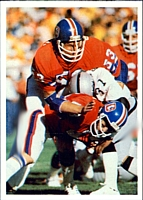
The Broncos, led by their famed Orange Crush Defense (pictured), defeated the Raiders in the AFC Championship Game to earn their first trip to the Super Bowl.

Near the end of the third quarter, Oakland finally caught a break when Garrett returned Dilts' 38-yard punt 4 yards to the Broncos 48-yard line. On the next play, Van Eeghen rushed for 13 yards. Following an incompletion, Stabler fired a pass to tight end Dave Casper, who made a falling catch, got back up, and took off for a 26-yard gain to the Denver 9. Two plays later, Stabler finished the drive with a 7-yard touchdown pass to Casper on the second play of the fourth quarter, cutting the score to 14–10. Denver responded by advancing the ball to the Raiders 11-yard line, only to have linebacker Floyd Rice intercept the ball from Morton and take it 11 yards back to the 22. Oakland now seemed primed to drive for a leading touchdown, but before they could get out of their own territory, Denver linebacker Bob Swenson made a clutch interception and returned the ball 14 yards to the Oakland 17-yard line. Two plays later, Moses made a sliding 12-yard catch of Morton's pass in the end zone, putting the Broncos ahead 20–10 after Turner's extra point was blocked. Oakland struck back with an 8-play, 74-yard drive to score on Casper's 17-yard touchdown catch to make it 20–17 with 3:16 left in regulation, but the Broncos' held the ball for the rest of the game and ran out the clock.

Moses was responsible for most of Denver's 217 yards gained through the air, finishing the game with 5 receptions for 168 yards and two touchdowns. Morton completed 10/20 passes for 224 yards and two touchdowns, with one interception. Stabler finished 17/35 for 215 yards and two touchdowns with one pick. Garrett returned 3 kickoffs for 111 yards and two punts for 5.

With his two touchdown catches along with his three against the Colts, Casper set a single post-season record for touchdowns by a tight end (5) which still stands to this day.

This was the first postseason meeting between the Raiders and Broncos. It was also Denver's first home victory over Oakland, either in regular season or post season, since 1962 (the two teams played to ties in 1964 and 1973).

Source: Broncos go to Super Bowl XII but lost to the Dallas Cowboys 27-10.

=== Super Bowl ===
Team	1	2	3	4	Total
• Cowboys	10	3	7	7	27
Broncos	0	0	10	0	10

- Date: January 15
- Location: Louisiana Superdome
- Game attendance: 76,400
- Game weather: Indoors (dome)
- Referee: Jim Tunney
- TV announcers (CBS): Pat Summerall and Tom Brookshier

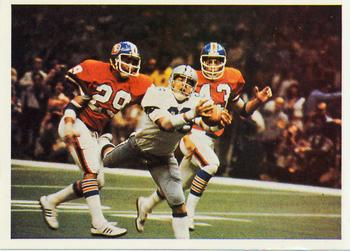
The Broncos playing against the Cowboys in Super Bowl XII.

Super Bowl XII did not start out well for the Cowboys, as they nearly turned over the ball three times on their first two possessions. On Dallas' first play from scrimmage, receiver Butch Johnson fumbled the handoff on a double reverse, but recovered the ball. Dallas was then forced to punt, and the Broncos advanced to the Cowboys' 33-yard line before quarterback Craig Morton was sacked for an 11-yard loss on third down. On the ensuing punt, Cowboys punt returner Tony Hill fumbled the ball at the 1-yard line, but managed to fall on the ball before any Denver players recovered it. A few plays later, Dallas running back Tony Dorsett fumbled on his own 19-yard line, but center John Fitzgerald quickly recovered the ball.

On the Broncos' second drive of the game, Cowboys linemen Randy White and Harvey Martin forced Morton to hurry his throw, and defensive back Randy Hughes intercepted the rushed pass at the Broncos 25-yard line. 5 plays after the turnover, Dorsett scored on a 3-yard touchdown run. On the Broncos' next possession, Morton was intercepted again when his pass was tipped by linebacker Bob Breunig into the arms of defensive back Aaron Kyle, who then returned the ball 19 yards to Denver's 35-yard line. Dallas then drove to the 8-yard line, but Cowboys quarterback Roger Staubach was sacked by Lyle Alzado for a 10-yard loss on third down, forcing them to settle for a 35-yard Efren Herrera field goal to increase their lead to 10-0.

In the second quarter, Dallas advanced to Denver's 19-yard line, and once again barely avoided a turnover. On third down, Staubach's pass was intercepted in the end zone, but officials ruled that he had stepped out of bounds before he threw the ball. On the next play, Herrera added a 43-yard field goal to increase the Dallas lead to 13-0.

The rest of the quarter was filled with sloppy play and turnovers by both teams. On the second play after receiving the ensuing kickoff, Morton was intercepted again, this time by Dallas defensive back Benny Barnes at his own 40-yard line. The Cowboys then drove to the Denver 26-yard line, but Herrera missed wide left from 43 yards out. The Broncos then committed another turnover when wide receiver Jack Dolbinfumbled, and Hughes picked it up and returned it 19 yards to the Denver 27-yard line. However, the Cowboys once again failed to score as Herrera missed a 32-yard field goal attempt. On the first play after the missed field goal, Hughes recovered Denver tight end Riley Odoms's fumble at the Broncos 28-yard line. But on the next play, Dallas gave the ball right back to Denver after Broncos linebacker Tom Jacksonrecovered tight end Billy Joe Dupree's fumble. 5 plays later, defensive back Mark Washington intercepted another errant Morton pass and returned it 27 yards to Denver's 35-yard line with just 6 seconds left in the period, but Herrera missed yet another field goal attempt, this time from 44 yards out as time expired in the first half.

By halftime, the Broncos had committed 7 turnovers. Morton, who had thrown a total of only 8 interceptions throughout the entire 1977 season, had been picked off 4 times, in addition to 3 fumbles lost. Yet Denver trailed by only 13 points as the second half began, and on the opening drive of the second half, the Broncos moved the ball deep into Dallas territory. First, John Schultz returned the second half kickoff 25 yards to the 35-yard line, and then Otis Armstrong ripped off an 18-yard gain. Seven plays later, Jim Turner finished the drive with a 47-yard field goal, cutting the score to 13-3. But later in the period, the Cowboys scored another touchdown on a 45-yard pass from Staubach to receiver Butch Johnson, who made a fingertip catch as he fell into the end zone. The receiver dropped the ball when he hit the ground, but the officials ruled he had caught the ball for a touchdown before it came out of his hands, and the Cowboys increased their lead to 20-3.

Denver kick returner Rick Upchurch returned the ensuing kickoff a super bowl record 67 yards to the Cowboys 26-yard line. On the next play, Morton nearly threw his fifth interception, and was then immediately replaced by former Ole Miss quarterback Norris Weese, a native of New Orleans suburb Chalmette. Two plays later on fourth down, Jim Jenson's 16-yard run moved the ball to the 1-yard line, and then Rob Lytle scored on a 1-yard touchdown run to cut the deficit to 20-10.

Midway through the fourth quarter, Weese fumbled the ball while being sacked by Martin, and Kyle recovered it on the Denver 29 yard line. On the next play, the Cowboys scored on a 29-yard halfback option play: Staubach pitched the ball to fullback Robert Newhouse, who ran left as if it were a normal run play, but then Newhouse passed the ball to Cowboys receiver Golden Richards for a touchdown. The score gave the Cowboys a 27-10 lead and put the game out of reach. Newhouse became the first running back in Super Bowl history to complete a touchdown pass.

Staubach finished the game with 17 out of 25 pass completions for 183 yards and a touchdown, with no interceptions. Dorsett was the leading rusher of the game, with 66 rushing yards and a touchdown. He also caught 2 passes for 11 receiving yards. In addition to his 29 yard touchdown pass, Newhouse also contributed with 55 rushing yards. Dallas tight end Billy Joe Dupree was the leading receiver of the game with 4 receptions for 66 yards. Hughes had an interception and a Super Bowl record 2 fumble recoveries.

Before being taken out of the game, Denver's starting quarterback Craig Morton completed just 4 out of 15 passes for 39 yards and was intercepted 4 times. Upchurch recorded 125 total offensive yards (94 on kickoff returns, 22 on punt returns, and 9 receiving yards).

The Cowboy's superb defense played a critical role in the game. White and Martin were named co-Most Valuable Players; this award is usually bestowed on an offensive player. The voters actually wanted to name the entire 11-man starting defensive lineup as co-MVPs, and asked the NFL if this was acceptable. The league said no, and so two players were picked for the award. The unheralded Hughes and Kyle of the Cowboy secondary each had superb games to play an important role in the victory. The two men came up with five turnovers between them, leading directly to 17 of Dallas' points.

Source: Broncos lost and in 1978 finished 10-6. But lost to the eventual Super Bowl XIII champion Steelers 33-10.
