= 1976 Denver Broncos season =

American football team season

- Owner: Gerald Phipps
- General manager: John Ralston
- Head coach: John Ralston
- Home stadium: Mile High Stadium

Results
- Record: 9–5
- Division place: 2nd AFC West
- Playoffs: Did not qualify

The 1976 Denver Broncos season was the team's 17th year in professional football and its seventh with the National Football League (NFL). The team finished the season with a winning record for the third time in the last four seasons. It was John Ralston's fifth and final season as the Broncos' head coach and general manager.

Denver was looking to improve on its 6–8 record from 1975 and finished 9–5, second in the AFC West; despite the winning record, the team again missed the playoffs, which included only eight teams. Oakland won the division at 13–1 and New England was the sole wild card team in the AFC at 11–3. Since their inception as an original AFL team in 1960, the Broncos had yet to play in the postseason.

Ralston was relieved of his duties as general manager in mid-December, succeeded by assistant GM Fred Gehrke. After several weeks in the restructured organization, Ralston resigned as head coach in late January 1977. Red Miller, the offensive line coach at New England under Chuck Fairbanks, was hired as head coach in early February. Miller had a previous stint with the Broncos as offensive line coach for three seasons (1963–65).

== Offseason ==
=== NFL draft ===
1976 Denver Broncos draft
Round	Pick	Player	Position	College	Notes
1	15	Tom Glassic	G	Virginia	
2	43	Kurt Knoff	S	Kansas	
4	107	Craig Penrose	QB	San Diego State	
5	139	Lonnie Perrin	RB	Illinois	
8	224	James Betterson	RB	North Carolina	
9	252	Jim Czirr	C	Michigan	
9	260	Jim Lisko	LB	Arkansas State	
10	278	Art Gilliam	DE	Grambling State	
11	306	Greg Pittman	LB	Iowa State	
12	334	Randy Moore	DT	Arizona State	
13	362	Donnie McGraw	DB	Houston	
14	390	Larry Evans	LB	Mississippi College	
15	418	Wilbur Summers	P	Louisville	
16	446	John Huddleston	LB	Utah	
17	474	Randy Cozens	DE	Pittsburgh	
Made roster † Pro Football Hall of Fame * Made at least one Pro Bowl during career

=== Undrafted free agents ===
1976 undrafted free agents of note
Player	Position	College
Mike Dunafon	Wide receiver	Northern Colorado
Steve Galloway	Wide Receiver	Virginia Tech
Harvey Goodman	Guard	Colorado
Steve Manni	Guard	Boston College
Mark Seymour	Tight end	Wyoming

== Personnel ==
=== Staff ===
1976 Denver Broncos staff
Front office: Chairman of the Board – Gerald Phipps; President – Allan Phipps; Assistant General Manager/Director of Player Personnel – Fred Gehrke; Director of Scouting – Carroll Hardy; Head coaches: Vice President/General Manager/Head Coach – John Ralston; Offensive coaches: Offensive Coordinator/Offensive Backfield – Max Coley; Quarterbacks – Charley Johnson; Wide Receivers – Kay Dalton; Offensive Line – Doc Urich; Assistant Offensive Line/Director of Pro Scouting – Mike Giddings	Defensive coaches: Defensive Coordinator – Joe Collier; Defensive Line – Stan Jones; Linebackers – Myrel Moore; Defensive Backs – Bob Gambold

=== Roster ===
1976 Denver Broncos roster
Quarterbacks (QB): 12 Craig Penrose; 10 Steve Ramsey; 14 Norris Weese P; Running backs (RB): 24 Otis Armstrong; 31 Mike Franckowiak; 32 Jon Keyworth; 33 Jim Kiick; 35 Lonnie Perrin; Wide receivers (WR): 82 Jack Dolbin; 25 Haven Moses; 86 John Schultz; 80 Rick Upchurch; Tight ends (TE): 87 Boyd Brown; 88 Riley Odoms	Offensive linemen (OL): 75 Bill Bain T; 62 Tom Glassic G; 64 Harvey Goodman G; 65 Glenn Hyde G/T; 61 Tommy Lyons G; 50 Bobby Maples C; 71 Claudie Minor T; 58 Phil Olsen C; 74 Scott Parrish T; Defensive linemen (DL): 68 Rubin Carter DT; 79 Barney Chavous DE; 63 John Grant DT; 72 Wayne Hammond DT; 73 Marty Imhof DE; 78 Jim White DE	Linebackers (LB): 54 Rich Baska OLB; 56 Larry Evans OLB; 53 Randy Gradishar MLB; 57 Tom Jackson OLB; 51 Bob Swenson OLB; 55 Godwin Turk OLB; Defensive backs (DB): 43 Steve Foley CB; 23 Billy Hardee CB; 26 Calvin Jones CB; 21 Randy Poltl FS; 46 John Rowser FS; 36 Bill Thompson SS; 20 Louis Wright CB; Special teams (ST): 15 Jim Turner K	Reserve: 77 Lyle Alzado DE (IR); -- Randy Cozens DE (IR); 60 Paul Howard G (IR); -- John Huddleston LB (IR); -- Kurt Knoff SS (IR); 66 Brison Manor DE (IR); 76 Randy Moore DT (IR); 23 Chris Pane S (IR); 59 Joe Rizzo LB (IR); 67 Carl Schaukowitch G (PUP); 70 Paul Smith DE (IR); 42 Billy Van Heusen P (IR); Rookies in italics 44 active, 12 reserve, 0 practice squad

== Schedule ==
Week	Date	Opponent	Result	Record	Venue	Attendance
1	September 12	at Cincinnati Bengals	**L** 7–17	0–1	Riverfront Stadium	53,464
2	September 19	New York Jets	**W** 46–3	1–1	Mile High Stadium	62,669
3	September 26	Cleveland Browns	**W** 44–13	2–1	Mile High Stadium	62,975
4	October 3	**San Diego Chargers**	**W** 26–0	3–1	Mile High Stadium	63,369
5	October 10	at Houston Oilers	**L** 3–17	3–2	Astrodome	45,298
6	October 17	**Oakland Raiders**	**L** 10–17	3–3	Mile High Stadium	63,431
7	October 24	at **Kansas City Chiefs**	**W** 35–26	4–3	Arrowhead Stadium	57,961
8	October 31	at **Oakland Raiders**	**L** 6–19	4–4	Oakland–Alameda County Coliseum	52,169
9	November 7	**Tampa Bay Buccaneers**	**W** 48–13	5–4	Mile High Stadium	62,703
10	November 14	at **San Diego Chargers**	**W** 17–0	6–4	San Diego Stadium	32,017
11	November 21	New York Giants	**W** 14–13	7–4	Mile High Stadium	63,151
12	November 28	at New England Patriots	**L** 14–38	7–5	Schaefer Stadium	61,128
13	December 5	**Kansas City Chiefs**	**W** 17–16	8–5	Mile High Stadium	58,170
14	December 12	at Chicago Bears	**W** 28–14	9–5	Soldier Field	44,459
Note: Intra-division opponents are in **bold** text.

== Standings ==
AFC West
	W	L	T	PCT	DIV	CONF	PF	PA	STK
Oakland Raiders^{(1)}	13	1	0	.929	7–0	10–1	350	237	W10
Denver Broncos	9	5	0	.643	5–2	7–5	315	206	W2
San Diego Chargers	6	8	0	.429	2–5	4–8	248	285	L1
Kansas City Chiefs	5	9	0	.357	2–5	4–8	290	376	W1
Tampa Bay Buccaneers	0	14	0	.000	0–4	0–13	125	412	L14
