= 1977–78 NFL playoffs =

American football tournament

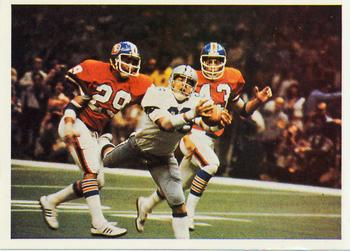
- The Dallas Cowboys playing against the Denver Broncos in Super Bowl XII
- Dates: December 24, 1977–January 15, 1978
- Season: 1977
- Teams: 8
- Games played: 7
- Super Bowl XII site: Louisiana Superdome; New Orleans, Louisiana
- Defending champions: Oakland Raiders
- Champion: Dallas Cowboys (2nd title)
- Runner-up: Denver Broncos
- Conference runners-up: Minnesota Vikings; Oakland Raiders
NFL playoffs
← 1976–77	1978–79 →

The National Football League playoffs for the 1977 season began on December 24, 1977. The postseason tournament concluded with the Dallas Cowboys defeating the Denver Broncos in Super Bowl XII, 27–10, on January 15, 1978, at the Louisiana Superdome in New Orleans, Louisiana.

This was also the last season that the NFL used an eight-team playoff tournament.

== Participants ==
Within each conference, the three division winners and the non-division winner with the best record qualified for the playoffs. The three division winners were seeded 1–3 based on their overall won-lost-tied record, and the wild card team was seeded 4. The first round, dubbed the divisional playoffs, had a restriction where two teams from the same division could not meet: the surviving wild card team visited the highest-seeded division champion that was outside its own division, and the remaining two teams from that conference played each other. The two surviving teams from each conference's divisional playoff games met in the respective AFC and NFC Conference Championship games, hosted by the higher seed. Although the Super Bowl, the championship round of the playoffs, was played at a neutral site, the designated home team was based on an annual rotation by conference.

Playoff seeds
Seed	AFC	NFC
1	Denver Broncos (West winner)	Dallas Cowboys (East winner)
2	Baltimore Colts (East winner)	Los Angeles Rams (West winner)
3	Pittsburgh Steelers (Central winner)	Minnesota Vikings (Central winner)
4	Oakland Raiders (wild card)	Chicago Bears (wild card)

== Bracket ==
Dec 26 – Los Angeles Memorial Coliseum
3	Minnesota	14
Jan 1 – Texas Stadium
2	Los Angeles	7
NFC
3	Minnesota	6
Dec 26 – Texas Stadium
1	Dallas	23
NFC Championship
4	Chicago	7
Jan 15 – Louisiana Superdome
1	Dallas	37
Divisional round
N1	Dallas	27
Dec 24 – Memorial Stadium
A1	Denver	10
Super Bowl XII
4	Oakland	37**
Jan 1 – Mile High Stadium
2*	Baltimore	31
AFC
4	Oakland	17
Dec 24 – Mile High Stadium
1	Denver	20
AFC Championship
3	Pittsburgh	21
1*	Denver	34

* The Denver Broncos (the AFC 1 seed) did not play the Oakland Raiders (the 4 seed) in the Divisional playoff round because both teams were in the same division.
** Indicates double overtime victory

== Schedule ==
Due to Christmas falling on a Sunday, the Divisional Round games were held in a span of three days. The AFC playoff games were played on Saturday, December 24, while the NFC games were held on Monday, December 26. It also marked the only year since the AFL–NFL merger in 1970 that one conference held both of its divisional playoff games on one day and the other conference held both of its games on the other day. This was done to ensure the teams in each conference championship game had the same amount of rest (eight days for the AFC and six days for the NFC). In every other season since 1970, the conferences have split their playoff games over the two days.

The previous year, with Christmas on Saturday, the schedule was advanced a week and the conference championships were the next day, Sunday, December 26. Christmas was also on Saturday in 1971, during the divisional round; two games were played, one in each conference. The late game on Christmas 1971 between Miami and Kansas City was the longest NFL game by playing time at 82 minutes, 40 seconds (a mark which stands heading into the 2025 season); complaints about that length prompted the NFL to avoid playing on Christmas again until 1989.

In the United States, NBC broadcast the AFC playoff games, while CBS televised the NFC games and Super Bowl XII.

Round	Away team	Score	Home team	Date	Kickoff (ET / UTC−5)	TV
Divisional round	Oakland Raiders	37–31 (2OT)	Baltimore Colts	December 24, 1977	12:30 p.m.	NBC
Divisional round	Pittsburgh Steelers	21–34	Denver Broncos	December 24, 1977	4:00 p.m.	NBC
Divisional round	Chicago Bears	7–37	Dallas Cowboys	December 26, 1977	2:00 p.m.	CBS
Divisional round	Minnesota Vikings	14–7	Los Angeles Rams	December 26, 1977	6:00 p.m.	CBS
Conference championships	Oakland Raiders	17–20	Denver Broncos	January 1, 1978	2:00 p.m.	NBC
Conference championships	Minnesota Vikings	6–23	Dallas Cowboys	January 1, 1978	5:00 p.m.	CBS
Super Bowl XII Louisiana Superdome New Orleans, Louisiana	Dallas Cowboys	27–10	Denver Broncos	January 15, 1978	6:00 p.m.	CBS

== Divisional round ==
=== Saturday, December 24, 1977 ===
==== AFC: Oakland Raiders 37, Baltimore Colts 31 (2OT) ====
Oakland Raiders vs. Baltimore Colts – Game summary

Quarter	1	2	3	4	OT	2OT	Total
Raiders	7	0	14	10	0	6	37
Colts	0	10	7	14	0	0	31

at Memorial Stadium, Baltimore, Maryland

- Game time: 12:30 p.m. EST
- Game weather: 51 °F (11 °C), mostly cloudy
- Game attendance: 59,925
- Referee: Dick Jorgensen
- TV announcers (NBC): Curt Gowdy and John Brodie

Game information

First quarter

- OAK – Clarence Davis 30-yard run (Errol Mann kick). Raiders 7–0.

Second quarter

- BAL – Bruce Laird 61-yard interception return (Toni Linhart kick). Tied 7–7.
- BAL – Toni Linhart 36-yard field goal. Colts 10–7.

Third quarter

- OAK – Dave Casper 8-yard pass from Ken Stabler (Errol Mann kick). Raiders 14–10.
- BAL – Marshall Johnson 87-yard kickoff return (Toni Linhart kick). Colts 17–14.
- OAK – Dave Casper 10-yard pass from Ken Stabler (Errol Mann kick). Raiders 21–17.

Fourth quarter

- BAL – Ron Lee 1-yard run (Toni Linhart kick). Colts 24–21.
- OAK – Pete Banaszak 1-yard run (Errol Mann run). Raiders 28–24.
- BAL – Ron Lee 13-yard run (Toni Linhart kick). Colts 31–28.
- OAK – Errol Mann 22-yard field goal. Tied 31–31.

First Overtime

- No scoring plays.

Second Overtime

- OAK – Dave Casper 10-yard pass from Ken Stabler. Raiders 37–31.

Top passers

- OAK – Ken Stabler – 21/40, 345 yards, 3 TD, 2 INT
- BAL – Bert Jones – 12/26, 164 yards

Top rushers

- OAK – Mark van Eeghen – 19 rushes, 76 yards
- BAL – Lydell Mitchell – 23 rushes, 67 yards

Top receivers

- OAK – Cliff Branch – 6 receptions, 113 yards
- BAL – Freddie Scott – 2 receptions, 45 yards

On a play that became known as Ghost to the Post, Raiders quarterback Ken Stabler threw a 42-yard completion to tight end Dave Casper on a post route to set up the game-tying field goal with 29 seconds left in regulation. Casper, nicknamed "The Ghost" by his teammates, also caught a 10-yard touchdown pass 43 seconds into the second overtime period to win the game. The game featured nine lead changes before it was over.

Oakland's Carl Garrett started the game with a 40-yard kick return to the Colts 41-yard line. But they could not take advantage and lost the ball when Mark Van Eeghen's fumble was recovered by Lyle Blackwood. The rest of the quarter was a defensive struggle, but with less than a minute left, Oakland scored first with running back Clarence Davis's 30-yard touchdown run. Oakland then forced a three and out deep in Baltimore territory and got the ball back with great field position at the Colts 48. They seemed to be in prime position to increase their lead, but Baltimore's Bruce Laird intercepted Stabler's pass and returned it 61-yards for a touchdown. Later in the quarter, Baltimore mounted their first sustained drive, moving the ball from their 20 to the Raiders 19-yard line. Following a dropped interception by Jack Tatum, Toni Linhart's 36-yard field goal gave them their first lead of the game. Oakland responded with a drive to the Colts 23-yard line, but with less than a minute left, John Dutton recovered a fumble from Davis to preserve the 10–7 score going into halftime.

The Raiders scored on their first drive of the second half with Stabler's 41-yard completion to Cliff Branch setting up his 8-yard touchdown pass to Casper. To make matters worse for the Colts, Blackwood was injured on the drive and had to miss the rest of the game. But Baltimore still took the lead right back as Marshall Johnson returned the ensuing kickoff 87 yards to the end zone. On Oakland's next possession, they lost their fourth turnover of the day when Laird picked off another Stabler pass, this one on the Raiders 40. But the Raiders defense rose to the occasion, forcing a punt that was blocked by Ted Hendricks and recovered by linebacker Jeff Barnes, who returned it to the Colts 16-yard line. Two plays later, Casper caught a 10-yard touchdown pass to make the score 21–17.

Baltimore scored on their first drive of the fourth quarter, driving 80 yards to a fourth down 1-yard touchdown run by Ron Lee. Oakland quickly struck back, starting with Garrett's 43-yard kickoff return to his own 47. After two incompletions, Stabler kept the drive going with a 25-yard pass to Van Eeghen. Then Nelson Munsey was hit with a 24-yard pass interference penalty while trying to cover Branch in the end zone, and Pete Banaszak rushed for a touchdown on the next play. Baltimore stormed right back with a touchdown on their own on a 73-yard drive, starting off with Bert Jones' 30-yard completion to Raymond Chester and followed up with a 16-yard swing pass to Lee. Lee then moved the ball to the 14-yard line with a 13-yard run, and scored from there on the next play, giving the Colts a 31–28 lead. Baltimore's defense quickly forced a punt, giving the offense the ball in good field position with a chance to put the game away. But the Raiders stopped them on three consecutive runs, all on tackles from defensive end John Matuszak.

After both teams punted once more, Oakland got the ball back with 2:55 left in regulation on their own 30. After a 14-yard reception by Davis and an incompletion, Stabler's 42-yard "Ghost to the Post" completion to Casper advanced the Raiders to the Baltimore 14-yard line. A few plays later, they faced fourth down and 1 from the 5. Rather than risk the game on a fourth-down conversion attempt, Oakland decided to kick the field goal, and Errol Mann sent it through the uprights from 22 yards, tying the game and sending it into overtime.

After forcing Baltimore to punt on the opening drive of overtime, Oakland drove 41 yards in nine plays to set up a field goal attempt for Mann, but the kick was blocked by Mike Barnes. After another punt, Oakland drove to the Colts 35-yard line. On second down, Stabler was sacked for a 10-yard loss by Fred Cook, pushing his team out of field goal range. But then he kept the drive alive with a 19-yard completion to Branch, setting up Casper's 10-yard touchdown catch less than a minute into the second overtime period to win the game.

Stabler threw for 345 yards and three touchdowns, with two interceptions. Casper finished with 4 receptions for 70 yards and three touchdowns. Oakland linebacker Monte Johnson had 20 tackles and finished the game with a broken vertebra in his neck. Garrett returned 5 kickoffs for 169 yards. Marshall Johnson finished with 3 kickoff returns for 134 yards and a touchdown, along with a punt return for 16. Baltimore's top offensive performer was Lydell Mitchell, who rushed for 67 yards and caught 3 passes for 39.

This was the final NFL playoff game in Baltimore's Memorial Stadium. The Colts did not return to the playoffs until 1987, their fourth season in Indianapolis, and the Ravens failed to qualify for the playoffs during either of their two seasons at Memorial Stadium, 1996 and 1997. Playoff football would not return to Baltimore until New Year's Eve 2000, at PSINet Stadium.

This was second postseason meeting between the Raiders and Colts. Baltimore won the only prior meeting.

Previous playoff games
Baltimore leads 1–0 in all-time playoff games

1970

Oakland Raiders 17 @ Baltimore Colts 27

1970 AFC Championship Game

==== AFC: Denver Broncos 34, Pittsburgh Steelers 21 ====
Pittsburgh Steelers vs. Denver Broncos – Game summary

Quarter	1	2	3	4	Total
Steelers	0	14	0	7	21
Broncos	7	7	7	13	34

at Mile High Stadium, Denver, Colorado

- Game time: 4:00 p.m. EST
- Game weather: 45 °F (7 °C) (approx.), sunny
- Game attendance: 75,079
- Referee: Gene Barth
- TV announcers (NBC): Jim Simpson and Merlin Olsen

Game information

First quarter

- DEN – Rob Lytle 7-yard run (Jim Turner kick). Broncos 7–0.

Second quarter

- PIT – Terry Bradshaw 1-yard run (Roy Gerela kick). Tied 7–7.
- DEN – Otis Armstrong 10-yard run (Jim Turner kick). Broncos 14–7.
- PIT – Franco Harris 1-yard run (Roy Gerela kick). Tied 14–14.

Third quarter

- DEN – Riley Odoms 30-yard pass from Craig Morton (Jim Turner kick). Broncos 21–14.

Fourth quarter

- PIT – Larry Brown 1-yard pass from Terry Bradshaw (Roy Gerela kick). Tied 21–21.
- DEN – Jim Turner 44-yard field goal. Broncos 24–21.
- DEN – Jim Turner 25-yard field goal. Broncos 27–21.
- DEN – Jack Dolbin 34-yard pass from Craig Morton (Jim Turner kick). Broncos 34–21.

Top passers

- PIT – Terry Bradshaw – 19/37, 177 yards, TD, 3 INT
- DEN – Craig Morton – 11/23, 164 yards, 2 TD

Top rushers

- PIT – Franco Harris – 28 rushes, 92 yards, TD
- DEN – Otis Armstrong – 11 rushes, 44 yards, TD

Top receivers

- PIT – John Stallworth – 4 receptions, 80 yards
- DEN – Haven Moses – 2 receptions, 45 yards

In Denver's first postseason football contest, linebacker Tom Jackson's 2 interceptions and a fumble recovery set up 17 points, 10 of them in the 4th quarter, as the Broncos defeated the Steelers for the first playoff win in their 18-year history.

Denver scored first after Broncos receiver John Schultz blocked a punt from Rick Engles and recovered the ball on the Steelers 17-yard line to set up running back Rob Lytle's 7-yard rushing touchdown. Pittsburgh responded with a 56-yard drive, including a 19-yard reception by tight end Bennie Cunningham on 4th down and 1, to tie the score on quarterback Terry Bradshaw's 1-yard rushing touchdown.

In the second quarter, Broncos defensive tackle Lyle Alzado forced a fumble from Franco Harris, which linebacker Randy Gradishar recovered and returned 5 yards before fumbling himself. The second fumble was recovered by Tom Jackson, who returned it 25 yards to the Pittsburgh 10-yard line. On the next play, running back Otis Armstrong ran the ball into the end zone to give the Broncos a 14–7 lead. However, Pittsburgh quickly struck back starting with Jim Smith's 28-yard kickoff return to the Steelers 34-yard line. Bradshaw then hit John Stallworth for a 21-yard completion and Harris ripped off a 20-yard burst before he finished the drive with a 1-yard touchdown run to tie the game at 14 with 1:41 left in the half.

In the third quarter, the Broncos drove 52 yards to the Pittsburgh 1-yard line, only to lose the ball when Jim Jensen was stuffed for no gain by Jack Lambert and Jim Allen on 4th down. But after a punt, they drove 43 yards to go up 21–14 on Craig Morton's 30-yard touchdown pass to tight end Riley Odoms.

Early in the 4th quarter, Pittsburgh managed to tie the game with a 48-yard catch by Stallworth setting up Bradshaw's 1-yard touchdown pass to tight end Larry Brown. But this would be their last score as Denver soon took over the game. First, Jim Turner put the Broncos up 24–21 by kicking 44-yard field goal with 7:17 left on the clock. Then Jackson intercepted a pass from Bradshaw and returned it 32 yards to the Steelers 9-yard line, setting up Turner's 24-yard field goal to make the score 27–21. On Pittsburgh's ensuring drive, Jackson struck again, intercepting another pass and returning this one 17 yards to the Steelers 33. Rather than sitting on their one-score lead and trying to run out the clock with running plays, Denver took to the air, scoring the game clinching touchdown on Morton's 34-yard pass to Jack Dolbin with 1:44 left in the game.

Harris finished the game with 92 rushing yards, 4 receptions for 20 yards, and a touchdown. Morton only completed 11 of 23 passes, but he threw for 167 yards and two touchdowns with no interceptions.

This was the first postseason meeting between the Steelers and Broncos.

=== Monday, December 26, 1977 ===
==== NFC: Dallas Cowboys 37, Chicago Bears 7 ====
Chicago Bears vs. Dallas Cowboys – Game summary

Quarter	1	2	3	4	Total
Bears	0	0	0	7	7
Cowboys	7	10	17	3	37

at Texas Stadium, Irving, Texas

- Game time: 2:00 p.m. EST
- Game weather: 49 °F (9 °C), mostly cloudy
- Game attendance: 63,260
- Referee: Gordon McCarter
- TV announcers (CBS): Pat Summerall and Tom Brookshier

Game information

First quarter

- DAL – Doug Dennison 2-yard run (Efren Herrera kick). Cowboys 7–0.

Second quarter

- DAL – Billy Joe DuPree 28-yard pass from Roger Staubach (Efren Herrera kick). Cowboys 14–0.
- DAL – Efren Herrera 21-yard field goal. Cowboys 17–0.

Third quarter

- DAL – Tony Dorsett 23-yard run (Efren Herrera kick). Cowboys 24–0.
- DAL – Efren Herrera 31-yard field goal. Cowboys 27–0.
- DAL – Tony Dorsett 7-yard run (Efren Herrera kick). Cowboys 34–0.

Fourth quarter

- DAL – Efren Herrera 27-yard field goal. Cowboys 37–0.
- CHI – Steve Schubert 34-yard pass from Bob Avellini (Bob Thomas kick). Cowboys 37–7.

Top passers

- CHI – Bob Avellini – 15/25, 177 yards, TD, 4 INT
- DAL – Roger Staubach – 8/13, 134 yards, TD, INT

Top rushers

- CHI – Walter Payton – 19 rushes, 60 yards
- DAL – Tony Dorsett – 17 rushes, 85 yards, 2 TD

Top receivers

- CHI – Steve Schubert – 5 receptions, 69 yards, TD
- DAL – Drew Pearson – 2 receptions, 38 yards

Safety Charlie Waters led the Cowboys to a 37–7 victory by setting an NFL playoff record of 3 interceptions. Chicago lost 7 turnovers by the end of the game and finished with just 224 total yards. Running back Walter Payton, the NFL's leading rusher with 1,852 yards during the season, was held to just 60 yards on 19 carries (though he did have 33 additional yards on 3 receptions and 57 return yards from three kickoffs).

Dallas built a 17–0 halftime lead, starting out the scoring with Roger Staubach's 32-yard completion to Tony Dorsett that set up Doug Dennison's 2-yard touchdown run. Staubach later completed a 31-yard pass to Drew Pearson before finding tight end Billy Joe Dupree over the goal line for a 28-yard touchdown pass, and Efrén Herrera added a 21-yard field goal to give Dallas a 17–0 first half lead. Chicago had a chance to make it 17–7 before halftime with a drive inside the Dallas red zone, but Waters put an end to it by intercepting Bob Avellini in the end zone.

On the first play of the second half, Cowboys linebacker D. D. Lewis intercepted an Avellini pass, and Dallas converted it into another touchdown on Dorsett's 23-yard run. Then Avellini lost a fumble on the Bears ensuing possession, leading to a 31-yard Herrera field goal. Before the end of the game, Dallas added 10 more points to their lead on Dorsett's 7-yard run and Herrera's 27-yard kick, while their defense limited Chicago to a useless touchdown on a 34-yard pass from Avellini to Steve Schubert with 7:03 left in the game.

Dallas finished the game with 365 total yards, including 233 on the ground. Dorsett led the way with 85 rushing yards, 37 receiving yards, and two touchdowns. Fullback Robert Newhouse added 80 more yards on the ground, and a 13-yard catch.

This was the Bears' first playoff game since winning the 1963 NFL championship.

This was the first postseason meeting between the Bears and Cowboys.

==== NFC: Minnesota Vikings 14, Los Angeles Rams 7 ====
Minnesota Vikings vs. Los Angeles Rams – Game summary

Quarter	1	2	3	4	Total
Vikings	7	0	0	7	14
Rams	0	0	0	7	7

at Los Angeles Memorial Coliseum, Los Angeles

- Game time: 6:00 p.m. EST
- Game weather: 59 °F (15 °C), rain
- Game attendance: 70,203
- Referee: Ben Dreith
- TV announcers (CBS): Vin Scully and Alex Hawkins

Game information

First quarter

- MIN – Chuck Foreman 5-yard run (Fred Cox kick). Vikings 7–0.

Second quarter

- No scoring plays.

Third quarter

- No scoring plays.

Fourth quarter

- MIN – Sammy Johnson 1-yard run (Fred Cox kick). Vikings 14–0.
- LA – Harold Jackson 1-yard pass from Pat Haden (Rafael Septién kick). Vikings 14–7.

Top passers

- MIN – Bob Lee – 5/10, 57 yards
- LA – Pat Haden – 14/32, 130 yards, TD, 3 INT

Top rushers

- MIN – Chuck Foreman – 31 rushes, 101 yards, TD
- LA – Lawrence McCutcheon – 16 rushes, 102 yards

Top receivers

- MIN – Ahmad Rashad – 2 receptions, 37 yards
- LA – Terry Nelson – 5 receptions, 85 yards

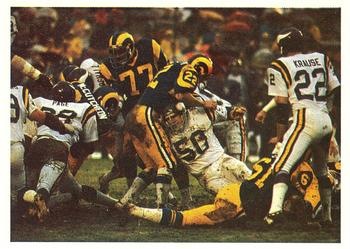
The Vikings' famed Purple People Eaters defensive line stopping a Rams rushing play in the NFC Divisional Playoff game.

The Rams had easily defeated an aging Vikings team in the regular season 35–3 in October on the nationally televised Monday Night Football, and after years of frustrating playoff losses in the cold of Minnesota, the Rams finally had a home playoff game against the Vikings. In addition, Viking quarterback Fran Tarkenton was injured in that Monday night game. However, as luck would have it, Los Angeles was engulfed in a torrential rainstorm, and the game became known as “The Mud Bowl”. Running back Chuck Foreman led the Vikings to a victory by recording 101 rushing yards on the heavy field. Minnesota head coach Bud Grant’s strategy was to have quarterback Bob Lee throw early before the field lost traction. By the end of the game, the Rams had three turnovers, while the Vikings didn't have any.

The Rams took the opening kickoff and moved the ball to the Minnesota 31. However, Alan Page ended the drive by dropping RB Lawrence McCutcheon for a 1-yard loss on 4th down and 2. The Vikings took over and drove 70 yards, with Lee completing 5/5 passes, to a 7-0 lead on a 5-yard scoring run by Foreman. Lee threw only five more passes the remainder of the game (completing zero) as the field conditions worsened and the Vikings went strictly into "control the clock" mode.

From that point on until the fourth quarter, both teams remained scoreless while the field turned into a quagmire. The Rams had two chances to score, but quarterback Pat Haden threw an interception to Nate Allen in the end zone and kicker Rafael Septién missed a field goal. Early in the final period, Vikings running back Manfred Moore returned a punt 21 yards to set up Sammy Johnson's 1-yard rushing touchdown. With less than a minute left in the game, Haden threw a 1-yard touchdown pass to Harold Jackson to cut the score 14–7. The Rams then recovered the ensuing onside kick, but safety Jeff Wright intercepted Haden's desperate pass in the end zone on the game's final play.

This was the fourth postseason meeting between the Vikings and Rams. Minnesota won all three previous meetings.

Previous playoff games
Minnesota leads 3–0 in all-time playoff games

1969

Los Angeles Rams 20 @ Minnesota Vikings 23

1969 NFL Western Conf. playoff

1974

Los Angeles Rams 10 @ Minnesota Vikings 14

1974 NFC Championship Game

1976

Los Angeles Rams 13 @ Minnesota Vikings 24

1976 NFC Championship Game

== Conference championships ==
=== Sunday, January 1, 1978 ===
==== AFC: Denver Broncos 20, Oakland Raiders 17 ====
Oakland Raiders vs. Denver Broncos – Game summary

Quarter	1	2	3	4	Total
Raiders	3	0	0	14	17
Broncos	7	0	7	6	20

at Mile High Stadium, Denver, Colorado

- Game time: 2:00 p.m. EST
- Game weather: 20 °F (−7 °C) (approx.), sunny
- Game attendance: 75,044
- Referee: Chuck Heberling
- TV announcers (NBC): Dick Enberg and Len Dawson

Game information

First quarter

- OAK – Errol Mann 20-yard field goal. Raiders 3–0.
- DEN – Haven Moses 74-yard pass from Craig Morton (Jim Turner kick). Broncos 7–3.

Second quarter

- No scoring plays.

Third quarter

- DEN – Jon Keyworth 1-yard run (Jim Turner kick). Broncos 14–3.

Fourth quarter

- OAK – Dave Casper 7-yard pass from Ken Stabler (Errol Mann kick). Broncos 14–10.
- DEN – Haven Moses 12-yard pass from Craig Morton (kick failed). Broncos 20–10.
- OAK – Dave Casper 17-yard pass from Ken Stabler (Errol Mann kick). Broncos 20–17.

Top passers

- OAK – Ken Stabler – 17/35, 215 yards, 2 TD, INT
- DEN – Craig Morton – 10/20, 224 yards, 2 TD, INT

Top rushers

- OAK – Mark van Eeghen – 20 rushes, 71 yards
- DEN – Lonnie Perrin – 11 rushes, 42 yards

Top receivers

- OAK – Dave Casper – 5 receptions, 71 yards, 2 TD
- DEN – Haven Moses – 5 receptions, 168 yards, 2 TD

Despite a poor day from veteran kicker Jim Turner, who missed three field goals and had an extra point blocked, Denver converted two second half turnovers into touchdowns to edge out the defending Super Bowl champion Raiders.

Denver was forced to punt on their opening drive, and Bucky Dilts's kick went just 21 yards to the Oakland 43-yard line. Aided by two Broncos penalties, including a running into the punter call that enabled Oakland to avoid a three and out, the Raiders subsequently drove to the Denver 2-yard line and scored with Errol Mann's 20-yard field goal. But on the Broncos' second drive, quarterback Craig Morton threw a 74-yard touchdown to wide receiver Haven Moses, who caught the ball along the right sideline and managed to break through a tackle attempt by Skip Thomas and stay in bounds on the way to the end zone. The score would remain 7–3 for the rest of the half, with Mann hitting the uprights on a 30-yard field goal try and Turner missing a 40-yard attempt. The Raiders also suffered a major setback when receiver Fred Biletnikoff went down with a separated shoulder.

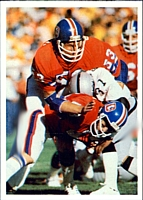
The Broncos' famed Orange Crush Defense stopping a Raiders offensive play in the AFC Championship Game.

Oakland's Carl Garrett returned the second half kickoff 62 yards to the Broncos 33-yard line. On first down, Ken Stabler tried to connect with Cliff Branch in the end zone, but Steve Foley barely managed to deflect the pass away. Then running back Mark van Eeghen was held to a 1-yard gain, Stabler threw a third down incompletion, and the Raiders decided to punt rather than risk a 49-yard field goal. Denver took after and drove deep into Raiders territory, with Moses hauling in a 41-yard reception to give the Broncos another scoring chance, but following a bad snap, Turner missed another field goal, this one from 31 yards. On the next play, Oakland's Clarence Davis lost a fumble that defensive end Brison Manor recovered at the Oakland 17-yard line. A short carry from fullback Jon Keyworth and Morton's 13-yard completion then moved the ball to the 2. Then running back Rob Lytle was hit in mid-air while trying to dive over the line by Raiders safety Jack Tatum, and lost the ball. Oakland nose tackle Mike McCoy appeared to recover the fumble, but the play was blown dead by an official on the opposite side of the field. The officials (chiefly Ed Marion) ruled that Lytle's forward progress was stopped before the fumble, even though replays clearly showed the ball was knocked free at the moment of contact. Denver retained possession. The Raiders were then penalized half the distance to the goal for arguing the call, and Keyworth scored a Denver touchdown on the next play to give Denver a 14–3 lead.

Later on, Denver recovered a muffed punt from Garrett on the Raiders 27-yard line. Right after the turnover, Morton appeared to throw a touchdown pass to Jack Dolbin, who made a rolling catch along the ground and then got up and headed for the end zone. However, officials ruled the ball had touched the ground before he secured the catch (replays appeared to contradict this) and it was called as an incompletion. Following two more incomplete passes, Turner missed his third field goal of the day, this time from 44 yards, and the Broncos came up empty.

Near the end of the third quarter, Oakland finally caught a break when Garrett returned Dilts' 38-yard punt 4 yards to the Broncos 48-yard line. On the next play, Van Eeghen rushed for 13 yards. Following an incompletion, Stabler fired a pass to tight end Dave Casper, who made a falling catch, got back up, and took off for a 26-yard gain to the Denver 9. Two plays later, Stabler finished the drive with a 7-yard touchdown pass to Casper on the second play of the fourth quarter, cutting the score to 14–10. Denver responded by advancing the ball to the Raiders 11-yard line, only to have linebacker Floyd Rice intercept the ball from Morton and take it 11 yards back to the 22. Oakland now seemed primed to drive for a leading touchdown, but before they could get out of their own territory, Denver linebacker Bob Swenson made a clutch interception and returned the ball 14 yards to the Oakland 17-yard line. Two plays later, Moses made a sliding 12-yard catch of Morton's pass in the end zone, putting the Broncos ahead 20–10 after Turner's extra point was blocked. Oakland struck back with an 8-play, 74-yard drive to score on Casper's 17-yard touchdown catch to make it 20–17 with 3:16 left in regulation, but the Broncos' held the ball for the rest of the game and ran out the clock.

Moses was responsible for most of Denver's 217 yards gained through the air, finishing the game with 5 receptions for 168 yards and two touchdowns. Morton completed 10/20 passes for 224 yards and two touchdowns, with one interception. Stabler finished 17/35 for 215 yards and two touchdowns with one pick. Garrett returned 3 kickoffs for 111 yards and two punts for 5.

With his two touchdown catches along with his three against the Colts, Casper set a single post-season record for touchdowns by a tight end (5) which still stands to this day.

This was the first postseason meeting between the Raiders and Broncos.

==== NFC: Dallas Cowboys 23, Minnesota Vikings 6 ====
Minnesota Vikings vs. Dallas Cowboys – Game summary

Quarter	1	2	3	4	Total
Vikings	0	6	0	0	6
Cowboys	6	10	0	7	23

at Texas Stadium, Irving, Texas

- Game time: 5:00 p.m. EST
- Game weather: 30 °F (−1 °C), cloudy
- Game attendance: 64,293
- Referee: Pat Haggerty
- TV announcers (CBS): Vin Scully and Alex Hawkins

Game information

First quarter

- DAL – Golden Richards 32-yard pass from Roger Staubach (kick blocked). Cowboys 6–0.

Second quarter

- DAL – Robert Newhouse 5-yard run (Efren Herrera kick). Cowboys 13–0.
- MIN – Fred Cox 32-yard field goal. Cowboys 13–3.
- MIN – Fred Cox 37-yard field goal. Cowboys 13–6.
- DAL – Efren Herrera 21-yard field goal. Cowboys 16–6.

Third quarter

- No scoring plays.

Fourth quarter

- DAL – Tony Dorsett 11-yard run (Efren Herrera kick). Cowboys 23–6.

Top passers

- MIN – Bob Lee – 14/24, 158 yards, 3 INT
- DAL – Roger Staubach – 12/22, 165 yards, TD, INT

Top rushers

- MIN – Chuck Foreman – 21 rushes, 59 yards
- DAL – Tony Dorsett – 19 rushes, 71 yards, TD

Top receivers

- MIN – Sammy White – 3 receptions, 46 yards
- DAL – Drew Pearson – 4 receptions, 62 yards

The Cowboys defense held the Vikings to 214 total yards, 66 rushing yards and 6 points, while forcing them to lose 4 turnovers. Minnesota again started quarterback Bob Lee, who was playing for the injured Fran Tarkenton.

Dallas took the early lead after defensive end Harvey Martin recovered a fumble from Vikings running back Robert Miller on the third play of the game, giving the Cowboys a first down on the Minnesota 39-yard line. Following 7-yard run by Robert Newhouse, Dallas scored on Roger Staubach's 32-yard touchdown pass to receiver Golden Richards, giving the team a 6–0 lead after Efrén Herrera missed the extra point. Later in the quarter, Minnesota had a big chance to score when a Dallas punt back near their goal line gave the Vikings a first down on the Dallas 45-yard line. But this drive was snuffed out by defensive lineman Ed "Too Tall" Jones, who stormed into the Vikings backfield to tackle running back Chuck Foreman immediately after taking a handoff, forcing a fumble that was recovered by Martin.

In the second quarter, Dallas took advantage of a short field after Butch Johnson returned a punt 4 yards to the Vikings 46. The team then drove 46 yards in 8 plays, including a 14-yard run by Danny White on a fake punt, to score on Newhouse's 5-yard rushing touchdown. Vikings receiver Sammy White returned the kickoff 37 yards to the 48-yard line. On the next play, a 44-yard pass interference penalty on Charlie Waters gave Minnesota a first down on the Dallas 8. But after Foreman was stuffed on two running plays, defensive tackle Randy White sacked Lee on the 16-yard line, forcing the Vikings to settle for a 13–3 deficit from Fred Cox's 33-yard field goal. Then after forcing a punt, Lee completed passes to Stu Voigt and Sammy White for gains of 19 and 16 yards as the team drove 68 yards to score on Cox's 37-yard field goal, making the score 13–6 with less than two minutes left in the half. Dallas struck back with a 32-yard completion from Staubach to running back Preston Pearson setting up Herrera's 21-yard field goal, giving the team a 16–6 lead going into halftime.

Minnesota mounted a mild scoring threat early in the third quarter when a 28-yard completion from Lee to White gave them a first down on the Dallas 34, but they could go no further and ended up punting. Near the end of the quarter, Dallas had a huge chance to increase their lead with a drive inside the Vikings 15-yard line. But Minnesota safety Jeff Wright forced a fumble from Tony Dorsett that was recovered by linebacker Fred McNeill.

In the fourth quarter, Cowboys linebacker Thomas Henderson forced Vikings punt returner Manfred Moore to fumble and it was recovered by Dallas tight end Jay Saldi. Five plays later, Dorsett rushed for an 11-yard touchdown to put the game away.

During the first quarter, a fan in dressed in a snowman suit, 24-year old Daniel Yoder, was accidentally set on fire when he bumped into a flaming can of liquid fuel being used by a girl selling hot chocolate in the stands. Yoder was completely engulfed in flames, but other spectators managed to put out the fire and he survived with second-degree burns.

This was the fourth postseason meeting between the Vikings and Cowboys. Dallas won two of the previous three meetings.

Previous playoff games
Dallas leads 2–1 in all-time playoff games

1971

Dallas Cowboys 20 @ Minnesota Vikings 12

1971 NFC Divisional playoffs

1973

Minnesota Vikings 27 @ Dallas Cowboys 10

1973 NFC Championship Game

1975

Dallas Cowboys 17 @ Minnesota Vikings 14

1975 NFC Divisional playoffs

== Super Bowl XII: Dallas Cowboys 27, Denver Broncos 10 ==
Super Bowl XII – Dallas Cowboys vs. Denver Broncos – Game summary

Quarter	1	2	3	4	Total
Cowboys (NFC)	10	3	7	7	27
Broncos (AFC)	0	0	10	0	10

at Louisiana Superdome, New Orleans, Louisiana

- Date: January 15, 1978
- Game attendance: 76,400
- Referee: Jim Tunney
- TV announcers (CBS): Pat Summerall and Tom Brookshier

This was the first Super Bowl meeting between the Cowboys and Broncos.

== Trivia ==
- The Denver Broncos were making their first trip to the postseason. Denver was the last of the old AFL teams to make it to the playoffs.
- Denver was the first team to win a conference championship in their first playoff appearance. The only team to accomplish that feat since was the 2000 Baltimore Ravens, who are officially considered a quasi-expansion team even though they inherited their original roster from the Cleveland Browns in 1996.
- This was the only time that both conference champions defeated their conference's defending champion in the playoffs, with Denver beating Oakland and Dallas downing Minnesota.
- The Colts–Raiders divisional round game was the third playoff game to go into double overtime. The two previous ones were the 1962 AFL Championship (Dallas Texans vs. Houston Oilers) and the 1971 AFC divisional round game (Miami Dolphins vs. Kansas City Chiefs.)
- The AFC Championship Game was the first where both contestants were founding members of the AFL.
- The Dallas Cowboys' Super Bowl XII victory over the Denver Broncos was their second such win of the 1970s, having previously beaten the Miami Dolphins in Super Bowl VI (1971-72 NFL Playoffs). In each case, Dallas' AFC opponent had scored back-to-back playoff wins over the previous two Super Bowl Champions, Denver having defeated Pittsburgh (X) and Oakland (XI), and Miami having defeated Kansas City (IV) and Baltimore (V)
- This game marks the only time in NFL history that a referee, Jim Tunney, worked in consecutive Super Bowls.
- No teams in the Eastern Time Zone were in either conference championship game. This would not happen again until the 2019 NFL season.
