= Orange Crush Defense =

1970s Denver Broncos defense

The Orange Crush Defense was the 3–4 defense of the Denver Broncos during the late 1970s and early 1980s. The National Football League (NFL) team adopted the 3–4 defense during the 1976 season, and the nickname "Orange Crush" for the team's defense was popularized early in the 1977 season by sportswriter/broadcaster Woody Paige.

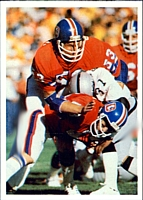
Randy Gradishar (53) in the 1977 AFC Championship Game

It was one of the top defenses of its time with linebackers Tom Jackson and Hall of Famer Randy Gradishar. Other key players were defensive linemen Paul Smith (a two-time Pro Bowl selection), Barney Chavous, Lyle Alzado, and Rubin Carter, linebackers Bob Swenson and Joe Rizzo, and defensive backs Billy Thompson, Louis Wright, Steve Foley, and Bernard Jackson.

In early 1977, head coach John Ralston stepped down after his best season and New England offensive line coach Red Miller was brought in to guide an already talented team to their first playoff berth. Now led by Miller, coordinator Joe Collier, and eventual Hall of Fame-inducted defensive line coach Stan Jones, the defense quickly became dominant in the 1977 season by starting 6-0 and allowing 46 total points in those games, popularizing their nickname. The Broncos finished the season 12–2 and made their first post-season appearance, where they advanced to Super Bowl XII after home playoff wins over Pittsburgh and Oakland, winners of the previous three Super Bowls. The 1977 Broncos had the NFL's number-one defense against the rush and were 11th (of 28 teams) against the pass using the NFL Passer Rating. The third fewest in the league, they only let up 10.6 points per game.

The team's defensive unit derived their nickname from their orange home jerseys and a popular soft drink, Orange Crush. This delighted the makers of the soft drink, based in Illinois near Chicago.

The use of the term has resurfaced in more recent years, most notably in reference to the Broncos' 2015 season.
