= Super Bowl XII =

1978 Edition of the Super Bowl

Dallas Cowboys (1) (NFC) (12–2)	Denver Broncos (1) (AFC) (12–2)
27	10
Head coach: Tom Landry	Head coach: Red Miller
	1	2	3	4	Total
DAL	10	3	7	7	27
DEN	0	0	10	0	10
- Date: January 15, 1978
- Kickoff time: 5:17 p.m. CST (UTC-6)
- Stadium: Louisiana Superdome; New Orleans, Louisiana
- MVP: Harvey Martin, DE; Randy White, DT
- Favorite: Cowboys by 6
- Referee: Jim Tunney
- Attendance: 75,583

Ceremonies
- National anthem: Phyllis Kelly of Northeast Louisiana University
- Coin toss: Red Grange
- Halftime show: "From Paris to the Paris of America" with the Tyler Junior College Apache Belles, Pete Fountain, and Al Hirt

TV in the United States
- Network: CBS
- Announcers: Pat Summerall and Tom Brookshier
- Nielsen ratings: 47.2 (78.94 million viewers)
- Market share: 67
- Cost of 30-second commercial: $162,000

Radio in the United States
- Network: CBS Radio
- Announcers: Jack Buck, Jim Kelly and Sonny Jurgensen

Super Bowl XII was an American football game between the National Football Conference (NFC) champion Dallas Cowboys and the American Football Conference (AFC) champion Denver Broncos to decide the National Football League (NFL) champion for the 1977 season. The Cowboys defeated the Broncos 27–10 to win their second Super Bowl. The game was played on January 15, 1978, at the Louisiana Superdome in New Orleans. This was the first Super Bowl in a domed stadium, and the first time that the game was played in prime time in the Eastern United States.

The game pitted Cowboys quarterback Roger Staubach against their former quarterback, Craig Morton. Led by Staubach and the Doomsday Defense, Dallas advanced to its fourth Super Bowl after posting a 12–2 record in the regular season and home playoff victories over the Chicago Bears and Minnesota Vikings. The Broncos, led by Morton and the Orange Crush Defense, made their first-ever postseason appearance after a franchise-best 12–2 regular season record. Also with home-field advantage, Denver posted playoff wins over the Pittsburgh Steelers and Oakland Raiders.

The Cowboys defense dominated Super Bowl XII, forcing eight turnovers and allowing only eight pass completions by the Broncos for 61 yards. Two interceptions led to 10 first-quarter points. Denver's longest play of the game was 21 yards, which occurred on their opening drive. Dallas extended its lead to 20–3 in the third quarter after wide receiver Butch Johnson made a diving catch in the end zone for a 45-yard touchdown reception. An ineffective Morton (who became the only quarterback to post a zero passer rating in a Super Bowl) was replaced by Norris Weese late in the third quarter. He drove the Broncos downfield to score a touchdown to close the gap on the lead to 20–10, capped by a Rob Lytle one-yard touchdown run. However, the Cowboys put the game out of reach in the fourth quarter when fullback Robert Newhouse threw a 29-yard touchdown pass on a halfback option play to receiver Golden Richards.

For the first and only time, two players won Super Bowl MVP honors: defensive tackle Randy White and defensive end Harvey Martin. This was also the first time that a defensive lineman was named Super Bowl MVP.

== Background ==
=== Host selection process ===
The NFL awarded Super Bowl XII to New Orleans on March 16, 1976, at the owners' meetings held in San Diego. It was the first of eight Super Bowls (as of 2025) to be played at the Louisiana Superdome. However, it was not the first one scheduled for the Superdome; Super Bowl IX was scheduled to be played there, but construction delays forced it to be played at Tulane Stadium.

A total of six cities submitted bids: New Orleans, Miami, Pasadena (Rose Bowl), Los Angeles (Coliseum), Dallas, and Houston. However, Dallas dropped out of the running due to a date conflict with a convention. A favorite going into the vote, New Orleans won on the fourth ballot after representatives promised they would prevent price gouging by the local hotels. In selecting the Superdome, owners rejected maintaining an AFC/NFC host site rotation, an unofficial, and mostly coincidental pattern that had been in place for several seasons.

=== Staubach v. Morton ===
The main storyline surrounding Super Bowl XII was Cowboys quarterback Roger Staubach versus Broncos quarterback Craig Morton. Morton began his career playing for Dallas in 1965. Staubach joined the Cowboys in 1969 after four years of service in the U.S. Navy, and soon both quarterbacks competed for the starting job. During the 1970 season, both Morton and Staubach started for about half of the regular season games. Morton was ultimately selected to lead the team through the playoffs and eventually to their Super Bowl V loss to the Baltimore Colts, 16–13. The next year, Staubach won the starting job and eventually led Dallas to defeat the Miami Dolphins in Super Bowl VI, 24–3. Staubach was also named Super Bowl MVP during that game. In 1972, Morton started most of the Cowboys' games as Staubach was out with a separated shoulder. However, in the division playoffs against San Francisco, Staubach relieved Morton and rallied the team to victory, which assured Staubach of the starting job going forward. Morton was relegated to backup status until he left the team in 1974 to join the New York Giants.

=== Morton and the Broncos' Orange Crush Defense ===
After spending three years with the Giants, Morton became the starting quarterback for the Broncos, a franchise with a dismal history. It had taken them 14 years (1960–1973) to record their first winning season and they had never once made the playoffs. But under the leadership of the newly arrived Morton and their new coach Red Miller, Denver finished 1977 with a 12–2 record and earned the #1 seed in the AFC.

Morton did not put up a large number of passing yards (1,929) during the regular season, but he threw 14 touchdown passes and only 8 interceptions, while also rushing for 125 yards and 4 touchdowns, earning him the NFL Comeback Player of the Year Award. Denver tight end Riley Odoms was his main target, with 37 receptions for 429 yards. Wide receiver Haven Moses was also a major deep threat, catching 27 passes for 539 yards, an average of 20 yards per catch. However, the Broncos main offensive strength was their rushing game. Denver had 3 running backs, Otis Armstrong, Lonnie Perrin, and Rob Lytle, who carried the ball equally, combining for 1,353 rushing yards and 10 touchdowns. On special teams, multi-talented wide receiver Rick Upchurch led the NFL with 653 punt return yards, while also catching 12 passes for 245 yards and recording 456 yards returning kickoffs.

The backbone of the Broncos was their defense, a unit known as the "Orange Crush", which used a 3–4 formation anchored by four superb linebackers, including Randy Gradishar (3 interceptions, 4 fumble recoveries) and Tom Jackson (4 interceptions, 93 return yards, 1 touchdown). Defensive End Lyle Alzado anchored the line, while their secondary was led by defensive backs Bill Thompson (who recorded 5 interceptions) and Louis Wright (who had 3 interceptions). The Broncos defense had given up just 148 points during the season, an average of just 10.6 per game and the 3rd-fewest in the NFL.

=== Staubach and the Cowboys' Doomsday Defense ===
With Staubach and his team's Doomsday Defense, the Cowboys won the NFC East with a 12–2 regular season record.

Staubach threw for 2,620 yards and 18 touchdowns with only 8 interceptions, while also gaining 171 rushing yards and 3 touchdowns on the ground. Wide receiver Drew Pearson was the leading receiver on the team with 48 receptions for 870 yards, while Pro Bowl tight end Billy Joe DuPree recorded 28 receptions for 347 yards and provided blocking support on running plays.

The Cowboys also had a new weapon on offense: rookie running back Tony Dorsett, the previous year's Heisman Trophy winner. Despite not becoming a full-time starter until the tenth game of the regular season, Dorsett led the team in rushing with 1,007 yards, scored 13 total touchdowns, and was the team's third leading receiver with 29 receptions for another 273 yards. Veteran fullback Robert Newhouse provided Dorsett with blocking, and was the team's second leading rusher with 721 yards, while also catching 16 passes for another 106 yards. Running back Preston Pearson contributed 341 yards rushing, caught 46 passes for 535 yards, and scored 5 touchdowns. The Cowboys' offensive line was led by All-Pro tackle Rayfield Wright.

Meanwhile, the Cowboys' Doomsday Defense remained in the superb form that helped lead the Cowboys' Super Bowl X appearance. Their defensive line consisted of Harvey Martin (who recorded 20 sacks and earned the National Football League Defensive Player of the Year Award), Jethro Pugh, Ed "Too Tall" Jones and Randy White. Behind them, the Cowboys had a trio of linebackers, Thomas Henderson (3 interceptions), D.D. Lewis, and Bob Breunig, who provided pass coverage and run stoppage. Dallas also had a secondary led by future Hall of Famers cornerback Mel Renfro and safety Cliff Harris and Pro Bowl safety Charlie Waters.

=== Playoffs ===
The Cowboys earned their second trip to the Super Bowl in three years by defeating the Chicago Bears, 37–7, and the Minnesota Vikings, 23–6, in the playoffs. Their "Doomsday Defense" proved as dominant as ever in those two games, forcing 7 turnovers against Chicago and 4 against the Vikings.

Meanwhile, the Broncos earned their first ever trip to the Super Bowl in team history by defeating the two previous league champions: the Pittsburgh Steelers, 34–21, and the Oakland Raiders, 20–17, in the playoffs. This made Morton the first quarterback to start a Super Bowl game for two different franchises, (Note: As of Super Bowl LVII, three other quarterbacks — Kurt Warner with the Rams and Cardinals, Peyton Manning with the Colts and Denver Broncos, and Tom Brady with the New England Patriots and Tampa Bay Buccaneers — also accomplished the feat.) and he remains the only quarterback to have started two different franchises' first Super Bowl appearances.

This was the final Super Bowl in the 14-game schedule era. The following season, the NFL went to a 16-game schedule, which remained in place through the 2020 NFL season, before being replaced by a 17-game regular season in 2021.

=== Super Bowl pregame news and notes ===
Super Bowl XII provided an opportunity for Morton to not only beat his former team, but also to redeem himself for his Super Bowl V loss and the loss of his starting job to Staubach. For Staubach, he had a chance to win his second Super Bowl and defeat his old rival, showing that he truly was the better quarterback of the two.

Tony Dorsett became the first football player in history to win a college football national championship one year (with the Pittsburgh Panthers) and a Super Bowl the next. Dorsett won both championships in the same building; Pitt clinched the 1976 national championship by defeating the Georgia Bulldogs in the Sugar Bowl on January 1, 1977.

Dallas was the only NFC team to win the Super Bowl during the 1970s (although both Baltimore and Pittsburgh were pre-merger NFL teams). Both Cowboy victories in the decade came in New Orleans against teams making their first Super Bowl appearance.

This was the first Super Bowl between two teams who had met in regular season play. The Cowboys defeated the Broncos 14–6 on the final Sunday of the regular season at Texas Stadium. Both teams' starters saw limited action in that contest, since both squads had already clinched their respective division championships and home-field advantage throughout the playoffs. Denver was 12–1 and Dallas 11–2 prior to the Dec 18 matchup. It was the first of only two times that two teams have played each other in the Super Bowl after playing on the final weekend of the regular season (the New York Giants and New England Patriots played in the final week of the 2007 regular season and met again in Super Bowl XLII). Under NFL scheduling rules put in place by Commissioner Roger Goodell prior to the 2010 season, the Super Bowl participants will no longer be able to play each other on the final weekend of the regular season, since all games on the final weekend now match division opponents.

The Broncos were the first team to wear a face mask color other than gray. Denver debuted white face masks in 1975 and wore them through 1996, prior to a complete redesign for 1997.

This was the first Super Bowl to feature arrow markers every ten yards, beginning at the 10 yard line, to indicate the direction of the nearest goal line, which were first used at Kansas City's Arrowhead Stadium in 1973. They became mandatory league-wide the following season in 1978.

== Broadcasting ==
The game was broadcast in the United States by CBS. It was the first Super Bowl played in prime time, with a kickoff time of 6:17 p.m. Eastern / 5:17 p.m. Central. Play-by-play announcer Pat Summerall and color commentator Tom Brookshier were in the broadcast booth. Hosting the coverage was The NFL Today hosts Brent Musburger; Irv Cross; Phyllis George (in the last game of her first stint on The NFL Today before leaving to host the short-lived People the following season). Also contributing were Hank Stram (who would be fired by the New Orleans Saints 13 days after the game); Jimmy "The Greek" Snyder; Sonny Jurgensen (working on CBS Radio coverage); Gary Bender; Paul Hornung; Nick Buoniconti and Jack Whitaker. Buoniconti and Hornung served as sideline reporters; with Hornung doing postgame interviews in the Broncos' locker room; while Bender covered the trophy presentation in the Cowboy locker room.

Local radio broadcasters were KRLD-AM in Dallas with Verne Lundquist and Brad Sham, and KOA-AM in Denver with Bob Martin and Larry Zimmer. Both broadcasts could be picked up in distant areas since KRLD and KOA are 50,000-watt Class A clear channel stations.

The broadcast used what was called the Electronic Palette graphics system (created by CBS and Ampex) for a painting-like aspect to several visual graphics; such as the game intro, starting lineups and bumpers going into or coming out of a commercial break. These graphics were done by sports artist LeRoy Neiman. CBS would also unveil what was known as the "Action Track"; showing the trail of a football that had been kicked during replays. Also, when the planned lead-in (the Phoenix Open golf tournament) was halted due to poor weather, CBS Sports president Robert Wussler (in New York) and producer Barry Frank (at the Superdome) ended up filling the time period with an impromptu look at how the game would be produced. As in their previous Super Bowl; CBS used the Frank Sinatra song "Winners" to play over the closing montage.

=== In popular culture ===
This game was featured in the All in the Family episode "Superbowl Sunday". Archie Bunker rented a big screen TV at his bar "Archie's Place" and sold ham sandwiches for $2.00. Later, two crooks (who were incognito throughout the episode) steal from and humiliate the patrons, by having them all pull down their pants, following the end of the game. Also, clips of some of the Cowboys' scoring plays were used to accompany the opening credits of the 1979 TV movie Dallas Cowboys Cheerleaders. Additional clips of this game also appeared in the NFL's Greatest Games episode Doomsday at the Dome.

== Entertainment ==
The pregame festivities featured the Southern University Band along with the cheerleaders of both teams. Later, Phyllis Kelly of Northeast Louisiana University sang the national anthem.

Pro Football Hall of Fame running back Red Grange participated in the coin toss ceremony. Prior to 1976, the official coin toss was held 30 minutes prior to kickoff and was re-enacted three minutes prior to kickoff to inform the television audience and spectators in the stadium of the outcome.

The halftime show was "From Paris to Paris of America" featuring performances by the Apache Band and Apache Belles Drill team from Tyler Junior College, clarinetist Pete Fountain, and trumpeter Al Hirt.

== Game summary ==
=== First quarter ===
The opening stages of the game were nearly disastrous for the Cowboys, who fumbled three times on their first two possessions, but did not turn the ball over on any of those fumbles. On their first play from scrimmage, Dallas attempted a double reverse, but wide receiver Butch Johnson fumbled the handoff. Johnson recovered his own fumble, but was sacked for a 9-yard loss by Denver linebacker Tom Jackson on the play, forcing the Cowboys to punt two plays later. The Broncos then advanced to the Dallas 33-yard line on their first drive of the game, aided by a fair catch interference penalty on Cowboys linebacker Thomas Henderson during the punt, enabling Denver to start on their own 47-yard line. Broncos quarterback Craig Morton completed a 16-yard pass to wide receiver Haven Moses, but was sacked for an 11-yard loss on third down by defensive tackle Randy White, which pushed the Broncos out of field goal range. On the ensuing Denver punt, Cowboys wide receiver Tony Hill muffed the ball at his own 1-yard line. In the scramble to recover, Broncos wide receiver John Schultz placed both of his hands on the ball and appeared to recover it for a touchdown, but the Cowboys emerged from the pile with the ball, still at their own 1-yard line. However, quarterback Roger Staubach managed to escape a sack for a safety and completed a 14-yard pass to running back Tony Dorsett. Two plays later, from the 19-yard line, Dorsett fumbled the ball forward into heavy traffic, but center John Fitzgerald made the recovery to keep possession for the Cowboys, who then punted.

On the Broncos' second possession, following an illegal use of hands penalty on Denver guard Tom Glassic, Randy White and defensive end Harvey Martin simultaneously hit Morton as he attempted to throw, which resulted in a wobbly pass that failed to cross the line of scrimmage and was intercepted by safety Randy Hughes on the Denver 25-yard line. The Cowboys capitalized on the turnover in five plays, which started with a 13-yard reception by tight end Billy Joe DuPree and ended with a 3-yard touchdown run by Dorsett, converting on a 4th-and-inches attempt and giving Dallas a 7–0 lead. On the Broncos' next possession, Schultz returned the kick 38 yards to the Denver 40, again giving them excellent field position. Two plays later, however, Morton was intercepted for a second time after his pass was tipped by linebacker Bob Breunig into the arms of cornerback Aaron Kyle, who returned the ball 20 yards to the Denver 35. Dallas then advanced to the Denver 8 on a 9-yard run by fullback Robert Newhouse and an 18-yard run by Dorsett, but Staubach was sacked by defensive end Lyle Alzado for a 10-yard loss on third down, forcing the Cowboys to settle for a 35-yard field goal by kicker Efrén Herrera to increase their lead to 10–0.

=== Second quarter ===
The Broncos were forced to punt to start the second quarter, and the Cowboys then advanced to the Denver 19 from their own 42, which featured a 19-yard pass by Staubach to DuPree. On third down, Staubach appeared to unleash a pass that was intercepted in the end zone by Broncos safety Bill Thompson; however, the officials ruled that Staubach had stepped out of bounds before he threw the ball. Herrera then kicked a 43-yard field goal to increase the Cowboys' lead to 13–0. The rest of the half was a seesaw of sloppy plays, turnovers, and missed opportunities. On the second play of the next Denver drive, Morton unleashed an errant pass intended for Moses for his third interception, this time by cornerback Benny Barnes at the Cowboys' 40-yard line. The Cowboys could not get points off of this turnover, as offensive tackle Ralph Neely was called for holding, which was followed by defensive tackle Rubin Carter sacking Staubach for a 5-yard loss, the fourth sack of the game for Denver, forcing a three-and-out and a punt. However, the punt struck an unsuspecting Schultz on his helmet as he attempted to throw a block during the return, and the ball was quickly recovered by Dallas linebacker Bruce Huther.

The Cowboys then advanced to the Broncos' 26 on a 14-yard run by Dorsett, but Herrera missed a 43-yard field goal attempt wide left, keeping the score 13–0. On their following drive, the Broncos committed their fifth turnover as wide receiver Jack Dolbin fumbled a 13-yard reception, while being tackled by safety Charlie Waters, with Hughes returning the ball 18 yards to the Denver 27-yard line. However, Dallas failed to score again as Herrera missed another field goal attempt wide right, this time from only 32 yards out. On the first play after that missed attempt, Denver yet again turned the ball over to Dallas when Kyle stripped the ball from tight end Riley Odoms, with Hughes recovering it again and returning it to the 28-yard line. However, on the next play, Dallas gave the ball right back to Denver as DuPree caught a 20-yard pass at the 8-yard line but fumbled after taking a hit from cornerback Steve Foley, with Tom Jackson making the recovery. Five plays later, with the Broncos desperate to get on the board before the end of the half, Morton uncorked yet another errant pass that was intercepted by cornerback Mark Washington who returned the ball 27 yards to Denver's 35-yard line. There were 6 seconds remaining on the clock after the interception, but Dallas yet again could not capitalize as Herrera missed yet another field goal attempt wide left, his third miss of the half, this time from 44 yards out, as time expired.

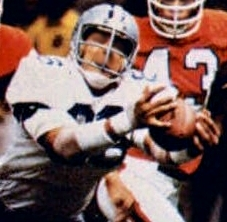
Johnson's touchdown catch gave Dallas a 20–3 lead over Denver.

By halftime, the Cowboys had fumbled five times (losing one), had missed three field goals, and had allowed four sacks, but still led 13–0. Meanwhile, the Broncos had committed a halftime record 7 turnovers. Morton, who had thrown only 8 interceptions during the entire 1977 season, was picked off 4 times in the half in addition to 3 fumbles lost, finishing with a passer rating of 0.0. Incredibly, after punting on their very first drive of the game, six of the next seven Broncos possessions resulted in a turnover, and there also was a fumble on a punt return.

=== Third quarter ===
On the opening drive of the second half, the Broncos moved the ball deep into Cowboys territory. First, Schultz returned the second half kickoff 25 yards to the Denver 35, and then running back Otis Armstrong took off for an 18-yard gain. Seven plays later, kicker Jim Turner put the Broncos on the board with a 47-yard field goal, cutting their deficit to 13–3. But after an exchange of punts, the Cowboys mounted a 59-yard scoring drive in six plays with Staubach completing a 13-yard pass to wide receiver Drew Pearson, followed by a 45-yard touchdown pass to Johnson, who made a fingertip catch as he fell into the end zone, increasing the Dallas lead to 20–3. Johnson dropped the ball when he hit the ground, but officials ruled it a touchdown before the ball came out of his hands.

Denver wide receiver Rick Upchurch returned the ensuing kickoff a Super Bowl-record 67 yards to the Cowboys 26-yard line. On the next play, Morton nearly threw his fifth interception to Cowboys defensive end Ed "Too Tall" Jones, and was then immediately replaced by backup quarterback Norris Weese. Two plays later, on 4th-and-1, running back Jim Jensen's 16-yard run moved the ball to the 1-yard line, and then running back Rob Lytle scored on a 1-yard touchdown run to cut Denver's deficit to 20–10.

=== Fourth quarter ===
Dallas drove to the Denver 35 on their next possession, but Staubach was strip-sacked by Tom Jackson, and Carter recovered the fumble at the Broncos' 45 on the second play of the quarter. However, Weese was incomplete on his next three attempts, one on a pass to Upchurch in the end zone, and Denver punted.

The Broncos forced a Cowboys punt, but Martin stripped the ball from Weese on third down, and Kyle recovered it on the Denver 29-yard line. On the next play, the Cowboys scored on a 29-yard halfback option play: Staubach pitched the ball to Newhouse, who ran left and then threw a pass to wide receiver Golden Richards for a touchdown, putting the game away for Dallas with a 27–10 lead. Newhouse became the first running back in Super Bowl history to throw a touchdown pass. Most notable about the trick play was that Denver's defense was not fooled by it, as Richards was properly covered by Foley. Incidentally, Newhouse had practiced with the play for weeks, but had not managed to complete the pass once in practice (which unlike the play in the game was done with Newhouse rolling to his right). Loaded up with stickum (legal at the time), Newhouse accomplished a tight spiral to Richards that he caught in stride for the score.

Denver, now playing for pride, reached the Dallas 25-yard line on their next possession, but turned the ball over on downs after a sack on Weese by linebacker D. D. Lewis, a delay of game penalty, and back-to-back incomplete passes. The Broncos then forced the Cowboys to punt, but a roughing the kicker penalty on Denver linebacker Rob Nairne gave Dallas a new set of downs, enabling them to run out the clock and end the game.

Staubach finished the game with 17 out of 25 pass completions for 183 yards and a touchdown, with no interceptions. Dorsett was the leading rusher of the game, with 66 rushing yards and a touchdown. He also caught 2 passes for 11 receiving yards. In addition to his 29-yard touchdown pass, Newhouse also contributed with 55 rushing yards. DuPree was the leading receiver of the game with 4 receptions for 66 yards. Hughes had an interception and a Super Bowl record two fumble recoveries.

Before being taken out of the game, Denver's starting quarterback Craig Morton completed just 4 out of 15 passes for 39 yards and was intercepted 4 times. His 21-yard completion to Haven Moses on the Broncos' opening drive was the only pass he completed that both resulted in positive yardage and did not end in a turnover. Morton's passer rating for the game was 0.0, the lowest in Super Bowl history. Upchurch recorded 125 total offensive yards (94 on kickoff returns, 22 on punt returns, and 9 receiving yards).

The Cowboys' superb defense played a critical role in the game. White and Martin were named co-Most Valuable Players; this award is usually bestowed on an offensive player. The voters actually wanted to name the entire 11-man starting defensive lineup as co-MVPs, and asked the NFL if this was acceptable. The league said no, and so two players were picked for the award. The unheralded Hughes and Kyle of the Cowboy secondary each had superb games to play an important role in the victory. The two men came up with five turnovers between them, leading directly to 17 of Dallas' points.

The game was the 8th Super Bowl in 10 years (following the first two won by Green Bay) in which the winning team scored enough to win before the losing team put up any points on the board (the exceptions were the two lost by the Cowboys to this point, Super Bowl V and Super Bowl X). Conversely, this feat has only occurred five times since (XV, XVIII, XXXV, XLVIII, and LIX).

In 2015, on the occasion of Super Bowl 50, Slate webpage writer Justin Peters watched all the games over a two-month period. He considered Super Bowl XII to be the worst Super Bowl ever. Morton was a large part of the reason for Peters, who felt the Broncos' quarterback was lucky to have only been intercepted four times in the first half, and a total output that amounted to only one completion for positive yardage that was not followed by an immediate turnover. Nor had the Cowboys impressed him, in large part due to Herrera's missed field goals in the second quarter. "Blowouts can at least be fun to watch sometimes", he concluded. "This game was nothing but pain."

=== Box score ===
Super Bowl XII: Dallas Cowboys 27, Denver Broncos 10

Quarter	1	2	3	4	Total
Cowboys (NFC)	10	3	7	7	27
Broncos (AFC)	0	0	10	0	10

at Louisiana Superdome, New Orleans, Louisiana

- Date: January 15, 1978
- Game time: 5:17 p.m. CST
- Game weather: 70 °F (21 °C), played indoors, domed stadium

Scoring summary

Quarter	Time	Drive			Team	Scoring information	Score	
Quarter	Time	Plays	Yards	TOP	Team	Scoring information	DAL	DEN
1	4:29	5	25	2:40	DAL	Tony Dorsett 3-yard touchdown run, Efrén Herrera kick good	7	0
1	1:31	5	17	1:56	DAL	35-yard field goal by Herrera	10	0
2	11:16	7	32	3:34	DAL	43-yard field goal by Herrera	13	0
3	12:32	8	35	2:28	DEN	47-yard field goal by Jim Turner	13	3
3	6:59	5	58	2:29	DAL	Butch Johnson 45-yard touchdown reception from Roger Staubach, Herrera kick good	20	3
3	5:39	5	26	1:20	DEN	Rob Lytle 1-yard touchdown run, Turner kick good	20	10
4	7:04	1	29	:07	DAL	Golden Richards 29-yard touchdown reception from Robert Newhouse, Herrera kick good	27	10
"TOP" = time of possession. For other American football terms, see Glossary of American football.							27	10

== Final statistics ==
Sources: NFL.com Super Bowl XII, Super Bowl XII Play Finder Dal, Super Bowl XII Play Finder Den

=== Statistical comparison ===
	Dallas Cowboys	Denver Broncos
First downs	17	11
First downs rushing	8	8
First downs passing	8	1
First downs penalty	1	2
Third down efficiency	5/17	1/12
Fourth down efficiency	1/1	2/3
Net yards rushing	143	121
Rushing attempts	38	29
Yards per rush	3.8	4.2
Passing – Completions/attempts	19/28	8/25
Times sacked-total yards	5–35	4–26
Interceptions thrown	0	4
Net yards passing	182	35
Total net yards	325	156
Punt returns-total yards	1–0	4–22
Kickoff returns-total yards	3–51	6–173
Interceptions-total return yards	4–46	0–0
Punts-average yardage	5–41.6	4–38.3
Fumbles-lost	6–2	4–4
Penalties-total yards	12–94	8–60
Time of possession	38:38	21:22
Turnovers	2	8

=== Individual statistics ===
Cowboys passing
	C/ATT^{1}	Yds	TD	INT	Rating
Roger Staubach	17/25	183	1	0	102.6
Robert Newhouse	1/1	29	1	0	158.3
Danny White	1/2	5	0	0	56.3
Cowboys rushing
	Car^{2}	Yds	TD	LG^{3}	Yds/Car
Tony Dorsett	15	66	1	19	4.40
Robert Newhouse	14	55	0	10	3.93
Danny White	1	13	0	13	13.00
Preston Pearson	3	11	0	5	3.67
Roger Staubach	3	6	0	5	2.00
Scott Laidlaw	1	1	0	1	1.00
Butch Johnson	1	–9	0	–9	-9.00
Cowboys receiving
	Rec^{4}	Yds	TD	LG^{3}	Target^{5}
Preston Pearson	5	37	0	11	7
Billy Joe DuPree	4	66	0	19	5
Robert Newhouse	3	–1	0	5	3
Butch Johnson	2	53	1	45	3
Golden Richards	2	38	1	29	3
Tony Dorsett	2	11	0	15	3
Drew Pearson	1	13	0	13	4

Broncos passing
	C/ATT^{1}	Yds	TD	INT	Rating
Craig Morton	4/15	39	0	4	0.0
Norris Weese	4/10	22	0	0	47.9
Broncos rushing
	Car^{2}	Yds	TD	LG^{3}	Yds/Car
Rob Lytle	10	35	1	16	3.50
Otis Armstrong	7	27	0	18	3.86
Norris Weese	3	26	0	10	8.67
Jim Jensen	1	16	0	16	16.00
Jon Keyworth	5	9	0	6	1.80
Lonnie Perrin	3	8	0	4	2.67
Broncos receiving
	Rec^{4}	Yds	TD	LG^{3}	Target^{5}
Jack Dolbin	2	24	0	15	5
Riley Odoms	2	9	0	10	3
Haven Moses	1	21	0	21	6
Rick Upchurch	1	9	0	9	3
Jim Jensen	1	5	0	5	1
Lonnie Perrin	1	–7	0	–7	1
Rob Lytle	0	0	0	0	1
Otis Armstrong	0	0	0	0	1

^{1}Completions/attempts ^{2}Carries ^{3}Long gain ^{4}Receptions ^{5}Times targeted

=== Records set ===
The following records were set in Super Bowl XII, according to the official NFL.com boxscore and the ProFootball reference.com game summary.
Some records have to meet NFL minimum number of attempts to be recognized. The minimums are shown (in parentheses).

Player records set
Passing records
Most passing yards, career	506	Roger Staubach (Dallas)
Most touchdown passes, career	5	Roger Staubach (Dallas)
Highest completion percentage, career, (40 attempts)	64.7% (44–68)	Roger Staubach (Dallas)
Most interceptions thrown, game	4	Craig Morton (Denver)
Most interceptions thrown, career	7	Craig Morton (Denver)
Fumbles
Most fumbles, career	4	Roger Staubach
Special Teams
Longest kickoff return	67 yards	Rick Upchurch (Denver)
Most kickoff return yards, game	94 yards	Rick Upchurch (Denver)
Highest kickoff return average, game (3 returns)	31.3 yards (3–94)	Rick Upchurch (Denver)
Most field goals attempted, career	6	Jim Turner (Denver)
Records tied
Most fumbles recovered, game	2	Randy Hughes (Dallas); Butch Johnson (Dallas)
Most fumbles recovered, career	2	John Fitzgerald (Dallas); Randy Hughes; Butch Johnson
Most field goals attempted, game	5	Efrén Herrera (Dallas)
Most field goals made, career	4	Jim Turner
Most 40-plus yard field goals, game	1	Efrén Herrera; Jim Turner

- ‡ Sacks an official statistic since Super Bowl XVII by the NFL. Sacks are listed as "Tackled Attempting to Pass" in the official NFL box score for Super Bowl XII.

Team records set
Passing
Lowest completion percentage (20 attempts)	32.0% (8–25)	Broncos
Fewest yards passing (net)	35	Broncos
Lowest average yards gained per pass attempt	1.4 yards (35–25)	Broncos
First downs
Fewest first downs passing	1	Broncos
Fumbles
Most fumbles, game	6	Cowboys
Most fumbles recovered, game	8	Cowboys
Turnovers
Most turnovers, game	8	Broncos
Kickoff returns
Most yards gained, game	173	Broncos
Highest average gain, game (3 returns)	28.8 yards (173–6)	Broncos
Penalties
Most penalties, game	12	Cowboys
Records tied
Most Super Bowl appearances	4	Cowboys
Most Super Bowl victories	2	Cowboys
Most passing touchdowns	2	Cowboys
Most field goals attempted	5	Cowboys
Most Interceptions by	4	Cowboys
Fewest points, first half	0	Broncos
Fewest passing touchdowns	0	Broncos
Most fumbles lost, game	4	Broncos

Turnovers are defined as the number of times losing the ball on interceptions and fumbles.

Records set, both team totals
	Total	Cowboys	Broncos
Points
Most points, third quarter	17	7	10
First downs
Fewest first downs, passing	9	8	1
Fumbles
Most fumbles	10	6	4
Most fumbles lost	6	2	4
Kickoff returns
Most yards gained	224	51	173
Penalties
Most penalties, game	20	12	8
Records tied
Most times sacked	9	5	4

== Starting lineups ==
Hall of Fame‡

Dallas	Position	Position	Denver
Offense
Butch Johnson	WR		Jack Dolbin
Ralph Neely	LT		Andy Maurer
Herbert Scott	LG		Tom Glassic
John Fitzgerald	C		Mike Montler
Tom Rafferty	RG		Paul Howard
Pat Donovan	RT		Claudie Minor
Billy Joe DuPree	TE		Riley Odoms
Drew Pearson‡	WR		Haven Moses
Roger Staubach‡	QB		Craig Morton
Tony Dorsett‡	RB		Otis Armstrong
Robert Newhouse	FB		Jon Keyworth
Defense
Ed Jones	LE		Barney Chavous
Jethro Pugh	LT	NT	Rubin Carter
Randy White‡	RT	RE	Lyle Alzado
Harvey Martin	RE	LLB	Bob Swenson
Thomas Henderson	LLB		Joe Rizzo
Bob Breunig	MLB	RLB	Randy Gradishar‡
D.D. Lewis	RLB		Tom Jackson
Benny Barnes	LCB		Louis Wright
Aaron Kyle	RCB		Steve Foley
Charlie Waters	SS		Bill Thompson
Cliff Harris‡	FS		Bernard Jackson

== Officials ==
- Referee: Jim Tunney #32 third Super Bowl (VI, XI)
- Umpire: Joe Connell #57 third Super Bowl (VI, X)
- Head linesman: Tony Veteri #36 third Super Bowl (II, VII)
- Line judge: Art Holst #33 second Super Bowl (VI)
- Back judge: Ray Douglas #5 second Super Bowl (IX)
- Field judge: Bob Wortman #84 second Super Bowl (VI)
- Alternate referee: Cal Lepore #72 worked Super Bowl III as line judge
- Alternate umpire: Frank Sinkovitz #20 would work Super Bowl XV

Note: A seven-official system was not used until the following season

Jim Tunney was the only referee to work consecutive Super Bowls. The NFL now prohibits referees from working Super Bowls in consecutive seasons (a referee can be an alternate the season following an on-field assignment), although officials at other positions can do so.

This was the first Super Bowl in which all officials had previously called one.

Five of the six officials—all except Veteri—previously worked a Super Bowl in New Orleans. Of those five, only Douglas was not on the crew for Super Bowl VI at Tulane Stadium.
