= Joe Rizzo (American football) =

American football player (born 1950)

No. 59
- Position: Linebacker

Personal information
- Born: December 17, 1950 (age 75); Glen Cove, New York, U.S.
- Listed height: 6 ft 1 in (1.85 m)
- Listed weight: 220 lb (100 kg)

Career information
- High school: Glen Cove
- College: Merchant Marine
- NFL draft: 1973: 15th round, 369th overall pick

Career history
- Denver Broncos (1974–1980)

Awards and highlights
- Denver Broncos Super Team 20; ECAC All-America; USMMA Hall of Fame

Career NFL statistics
- Games played: 81
- Interceptions: 9
- Stats at Pro Football Reference

Joe Rizzo (born December 17, 1950) is an American former professional football player who was a linebacker for the Denver Broncos of the National Football League (NFL). He played college football for the United States Merchant Marine Academy Mariners. He played for the Broncos from 1974 to 1980 and started in Super Bowl XII as a member of their famous Orange Crush Defense. He had nine career interceptions, and was part of one of the most dominant linebacker corps in NFL history. Known as the Orange Crush, it consisted of Rizzo, Randy Gradishar, Tom Jackson and Bob Swenson. The group was named the ninth-best linebacker corps in NFL history. Rizzo was also voted by Bronco fans as one of the top 10 linebackers in the 50-year history (1959–2009) of the Denver Broncos.
