= Paul Smith (defensive end) =

American football player (1945–2000)

No. 70, 78
- Positions: Defensive end, Defensive tackle

Personal information
- Born: August 13, 1945; Ada, Oklahoma, U.S.
- Died: March 14, 2000 (aged 54); Aurora, Colorado, U.S.
- Listed height: 6 ft 3 in (1.91 m)
- Listed weight: 256 lb (116 kg)

Career information
- High school: Roswell (Roswell, New Mexico)
- College: New Mexico
- NFL draft: 1968: 9th round, 222nd overall pick

Career history
- Denver Broncos (1968–1978); Washington Redskins (1979–1980)

Awards and highlights
- 2× Second-team All-Pro (1972, 1973); 2× Pro Bowl (1972, 1973); Denver Broncos Ring of Fame

Career NFL/AFL statistics
- Fumble recoveries: 7
- Interceptions: 2
- Touchdowns: 1
- Sacks: 57
- Stats at Pro Football Reference

Paul Edward Smith (August 13, 1945 – March 14, 2000) was an American professional football player who was a defensive end in the American Football League (AFL) and National Football League (NFL), primarily with the Denver Broncos. He played college football for the New Mexico Lobos.

== Early life ==
Smith was born in Ada, Oklahoma but raised in Roswell, New Mexico. He played college football for the New Mexico Lobos.

== Professional career ==
Smith was selected in the 1968 NFL/AFL draft by the Denver Broncos of the Denver Broncos in the ninth round with the 222nd overal pick. He later played in the NFL for the Broncos and Washington Redskins.

Smith played as a defensive tackle for his first season in 1968. He played in 12 games with three starts. He made his first recorded statistic in 1970 when he recovered a fumble once (unofficially, he recorded his first quarterback sacks that year, recording three in the year). In 1970, Smith became a full-time starter for every game, which he would do for four straight seasons. In those years, he unofficially (sacks did not become an official stat until 1982) did at least ten sacks in each year, with 1971 having his highest with 12. He was named to the Pro Bowl in 1972 and 1973; the Broncos, years away from building what became known as the "Orange Crush Defense", recorded their first winning season that year at 7-5-2. The 1974 seasons saw him play in only four games that year. The following year, he recorded his first touchdown on a fumble recovery against the Atlanta Falcons on November 23; it was the first and only career touchdown. Smith was an integral part of the defense that brought Denver its first playoff appearance in 1977. Under the tutelage of defensive coordinator Joe Collier, he set up a defense that had three down linemen on defense and four linebackers in what is now referred to as the 3–4 defense. Smith was asked to serve as one of the front man. That year, he recorded his first interception, with his only other one coming in his final year. He moved onto the Washington Redskins in 1979. He played in 31 total games with nine starts in two seasons before retiring at the age of 35.

In his Broncos career he posted 55.5 sacks. Smith wore number 70 with the Broncos and was inducted into the Denver Broncos' Ring of Fame in 1986 along with quarterbacks Frank Tripucka and Charley Johnson. The first Bronco to play ten seasons with the team, Smith has been regarded as one of the best defensive linemen in Broncos history.

== Personal life ==
Smith lived in Aurora, Colorado until March 14, 2000, when he died of Pancreatic cancer. He has a son named Paul Smith, who has three children: Paul Smith III, Amirah, and Layana.

== See also ==
- List of American Football League players
