= Andy Maurer =

American football player (1948–2016)

- Maurer in 1972

No. 64, 66, 61, 74
- Positions: Guard, tackle

Personal information
- Born: September 30, 1948; Silverton, Oregon, U.S.
- Died: January 2, 2016 (aged 67); Medford, Oregon, U.S.
- Listed height: 6 ft 3 in (1.91 m)
- Listed weight: 265 lb (120 kg)

Career information
- High school: Prospect (OR)
- College: Oregon
- NFL draft: 1970: 3rd round, 64th overall pick

Career history
- Atlanta Falcons (1970–1973); New Orleans Saints (1974); Minnesota Vikings (1974–1975); San Francisco 49ers (1976); Denver Broncos (1977)

Career NFL statistics
- Games played: 109
- Starts: 89
- Stats at Pro Football Reference

Andrew Lee Maurer (September 30, 1948 – January 3, 2016) was an American professional football offensive lineman in the NFL for the Atlanta Falcons, New Orleans Saints, Minnesota Vikings, San Francisco 49ers, and the Denver Broncos. He played in Super Bowl IX as a member of the Vikings and Super Bowl XII as a member of the Broncos. He appeared in 109 regular season games, starting 84 of them. Additionally, he started all seven playoff games he appeared in. Maurer played college football at the University of Oregon.

Maurer served as head football coach at Cascade Christian High School in Medford, Oregon, from 1992 to 2010. He died of cancer on January 3, 2016, at the age of 67.
