= Bucky Dilts =

American football player (born 1953)

No. 10
- Position: Punter

Personal information
- Born: December 6, 1953 (age 72); Corpus Christi, Texas
- Listed height: 5 ft 9 in (1.75 m)
- Listed weight: 185 lb (84 kg)

Career information
- High school: Dykes HS (Atlanta, Georgia)
- College: Georgia
- NFL draft: 1977: undrafted

Career history
- Denver Broncos (1977–1978); Baltimore Colts (1979)

Awards and highlights
- PFWA All-Rookie Team (1977)

Career NFL statistics
- Punts: 285
- Punting yards: 10,676
- Average punt: 37.5
- Longest punt: 73
- Stats at Pro Football Reference

Douglas Riggs "Bucky" Dilts is a former punter for three years in the National Football League. He played in Super Bowl XII for the Denver Broncos.

== College career ==
Dilts attended the University of Georgia where he was a member of Chi Phi fraternity. He was the left-footed punter for the Georgia Bulldogs from 1974 to 1976 and played for the legendary Vince Dooley. He appeared in three bowl games, including the 1976 Cotton Bowl Classic and the 1977 Sugar Bowl and was a member of the 1976 SEC Championship Team.

== Professional career ==
Dilts was signed as an undrafted free agent by the Denver Broncos in 1977. He played two years for the Broncos, including an appearance in Super Bowl XII against the Dallas Cowboys. In 1979, he played for the Baltimore Colts. The following year, after he did not receive any offers from any teams, he retired from football and went to work in sales and marketing in the Denver-Boulder area in Colorado.
