= Jim Jensen (running back) =

American football player (born 1953)

No. 37, 30, 33
- Positions: Running back, tight end

Personal information
- Born: November 28, 1953 (age 72); Waterloo, Iowa, U.S.
- Listed height: 6 ft 3 in (1.91 m)
- Listed weight: 232 lb (105 kg)

Career information
- High school: Davenport Central (Davenport, Iowa)
- College: Iowa
- NFL draft: 1976: 2nd round, 40th overall pick

Career history
- Dallas Cowboys (1976); Denver Broncos (1977–1980); Green Bay Packers (1981–1982)

Career NFL statistics
- Rushing attempts: 283
- Rushing yards: 1,126
- Receptions: 80
- Receiving yards: 651
- Total TDs: 7
- Stats at Pro Football Reference

James Douglas Jensen (born November 28, 1953) is an American former professional football player who was a running back in the National Football League (NFL) for the Dallas Cowboys, Denver Broncos, and Green Bay Packers. He played college football at the University of Iowa.

== Early life ==
Jensen attended Davenport Central High School where he was a multiple state champion in track and field, winning the indoor high and low hurdles, the pentathlon, the outdoor high hurdles and was a member of the state champion mile medley relay team.

He accepted a football scholarship from the University of Iowa. Measuring 6' 3", 230 lbs. and running a 4.4 40-yard dash, he earned eight varsity letters, four in football and four in track and field.

In football, he was the team's leading rusher as a sophomore and junior, finishing his career with 367 carries for 1,661 rushing yards (4.5-yard avg.) and 9 touchdowns. In track, he competed as a hurdler. In the 1975 Senior Bowl, he played fullback and was the game's leading rusher.

In 1988, he was inducted into the Iowa High School Sports Hall of Fame and to the Quad Cities Sports Hall of Fame in 2002.

== Professional career ==
=== Dallas Cowboys ===
Jensen was selected by the Dallas Cowboys in the second round (40th overall) of the 1976 NFL draft. As a rookie, he played mainly on special teams, and because of his versatility and size, he was moved between running back and tight end.

In 1977, he became expendable when Tony Dorsett was selected, so he was traded to the Denver Broncos in exchange for a sixth round draft choice (#160-Mike Salzano), after never having a rushing attempt with the Cowboys.

=== Denver Broncos ===
Jensen was a versatile running back for the Denver Broncos and helped the team reach Super Bowl XII in 1977, playing against his former teammates. In 1978, he was placed on the injured reserve list with a knee injury. He led the team in rushing (476 yards) and receptions (49) in 1980. The next year, he was released before the season started.

=== Green Bay Packers ===
On September 9, 1981, he signed as a free agent with the Green Bay Packers, to be the backup for Gerry Ellis and to play special teams.

On September 7, 1982, he was released. On September 13, one day after the Packers defeated the Los Angeles Rams in their season opener, he was re-signed to replace an injured Ellis. With Bart Starr as the head coach, in 1982 the Packers made their first appearance in the playoffs after a 10-year drought. On April 15, 1983, he announced his retirement.

== Personal life ==
Following his retirement from the National Football League, he made his home in Colorado and entered the advertising/marketing/public relations field. He has three children: Jessica, Cody and Jack, one grand daughter, Savannah, and one brother, Andy. He currently lives in Minnesota at Rose Lake near Vergas, and is a consultant for advertising, public relations, communications, marketing and special events projects. He also is a corporate motivational speaker and paints, writes and pursues life adventures in his spare time.

Jensen is an avid motorcyclist and enjoys traveling into MX and to other off-the-beaten-path places. He also enjoys fly tying and fly fishing for warm water species, upland bird hunting, archery and running. He created the annual Run 'Round the Rose 12 Mile Run for Diabetes in Vergas, MN in honor of his mother, Lois, who had adult onset diabetes for her entire adult life. He has competed in this race since its inception and finished third in the Masters category in 2009. He also is an accomplished, and published, photographer, columnist and artist. He has written for the Rocky Mountain News, Greeley Tribune, WindsorNOW! and Thunder Press magazine.

He credits a lot of his accomplishments in life to the influence of several key people: his father, John, a World War II veteran and son of a Danish immigrant, his high school coaches Jim Fox and Ira Dunsworth, Broncos head coach Red Miller, assistant coach Paul Roach, and Bill Reichardt (University of Iowa Big Ten MVP running back in 1951).
