= John Schultz (American football) =

American football player (born 1953)

No. 84, 86
- Position: Wide receiver

Personal information
- Born: June 10, 1953 (age 73); Binghamton, New York, U.S.
- Listed height: 5 ft 10 in (1.78 m)
- Listed weight: 182 lb (83 kg)

Career information
- High school: Vestal (Vestal, New York)
- College: Maryland
- NFL draft: 1976: undrafted

Career history
- Denver Broncos (1976–1978)
- Stats at Pro Football Reference

John Andreas Schultz (born June 10, 1953) is an American former professional football player who was a wide receiver for the Denver Broncos of National Football League (NFL). He played college football for the Maryland Terrapins.
