= Brison Manor =

American football player (1952–2023)

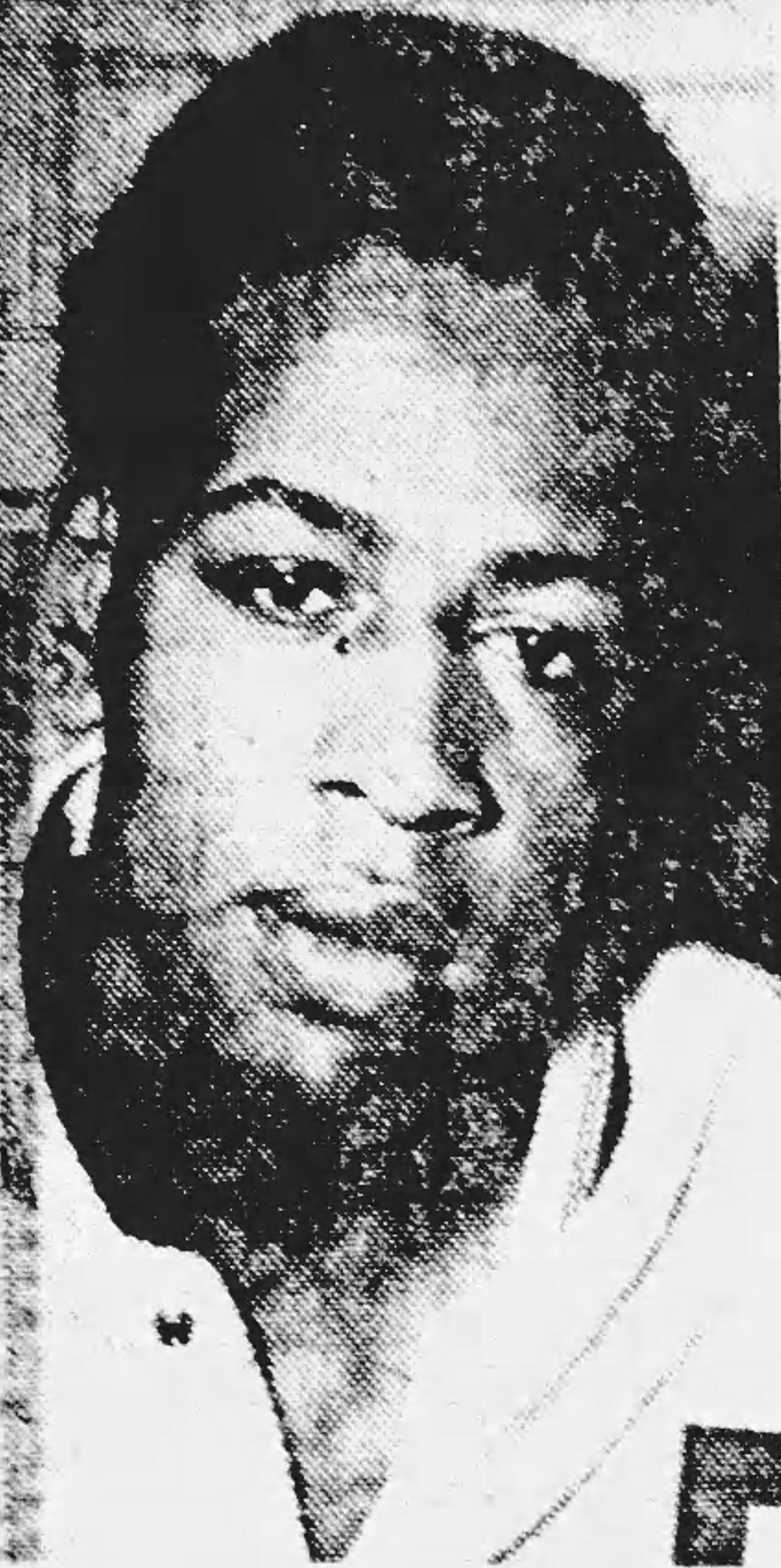
- Manor in 1977

No. 66, 75, 69
- Position: Defensive lineman

Personal information
- Born: August 10, 1952; Bridgeton, New Jersey, U.S.
- Died: June 20, 2023 (aged 70); North Little Rock, Arkansas, U.S.
- Listed height: 6 ft 4 in (1.93 m)
- Listed weight: 248 lb (112 kg)

Career information
- High school: Bridgeton
- College: Pratt CC (1971–1972); Arkansas (1973–1974)
- NFL draft: 1975: 15th round, 380th overall pick

Career history
- New York Jets (1975)*; Denver Broncos (1976–1984); Tampa Bay Buccaneers (1984); Denver Broncos (1984–1985)
- * Offseason or practice squad member only

Career NFL statistics
- Games played: 113
- Games started: 35
- Sacks: 23
- Stats at Pro Football Reference

Brison A. Manor Jr. (August 10, 1952 – June 20, 2023) was an American professional football player who was a defensive end for eight seasons in the National Football League (NFL), primarily with the Denver Broncos. He played college football at Pratt Community College and Arkansas and was selected by the New York Jets in the 15th round (380th overall) of the 1975 NFL draft. After failing to make the Jets, Manor was a member of the Broncos from 1976 to 1985, splitting 1984 between them and the Tampa Bay Buccaneers.

== Early life and education ==
Manor was born on August 10, 1952, and grew up in Bridgeton, New Jersey. He was a standout football player at Bridgeton High School and began his college football career at Pratt Community College in Kansas. Prior to attending college, Manor had never set foot outside of his home state. He played for Pratt from 1971 to 1972, earning junior college All-America honors before accepting a scholarship to play with the Arkansas Razorbacks. Working with coach Jimmy Johnson at Arkansas, Manor recorded 173 tackles during his junior and senior years.

== Professional career ==
Manor was selected in the 15th round (380th overall) of the 1975 NFL draft by the New York Jets. He was one of their final roster cuts. Afterwards, he received a call to play for the Ottawa Rough Riders of the Canadian Football League (CFL), but by the time he arrived, they said they no longer needed him. He ended up spending the year as a car salesman.

Manor was signed by the Denver Broncos in 1976 and made the team, but was sidelined for the year by a knee injury in the final preseason game. He made the roster in 1977 and played in 13 regular season games, helping the Broncos reach Super Bowl XII where they lost to the Dallas Cowboys. Manor played every game for the Broncos in 1978 and became a full-time starter the following season, having his best performance in 1979 when he made 6.5 sacks and a fumble recovery. He was a member of Denver until 1984, appearing in 102 games for the team by that time while posting 22 sacks.

The Tampa Bay Buccaneers traded a future draft choice for Manor prior to the 1984 season. He appeared in six games as a reserve, posting one sack, before being released by the Buccaneers, after which he was re-signed by the Broncos and finished the season with them. He spent the 1985 season on injured reserve and did not play afterwards. Manor finished his career with 113 games played, 35 as a starter, with 23 sacks, one interception, and three fumble recoveries.

== Later life and death ==
Manor later became an investment broker in Little Rock, Arkansas. He was inducted into the University of Arkansas Sports Hall of Honor in 2011 and was part of the Arkansas Sports Hall of Fame class of 2018. He died in North Little Rock, Arkansas, on June 20, 2023, at age 70.
