= Glenn Hyde =

American football player (born 1951)

No. 65, 60, 52
- Position: Tackle / Guard / Center

Personal information
- Born: March 14, 1951 (age 75); Boston, Massachusetts, U.S.
- Listed height: 6 ft 3 in (1.91 m)
- Listed weight: 253 lb (115 kg)

Career information
- High school: Lexington (Lexington, Massachusetts)
- College: Pittsburgh
- NFL draft: 1974: undrafted

Career history
- Atlanta Falcons (1974)*; Denver Broncos (1976–1981); Baltimore Colts (1982); Denver Broncos (1984–1985); Seattle Seahawks (1986); Kansas City Chiefs (1987)
- * Offseason or practice squad member only

Career NFL statistics
- Games played: 115
- Games started: 13
- Fumble recoveries: 1
- Stats at Pro Football Reference

Glenn Thatcher Hyde (born March 14, 1951) is an American former professional football player who was an offensive tackle for 10 seasons in the National Football League (NFL), primarily with the Denver Broncos. Nicknamed "Lumpy", he played college football for the Pittsburgh Panthers. He also played professionally in the World Football League (WFL) for the Chicago Fire and the Charlotte Hornets, and in the United States Football League (USFL) for the Denver Gold and the Chicago Blitz.
