= Claudie Minor =

American football player (born 1951)

No. 71
- Position: Offensive tackle

Personal information
- Born: April 21, 1951 (age 75); Pomona, California, U.S.
- Listed height: 6 ft 4 in (1.93 m)
- Listed weight: 280 lb (127 kg)

Career information
- High school: Garey (Pomona, California)
- College: San Diego State
- NFL draft: 1974: 3rd round, 68th overall pick

Career history
- Denver Broncos (1974–1982)

Awards and highlights
- PFWA All-Rookie Team (1974); Second-team All-Coast (1973)

Career NFL statistics
- Games played: 125
- Games started: 123
- Stats at Pro Football Reference

Claudie Dee Minor, Jr. (born April 21, 1951) is an American former football player. He was a offensive tackle in the National Football League (NFL) who played nine seasons for the Denver Broncos from 1974 to 1982. He started in 98 consecutive games until 1980 when he missed a start due to injury. He played both as a left back and right tackle, and was part of the Broncos team that went to Super Bowl XII.
