= Jon Keyworth =

American football player (born 1950)

No. 32
- Position: Running back

Personal information
- Born: December 15, 1950 (age 75); San Diego, California, U.S.
- Listed height: 6 ft 3 in (1.91 m)
- Listed weight: 230 lb (104 kg)

Career information
- High school: Chaffey (Ontario, California)
- College: Colorado
- NFL draft: 1974: 6th round, 144th overall pick

Career history
- Denver Broncos (1974–1980)

Career NFL statistics
- Rushing attempts: 699
- Rushing yards: 2,653
- Rushing TDs: 22
- Stats at Pro Football Reference

Jonathan Kimball Keyworth (born December 15, 1950) is an American former professional football player who was spent his entire seven-year career as running back for the Denver Broncos of the National Football League (NFL) from 1974 to 1980. He played college football for the Colorado Buffaloes and was selected in the sixth round of the 1974 NFL draft. He also had a musical career and released an album, Keys. He graduated from Chaffey High School in Ontario, California.

== NFL career statistics ==
Legend
**Bold**	Career high

=== Regular season ===
Year	Team	Games		Rushing					Receiving				
Year	Team	GP	GS	Att	Yds	Avg	Lng	TD	Rec	Yds	Avg	Lng	TD
1974	DEN	14	5	81	374	**4.6**	30	**10**	12	109	**9.1**	18	0
1975	DEN	14	14	**182**	**725**	4.0	**34**	3	**42**	**314**	7.5	19	**1**
1976	DEN	14	13	122	349	2.9	13	3	22	201	**9.1**	**31**	**1**
1977	DEN	11	9	83	311	3.7	16	1	11	48	4.4	14	0
1978	DEN	16	16	112	444	4.0	30	3	21	166	7.9	20	**1**
1979	DEN	16	9	81	323	4.0	17	1	18	132	7.3	18	0
1980	DEN	10	3	38	127	3.3	14	1	15	87	5.8	22	0
		95	69	699	2,653	3.8	34	22	141	1,057	7.5	31	3

=== Postseason ===
Year	Team	Games		Rushing					Receiving				
Year	Team	GP	GS	Att	Yds	Avg	Lng	TD	Rec	Yds	Avg	Lng	TD
1977	DEN	3	3	**18**	**48**	**2.7**	**7**	**1**	**1**	**3**	**3.0**	**3**	0
1978	DEN	1	1	6	12	2.0	5	0	0	0	0.0	0	0
1979	DEN	1	1	0	0	0.0	0	0	0	0	0.0	0	0
		5	5	24	60	2.5	7	1	1	3	3.0	3	0
