= Rich Baska =

American football player (born 1952)

No. 54
- Position: Linebacker

Personal information
- Born: February 19, 1952 (age 74); Bismarck, North Dakota, U.S.
- Listed height: 6 ft 3 in (1.91 m)
- Listed weight: 225 lb (102 kg)

Career information
- High school: Carson
- College: UCLA
- NFL draft: 1974: undrafted

Career history
- Los Angeles Rams (1974)*; The Hawaiians (1975); Denver Broncos (1976–1977)
- * Offseason or practice squad member only
- Stats at Pro Football Reference

Richard Paul Baska (born February 19, 1952) is an American former professional football player who was a linebacker for the Denver Broncos of National Football League (NFL). He played college football for the UCLA Bruins. He also played for The Hawaiians in the World Football League (WFL).
