= Norris Weese =

American football player (1951–1995)

No. 14
- Position: Quarterback

Personal information
- Born: August 12, 1951; Baton Rouge, Louisiana, U.S.
- Died: January 20, 1995 (aged 43); Englewood, Colorado, U.S.
- Listed height: 6 ft 1 in (1.85 m)
- Listed weight: 195 lb (88 kg)

Career information
- High school: Chalmette (LA)
- College: Ole Miss
- NFL draft: 1974: 4th round, 99th overall pick

Career history
- The Hawaiians (1974); Denver Broncos (1974–1979)

Career NFL statistics
- Passing attempts: 251
- Passing completions: 143
- Completion percentage: 57.0%
- TD–INT: 7–14
- Passing yards: 1,887
- Passer rating: 66.9
- Rushing yards: 362
- Rushing touchdowns: 5
- Stats at Pro Football Reference

Norris Lee Weese (August 12, 1951 – January 20, 1995) was a professional American football quarterback. He was a star quarterback for Chalmette High School and the University of Mississippi. He had the unenviable task of succeeding Mississippi quarterback legend Archie Manning, but performed well in the key position.

Recalling the November 4, 1972 game in Baton Rouge in which Ole Miss lost to Louisiana State University, 17–16, because of a unique touchdown catch from quarterback Bert Jones to LSU running back Brad Davis, Weese said Tiger Stadium "just exploded with thousands of fans jumping high in the night air." Until that point the Rebels had outplayed LSU all night long.

Weese played the 1974 season for The Hawaiians in the World Football League before joining the NFL. He spent four seasons in the NFL playing for the Denver Broncos (1976–1979), mostly as a backup quarterback.

In Super Bowl XII against the Dallas Cowboys, where his famed high school head coach Bobby Nuss held the chains, Weese replaced starter Craig Morton in the third quarter after Morton nearly threw his 5th interception. Weese led the Broncos to a touchdown on the drive to cut his team's deficit to 20–10, but he lost a fumble in the fourth quarter, setting up a Dallas touchdown that put the game away. He was known for being a mobile QB.

Weese was named starting quarterback for the Broncos in 1979, but a knee injury that year ended his NFL career. He finished his career with 1887 passing yards, seven touchdowns and fourteen interceptions.

Weese went on to become a certified public accountant in Denver, Colorado.

Norris Weese died on January 20, 1995, of bone cancer.

To this day, Weese holds the record for most single game rushing yards as a quarterback in Broncos history, rushing for 120 yards on 12 carries against the Chicago Bears on December 12, 1976.
