= Chris Pane =

American football player (born 1953)

No. 23
- Position: Safety

Personal information
- Born: May 19, 1953 (age 73); Berkeley, California, U.S.
- Listed height: 5 ft 11 in (1.80 m)
- Listed weight: 184 lb (83 kg)

Career information
- High school: Livermore (Livermore, California)
- College: Chico State
- NFL draft: 1975: undrafted

Career history
- The Hawaiians (1975); Denver Broncos (1976–1979)

Career NFL statistics
- Games played: 36
- Stats at Pro Football Reference

Christopher Albert Pane (born May 19, 1953) is an American former professional football player who was a safety for the Denver Broncos of the National Football League (NFL). He played college football for the Chico State Wildcats.
