= Steve Foley (defensive back) =

American football player (born 1953)

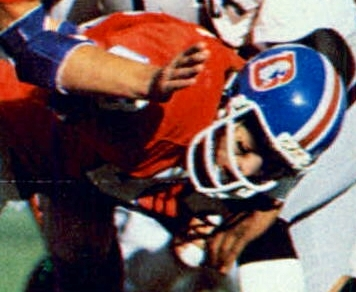
- Foley playing for the Denver Broncos in the 1977 AFC Championship Game

No. 43
- Position: Safety / Cornerback

Personal information
- Born: November 11, 1953 (age 72); New Orleans, Louisiana, U.S.
- Listed height: 6 ft 2 in (1.88 m)
- Listed weight: 189 lb (86 kg)

Career information
- High school: Jesuit (New Orleans)
- College: Tulane
- NFL draft: 1975: 8th round, 199th overall pick

Career history
- Jacksonville Express (1975); Denver Broncos (1976–1986)

Awards and highlights
- All-Pro (1978); Denver Broncos Ring of Fame

Career NFL statistics
- Games played: 150
- Interceptions: 44
- Interception yards: 622
- Touchdowns: 2
- Stats at Pro Football Reference

Stephen James Foley (born November 11, 1953) is an American former professional football player who was a safety in the National Football League (NFL). He played his entire 11-year NFL career (1976–1986) with the Denver Broncos after one year (1975) with the Jacksonville Express of the World Football League (WFL).

As a member of the Orange Crush Defense, Foley played in the Super Bowl twice. He was a starter in Super Bowl XII against the Dallas Cowboys and played in Super Bowl XXI (his final game) against the New York Giants. The Broncos lost both of these games.

Foley scored two touchdowns in his career, both of which came in 1984. He returned a fumble 22 yards on October 15 against the Green Bay Packers and an interception 40 yards on December 15 against the Seattle Seahawks. These scores were key contributions to Broncos' victories. As of 2017, his 44 career interceptions remains a franchise record.

Foley began his career as a quarterback, playing high school football at Jesuit High School of New Orleans and collegiately at Tulane University, before successfully converting to defensive back.

Foley's daughter, Natalie, was a gymnast at Stanford University from 2003 to 2006.

Foley was inducted into the Broncos' Ring of Fame in 2024.
