= Louis Wright (American football) =

American football player (born 1953)

No. 20
- Position: Cornerback

Personal information
- Born: January 31, 1953 (age 73); Gilmer, Texas, U.S.
- Listed height: 6 ft 2 in (1.88 m)
- Listed weight: 200 lb (91 kg)

Career information
- High school: Bakersfield (CA)
- College: San Jose State
- NFL draft: 1975: 1st round, 17th overall pick

Career history
- Denver Broncos (1975–1986)

Awards and highlights
- 4× First-team All-Pro (1978, 1979, 1983, 1984); Second-team All-Pro (1977); 5× Pro Bowl (1977–1979, 1983, 1985); NFL 1970s All-Decade Team; PFWA All-Rookie Team (1975); Denver Broncos Ring of Fame; Denver Broncos 50th Anniversary Team; Second-team All-American (1974); First-team All-Pac-8 (1974)

Career NFL statistics
- Games played: 166
- Interceptions: 26
- Interception yards: 360
- Touchdowns: 1
- Stats at Pro Football Reference

Louis Donnel Wright (born January 31, 1953) is an American former professional football player who was a cornerback in the National Football League (NFL), spending his entire 12-year career with the Denver Broncos from 1975 to 1986. He was a five time Pro Bowler in 1977 to 1979, 1983 and 1985.

== College career ==
Wright began his college career at Arizona State University but would later transfer to San José State. He started at cornerback in each of his two years at San José State, finishing his career there with 3 interceptions. He also excelled in track and field, winning two letters. His accomplishments included recording a long jump distance of 25 feet, 7 inches that still ranks in the top five in school history and running the 100 in 9.6 seconds. Following his senior year, Wright played in the 1974 East-West Shrine Game and the 1974 Senior Bowl. He was later inducted into the San José State University Hall of Fame.

== NFL career ==
“They use a term today of shutdown cornerback." "We didn't have that term back then, but Louie Wright was a shutdown cornerback. He was a great run defender. He played the left side and in those days most teams were right-handed and their running plays usually went to our left side.”
Joe Collier

Wright was drafted by the Broncos in the first round with the 17th overall pick in the 1975 NFL draft. He broke into the lineup quickly, starting 11 games as a rookie and intercepting two passes while also recovering a fumble.

1977 would be his breakout season as he intercepted 3 passes for 128 yards and a touchdown and helped lead the Broncos to Super Bowl XII. He was named a First-team All-Pro by the Associated Press in both 1978 and 1979. During the '79 season, he returned a fumble 82 yards for a touchdown. In 1980 and 1981, he was named Second-team All-Conference by UPI. In addition to his cover skills, Wright was also one of the best run supporting cornerbacks of his era. His feats eventually earned him the nickname "Lou-dini."

Arguably, Wright had the best season of his career in 1983, intercepting a career-high 6 passes and being named First-team All-Pro by Newspaper Enterprise Association. In 1984, he recorded the second fumble return for a touchdown of his career and was named First-Team All-Pro by Pro Football Weekly and The Sporting News.

In 1985, he intercepted 5 passes and was named First-team All-Conference by UPI. In a week 11 game against the San Diego Chargers, Wright recorded the fourth and final touchdown of his career, returning a blocked field goal 60 yards for the winning score in overtime of the 30-24 Broncos victory. 1986 would be Wright's final season in the NFL and he intercepted 3 passes in helping lead the Broncos to Super Bowl XXI.

In his NFL career, he finished with 26 interceptions for 360 yards and 1 touchdown. He also recovered 11 fumbles and returned two for touchdowns. He was inducted to the Denver Broncos Ring of Fame in 1993. He was name to the National Football League 1970s All-Decade Team but he is one of only four defensive players on the list to not be inducted into the Pro Football Hall of Fame.

The Professional Football Researchers Association named Wright to the PRFA Hall of Very Good Class of 2016.

== Coaching career ==
Wright is now a teacher and assistant football coach at Gateway High School in Aurora, Colorado.
