= Lonnie Perrin =

American football player (1952–2021)

No. 35, 33, 25
- Position: Running back

Personal information
- Born: February 3, 1952; Norfolk, Virginia, U.S.
- Died: January 7, 2021 (aged 68); Clinton, Maryland, U.S.
- Listed height: 6 ft 1 in (1.85 m)
- Listed weight: 222 lb (101 kg)

Career information
- High school: McKinley (Washington, D.C.)
- College: Illinois
- NFL draft: 1976: 5th round, 139th overall pick

Career history
- Denver Broncos (1976–1978); Chicago Bears (1979); Washington Redskins (1979)

Awards and highlights
- Second-team All-Big Ten (1975)

Career NFL statistics
- Rushing attempts: 262
- Rushing yards: 1,047
- Rushing TDs: 9
- Stats at Pro Football Reference

Lonnie Perrin (February 3, 1952 – January 7, 2021) was an American football running back in the National Football League (NFL) for the Denver Broncos, the Chicago Bears, and the Washington Redskins. He played college football at the University of Illinois and was drafted in the fifth round of the 1976 NFL draft. He played in Super Bowl XII with the Broncos.

Perrin died on January 7, 2021, in Clinton, Maryland, at age 68.
