= Paul Howard (American football) =

American football player (1950–2020)

No. 60
- Position: Guard

Personal information
- Born: September 12, 1950; San Jose, California, U.S.
- Died: December 5, 2020 (aged 70); Denver, Colorado, U.S.
- Listed height: 6 ft 3 in (1.91 m)
- Listed weight: 260 lb (118 kg)

Career information
- College: BYU
- NFL draft: 1973: 3rd round, 54th overall pick

Career history
- Denver Broncos (1973–1986)

Career NFL statistics
- Games played: 187
- Games started: 147
- Stats at Pro Football Reference

Paul Eugene Howard (September 12, 1950 – December 5, 2020) was an American football player who played guard in the National Football League (NFL) for the Denver Broncos. Howard graduated from Central Valley High School and played college football at BYU.
