= Tom Glassic =

American football player (born 1954)

No. 62
- Position: Guard

Personal information
- Born: April 17, 1954 (age 72); Elizabeth, New Jersey, U.S.
- Listed height: 6 ft 3 in (1.91 m)
- Listed weight: 254 lb (115 kg)

Career information
- High school: Watchung Hills Regional (Warren, New Jersey)
- College: Virginia
- NFL draft: 1976: 1st round, 15th overall pick

Career history
- Denver Broncos (1976–1983)

Awards and highlights
- PFWA All-Rookie Team (1976); First-team All-ACC (1975)

Career NFL statistics
- Games played: 105
- Games started: 92
- Stats at Pro Football Reference

Tom Glassic (born April 17, 1954) is an American former professional football player who was a guard for the Denver Broncos of the National Football League (NFL). He was drafted in the first round with the 15th overall pick in the 1976 NFL Draft.

He attended Watchung Hills Regional High School in Warren, New Jersey.
