= Jack Dolbin =

American football player (1948–2019)

No. 82
- Position: Wide receiver

Personal information
- Born: October 12, 1948; Pottsville, Pennsylvania, U.S.
- Died: August 1, 2019 (aged 70); Allentown, Pennsylvania, U.S.
- Listed height: 5 ft 10 in (1.78 m)
- Listed weight: 180 lb (82 kg)

Career information
- College: Wake Forest

Career history
- 1970;: Pottstown Firebirds (ACFL)
- 1971: Schuylkill County Coal Crackers (SFL)
- 1974: Chicago Fire (WFL)
- 1975–1979: Denver Broncos
- Stats at Pro Football Reference

John Tice Dolbin Jr. (October 12, 1948 – August 1, 2019) was an American professional football player who was a wide receiver for five seasons with the Denver Broncos of the National Football League. He started for the Broncos in Super Bowl XII and played in 62 consecutive games for the Broncos during his five-season tenure with the team. He is considered one of the most successful players that surged from the World Football League. Before his WFL career he played for the minor league Pottstown Firebirds of the Atlantic Coast Football League and Schuylkill County Coal Crackers of the Seaboard Football League.
