= Bob Swenson =

American football player (born 1953)

No. 51
- Position: Linebacker

Personal information
- Born: July 1, 1953 (age 73); Stockton, California, U.S.
- Listed height: 6 ft 3 in (1.91 m)
- Listed weight: 225 lb (102 kg)

Career information
- High school: Tracy (Tracy, California)
- College: California
- NFL draft: 1975: undrafted

Career history
- Denver Broncos (1975–1983)

Awards and highlights
- First-team All-Pro (1981); Pro Bowl (1981); Second-team All-Pac-8 (1973)

Career NFL statistics
- Sacks: 7.5
- Fumble recoveries: 9
- Interceptions: 11
- Defensive TDs: 1
- Stats at Pro Football Reference

Robert Charles Swenson (born July 1, 1953) is an American former professional football player who was a linebacker for the Denver Broncos of the National Football League (NFL). He played college football for the California Golden Bears. He joined the NFL in 1975 as an undrafted free agent and played the Broncos. Commenting on the draft for Sports Illustrated in 1978, Swenson said that "The draft is bull,... The scouts for most of the teams are 100 years old, and most of them don't know what they're doing. I went to school at Berkeley, and most of the NFL scouts think the students are still rioting in the streets out there. They didn't want to look at me."

Swenson's career spanned eight seasons, from 1975 through 1983, though he missed the 1980 season due to an injury. He was part of the famed Orange Crush Defense that propelled the Broncos to Super Bowl XII in January 1978, at the end of the 1977 season. He was elected to the Pro Bowl after the 1981 season.
