= Rubin Carter (American football) =

American football player and coach (born 1952)

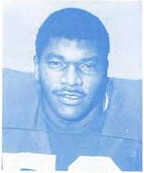
- Carter in 1974

Biographical details
- Born: December 12, 1952 (age 73); Pompano Beach, Florida, U.S.

Playing career
- 1971–1974: Miami (FL)
- 1975–1986: Denver Broncos
- Position: Defensive tackle

Coaching career (HC unless noted)
- 1987–1993: Howard (DL)
- 1994–1995: Miami Killian High School (DL)
- 1995–1996: San Jose State (DL)
- 1997–1998: Maryland (DL)
- 1999–2000: Washington Redskins (DL)
- 2001–2003: New York Jets (DL)
- 2004–2005: Temple (DL)
- 2005–2007: Florida A&M
- 2009–2011: New Mexico (DL)
- 2012: Towson (DL)
- 2013–2015: Purdue (DL)

Head coaching record
- Overall: 16–17

Accomplishments and honors

Awards
- Consensus All-American (1974)

Rubin Carter (born December 12, 1952) is an American former football player and coach. He last served as defensive line coach for Purdue University. Carter played professionally as a defensive tackle in the National Football League (NFL) with the Denver Broncos from 1975 to 1986. Carter was the head coach of the Florida A&M Rattlers football team from 2005 to 2007. Carter has been the defensive line coach at the University of New Mexico under head coach Mike Locksley. Carter graduated from Fort Lauderdale's Stranahan High School in 1971. Carter was inducted into the University of Miami Sports Hall of Fame in 1992. He is the father of Andre Carter.

== Coaching career ==
=== Florida A&M ===
In July 2005, Carter replaced Billy Joe to become the new head coach at Florida A&M University. In the 2005 and 2006 seasons, Carter compiled 6–5 and 7–4 records, respectively. After compiling a 3–8 record in the 2007 season, Florida A&M fired Carter, citing that the university needed to "move in a new direction".

=== Purdue ===
On December 5 2013, Carter was hired as the defensive line coach for the Purdue Boilermakers football team. On November 29, 2015, Carter's contract was not renewed by Purdue.

== Head coaching record ==
Year	Team	Overall	Conference	Standing	Bowl/playoffs
Florida A&M Rattlers (Mid-Eastern Athletic Conference) (2005–2007)
2005	Florida A&M	6–5	5–3	4th	
2006	Florida A&M	7–4	5–4	4th	
2007	Florida A&M	3–8	2–7	9th	
Florida A&M:		16–17	12–14		
Total:		16–17			
