= Bill Thompson (American football) =

American football player (born 1946)

Billy Thompson
No. 36
- Position: Defensive back

Personal information
- Born: October 10, 1946 (age 80); Greenville, South Carolina, U.S.
- Listed height: 6 ft 1 in (1.85 m)
- Listed weight: 201 lb (91 kg)

Career information
- High school: Sterling (Greenville)
- College: Maryland State
- NFL draft: 1969: 3rd round, 61st overall pick

Career history
- Denver Broncos (1969–1981)

Awards and highlights
- First-team All-Pro (1977); Second-team All-Pro (1979); Second-team All-AFL (1969); 3× Pro Bowl (1977, 1978, 1981); Denver Broncos Ring of Fame

Career NFL/AFL statistics
- Interceptions: 40
- Fumble recoveries: 21
- Touchdowns: 7
- Kick/punt return yards: 2,970
- Stats at Pro Football Reference

William Allen Thompson (born October 10, 1946) is an American former professional football player who was a cornerback and safety in the National Football League (NFL). Selected by the Denver Broncos in the third round of the 1969 NFL/AFL draft, he played college football at Maryland State College and was inducted into the Hawk Hall of Fame in 1984. Thompson was a three-time Pro Bowl selection and was inducted into the Broncos Ring of Fame in 1987.

== Professional career ==
Thompson played his entire 13-year career for the Denver Broncos from 1969 to 1981. During his career he was selected to the three Pro Bowls in 1977, 1978, and 1981 and was an All-Pro selection in 1977. He is currently third on the Broncos all-time list for games started with 179, tenth in games played with 179, and holds the club record for interception return yards at 784.

== See also ==
- Most consecutive starts by a strong safety
