= WSDP =

Coordinates: 42.3495°N 83.4958°W

- Plymouth, Michigan; United States
- Frequency: 88.1 MHz
- Branding: 88.1 The Park

Programming
- Format: Adult contemporary

Ownership
- Owner: Plymouth-Canton Schools

History
- First air date: February 14, 1972
- Call sign meaning: School District of Plymouth

Technical information
- Licensing authority: FCC
- Facility ID: 52840
- Class: A
- ERP: 300 watts
- HAAT: 16 meters

Links
- Public license information: Public file; LMS
- Webcast: Listen Live
- Website: 881thepark.com

WSDP is the student-operated radio station owned by the Plymouth-Canton Educational Park in Canton, Michigan. The station positions itself as 88.1 The Park. WSDP is operated out of Salem High School and has been in operation since February 14, 1972. The station's current manager is Bill Keith (1991–present).

On December 31, 2011, at noon, after stunting for several days with songs or song lyrics with the word "change" in them, such as Sheryl Crow's A Change Would Do You Good and The Georgia Satellites' Keep Your Hands to Yourself (which opens with the lyric "I got a little change in my pocket, going jing-a-ling-a-ling") with announcers promoting that "change is good" and to listen at the promised time, WSDP switched its format from alternative rock as 88.1 The Escape to adult contemporary as "The New 88.1, Plymouth and Canton's Hit Music," with a playlist of pop and rock hits spanning the 1970s through today. The station also announced a contest to name the new station, in which the winner would receive a $100 gas card. The name eventually became "88.1 The Park". The first song on The New 88.1 was I Gotta Feeling by The Black Eyed Peas.

The former "88.1 The Escape" specialized in playing independent alternative rock artists not played on any mainstream commercial station in the area. Special programs heard on WSDP showcased classic rock, heavy metal, electronica, jazz, blues, contemporary Christian and other musical genres. One highlight of the WSDP schedule was "Static Age", a punk/psychobilly show that featured local bands from the Ann Arbor/Detroit, MI Area.

In 2014, 88.1 The Park was honored by the Michigan Association of Broadcasters Foundation and took home the High School Station of the Year award. It has also since 2014 up until present day, been nominated for a Marconi award for Non-Commercial Station of the Year by the NAB.

The station continues to serve the Plymouth-Canton area with local news and information and high school sports broadcasts.

== History ==
WSDP began as a dream of Plymouth High School English teacher Bonny Dore and principal Bill Brown in 1969, as preparations began to replace Plymouth with Salem High School. The station broadcast at 89.3 FM from its 1972 sign-on until October 1977, when a frequency swap with Eastern Michigan University's WEMU, which had been at 88.1, saw WSDP taking over 88.1 and WEMU moving to the 89.1 spot on the dial, where it remains to this day. The station commenced Stereo broadcasts in 1985.

Former WSDP staff members can keep tabs with the station at http://www.myspace.com/wsdpalumni

== Station managers ==
There have been only six station managers in the 38-year history of WSDP. Four of them were graduates of the Plymouth Canton school system and the last three were graduates of the WSDP program.
1972-73 Bonny Dore
1973-74 Mary Phyl Godfrey
1974-82 Jeffrey Cardinal
1982-87 Andy Melin
1987-91 David Snyder
1991–Present Bill Keith
