= Plymouth High School (Michigan) =

High school in Michigan, United States

Coordinates: 42°20′48.52″N 83°29′55.88″W

- 8400 Beck Rd. Canton, Michigan 48187; United States

Information
- Type: Public secondary
- Established: 2002
- School district: Plymouth-Canton Community Schools
- Staff: 96.75 (FTE)
- Grades: 9–12
- Enrollment: 1,816 (2024–2025)
- Student to teacher ratio: 18.77
- Colors: Black and silver
- Mascot: Wildcats
- Accreditation: NCA
- Website: https://www.pccsk12.com/schools/high-schools

Student assessments
- 2021–22 school year Change vs. prior year

M-STEP 11th grade proficiency rates (Science / Social Studies)
- Advanced %: 30.7 / 21.9
- Proficient %: 32.6 / 33.6
- PR. Proficient %: 14.9 / 37.6
- Not Proficient %: 21.8 / 6.9

Average test scores
- SAT Total: 1091.1 (▼ −36.8)

Plymouth High School is a public high school in Canton Township, Michigan, United States. Plymouth High School is located on a campus of the Plymouth-Canton Educational Park in Wayne County.

== History ==
The original Plymouth High School was built in the early 20th century on the northwest corner of Main Street and Church Street, opposite from present-day City Hall in present-day downtown Plymouth, Michigan. The district deemed the facility to be outdated by the 1960s for high school use. The facility was closed after the 1969-1970 school year. While the facility was officially closed as a high school, it remained open for high school football, basketball and swimming for the 1971 school year. The new sports facilities at PCEP were completed in time for the 1972 school year. The last official high school event at the old high school was the Class of '72 homecoming football game in October 1971. It was also the last year the homecoming parade was held in downtown Plymouth. The Senior Class of 1972 insisted on continuing the old tradition of the downtown parade leading to the old high school for the final homecoming game. In addition, the Senior Class of 1972 was the last official graduating class of the original Plymouth High. The school then became Plymouth-Salem and Plymouth-Canton in 1973. The new Plymouth High at PCEP opened in 2002.

When the first new high school opened in the present-day Plymouth-Canton Educational Park, the original Plymouth High School was converted into a middle school, dubbed Central Middle School (in conjunction with the more recently constructed East and West Middle Schools). Central Middle School remains a landmark in downtown and closed as a middle school after the 2014-2015 school year. When Plymouth opened it only let in Freshmen, and the next year Freshmen and Sophomores, etc.

Originally planned to simply remain Plymouth High School, the school's name was changed to Plymouth-Salem High School after Canton opened. Although the school district serves much of rural Salem Township, Salem residents were not necessarily exclusive to Plymouth-Salem.

Plymouth High's colors of blue and white, were retained by Plymouth Salem, and the eventual Canton High School teams taking the red with white. Opened in August 2002, and constructed southwest of Salem High School, the new Plymouth High School was designed by the architecture firm French Associates. The students selected to be Plymouth High's first senior class, the Class of 2006, were polled to come up with a new nickname for the school. Their selection, the Predators (after the Nashville Predators of the National Hockey League), was met with opposition from some parents who associated it with sexual predators. As a result, the school decided to use the generic "Wildcats" nickname, while still using the saber-toothed tiger logo of the Nashville Predators. Plymouth's school colors were to be purple and white (a combo of the red and blue of Salem and Canton), but were changed to black and silver. In addition to the formal online school resources, the school's parents, coaches and boosters proudly and voluntarily contribute content related to their group and team activities .

Plymouth-Salem retained their "Rocks" mascot; supposedly named in conjunction with the school's original identity (The Plymouth "Rocks"), or because of the large unmovable boulder that sits outside the school. It is tradition for students to spray paint this rock for school events and to celebrate important sports victories. The rock was moved during the renovations in 2008.

== Campus ==
The campus is 305 acres (1.2 km²), although much of this is athletic fields. Students may have classes in all three academic buildings, even though each student is assigned to one "home school" from which he or she is to graduate from and play sports. Students are permitted 10 minutes passing time to walk among their classes. State Law, however, does require that passage between buildings be halted in the event of lightning. There is one soccer and football field at Plymouth, as well as a band complex.

== Sports ==
Tennis Plymouth High School boys' tennis team won their first divisional championship in 2009-10, and the second divisional championship in 2011-2012. They have been division champs for the last 5 years (2011-2016).

Men's Golf Qualified for the State Finals the last 4 years (2010-2013) finishing 7th, 10th, 8th, and 2nd. Were also KLAA South division champions the last 4 years. In 2012 the men's team won its first regional championship and completed this feat again in 2013. The past two years the team has had two members receive all state recognition. Three graduates are currently playing at the collegiate level (one at NAIA and two at the Division 1 level).

Volleyball The volleyball team was first to win the division.

Boys Track & Field The boys track and field team joined the volleyball team in being the first to win the division.

Football In 2005, their first year of having a full graduating class, the Plymouth football team made the state playoffs, losing their first ever playoff game. The team again made the playoffs in 2007 and 2008, again losing their first games in the Pre-District round. The Wildcats made the playoffs again in 2010; yet, this time they not only won their first game, but they went on to beat Canton, Detroit Catholic Central, and Rockford on their way to the Division 1 State Final where they lost to Lake Orion 21-13.

Pompon The Plymouth pom team has been a staple of the school since its opening. The team is both a competitive team, as well as a performance/entertainment team during many other sporting events halftime. Competitively Plymouth Pom has had many accolades at the JV and Varsity level. Varsity earned Plymouth High Schools first ever state runner up title in February 2010. They were again state runner up in 2014. They have landed in the Final/Top 4 for the state in 2009, 2011, 2013, 2015, & 2016.

Girls Soccer The 2010 Girls Soccer team won their first MHSAA Regional title in 2009-2010. They went on to beat Portage Central in the state semi-finals, earning the right to play in their first State Finals game losing 2-1 in overtime on a penalty kick to Novi High School.

Boys Lacrosse Plymouth, Canton, and Salem high school Boys Lacrosse previously competed under the unified team the "PCS Warriors," however they have recently split up into individual teams.

Plymouth-Canton-Salem Unified Teams

PCEP Debate Team The team has grown tremendously in the past two years, and is now placing in the top two places for the Wayne-Oakland Debate League.

PCS United Cheer In 2005, the PCS United Cheer team was formed, composed of cheerleaders from all three schools and is also a nationally ranked team.

PCS Girls Ice Hockey The Plymouth-Canton-Salem Penguins girls ice hockey team won the 2006 and 2007 State Championships.

PCEP Figure Skating The Plymouth-Canton-Salem figure skating team competes annually in district competitions as well as statewide championships. In the 2010-11 season, they came in 3rd in district competitions, and went on to tie for 4th place in the statewide competition, just 2 points behind the 3rd place team.

Lightning Robotics FIRST Robotics team number 862. This team competes at the district, state, and world levels. They have won several district competitions and recently won 1st place at the Bedford District event and also placed rank 17th at the World Championship and was also ranked 3rd at the World Championship in 2013.
