= Plymouth–Canton Educational Park =

Coordinates: 42.34852°N 83.49356°W

- Salem High School; 46181 Joy Rd; Canton, Michigan 48187 Canton High School; 8415 Canton Center Rd. Canton, Michigan 48187 Plymouth High School; 8400 Beck Rd. Canton, Michigan 48187; United States

Information
- Type: Public secondary
- Established: 1970: Salem High School; 1972: Canton High School; 1974: Phase III (Canton North); 2002: Plymouth High School
- School district: Plymouth-Canton Community Schools
- Grades: 9–12
- Colors: Red and White (Canton); Black and Silver (Plymouth); Blue and White (Salem)
- Mascot: Cobras (Canton); Wildcats (Plymouth); Rocks (Salem)
- Accreditation: NCA
- Website: https://pcep.pccsk12.com/

The Plymouth–Canton Educational Park (commonly PCEP or "The Park") encompasses three public secondary schools—Salem High School, Canton High School, and Plymouth High School—in Canton Township, Michigan, United States within Metro Detroit. PCEP is located on a 305-acre (123 ha) campus.

It is part of the Plymouth-Canton Community Schools District, serving portions of Wayne County and Washtenaw County, including City of Plymouth, Plymouth Township, and parts of Canton Township, Salem Township, Superior Township, and Northville Township.

== History ==
=== The original Plymouth High School (and later Salem High School) ===
The original Plymouth High School was built in the early 20th century on the northwest corner of Main Street and Church Street, opposite from present-day City Hall in present-day downtown Plymouth, Michigan. The district deemed the facility to be outdated by the 1960s for high school use. The facility was closed as a high school after the 1969–70 school year and used exclusively for 9th grade in 1970–71 and 1971–72.

When the first new high school opened in the present-day Plymouth-Canton Educational Park, the original Plymouth High School was converted into a middle school, dubbed Central Middle School (in conjunction with the previously constructed East and West Middle Schools). Central Middle School closed after the 2014–15 school year.

Originally planned to remain Plymouth High School, the school's name was changed to Plymouth-Salem High School after Plymouth-Canton opened. Although the school district serves much of rural Salem Township, Salem residents were not necessarily exclusive to Plymouth-Salem.

Plymouth High's colors of red, white, and blue, were split up, with Plymouth-Salem retaining blue and white, and the eventual Canton High School teams taking the red with white. Plymouth-Salem retained their "Rocks" mascot; supposedly named for the large immovable boulder that sits outside the school. The rock was moved during the renovations in 2008.

Salem is divided into two main sections, North and South. The north side contains the Charles E. Olson Natatourium, the Gloria Logan Auditorium, and a two-level gymnasium on the south side, divided by a wide central hallway leading to the east entrance of the school. A staircase leads to the second-floor corridor near the entrance to the auditorium. The west side contains three classroom floors, and the cafeteria is on the southeast side of the first floor. Administrative offices are located on the northeast side of the first two floors in the main lobby, and more offices can be found on the third floor Sky Lobby. The center of the second floor is dominated by the school library and also features the studio for radio station WSDP. Stairwells on the north and south sides, referred to as the North Tower and South Tower, respectively, provide access to all three floors, and an elevator provides access for students unable to use the stairs.

In the early 1990s, the North Mall was revamped, while the South Mall was eliminated in favor of an expanded cafeteria. The school underwent renovations from 2006 to 2008 and went through renovations for more office space in 2011.

In 2002, with the opening of the new Plymouth High School as part of the PCEP, "Plymouth" was dropped from Salem and Canton's name. Individually the high schools are known as Salem High School, Canton High School and Plymouth High School.

=== Plymouth High School ===
Opened in August 2002 and constructed southwest of Salem High School, the new Plymouth High School was designed by the architecture firm French Associates. The students selected to be Plymouth High's first senior class, the Class of 2006, were polled during their 6th grade year to come up with the school's colors and mascot. Their selection, the Predators (after the Nashville Predators of the National Hockey League), was met with opposition from some parents who associated it with sexual predators. As a result, the school decided to use the generic "Wildcats" nickname, while still using the saber-toothed tiger logo of the Nashville Predators. Plymouth's school colors were to be purple and white (a combination of the red and blue of Salem and Canton), but they were changed to black and silver.

== Campus ==
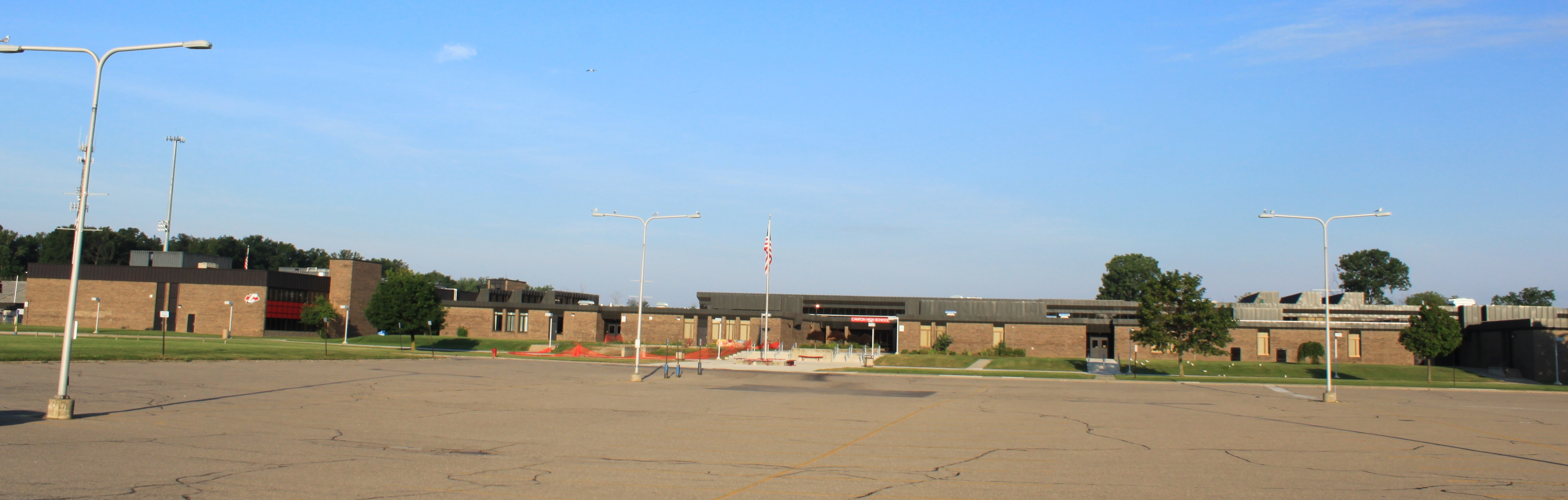
Canton High School

The campus covers 309 acres, much of which encompasses athletic fields. Students can have classes in all three academic buildings. One advantage to the 3-in-1 idea is reduced cost: there is only one auto shop (at Canton), one culinary arts facility (at Salem), two darkrooms for photography (one at Salem, one at Canton), one varsity football field (at Canton), three swimming pools (at Salem, Canton, and Plymouth), three soccer and football fields (at Canton, Salem, and Plymouth), one Robotics Shop (at Canton), one choir complex (at Salem) one orchestra complex (at Canton), and one band complex (at Plymouth).

For most of its history, the campus has contained Canton High School and Salem High School, with a great rivalry built between the two neighbors. For many years the campus operated under block scheduling, seen as an innovative way to allow for longer periods of uninterrupted teaching time. After many years, The Park resorted back to a traditional schedule with 6 classes per day and 2 semesters of classes per year.

Prior to the summer of 2006, the Cady family barn was also a part of the campus. It has since been moved to the Canton Township Cherry Hill village area next to a historic home. The Cady family barn burned down at this new location on May 30, 2021. Included on the campus grounds is also a small strip of forest that backs a nearby neighborhood. Various trails are scattered throughout the wooded area. An Artesian well can be found in the wooded area, and is visited by earth science and ecology classes yearly. A creek that is part of the Rouge River watershed runs through the campus.

== Extracurricular activities ==
PCEP's radio station, WSDP 88.1FM The Park, has won awards, including the Michigan Association of Broadcaster's annual 'Station of the Year' prize, which it has won nearly every year in the past decade. The station was started in 1972 at 89.3FM.

P-CEP also has a digital student-run newspaper, The Perspective. Since 2022, it has operated as both an extracurricular club as well as a class. Articles published by The Perspective have received awards, both from 'Best of Sno' and the MIPA School of Journalism at Michigan State University.

P-CEP's FRC Robotics team, Lightning Robotics, has won numerous awards as well. The team has won the FRC world Championship in 2017 and reaches the world and consistently places in the top 100 teams in the world each year.

== Performing arts ==
The theatrical side of the performing arts program at the park consists of two groups: The Park Players, based at Salem High School, and The Second Stage Players, based at Canton High School.

The performing arts program began with the formation of what is now the Park Players in 1970 by a drama teacher at Salem. The first three productions were staged at Central Middle School. The first production staged in Salem Auditorium was Fiddler on the Roof in 1971; as a tradition, a revival of Fiddler has been staged on the 10th and 20th anniversary years of the auditorium (1981 and 1991), while the most recent revival was staged in 2000, the 30th anniversary of the Parkstage two fully produced, faculty-directed In the 09-10 school year, Second Stage Players produced two mainstage productions, The 25th Annual Putnam County Spelling Bee in the fall, and The Complete Works of William Shakespeare (Abridged) in the spring.

The Park Players have staged over 85 productions, including Neil Simon's Proposals, Brighton Beach Memoirs, Footloose, Hello, Dolly!, Jekyll & Hyde, and Smokey Joe's Cafe. During the 2009–10 school year, the Park Players celebrated their 14th anniversary. They performed three stage productions: Noises Off as their fall play, Sweet Charity as their spring musical, and Check Please/Check Please: Take Two as an in-between production.

The Park also has a Spoken Word Club and a Puppetry Club.

=== Marching band ===
The Plymouth-Canton Marching Band is part of a broader fine arts program offered in the Plymouth-Canton Community Schools. Its Wind Ensemble, Chamber Winds, and Symphony bands have consistently rated among the best in the state of Michigan. PCEP band students and alumni have performed with the Detroit Symphony Orchestra, the Detroit Civic Youth Orchestra, the Michigan Youth Band, the National Honor Band of America, and the MSBOA All State Honor Band and Orchestra.

=== Orchestra ===
There are two orchestra classes. The lower orchestra is called Concert Orchestra, while the upper one is called Symphony Orchestra. The Symphony Orchestra incorporates members of the band program to create a true full orchestra while the Concert Orchestra only incorporates strings (violin, viola, cello, and bass).

== Curricular Choirs ==
There are seven curricular choir classes at PCEP: Park Singers, Bravo!, Allegro!, Dulcissima, Encore!, Chamber Choir, and Madrigal Singers, and Festival Singers. Festival Singers is the name for the combined group composed of the members of Chamber Choir and the Madrigal Singers, which is not considered to be a curricular choir.

=== Park Singers ===
Park Singers is an entry level, SSA choral group into which soprano and alto voices are placed by default. This group has the opportunity to participate in MSVMA activities.

=== Bravo! ===
Bravo! is an entry-level TB choral group into which tenor and bass voices are placed by default. This group has the opportunity to participate in MSVMA activities.

=== Allegro! ===
Allegro! is an intermediate SSA choral group that aims to teach intermediate level sight reading and choral techniques to its members. This group has the opportunity to participate in MSVMA activities.

=== Dulcissima ===
Dulcissima is an intermediate-advanced SSAA choral group that aims to teach intermediate-advanced level sight reading and choral techniques to its members. This group has the opportunity to participate in MSVMA activities.

=== Encore! ===
Encore! is an advanced SATB choral group singing jazz, Broadway, and popular music. This group has the opportunity to participate in MSVMA activities.

=== Chamber Choir and Madrigal Singers ===
Chamber Choir and Madrigal Singers are the highest level of curricular choir at Plymouth Canton Educational Park. They function as the ambassadors of PCEP Choirs to the community.

== Notable alumni ==
- Andrew Bazzi (Canton, 2014) - Singer-Songwriter, music producer
- David Burtka (Salem, 1993) - actor
- Tom Davey (Salem, 1991) - Major League Baseball pitcher
- Rajiv Dhall (Canton, 2010) - Singer-songwriter, multi-instrumentalist and part-time actor
- Margaret Dunning (Plymouth, 1929) - Philanthropist; attended Plymouth High School before PCEP existed
- Ron Egloff (Salem, 1973) - Former NFL tight end
- Dena Head (Salem, 1988) - First player ever drafted in the WNBA
- Ken Krolicki - (Canton, 2014) MLS soccer player
- Brandi Love (Salem, 1991) - Adult Film Star
- Alex Nedeljkovic (Plymouth, 2014) - National Hockey League Goalie
- Laura Packard (Canton, 1994) - Health care activist, spoke at 2020 Democratic National Convention
- Brandi Rhodes (2001) - Professional Wrestler
- Allison Schmitt (Canton, 2008) - U.S.A. Swimmer, 2008, 2012, 2016, 2020 Olympic medalist
- Tyler Seguin - (Plymouth, 2010) NHL hockey player
- Jason Stollsteimer (Canton, 1996) - musician
- Devin Thomas (Canton, 2004) - former NFL Wide receiver
- Lisa Turner (Salem, 2000) - Casting Director
- James Wisniewski (Canton, 2002) - Anaheim Ducks NHL defenseman
- Michael Jordan (offensive lineman) (Plymouth, 2016) - NFL offensive lineman
- Kristy Pagan (Salem, 2000) - State Representative Michigan 21st District
- Trevor Nowaske (Salem, 2017) - NFL linebacker
- Darius Robinson (Canton, 2019) - NFL defensive end
- Jack Hughes (Plymouth, 2019) -NHL hockey player
- Trevor Zegras (Plymouth, 2019) - NHL hockey player
- Cole Caufield (Plymouth, 2019) - NHL hockey player
- Matt Boldy (Plymouth, 2019) - NHL hockey player
- Tom Wilson (Plymouth, 2010) - NHL hockey player
