= Devin Thomas =

American football player (born 1986)

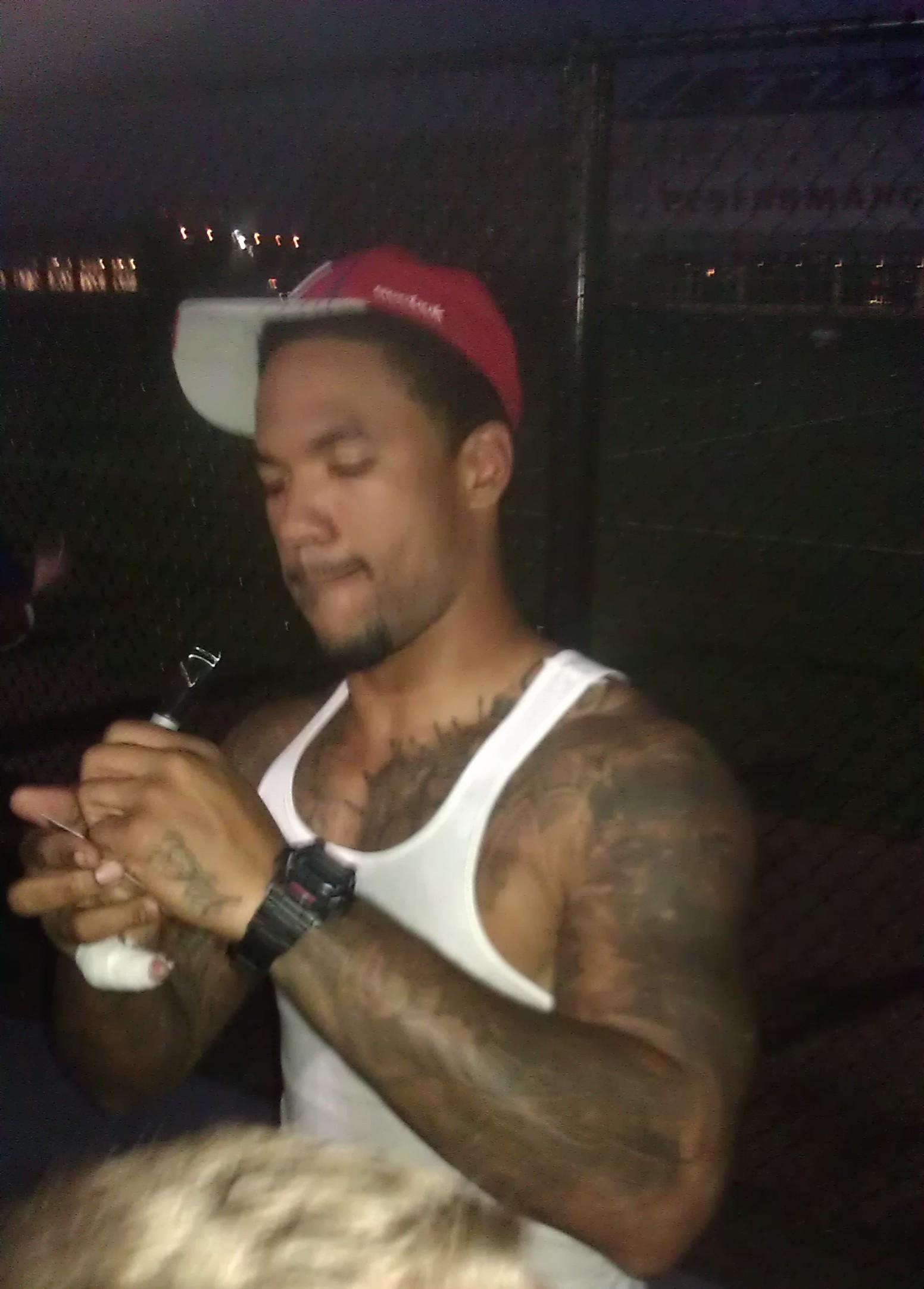
- Thomas in 2011

No. 11, 80, 81, 15
- Position: Wide receiver

Personal information
- Born: November 15, 1986 (age 40); Ann Arbor, Michigan, U.S.
- Listed height: 6 ft 2 in (1.88 m)
- Listed weight: 221 lb (100 kg)

Career information
- High school: Canton (MI)
- College: Coffeyville (2004-2005); Michigan State (2006-2007)
- NFL draft: 2008: 2nd round, 34th overall pick

Career history
- Washington Redskins (2008−2010); Carolina Panthers (2010); New York Giants (2010−2011); Chicago Bears (2012)*; Detroit Lions (2013)*
- * Offseason or practice squad member only

Awards and highlights
- Super Bowl champion (XLVI); Second-team All-Big Ten (2007); Second-team All-KJCCC (2005)

Career NFL statistics
- Receptions: 43
- Receiving yards: 482
- Receiving touchdowns: 3
- Stats at Pro Football Reference

Devin Thomas (born November 15, 1986) is an American former professional football player who was a wide receiver in the National Football League (NFL). After playing college football for the Michigan State Spartans, he was selected by the Washington Redskins in the second round of the 2008 NFL draft. He played for the Redskins from 2008 to 2010, the Carolina Panthers in 2010, and the New York Giants from 2010 to 2011. He was a member of the 2011-2012 Giants team that won Super Bowl XLVI, beating Tom Brady and the New England Patriots.

== Early life ==
Thomas attended and played high school football for Canton High School in Canton, Michigan. As a senior, he played WR, RB and CB, for Division 1 (Class A) Canton High School. He was named All-State after rushing and receiving for over 1,000 yards and 23 touchdowns and also had seven interceptions all in his senior year.

== College career ==
Thomas attended Coffeyville Community College, where he redshirted in 2004 and played as a freshman in 2005. As a sophomore at Michigan State he had only six catches. However, he blocked a punt as a key play in the teams comeback from 35 points against Northwestern. Under head coach Mark Dantonio, Thomas played well his junior year with 79 catches, a school record, for 1,260 yards, and eight touchdowns. Thomas decided to forgo his senior year at Michigan State and declare himself eligible for the 2008 draft.

== Professional career ==
=== Washington Redskins ===
Thomas was selected by the Washington Redskins in the second round (34th overall) of the 2008 NFL draft. On July 18, he agreed to a four-year 4.8 million contract that included roughly $2.7 million in guaranteed money. Thomas is represented by Drew Rosenhaus. In 2008, Thomas won the NFL Rookie Madden Bowl, defeating future Bears teammate Matt Forte.

The Redskins utilized Thomas a good deal on special teams, mainly on kickoffs. While his playing time on offense grew from 2008 to 2009, his production was limited. In 2008, he amassed 173 yards of total offense and one touchdown (rushing). In 2009, his production marginally improved to 323 yards and three touchdowns (all receiving), with a career game December 6, 2009, against the New Orleans Saints of more than 100 yards receiving and two touchdowns. Through four games in 2010, under new head coach Mike Shanahan, Thomas amassed no offensive statistics, though he continued to play on special teams.

Thomas was waived by the Redskins on October 9, 2010.

=== Carolina Panthers ===
Thomas was claimed off waivers by the Carolina Panthers on October 11, 2010, then waived again on November 23, 2010. With the Panthers for five games, Thomas played only in their 37-13 home loss on November 21, 2010, to the Baltimore Ravens and recorded no statistics.

"Things are so positive around here and we're really pushing to go for these playoffs. I never really had that before. Things have always been dismal and just like a grey cloud in D.C."

— Thomas on the difference between New York & Washington

=== New York Giants ===
On November 24, 2010, Thomas was claimed off waivers by the New York Giants. To make roster room for Thomas, the Giants placed fullback Madison Hedgecock on injured reserve with a hamstring injury. Thomas wore #8 in his first game as a Giant versus Jacksonville because the Giants have no more numbers available. During the team's December 5, 2010, game against the Redskins, Thomas made his first impact as a Giant. On special teams, Thomas had two tackles, including one at the Redskins' 20-yard line, and he blocked a Hunter Smith punt in the fourth quarter, giving the Giants the ball on the Redskins 13-yard line. On January 22, 2012, Thomas made a huge impact in the NFC Championship Game against the San Francisco 49ers, as he recovered two pivotal fumbles, one of which occurred in overtime to set up the winning score that took the Giants to Super Bowl XLVI.

=== Chicago Bears and retirement ===
On March 28, 2012, Thomas signed with the Chicago Bears to a one-year contract. On August 5, 2012, he announced his retirement from the NFL on his Twitter account. It was later revealed in the New York Daily News that same day he retired at such a young age to avoid lifelong injuries such as brain damage. He also said he would prefer to settle down with his fiancée Porshia and their son Devin Jr.

=== Detroit Lions ===
On January 17, 2013, Thomas came out of his brief retirement and signed a deal with the Detroit Lions. He was released by the Lions on August 5, 2013.
