= Margaret Dunning =

American businesswoman (1910–2015)

- Dunning stands next to the Plymouth Historical Museum exhibit named for her. The mannequin represents Margaret when she was 30.
- Born: Margaret Isabel Dunning; June 26, 1910; Redford, Michigan, U.S.
- Died: May 17, 2015 (aged 104); Santa Barbara, California, U.S.
- Education: University of Michigan

Margaret Isabel Dunning (June 26, 1910 – May 17, 2015) was an American businesswoman and philanthropist and benefactor of the Plymouth (Michigan) Historical Museum. She was born in Redford, Michigan.

== Personal life ==
Dunning was the daughter of Charles Dunning and Elizabeth (Bessie) Rattenbury. Margaret spent her first 13 years on a dairy and potato farm owned by her father, located at the corner of Plymouth and Telegraph roads in Redford Township, Michigan. The 156-acre (63 ha) farm had been purchased by her grandparents, who were original settlers in the area. When Charles died in 1923, Margaret and her mother, Bessie, moved into Redford and later to the village of Plymouth. Bessie purchased property in the village and built the home where Margaret resided. Margaret attended the country school where her father was a student, and was then sent to Dana Hall, a private school in Wellesley, Massachusetts. She returned to Plymouth in 1927 and graduated from Plymouth High School in 1929. She attended the University of Michigan for two years and then studied at the Hamilton Business School in Ypsilanti.

While growing up on the farm, Dunning developed a lifelong love of tinkering with old cars. She restored several old cars that she owned. In 1985, she donated a restored 1906 Ford Model N to the Gilmore Car Museum at Hickory Corners, Michigan. She also donated a 1930 Cadillac convertible to the museum. She still drove one of her cars in the annual Woodward Dream Cruise in Detroit each August up into her centenarian years.

Margaret never married, but could always be found with her lifelong friend Irene A. Walldorf. Margaret and Irene lived together up until Irene's death on August 20, 2002. Irene was 95.

At the age of 102, feeling a need to complete whatever she began in life, she applied to the University of Michigan (Ann Arbor) hoping to complete her bachelor's degree in business. Dunning was accepted, and subsequently awarded a 100% tuition scholarship, provided to her by the Fram Group (which also provided her with free car care products for the remainder of her life). She died on May 17, 2015, whilst visiting Santa Barbara, California, from injuries sustained from an accidental fall. She was 104.

== Professional career ==
In the early 1930s, Dunning briefly worked making voltage regulators at the Phoenix Mill Ford plant in Plymouth, a Ford Village Industries plant that employed only women. She worked as a bank teller and assistant cashier for the First National Bank of Plymouth between 1935 and 1940. During that time, she was among the victims of a bank robbery. The bank robber, Willard Long, was eventually caught in East St. Louis, Illinois, and extradited back to Michigan. After the First National Bank, she went to work at the Plymouth United Savings Bank for several years.

In 1947 Dunning purchased Goldstein's Apparel on Main Street in Plymouth and renamed the store Dunning's. In 1950 she moved Dunning's Department Store to Forest Avenue in downtown Plymouth, about two blocks away. She sold Dunning's in 1968 to Minerva Chaiken, and the store became known as Minerva-Dunning's.

== Volunteer and philanthropic activities ==
Dunning's largest impact on the Plymouth community has been in her volunteer and charitable endeavors that began in 1942. From 1942 to 1945 Dunning served as a volunteer in the local American Red Cross motor pool, driving a truck.

In 1947 Dunning and her mother, Bessie, purchased a property and building to house the Plymouth branch of the Wayne County Library System. Because of their generosity, the city renamed the branch the Dunning Branch. Today, the Plymouth District Library, no longer part of the Wayne County System, is housed in the Dunning-Hough Library.

Dunning served on the board of Community Federal Credit Union in Plymouth from 1962 to 1984 and was president of the board for 19 of those years. The assets of the credit union increased from $1 million and one office to $40 million and six offices during Dunning's tenure on the board. The credit union established the Margaret Dunning Scholarship Fund in 1989 in her honor for her contributions to the Plymouth community. She served on other local boards, including the Board of Directors of the Dunning Branch of the Wayne County Library.

In 1971, when the Plymouth Historical Society was looking for money to build a new museum building, Dunning stepped forward and donated in excess of US$100,000. That donation allowed for the construction of a 15,000-square-foot (1,400 m^{2}) building to house the historical artifacts of the community. In 1998, the Plymouth Historical Society purchased a sizeable collection of Abraham Lincoln memorabilia from Dr. Weldon Petz. By this time, the museum was at capacity and had nowhere to store or exhibit the new collection. Again Dunning stepped forward, this time with a $1 million donation to add an additional 9,800 square feet (910 m^{2}) to the museum building on two floors. Dunning is a permanent member of the Plymouth Historical Society's Board of Directors. In 1997 Dunning established the Margaret Dunning Foundation as a private grantmaking foundation, which also gives occasional grants to the Plymouth Historical Museum.

== Legacy ==
Dunning was in the first group of 16 individuals inducted into the Plymouth Hall of Fame, sponsored by the Plymouth Kiwanis Club, on August 11, 1980. Others inducted were some of Plymouth's founders and benefactors, including Ebenezer J. Penniman and George Anson Starkweather.

== Death ==
Dunning died on May 17, 2015, in Santa Barbara, California, United States, six weeks before her 105th birthday due to injuries sustained from an accidental fall.
