= Ron Egloff =

American football player (born 1955)

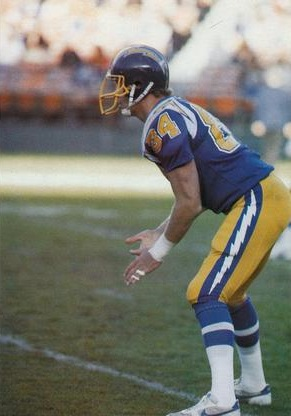
- Egloff c. 1984

No. 85, 84
- Position: Tight end

Personal information
- Born: October 3, 1955 (age 71); Garden City, Michigan, U.S.
- Listed height: 6 ft 5 in (1.96 m)
- Listed weight: 230 lb (104 kg)

Career information
- High school: Plymouth-Salem (MI)
- College: Wisconsin
- NFL draft: 1977: undrafted

Career history
- Denver Broncos (1977–1983); San Diego Chargers (1984)

Career NFL statistics
- Games played: 105
- Receptions: 75
- Receiving yards: 839
- Touchdowns: 4
- Stats at Pro Football Reference

Ronald Barry Egloff (born October 3, 1955) is an American former professional football player who was a tight end, who played eight seasons in the National Football League (NFL) for the Denver Broncos and San Diego Chargers. He played college football for the Wisconsin Badgers.

== Early life ==
Egloff attended Plymouth-Salem High School in Plymouth, Michigan, where he earned varsity letters for football and basketball from 1970 to 1973. As a junior, he caught 25 passes for 385 yards and four touchdowns, earning Detroit Free Press first-team all-suburban honors. As a senior, Egloff caught 30 passes for 458 yards on offense while averaging 15 tackles a game on defense as a linebacker, earning Detroit Free Press first-team all-suburban and second-team all-metro honors. He committed to play college football at the University of Wisconsin–Madison, signing his National Letter of Intent in April 1973.

== College career ==
Egloff had one reception as a sophomore in 1974 – a diving nine-yard touchdown catch in a 21–20 win over Nebraska. As a junior, he made eight catches for 78 yards. As a senior in 1976, Egloff was the team's second-leading receiver with 20 catches for 308 yards and four touchdowns, earning an invitation to play in the Blue–Gray Football Classic in Montgomery, Alabama.

== Professional career ==
After going unselected in the 1977 NFL draft, Egloff signed with the Denver Broncos as an undrafted free agent. In his first year, the Broncos won their first AFC Championship and went to Super Bowl XII in New Orleans against the Dallas Cowboys and lost, 27–10.

On September 12, 1984, Egloff was signed by the San Diego Chargers following a brief "retirement" by Kellen Winslow. Egloff was one of four tight ends on the roster until he was waived on October 12. He was subsequently re-signed by San Diego on October 23 following injuries to the other three tight ends. Egloff played 12 games and made 11 catches that season. He was subsequently released by the Chargers in July 1985.

== Personal life ==
Two of Egloff's brothers played college football: Randy at Yale and Dick at Arizona State. After football, Egloff was a partner in the restaurant Jackson Hole Sports Grill for twenty years. He is married to his wife Julee. They have three children: Dayton, Adam, and Elliott.
