= Plymouth Arts & Recreation Complex =

- Plymouth High School and Central Grade School
- U.S. National Register of Historic Places
- Plymouth High School, 1924
- Interactive map
- Location: 650 Church St. Plymouth, Michigan
- Coordinates: 42°22′25″N 83°28′02″W
- Built: 1917
- Architect: Rockwell A. LeRoy, Wheeler & Becker Architects, Thomas W. Moss
- Architectural style: Collegiate Gothic, Modern architecture
- NRHP reference No.: 100013409
- Added to NRHP: September 18, 2026

The Plymouth Arts & Recreation Complex is a recreation center in the former Plymouth High School, located at 650 Church Street in Plymouth, Michigan. The building was listed on the National Register of Historic Places in 2026.

== History ==
Plymouth Union District No 1 was organized in 1853, and moved into a wooden building at this location. An addition was constructed in 1855, and in 1877 high school classes began at the site. In 184, a new brick schoolhouse was constructed, with an addition in 1907. However, in 1916 a fire completely destroyed the school. The district quickly hired architect Rockwell A. LeRoy to design a new school on the site. A new bond was issued to pay for the building, and construction quickly began. The new building, housing students from kindergarten through senior high, opened in October 1917.

As population increased, a separate elementary school, known as the central Grade School, was constructed in 1924. In 1937, an addition to the Central Grade School was constructed. The high school was remodeled in 1950, and Central Grade School was repurposed to serve as a junior high. In 1959, the high school and junior high were connected to form one building. However, by the late 1960s, the building was considered outdated, and plans were formed to construct a new high school. In 1970 a new school - now Plymouth Salem High School - was constructed in the Plymouth–Canton Educational Park. The old high school was converted into the Central Middle School. However, as new schools were constructed, the old high school was more outdated, and in 2015 the school district vacated the building. The Board of Education sold the building to the Plymouth Arts & Recreation Complex, a non-profit organization.

The entire building was renovated for use as an art and recreation center. The Plymouth Arts & Recreation Complex offers athletic activities, studio spaces, workshops, and classes.

== Description ==
The Plymouth Arts & Recreation Complex consists of a number of interconnected buildings constructed between 1917 and 1965. These include the former Plymouth High School and Plymouth Central Grade School, as well as the Gymnasium and Natatorium and the Industrial and Vocational Educational Center. Also in the complex are additions and connections between the buildings and surrounding athletic fields and courts.

The original Plymouth High School is a three-story U-shaped Collegiate Gothic brick structure. The building is faced with a glazed buff-colored brick on the first floor and red brick on the upper stories. Decorative limestone is used in the facade, including crenelations at the parapet level.

The former high school is connected, via a 1959 addition, to the 1924 Central Grade School. The Grade School is a three story brick structure featuring the same glazed buff-colored brick on the first floor and red brick on the upper stories that clads the high school.
