= Plymouth–Canton Community Schools =

School district in Michigan

The Plymouth–Canton Community Schools (P-CCS) is a school district headquartered at E. J. McClendon Educational Center in Plymouth, Michigan. The district's boundary includes areas in Wayne County and Washtenaw County, including the City of Plymouth, Plymouth Township, and parts of Canton Township, Salem Township, Superior Township, and Northville Township.

== Schools ==
Designated areas of the district are assigned to various schools. Each elementary school and middle school has an attendance zone. Students are randomly assigned to high schools, regardless of their locations within the district.

=== Alternative education ===
- Starkweather Educational Center (Plymouth Township, formerly Fiegel Elementary School)
- Gallimore Elementary School (Canton Twp. TAG Magnet school)

=== High schools ===
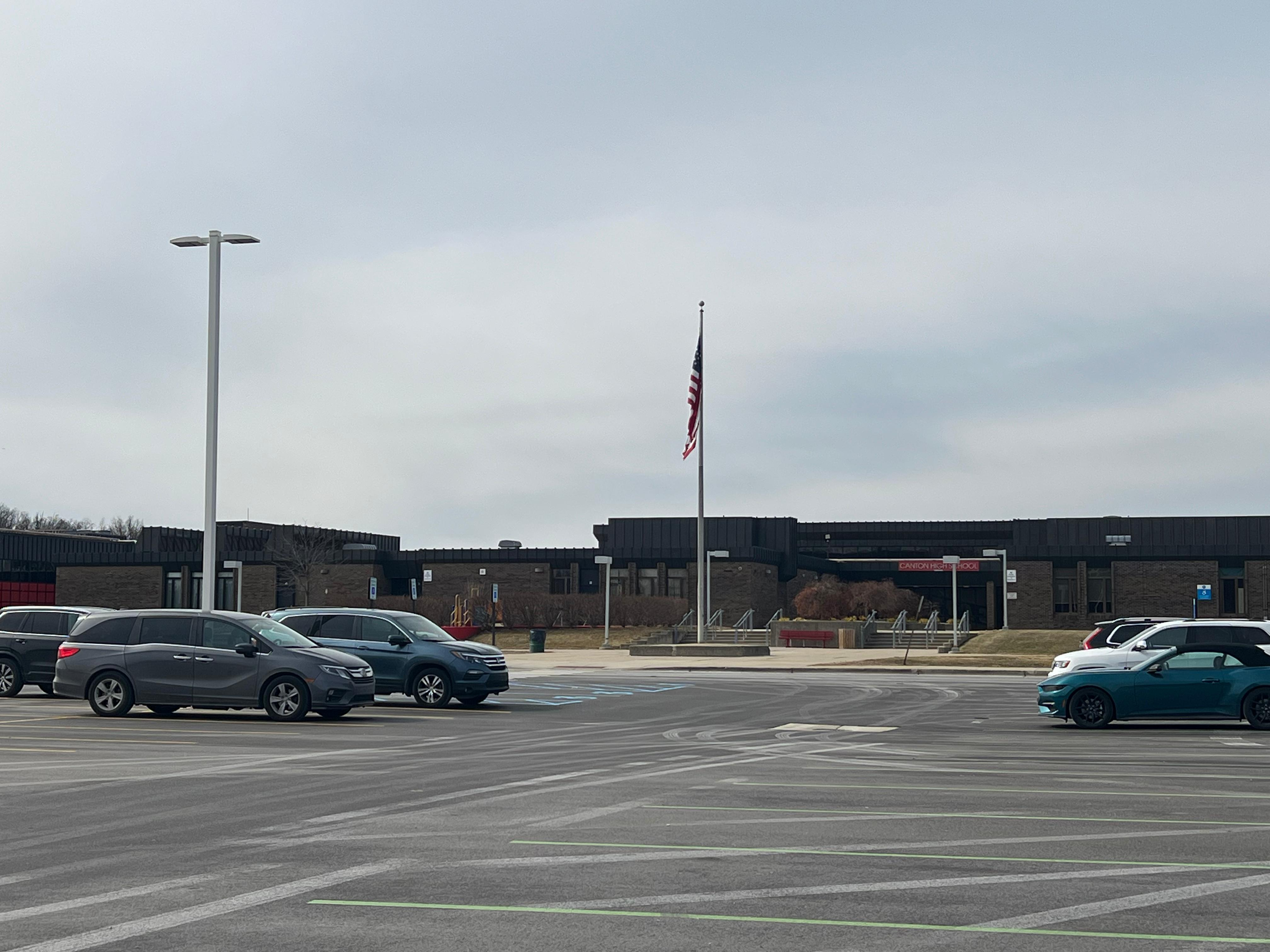
Canton High School, located within Plymouth-Canton Community Schools.

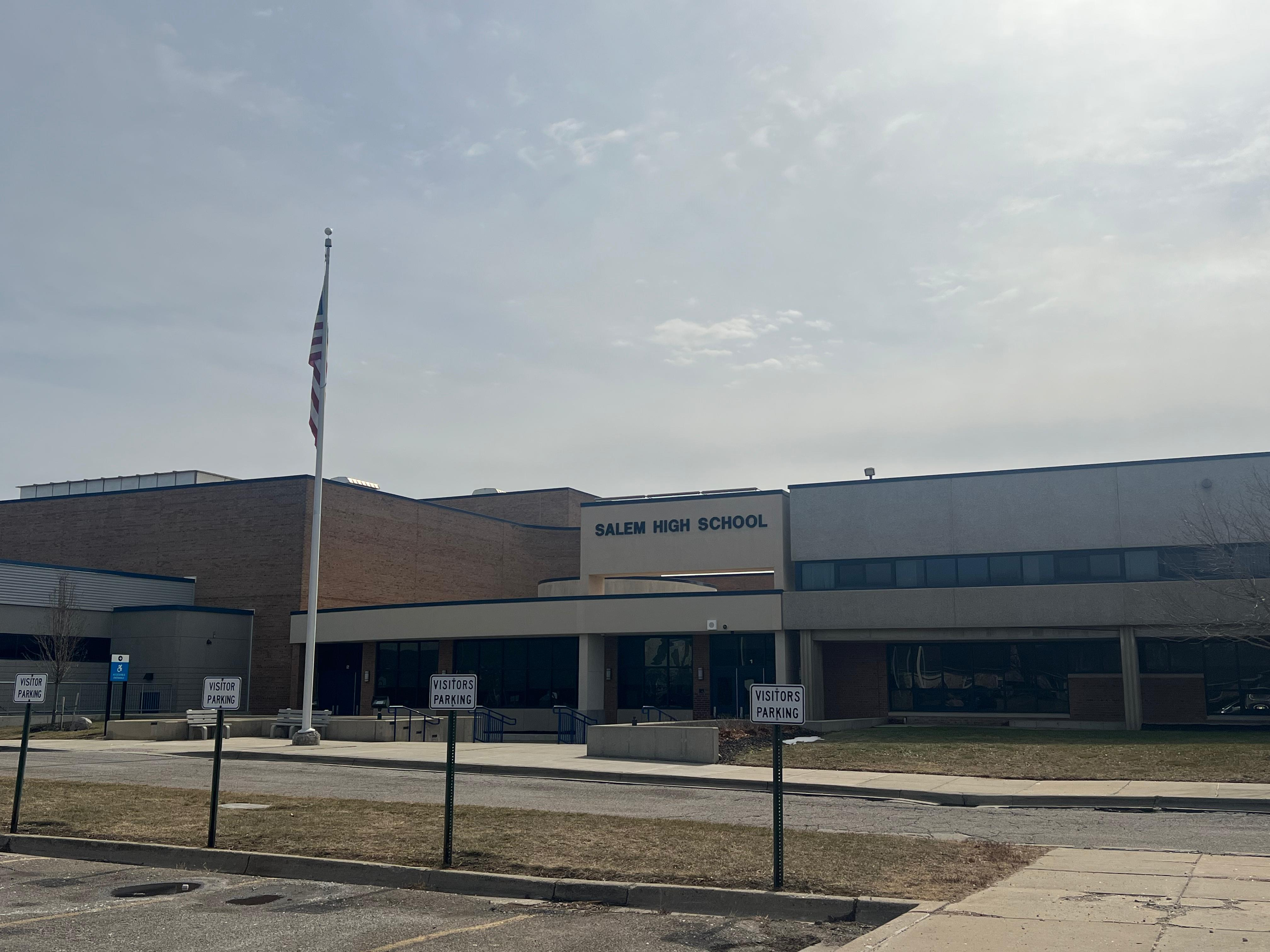
Salem High School, located within Plymouth-Canton Community Schools.

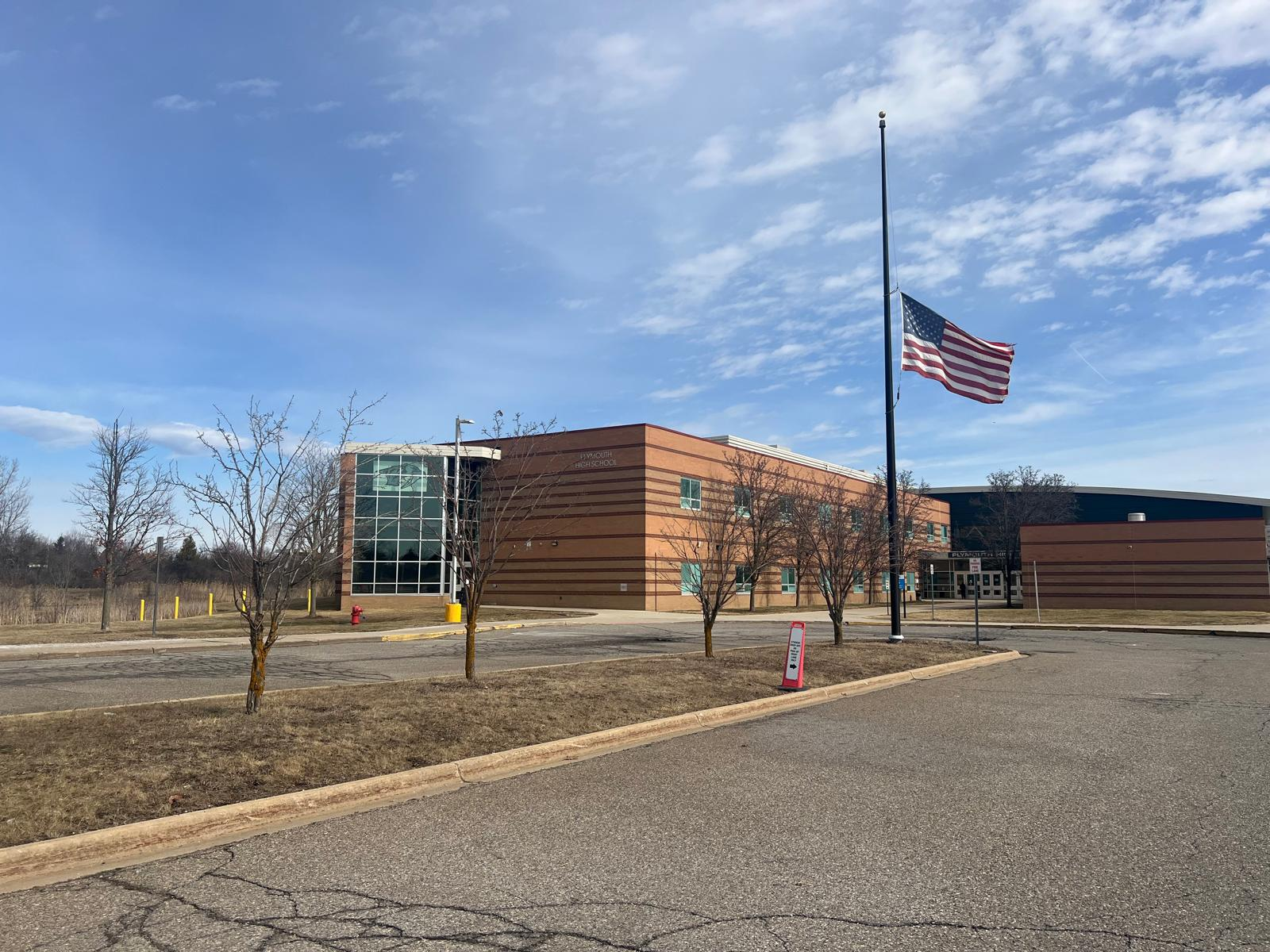
Plymouth High School, located within Plymouth-Canton Community Schools.

The district's high schools are located in the Plymouth-Canton Educational Park (P-CEP) in Canton Township.

- Canton High School (Formerly Plymouth-Canton High School)
- Plymouth High School
- Salem High School (Formerly Plymouth-Salem High School)

=== Middle schools ===
- Discovery Middle School (Canton Township)
- East Middle School (Plymouth)
- Pioneer Middle School (Plymouth Township)
- West Middle School (Plymouth Township)
- Liberty Middle School (Canton Township)

=== Elementary schools ===
- Bentley Elementary School (Canton Township)
- Bird Elementary School (Plymouth Township)
- George Dodson Elementary School (Canton Township)
- Eriksson Elementary School (Canton Township)
- Farrand Elementary School (Plymouth Township)
- Mildred Field Elementary School (Canton Township)
- Hoben Elementary School (Canton Township)
- Hulsing Elementary School (Canton Township)
- Isbister Elementary School (Plymouth Township)
- Miller Elementary School (Canton Township)
  - In July 1975 the school started a pilot year-round schooling program, allowing it to increase its student capacity by one third. The pilot was completed in August 1977.
- Smith Elementary School (Plymouth)
- Flossie B. Tonda Elementary School (Canton Township)
- Workman Elementary School (Canton Township)

=== Defunct schools ===
- Canton Center School (Canton Township) - Now the Canton Historical Society Museum.
- Cherry Hill School (Canton Township) - Now used for community events
- Hanford School (Former one room school house)
- Bartlett School (Former school house located on Canton Center near Hanford. May not have ever been part of P-CCS)
- Hough School (Canton Township) - Now a private residence.
- Sheldon School (Canton Township) - Now used for private offices.
- Lowell Middle School (Westland) - was leased from the Livonia Public Schools school district for several years. Now Johnson Upper Elementary
- Fiegel Elementary School (Plymouth Township) - Now used as Starkweather Alt. High School.
- Starkweather Elementary School (Plymouth)
- Truesdell School (Canton Township)
- Kinyon School (Former school house located on Joy Rd east of Ridge. Shown on 1942 topo map. May not have been part of P-CCS)
- Allen School (Former school house located on Ann Arbor Trail near Powell. Shown on 1936 topo map. May not have been part of P-CCS)
- Allen Elementary School - Closed in 2014
- Plymouth High School (original downtown location) Closed in 1970 and re-opened as Central middle school 1971, operated as a middle school until June 2015, The property was sold to the Malcolm's and the Plymouth Art and Recreation Complex (PARC) was formed, and now uses the building for a community space in November 2018 the PARC in a joint effort with Plymouth Township and the city of Plymouth attempted to get a millage passed to renovate and update the old Plymouth high school. The millage failed, leaving the fate of the old Plymouth high school up for debate. The Melcom‘s had originally donated the property to the community foundation, a nonprofit group which would have donated the property to the city and the township after the passing of the millage. For the millage to pass it had to pass in the Township and the city; the millage did pass in the city but not in the Township. Eventually, in January 2019 the community foundation donated the property to PARC, which is now the owner of the old Plymouth high school, and works to raise money to repair and renovate the old historical building.
- Tanger Elementary School (Northville Township)
- Tanger Center (Plymouth Township)

=== Canton High School ===
Canton High School is one of the three main high schools of P-CCS and is a part of the Plymouth-Canton Educational Park (P-CEP). Its mascot is a "Cobra", although it used to be the "Chiefs". Canton is separated into two parts, one in the north used mainly for athletic purposes and is smaller. The main part of Canton, situated to the south, is home to the STEM Program and Robotics. It is also much larger than the northern part. Its principal as of 2026 is David Reed-Nordwall. It was named after Canton Township, which it is located in and which is the largest part of the Plymouth Canton School District, with an impressive 100,000 people.

=== Plymouth High School ===
Plymouth High School is one of the three main high schools of P-CCS and is a part of the Plymouth-Canton Educational Park (P-CEP). It is situated in the Southwestern Part of the Academic Corridor, and paths lead northeast towards the Tennis Courts and Salem High School. A long path also leads through baseball fields all the way to Canton High School. Plymouth High School is home to the IB Program and is good in extracurriculars and sports. Its principal as of 2026 is Gregory Anglin. Its mascot is a "Wildcat", but was originally supposed to be a "predator", but received backlash from parents, due to obvious reasons. They have a new state-of-the-art natatorium that was created recently. It was named after Plymouth Township and City of Plymouth, which are together the second biggest part of the school district, with over 30,000 people.

=== Salem High School ===
Salem High School is one of the three main high schools of P-CCS and is a part of the Plymouth-Canton Educational Park (P-CEP). It is situated to the North of Canton and Plymouth High Schools, just south of Joy Road. It sits by the Tennis Courts, and has recently finished a multi-purpose field to its east. Its principal as of 2026 is Kim Villarosa. Salem High School has, on average, the largest number of students who get into the University of Michigan. It was named after the nearby Salem Township, which is mainly rural and does not have many people.
