= Canton, Michigan =

American township in Michigan, United States

Canton Township, Michigan
- Charter township
- Charter Township of Canton
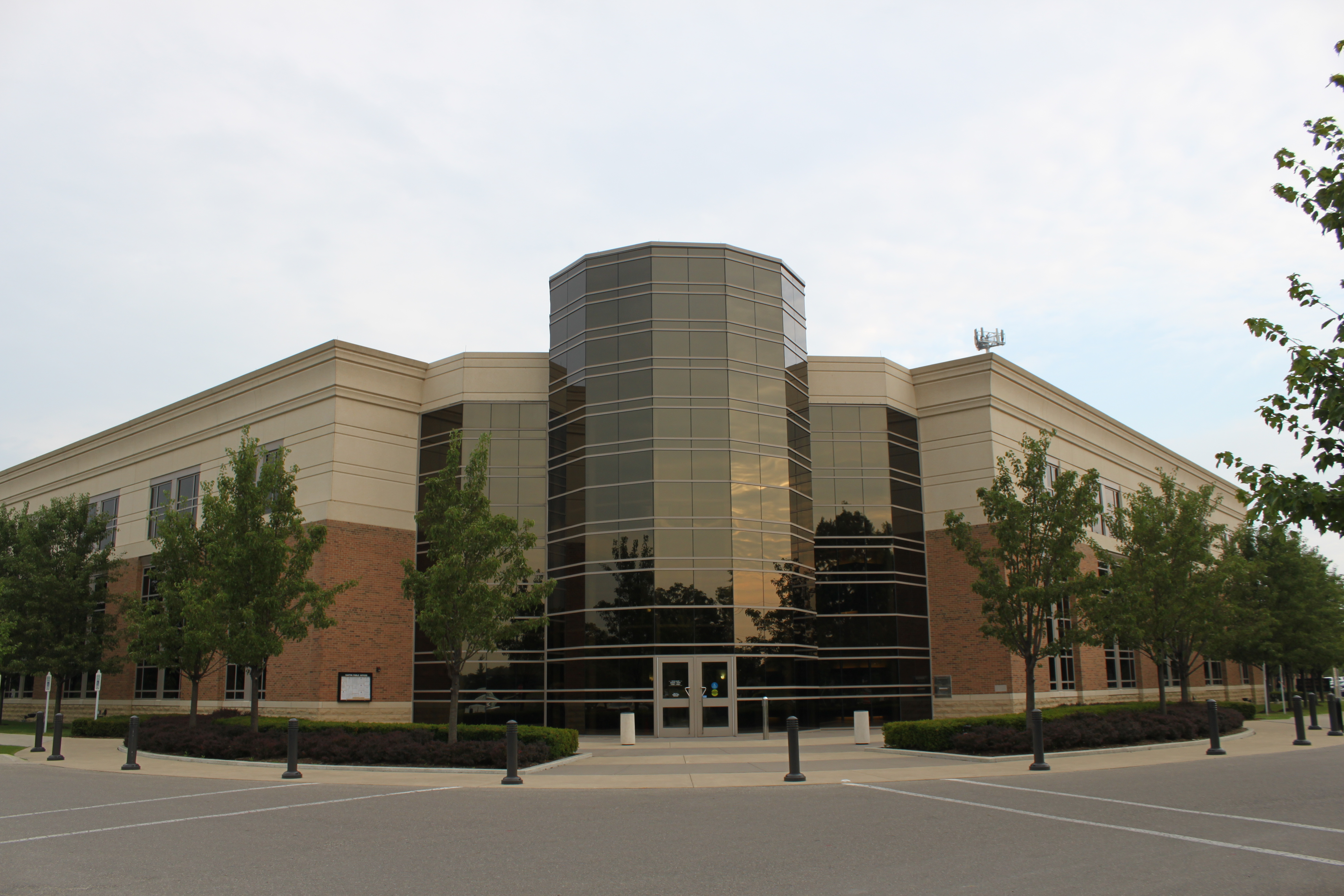
- The Canton Municipal Building in 2010
- Motto: "Michigan's Community of Vision!"
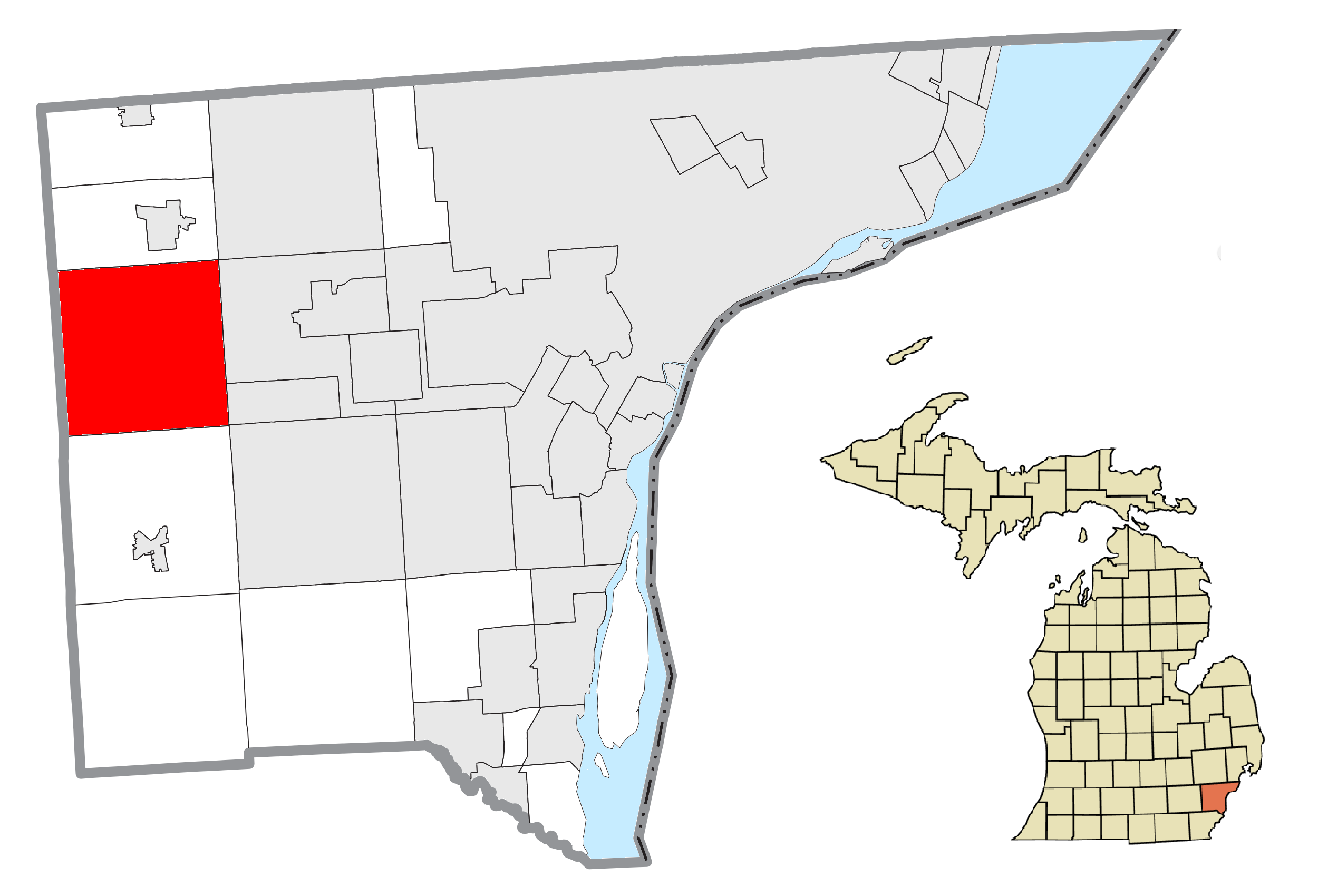
- Location within Wayne County

- Location within the state of Michigan Location within the United States
- Coordinates: 42°18′31″N 83°28′56″W
- Country: United States
- State: Michigan
- County: Wayne
- Settled: 1825
- Organized: 1834
- Named for: Guangzhou, China

Government
  - Supervisor: Anne Marie Graham-Hudak
  - Clerk: Michael Siegrist
  - Treasurer: Dian Slavens

Area
  - Charter township: 36.14 sq mi (93.6 km^{2})
  - Land: 36.11 sq mi (93.5 km^{2})
  - Water: 0.03 sq mi (0.078 km^{2})
- Elevation: 679 ft (207 m)

Population (2020)
  - Charter township: 98,659
  - Density: 2,732.2/sq mi (1,054.9/km^{2})
  - Metro: 4,285,832 (Metro Detroit)
- Time zone: UTC-5 (EST)
  - Summer (DST): UTC-4 (EDT)
- ZIP Code(s): 48187, 48188
- Area code: 734
- FIPS code: 26-13120
- GNIS feature ID: 1626030
- Website: www.cantonmi.gov

Canton Township (commonly known simply as Canton) is a charter township in Wayne County in the U.S. state of Michigan. A western suburb of Detroit, Canton is located roughly 23 miles (37.0 km) west of downtown Detroit, and 15 miles (24.1 km) east of Ann Arbor. As of the 2020 census, the township had a population of 98,659, making it Michigan's second most-populated township (after Clinton Township) and ninth most-populated municipality overall.

== Communities ==
- Canton is an unincorporated community within the township, although the name often refers to the whole township itself. It is located just south of M-153 (Ford Road) at 42°18′31″N 83°28′56″W. The Canton post office, first established in 1852, serves an area conterminous with the township itself—using the 48187 ZIP Code north of Cherry Hill Road and the 48188 ZIP Code to the south.
- Cherry Hill is an unincorporated community in the western portion of the township at 42°18′22″N 83°32′10″W. Centered along the intersection of Cherry Hill Road and Ridge Road, it is the site of a new urbanist neighborhood, as well as containing numerous original historic structures.
- Hoffman was a historic settlement located 3.0 miles (4.8 km) west of the city of Wayne within Canton Township in 1880.
- Sheldon (or Sheldon's Corners) is an unincorporated community in the southern portion of the township on U.S. Highway 12 just west of Interstate 275 at 42°16′29″N 83°28′33″W. Named after early settler Perry Sheldon, the community dates back to 1825 and predates the creation of Canton Township. That year, Timothy and Rachel Sheldon built the Sheldon Inn, which stood until it was demolished in 2021. A post office under the name Canton operated here from January 24, 1852, until it was transferred on March 17, 1857. Sheldon also contained a depot along the Michigan Central Railroad. The community itself is a designated Michigan State Historic Site and also contains the Territorial Road historic marker.

== History ==
Earlier, on October 20, 1829, the legislature had passed a bill creating the townships of Lima and Richland out of Bucklin Township. Governor Lewis Cass returned the acts unapproved, citing a conflict under the law. The names conflicted with post offices in existence, contrary to a territorial law from April 12, 1827, which prohibited incorporation of a new township bearing the same name as any existing post office. The legislature thus had to substitute the names of Nankin and Pekin after the cities of Nanjing (Nanking) and Beijing (Peking) in China. The name of Pekin was extinguished when it was renamed Redford in 1833.

The Township of Canton was created by act of the Michigan Territorial Legislature on March 7, 1834, out of a southern portion of Plymouth Township. It was named in honor of the port and provincial capital known historically as Canton, Imperial China, known today from the pinyin standard as Guangzhou.

The first meeting to organize the township was held in April 1834.

In the summer of 2002, the emerald ash borer was discovered in Canton, eventually infesting the Great Lakes region.

The Canton Historical Society and Museum opened in 1982 in a one-roomed schoolhouse.

On August 24, 2023, an EF-0 tornado hit Canton around 10:19 pm and ended at 10:21 pm. Little damage was done, with trees uprooted and pavilions toppled.

== Geography ==
According to the United States Census Bureau, the township has a total area of 36.14 square miles (93.60 km^{2}), of which 36.11 square miles (93.52 km^{2}) is land and 0.03 square miles (0.08 km^{2}) (0.08%) is water.

The south of the township is drained by the Lower River Rouge and its tributaries, including Pine Creek, which drains from the northwest corner to the southeast. The northeast is drained by Tonquish Creek and Garden Creek, which are tributaries of the Middle River Rouge.

== Economy ==
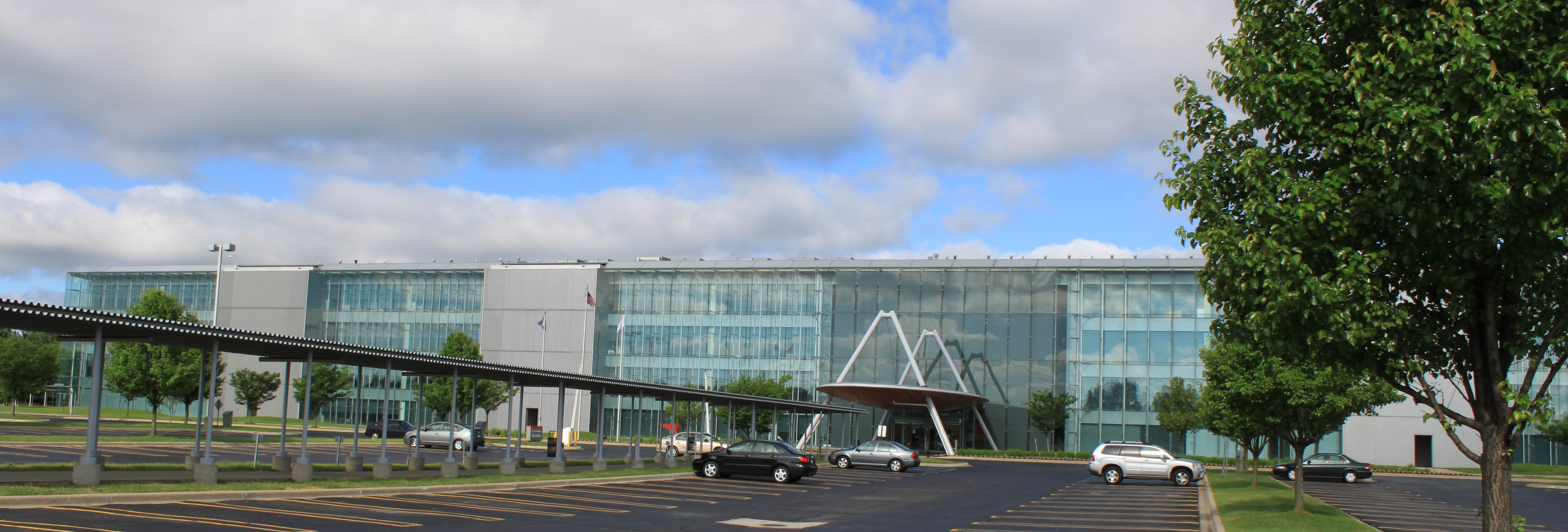
Yazaki North American Headquarters

=== Top employers ===
According to the Charter Township's 2024 Annual Comprehensive Financial Report, the top employers in the city are:

#	Employer	# of Employees
1	Plymouth-Canton Community Schools	1,993
2	Yazaki North America	1,112
3	Walmart	778
4	A. D. Transport Express	554
5	Charter Township of Canton	402
6	Sysco Detroit	373
7	The Home Depot	314
8	Target Brands	310
9	Amazon	300
10	Kroger	287

The publisher Visible Ink Press has its headquarters in Canton.

== Transportation ==
=== Major highways ===
- I-275 runs south–north near the eastern edge of the township and is accessible via Michigan Avenue (exit 22) and Ford Road (exit 25).
- US 12 (Michigan Avenue) runs east–west through the southern portion of the township.
- M-153 (Ford Road) runs east–west near the center of the township.

=== Airport ===
- Canton–Plymouth Mettetal Airport is a public use airport located in the northeast section of the township.

=== Trails ===
- I-275 Metro Trail is a bicycle trail that runs parallel to Interstate 275.

== Education ==
Canton Township is served by the Plymouth-Canton Community Schools (which serves the northern 2/3 portion of Canton), Wayne-Westland Community Schools (which serves the south-eastern portion of Canton) and Van Buren Public Schools (which serves the south-western portion of the township). P-CCS includes most of Canton Township, the city of Plymouth, Plymouth Township, and portions of Salem, Superior, and Northville Townships.

=== Schools ===
==== Wayne-Westland Community Schools ====
A portion is in Wayne-Westland Community Schools Most Wayne-Westland-zoned areas are zoned to Walker-Winter Elementary School in Canton. A small portion is zoned to Roosevelt-McGrath Elementary School in Wayne.

Some portions of the Wayne-Westland section of Canton are zoned to Stevenson Middle School in Westland, while the majority is zoned to Franklin Middle School in Wayne.

The Wayne-Westland section of Canton is split between both John Glenn High School in Westland, and Wayne Memorial High School in Wayne.

==== Plymouth-Canton Community Schools ====
A portion is in the Plymouth-Canton Community Schools. All other schools lie in other school districts.

===== Elementary Schools =====
- Bentley Elementary School
- Bird Elementary School
- Canton Charter Academy
- Dodson Elementary School
- Eriksson Elementary School
- Farrand Elementary School
- Field Elementary School
- Gallimore Elementary School **
- Hoben Elementary School
- Hulsing Elementary School
- Isbister Elementary School
- Miller Elementary School
- Smith Elementary School
- Tonda Elementary School
- Workman Elementary School

===== Middle Schools =====
- Discovery Middle School
- East Middle School **
- Liberty Middle School
- Pioneer Middle School
- West Middle School

===== High Schools =====
- Canton High School *
- Plymouth High School *
- Salem High School *
- Starkweather Center (Alternative education)

(* Part of the Plymouth-Canton Educational Park)

(** Part of Talented and Gifted (TAG) Program)

==== Public charter schools ====
- Canton Charter Academy
- Achieve Charter Academy
- South Canton Scholars Charter Academy
- Plymouth Scholars Charter Academy
- Canton Preparatory High School

==== Private schools ====
- All Saints Catholic School
- Plymouth Christian Academy
- Plymouth Canton Montessori
- Crescent Academy International
- Banyan Montessori Academy

==== Further education ====
- Michigan Institute of Aviation and Technology

== Crime ==
In 2015, Canton was ranked as the 29th most safe city in the U.S.

== Demographics ==
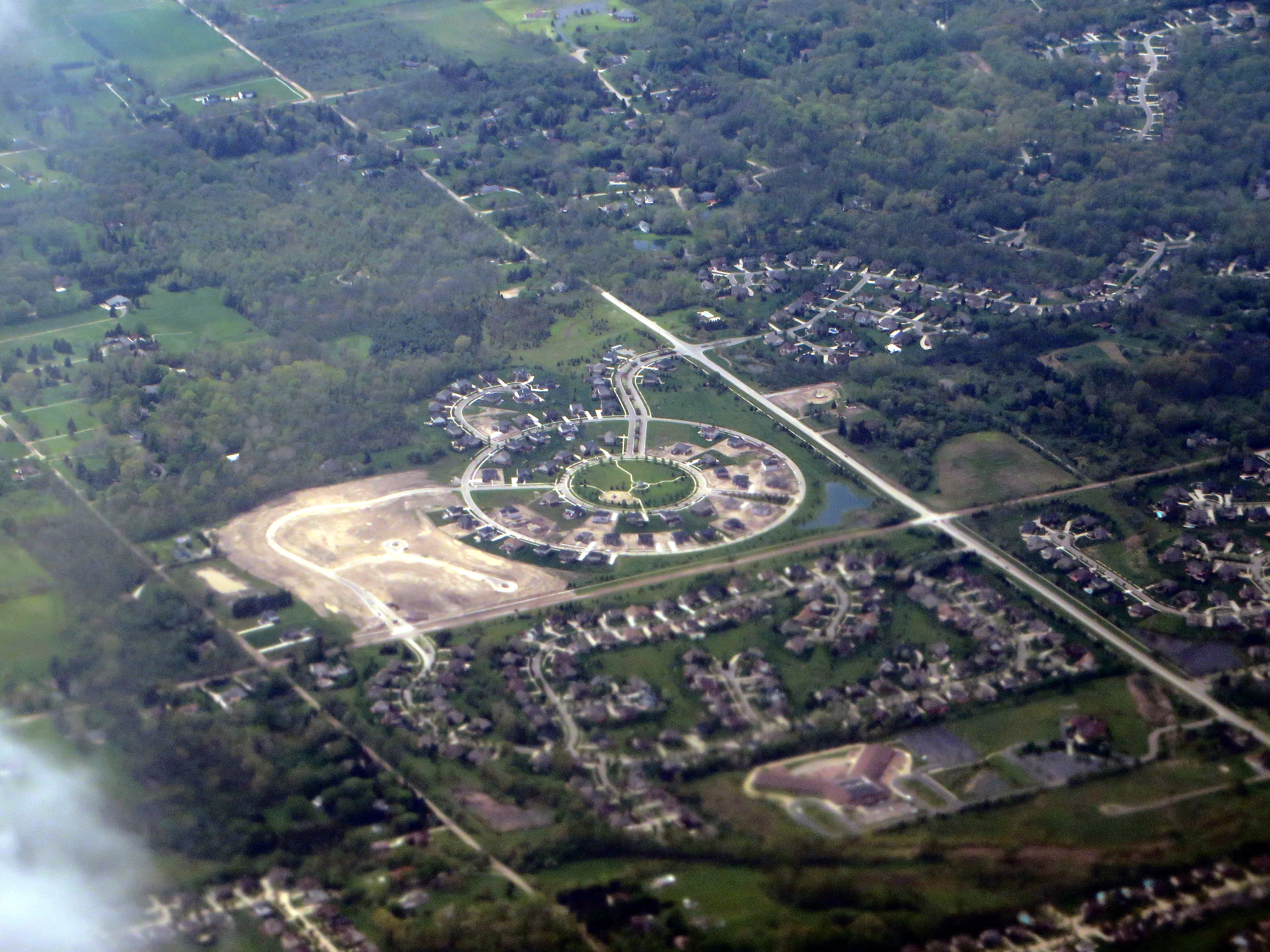
Aerial view looking west at the intersection of Warren and Ridge roads

Historical population
Census	Pop.	Note	%±
1850	1,333		—
1860	1,547		16.1%
1870	1,350		−12.7%
1880	1,392		3.1%
1890	1,184		−14.9%
1900	1,218		2.9%
1910	1,113		−8.6%
1920	1,219		9.5%
1930	1,583		29.9%
1940	2,111		33.4%
1950	3,761		78.2%
1960	5,313		41.3%
1970	11,057		108.1%
1980	48,616		339.7%
1990	57,047		17.3%
2000	76,366		33.9%
2010	90,173		18.1%
2020	98,659		9.4%
2023 (est.)	98,041		−0.6%

The U.S. Census Bureau defined Canton Township as both a township and a census-designated place (CDP) at the 2000 U.S. census so that the community would appear on the list of places (like cities and villages) as well on the list of county subdivisions (like other townships). The final statistics for the township and the CDP were identical. In the 2010 U.S. census, it was designated as a charter township

=== Racial and ethnic composition ===
Canton Charter Township, Michigan – Racial and ethnic composition Note: the US Census treats Hispanic/Latino as an ethnic category. This table excludes Latinos from the racial categories and assigns them to a separate category. Hispanics/Latinos may be of any race.
Race / Ethnicity (NH = Non-Hispanic)	Pop 2000	Pop 2010	Pop 2020	% 2000	% 2010	% 2020
White alone (NH)	62,846	63,165	60,325	82.30%	70.05%	61.14%
Black or African American alone (NH)	3,434	9,070	10,549	4.50%	10.06%	10.69%
Native American or Alaska Native alone (NH)	205	206	170	0.27%	0.23%	0.17%
Asian alone (NH)	6,634	12,720	19,148	8.69%	14.11%	19.41%
Native Hawaiian or Pacific Islander alone (NH)	14	21	11	0.02%	0.02%	0.01%
Other race alone (NH)	145	136	423	0.19%	0.15%	0.43%
Mixed race or Multiracial (NH)	1,300	2,033	4,284	1.70%	2.25%	4.34%
Hispanic or Latino (any race)	1,788	2,822	3,749	2.34%	3.13%	3.80%
Total	76,366	90,173	98,659	100.00%	100.00%	100.00%

=== 2020 census ===
As of the census of 2010, there were 90,173 people, 32,771 households, and 24,231 families residing in the township. The population density was 2,121.5 inhabitants per square mile (819.1/km^{2}). There were 34,829 housing units at an average density of 789.8 per square mile (304.9/km^{2}). The racial makeup of the township was 72.2% White, 10.2% African American, 0.2% Native American, 14.1% Asian (8.0% Indian, 2.2% Chinese, 0.7% Filipino), 0.0% Pacific Islander, 0.7% from other races, and 1.91% from two or more races; 3.1% of the population was Hispanic or Latino of any race.

There were 27,490 households, out of which 42.0% had children under the age of 18 living with them, 63.4% were married couples living together, 8.6% had a female householder with no husband present, and 25.2% were non-families. 20.5% of all households were made up of individuals, and 4.8% had someone living alone who was 65 years of age or older. The average household size was 2.77 and the average family size was 3.26. The median household price was $239,900 according to the U.S. Census Bureau's 2006 American Community Survey estimates.

In the township, 29.0% of the population was under the age of 18, 8.0% was from 18 to 24, 34.9% from 25 to 44, 22.1% from 45 to 64, and 5.9% was 65 years of age or older. The median age was 33 years. For every 100 females, there were 98.0 males. For every 100 females age 18 and over, there were 96.2 males.

According to a 2007 estimate, the median income for a household in the township was $82,669, and the median income for a family was $95,267. Males had a median income of $61,570 versus $35,615 for females. The per capita income for the township was $28,609. About 2.9% of families and 3.7% of the population were below the poverty line, including 4.2% of those under age 18 and 5.5% of those age 65 or over.

== Notable people ==
- Precious Adams, ballet dancer who was born and raised in Canton
- Andrew Bazzi, singer-songwriter
- Kyle Brindza, American football placekicker, played for the Detroit Lions, Tampa Bay Buccaneers, and New York Jets
- Brian Calhoun, back-up running back for the Detroit Lions
- Paul Cotter, American professional ice hockey forward
- Alex Foster, American professional ice hockey forward player
- Michael Jordan, collegiate football player for Ohio State and current member of the Carolina Panthers
- Robert L. McKenzie, also known as Bobby McKenzie, a domestic and foreign policy analyst, public commentator, and scholar of the Middle East and North Africa. He is a visiting fellow at the Brookings Institution, a former Democratic nominee for Michigan's 11th congressional district, and a former Senior Advisor at the US Department of State.
- Alec Pantaleo, 2022 U.S. Open National Champion in freestyle wrestling, three-time NCAA wrestling All-American at Michigan
- Nathan Perkovich, forward for the Medvescak Zagreb of KHL and Albany Devils of AHL; grew up in Canton
- Nate Robertson, former MLB pitcher for the Detroit Tigers, Florida Marlins, and Philadelphia Phillies
- Matt Roy, professional ice hockey player
- Allison Schmitt, Olympic gold medalist swimmer in 2012 Summer Olympics and 2016 Summer Olympics; Team USA swim captain
- Jason Stollsteimer, vocalist and guitarist of the band The Von Bondies, attended Plymouth-Canton Educational Park
- Emily Turner, professional basketball player in the Women's National Basketball Association
- Charles Williams (ice hockey), professional hockey player
- James Wisniewski, defenseman for the Carolina Hurricanes; previously with Anaheim Ducks, Columbus Blue Jackets, Chicago Blackhawks, New York Islanders, and Montreal Canadiens; born in Canton
- Brandi Rhodes Pro Wrestling personality born in Canton

== Gallery ==
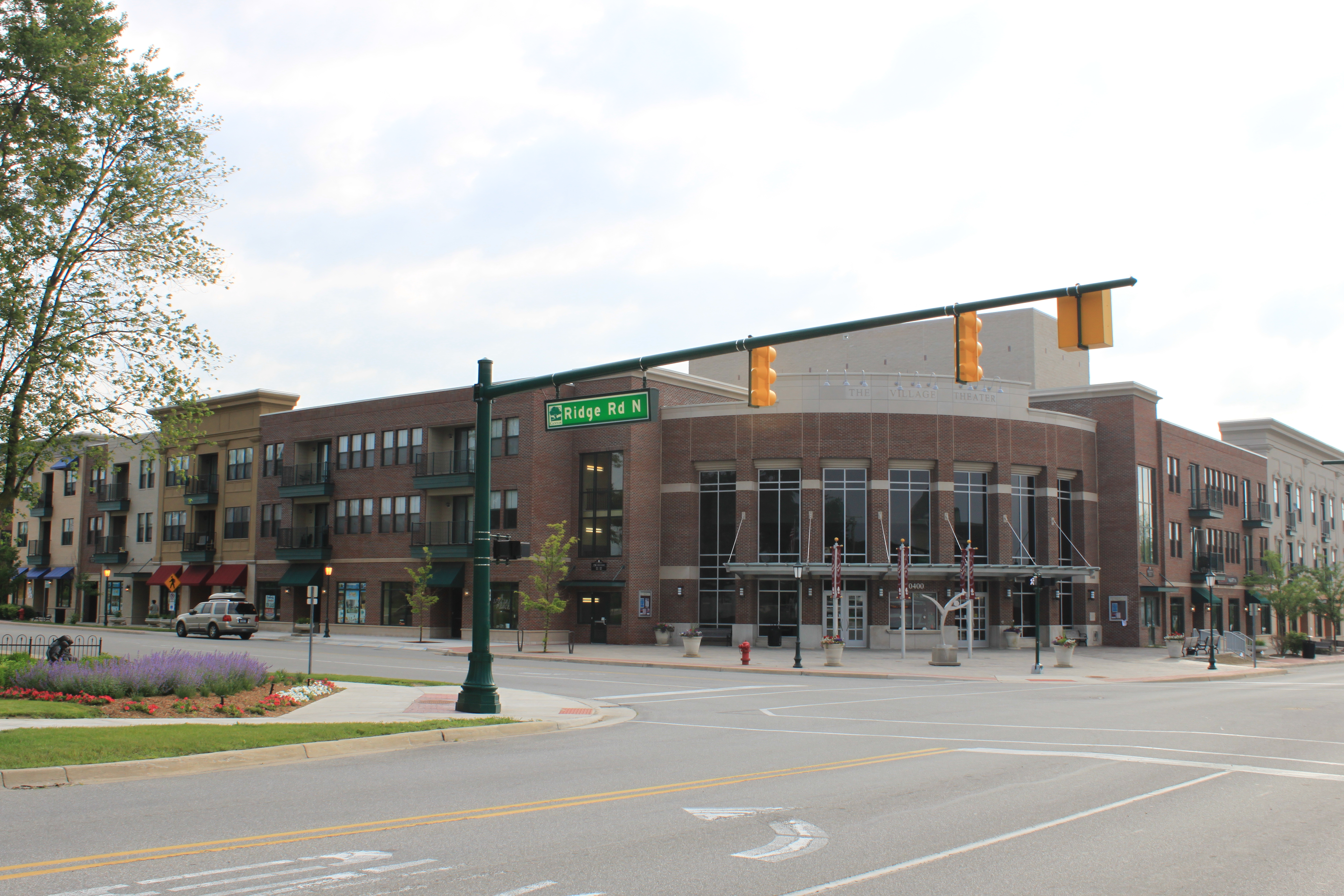
The Village Theater

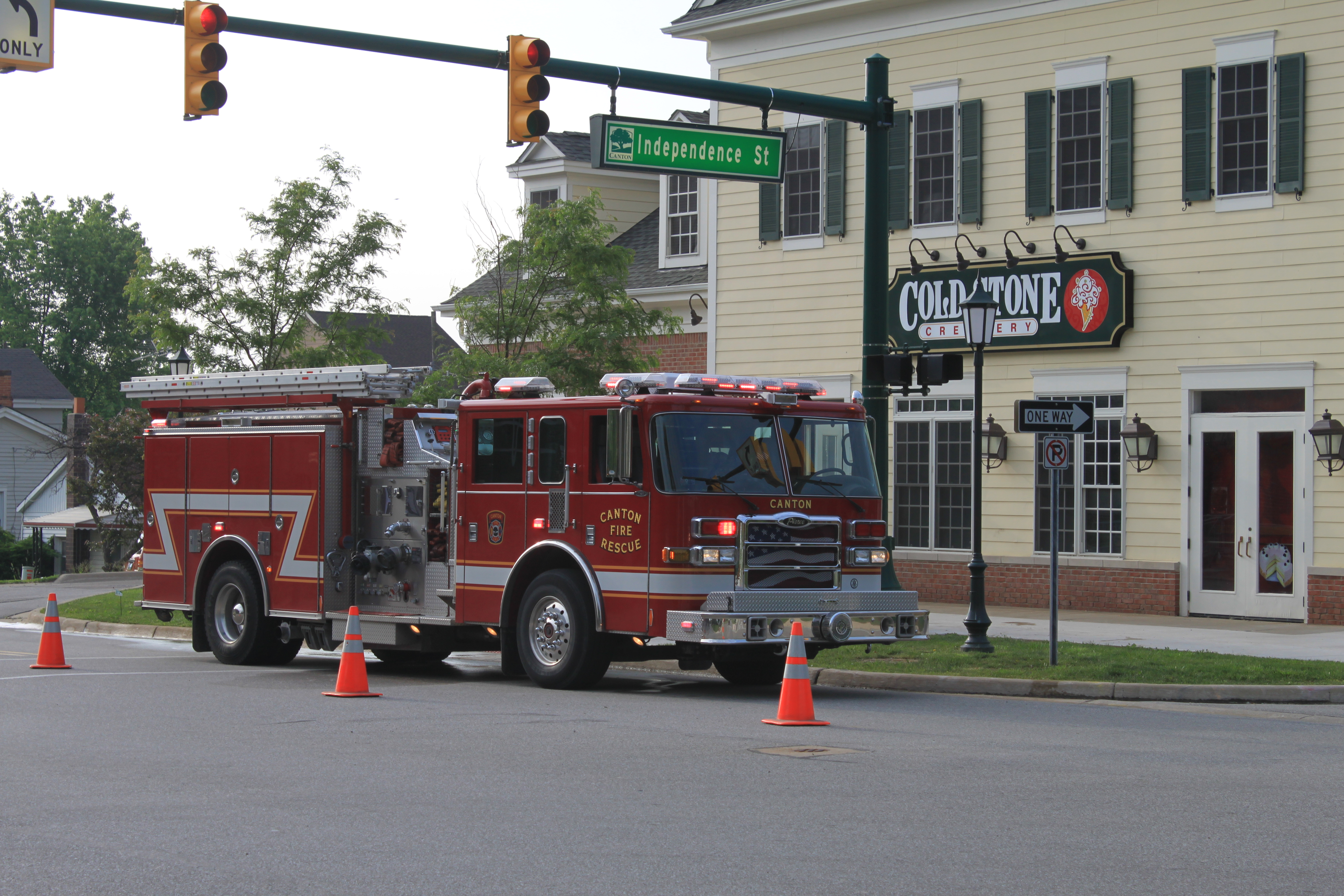
Canton Twp. Fire Rescue Truck

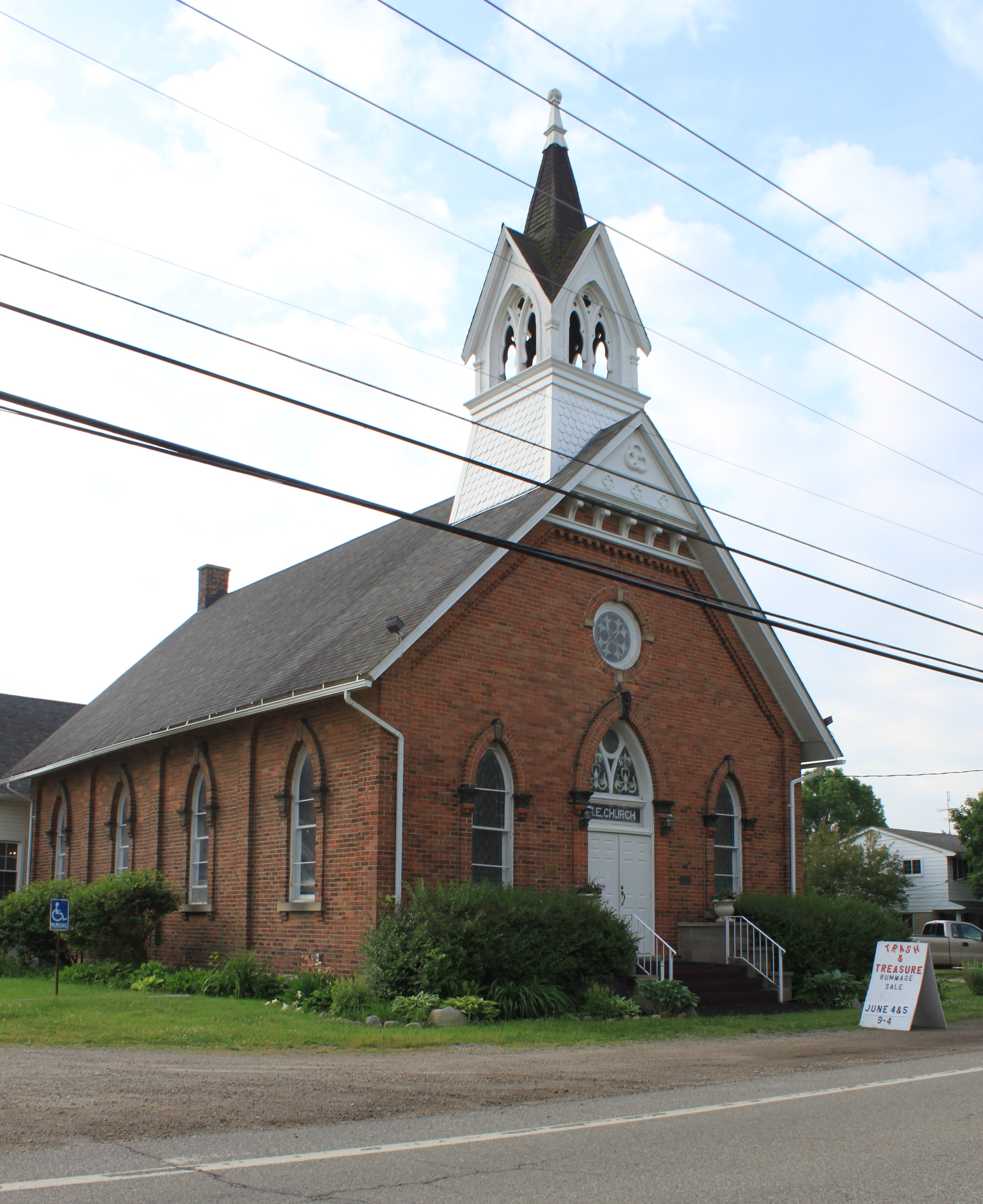
Cherry Hill United Methodist Church, erected 1882

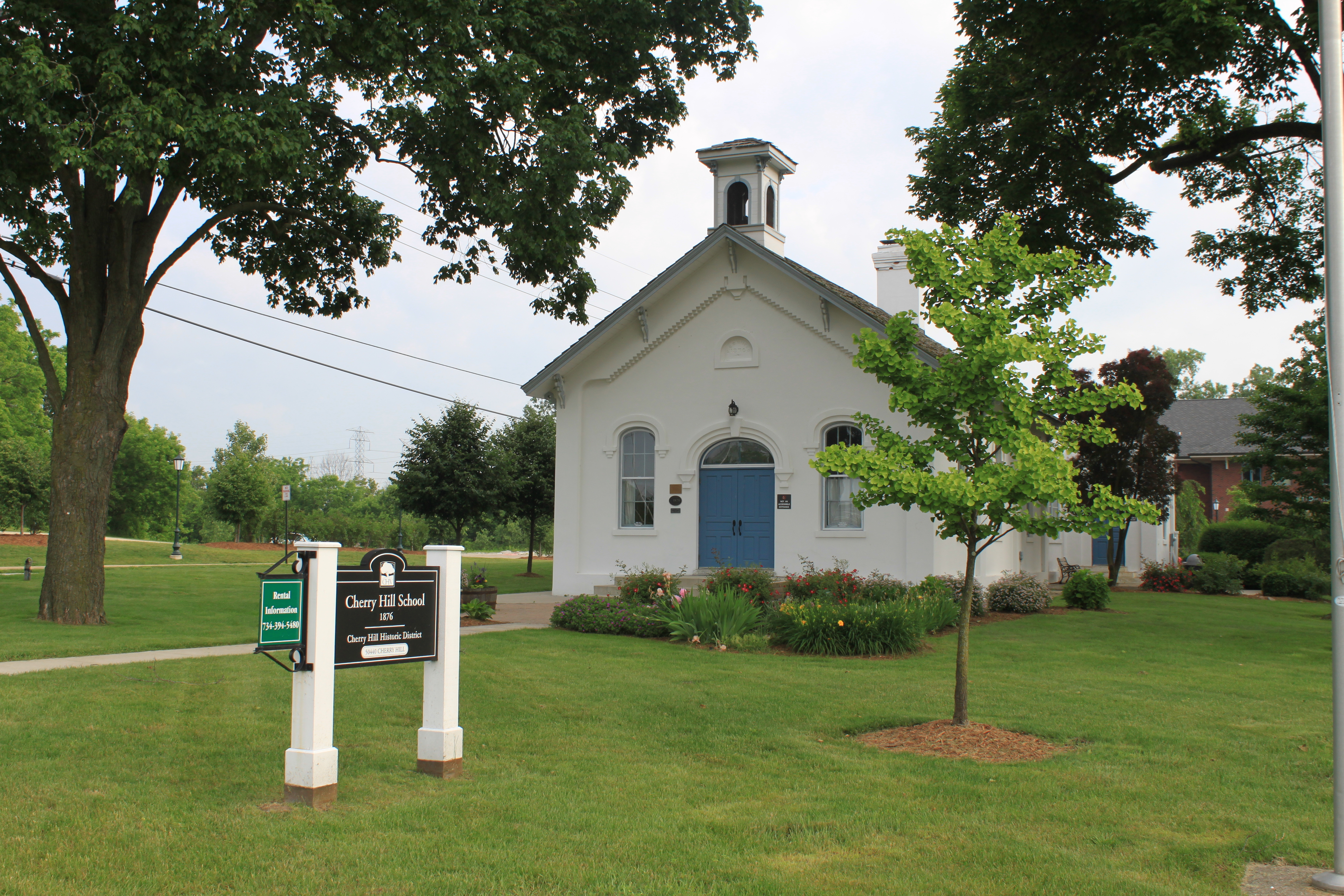
Cherry Hill School

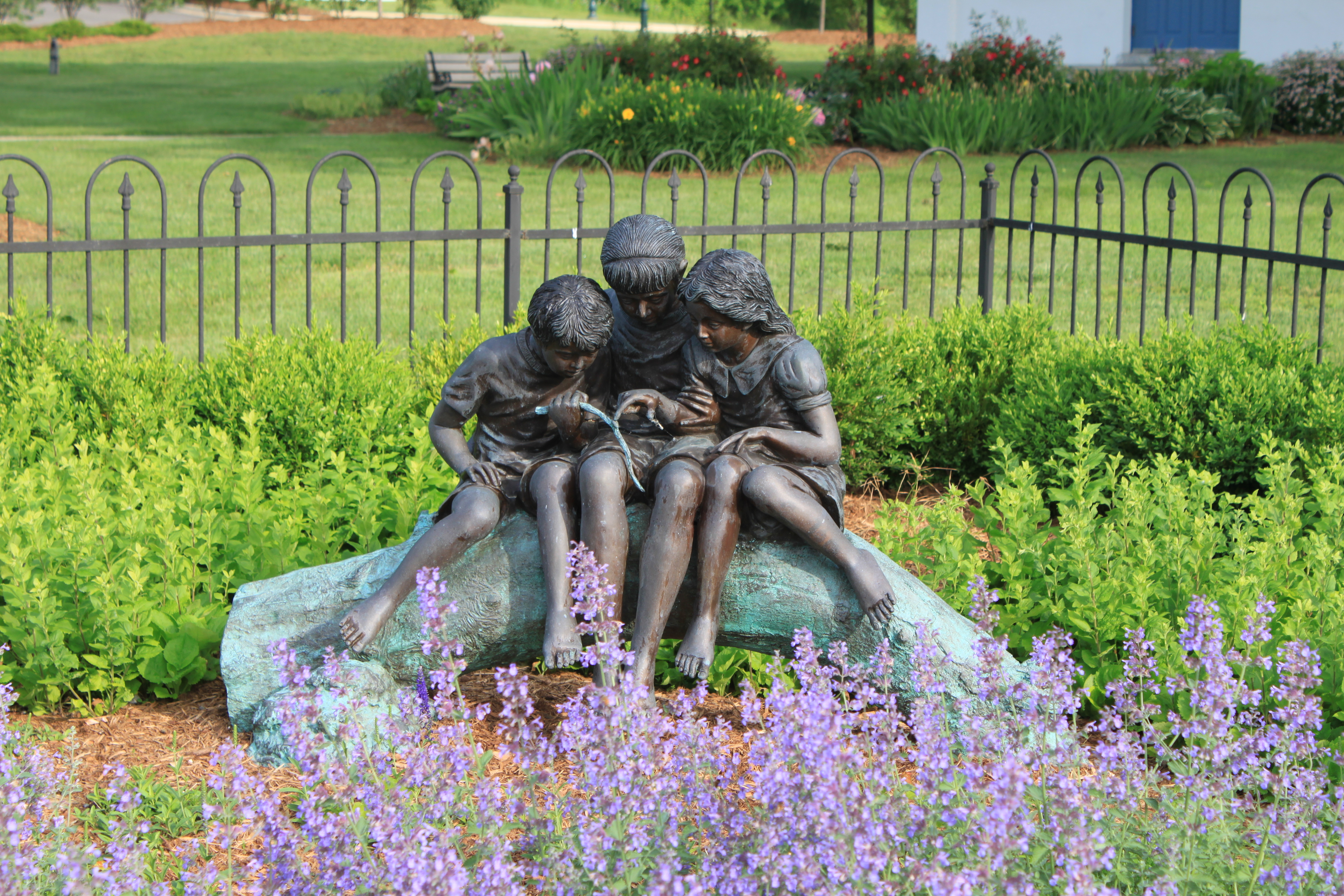
Bronze statue, Cherry Hill School

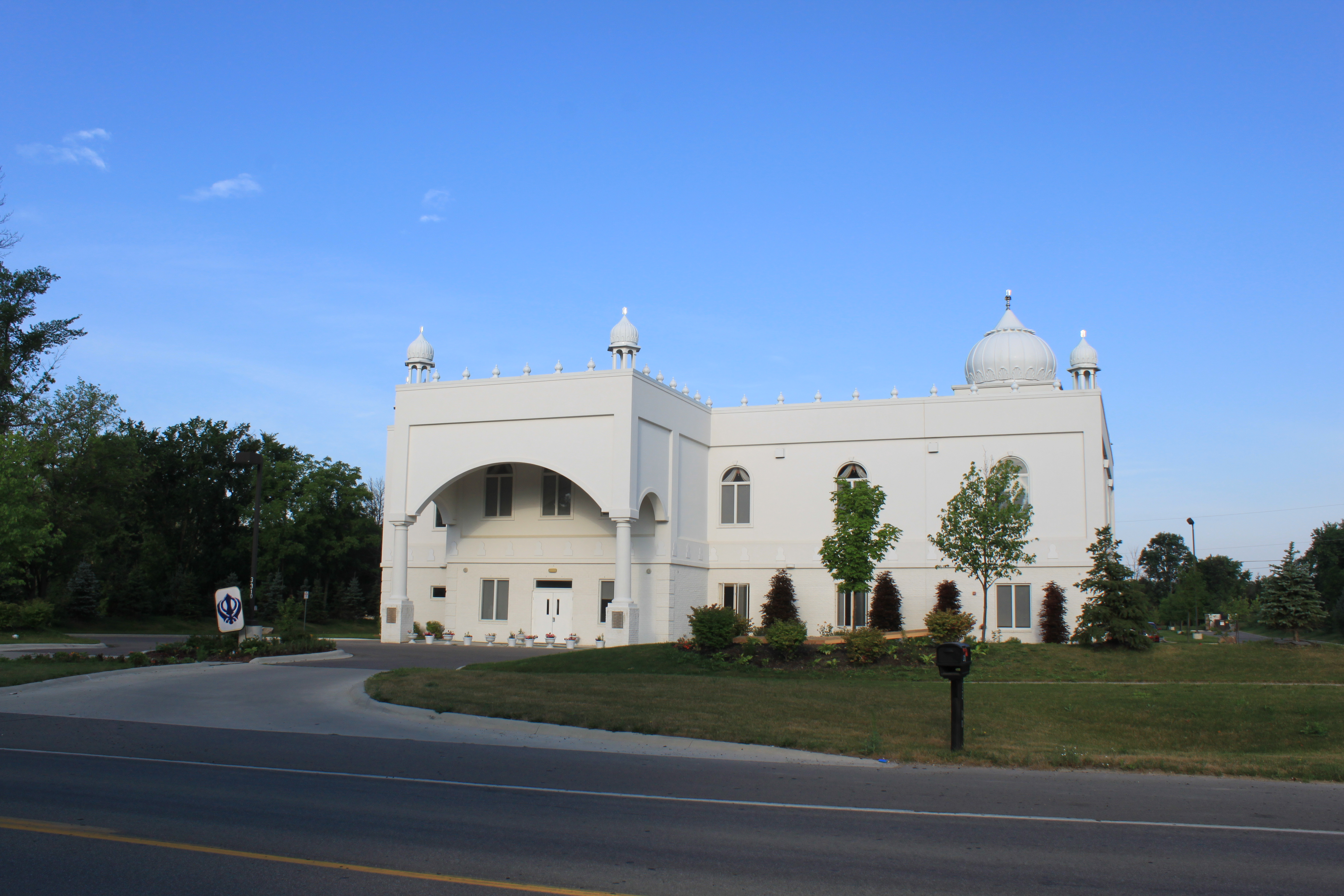
Gurudwara Sahib Sikh Temple, Canton Center Rd.

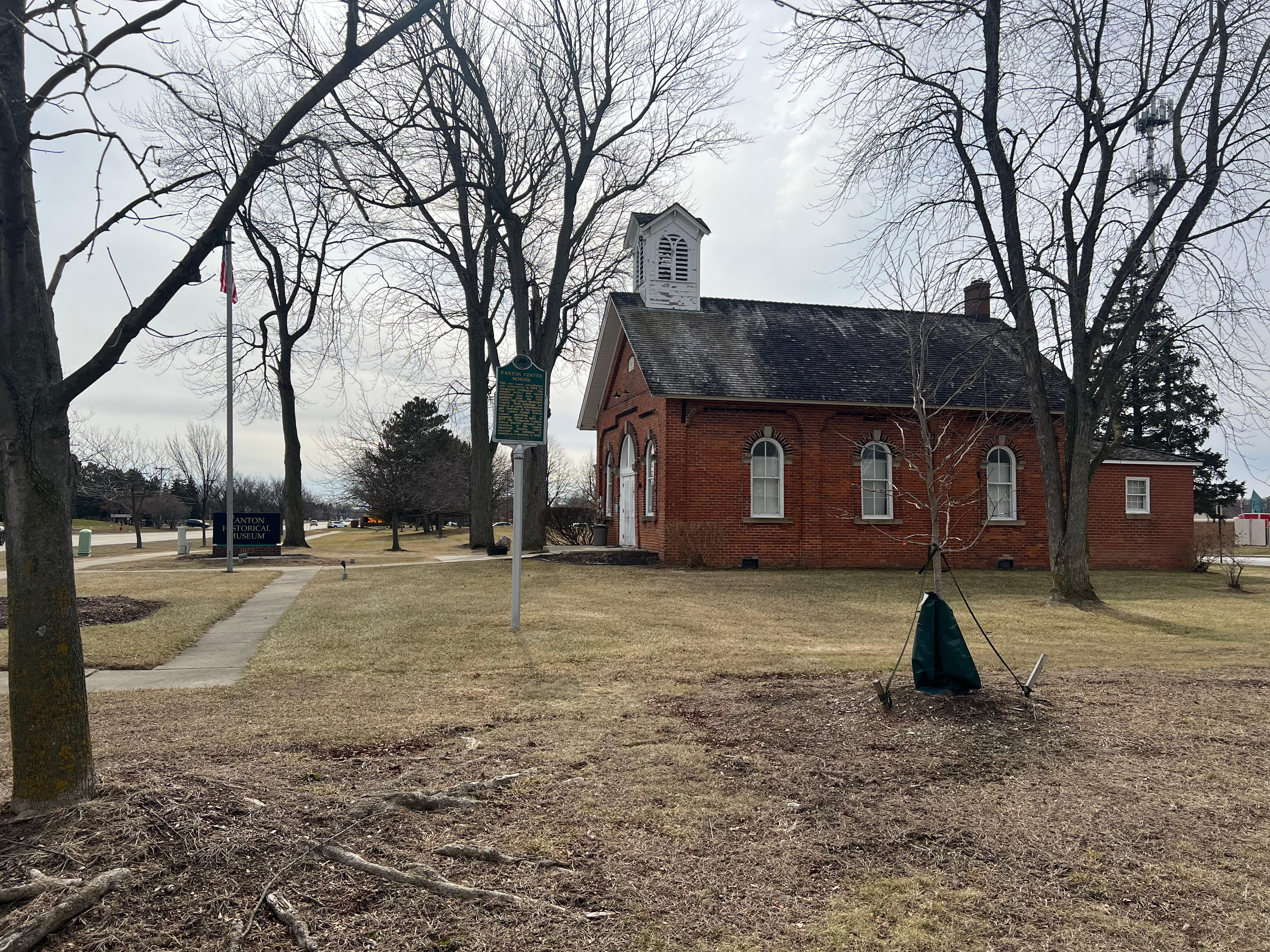
Canton Historical Museum located off Canton Center Rd.
