= Plymouth, Michigan =

- City
- City of Plymouth
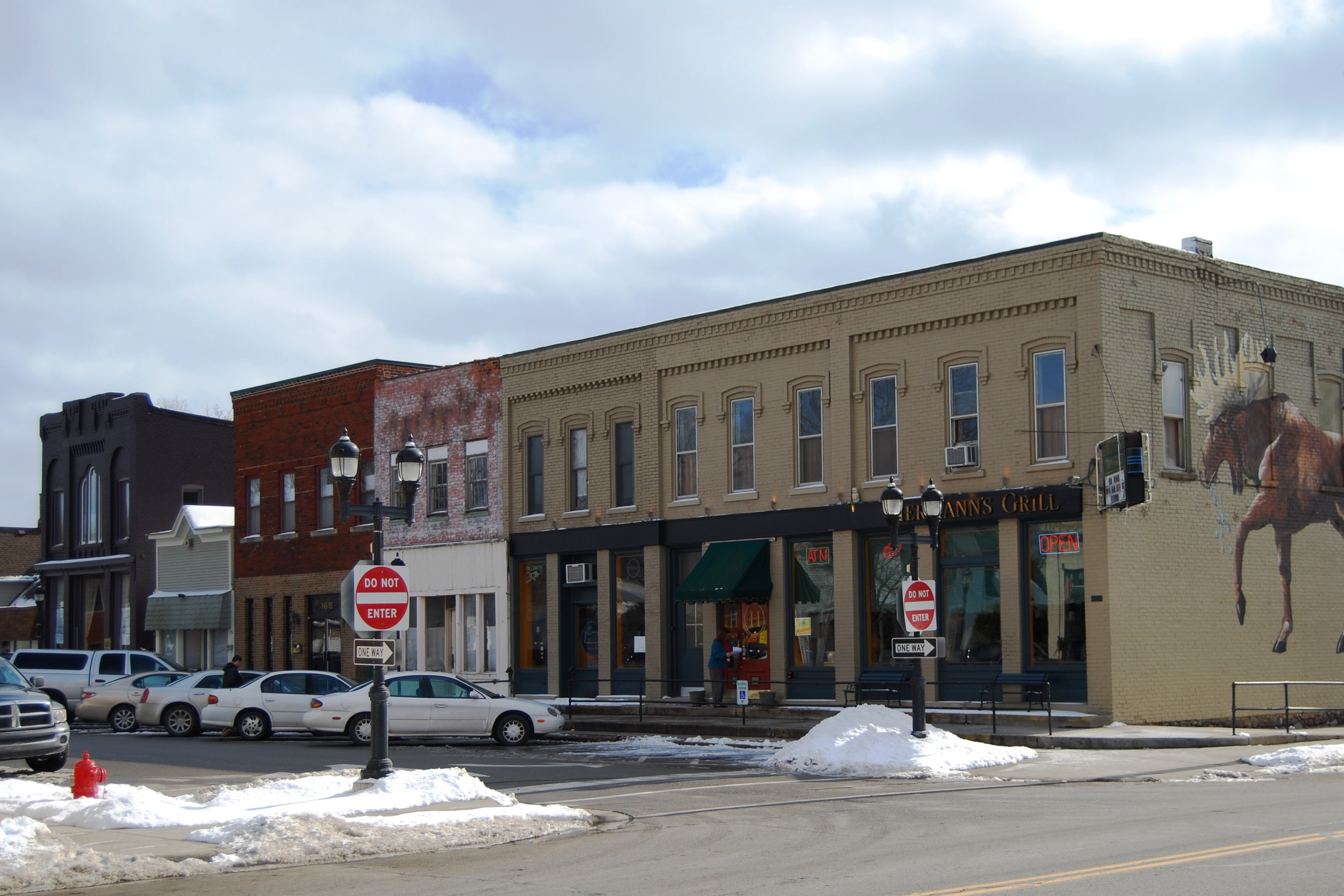
- Old Village along Liberty Street
- Motto: The village of homes
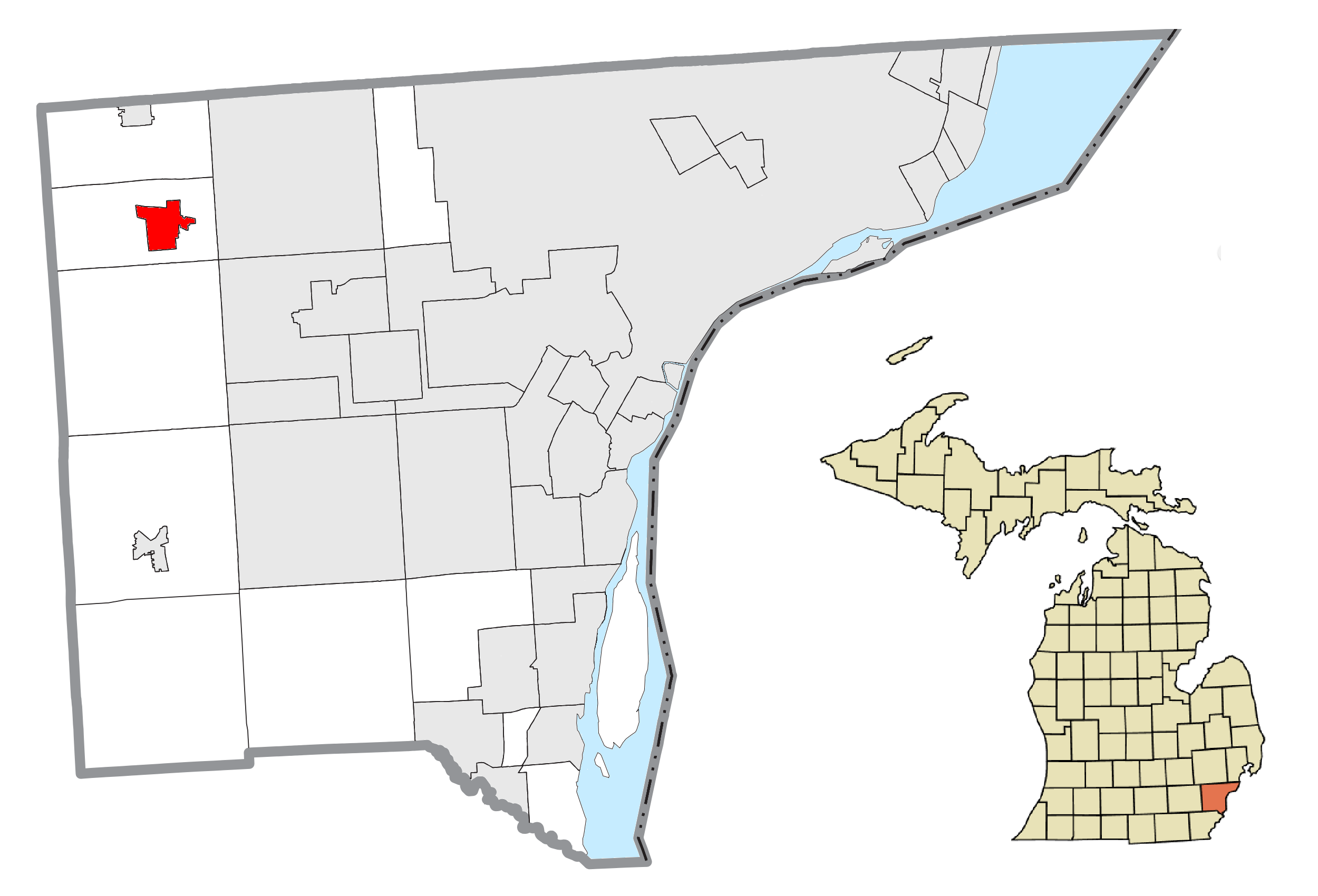
- Location within Wayne County

- Location within the state of Michigan Location within the United States
- Coordinates: 42°22′17″N 83°28′14″W
- Country: United States
- State: Michigan
- County: Wayne
- Settled: 1825
- Incorporated: 1867 (village); 1932 (city)

Government
  - Type: Council–manager
  - Mayor: Suzi Deal
  - Manager: Paul Sincock

Area
  - City: 2.22 sq mi (5.76 km^{2})
  - Land: 2.21 sq mi (5.73 km^{2})
  - Water: 0.012 sq mi (0.03 km^{2}) 0.45%
- Elevation: 725 ft (221 m)

Population (2020)
  - City: 9,370
  - Estimate (2021): 9,313
  - Density: 4,236.2/sq mi (1,635.61/km^{2})
  - Metro: 4,365,205 (Metro Detroit)
- Time zone: UTC-5 (EST)
  - Summer (DST): UTC-4 (EDT)
- ZIP code(s): 48170
- Area code: 734
- FIPS code: 26-65060
- GNIS feature ID: 0635148
- Website: plymouthmi.gov

Plymouth is a city in Wayne County in the U.S. state of Michigan. A western suburb of Detroit, Plymouth is located roughly 27 miles (43.5 km) northwest of downtown Detroit, and 18 miles (29.0 km) northeast of Ann Arbor. As of the 2020 census, the city had a population of 9,370. It is surrounded by, but independent of, Plymouth Township.

== Geography ==
According to the United States Census Bureau, the city has a total area of 2.22 square miles (5.75 km^{2}), of which 2.21 square miles (5.72 km^{2}) is land and 0.01 square miles (0.03 km^{2}) is water. It is located just south of the M-14 highway and west of Interstate 275.

== Culture ==
Plymouth has a variety of shops, restaurants, and other cultural activities.

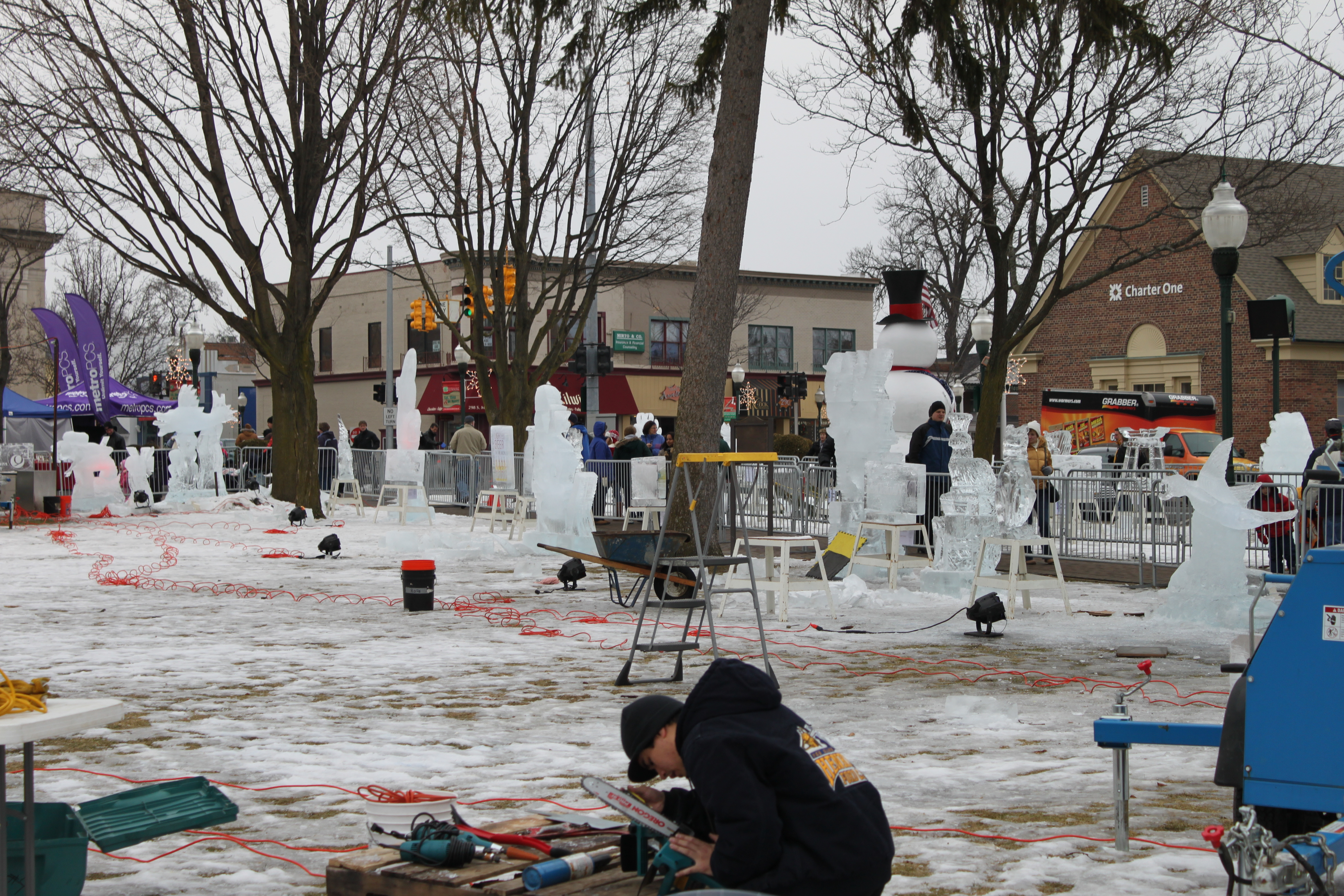
Plymouth Ice Festival, 2010

The Plymouth Ice Spectacular, the largest ice carving festival in North America, is held every year in Plymouth in late January. Founded in 1982 by then 25-year-old Scott Lorenz, the weekend-long event draws an average of 500,000 people to Plymouth each year and has helped establish ice carving as a world-class competitive event.

Since 2008, Plymouth has been home to the Green Street Fair, held over a weekend each May. Featuring green-themed exhibitors and activities, the event has become a yearly tradition. In 2011, the event was attended by about 90,000 visitors.

Plymouth's "Art in the Park" is an art fair held annually since 1980.

== History ==
Plymouth was first settled in 1825, incorporated as a village in 1867, and became a city in 1932.

=== Foundation ===
In 1825, Luther Lincoln was granted two land patents in what is now Plymouth by the federal government. Lincoln built his place of business, his saw mill, and abode, near the eastern boundary of his land, along the Rouge River. His actual abode and saw mill was always outside the city limits. Another early settler was William Starkweather. William and his wife Keziah brought their firstborn son Albert to the area and built the first home in Plymouth, at what is now the southwest corner of Main Street and Ann Arbor Trail. The first home was a lean-to, and was later replaced by a log cabin, which has since been destroyed.

=== Growth ===
In 1831, William Starkweather sold his land in downtown Plymouth and in 1831 purchased an 80-acre (320,000 m^{2}) parcel of land in what was then called "North Village" (now called "The Historic Old Village"). In 1844, William died and the land in Old Village was then passed to William's son, George A Starkweather. George felt that the railroad coming to North Village would give it a commercial advantage over the Kellogg Park area. In the 1860s, he convinced the Detroit and Howell Railroad Company to build through the town. Starkweather was responsible for cutting Oak Street North through his farm in order to reach his new store and the train station. After his death in 1907, Oak Street was renamed Starkweather in his honor.

Notable streets in Plymouth are named after some Starkweather family members, including Blanche (after Blanche Starkweather, daughter of George Starkweather), Karmada (after the grandchildren of George Starkweather – Karl, Max and Davis), Davis – after Davis B Hillmer – youngest grandson of George Starkweather, Starkweather (formerly Oak Street), Amelia (after Lydia Amelia Heywood – Davis - Starkweather) – George Starkweather's wife, and Rose – after Rose Hillmer, eldest grand daughter of George Starkweather. Starkweather Elementary School was named after George Anson Starkweather of Plymouth, which was converted to an adult education center.

Daisy Manufacturing Company, now Daisy Outdoor Products, started in 1882 in Plymouth as the Plymouth Iron Windmill Company. In 1886 Plymouth inventor Clarence Hamilton introduced a new idea to the windmill company. It was a combination of metal and wire, vaguely resembling a gun that could fire a lead ball using compressed air. Lewis Cass Hough, then president of the firm, gave it a try and, after his first shot, enthusiastically exclaimed, "Boy, that's a daisy!" The name stuck, and the BB gun went into production as a premium item given to farmers when they purchased a windmill. The gun was such a huge success that Plymouth Iron Windmill soon began manufacturing the Daisy BB gun in place of windmills. On January 26, 1895, the company's board of directors officially voted to change the name to Daisy Manufacturing Company, Inc.

=== Recent history ===
Much to the dismay of Plymouth residents, Daisy moved its corporate offices and manufacturing facilities from Plymouth to Rogers, Arkansas in 1958.

In 2003 the former Daisy factory was converted to Daisy Square Condominiums despite being situated next to an active freight rail line. The front wall of the Daisy factory was left standing to be built into the apartment building. The wall has since been demolished.

In 2009 Plymouth Township was named 28th Best Place to Live in the United States by CNN Money Magazine.

== Demographics ==
Historical population
Census	Pop.	Note	%±
1860	820		—
1870	969		18.2%
1880	1,025		5.8%
1890	1,172		14.3%
1900	1,474		25.8%
1910	1,671		13.4%
1920	2,857		71.0%
1930	4,484		56.9%
1940	5,360		19.5%
1950	6,637		23.8%
1960	8,766		32.1%
1970	11,758		34.1%
1980	9,986		−15.1%
1990	9,560		−4.3%
2000	9,022		−5.6%
2010	9,132		1.2%
2020	9,370		2.6%
2021 (est.)	9,313		−0.6%
U.S. Decennial Census; 2020 Census

=== Racial and ethnic composition ===
Plymouth city, Michigan – Racial and ethnic composition Note: the US Census treats Hispanic/Latino as an ethnic category. This table excludes Latinos from the racial categories and assigns them to a separate category. Hispanics/Latinos may be of any race.
Race / Ethnicity (NH = Non-Hispanic)	Pop 2000	Pop 2010	Pop 2020	% 2000	% 2010	% 2020
White alone (NH)	8,616	8,469	8,351	95.50%	92.74%	89.12%
Black or African American alone (NH)	51	144	120	0.57%	1.58%	1.28%
Native American or Alaska Native alone (NH)	31	22	10	0.34%	0.24%	0.11%
Asian alone (NH)	95	199	211	1.05%	2.18%	2.25%
Native Hawaiian or Pacific Islander alone (NH)	5	2	0	0.06%	0.02%	0.00%
Other race alone (NH)	6	12	27	0.07%	0.13%	0.29%
Mixed race or Multiracial (NH)	100	121	373	1.11%	1.33%	3.98%
Hispanic or Latino (any race)	118	163	278	1.31%	1.78%	2.97%
Total	9,022	9,132	9,370	100.00%	100.00%	100.00%

=== 2020 census ===
As of the 2020 census, Plymouth had a population of 9,370. The median age was 42.5 years. 17.9% of residents were under the age of 18 and 18.2% of residents were 65 years of age or older. For every 100 females there were 92.6 males, and for every 100 females age 18 and over there were 90.7 males age 18 and over.

100.0% of residents lived in urban areas, while 0.0% lived in rural areas.

There were 4,466 households in Plymouth, of which 22.4% had children under the age of 18 living in them. Of all households, 42.0% were married-couple households, 21.9% were households with a male householder and no spouse or partner present, and 30.1% were households with a female householder and no spouse or partner present. About 42.1% of all households were made up of individuals and 15.4% had someone living alone who was 65 years of age or older.

There were 4,700 housing units, of which 5.0% were vacant. The homeowner vacancy rate was 1.1% and the rental vacancy rate was 4.9%.

Racial composition as of the 2020 census
Race	Number	Percent
White	8,420	89.9%
Black or African American	127	1.4%
American Indian and Alaska Native	13	0.1%
Asian	213	2.3%
Native Hawaiian and Other Pacific Islander	0	0.0%
Some other race	65	0.7%
Two or more races	532	5.7%

=== 2010 census ===
As of the census of 2010, there were 9,132 people, 4,314 households, and 2,218 families residing in the city. The population density was 4,132.1 inhabitants per square mile (1,595.4/km^{2}). There were 4,652 housing units at an average density of 2,105.0 per square mile (812.7/km^{2}). The racial makeup of the city was 94.2% White, 1.6% African American, 0.3% Native American, 2.2% Asian, 0.4% from other races, and 1.4% from two or more races. Hispanic or Latino residents of any race were 1.8% of the population.

There were 4,314 households, of which 25.7% had children under the age of 18 living with them, 40.6% were married couples living together, 7.9% had a female householder with no husband present, 2.9% had a male householder with no wife present, and 48.6% were non-families. 42.4% of all households were made up of individuals, and 13.2% had someone living alone who was 65 years of age or older. The average household size was 2.08 and the average family size was 2.93.

The median age in the city was 39.2 years. 21.5% of residents were under the age of 18; 5.7% were between the ages of 18 and 24; 31.8% were from 25 to 44; 27% were from 45 to 64; and 14% were 65 years of age or older. The gender makeup of the city was 48.0% male and 52.0% female.

=== 2000 census ===
As of the census of 2000, there were 9,022 people, 4,322 households, and 2,277 families residing in the city. The population density was 4,048.6 inhabitants per square mile (1,563.2/km^{2}). There were 4,498 housing units at an average density of 2,018.4 per square mile (779.3/km^{2}). The racial makeup of the city was 96.42% White, 0.57% African American, 0.35% Native American, 1.05% Asian, 0.07% Pacific Islander, 0.30% from other races, and 1.24% from two or more races. Hispanic or Latino of any race were 1.31% of the population. 20.4% were of German, 13.2% Irish, 12.4% English, 10.7% Polish and 7.9% Italian ancestry.

There were 4,322 households, of which 22.2% had children under the age of 18 living with them, 42.5% were married couples living together, 7.5% had a female householder with no husband present, and 47.3% were non-families. 41.5% of all households were made up of individuals, and 13.3% had someone living alone who was 65 years of age or older. The average household size was 2.04 and the average family size was 2.81.

In the city, 18.7% of the population was under the age of 18, 5.8% was from 18 to 24, 37.5% from 25 to 44, 21.7% from 45 to 64, and 16.2% was 65 years of age or older. The median age was 38 years. For every 100 females, there were 88.7 males. For every 100 females age 18 and over, there were 85.4 males.

The median income for a household in the city was $51,535, and the median income for a family was $76,369. Males had a median income of $52,188 versus $37,113 for females. The per capita income for the city was $33,222. About 1.9% of families and 3.3% of the population were below the poverty line, including 3.8% of those under age 18 and 3.6% of those age 65 or over.

== Government and infrastructure ==
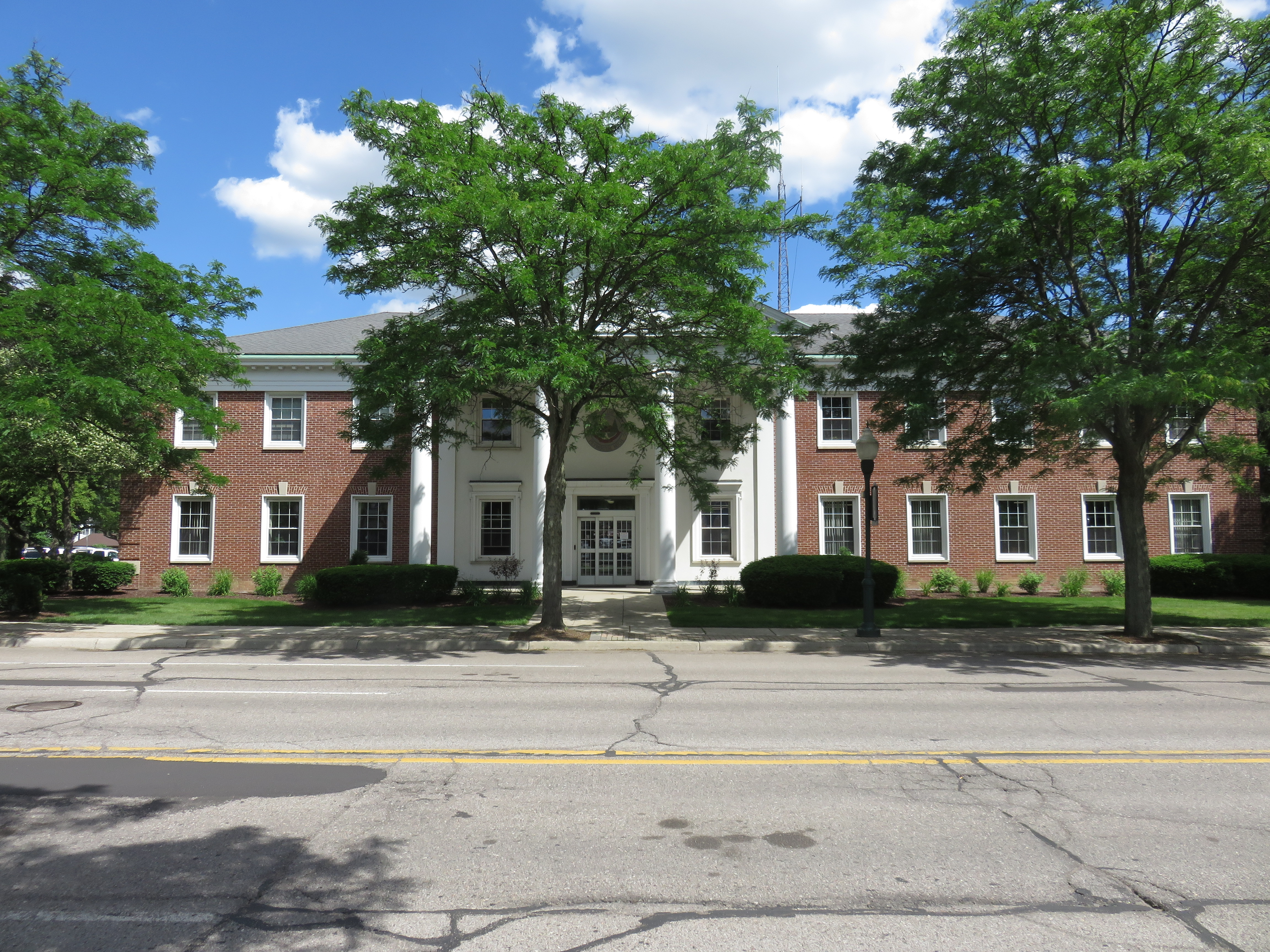
Plymouth City Hall

In 1995, the City of Plymouth and Plymouth Township consolidated their fire departments with the township controlling fire services. The township receives $1 million from the city, making up 25% of the consolidated fire department's budget.

== Schools ==
=== Primary and secondary ===
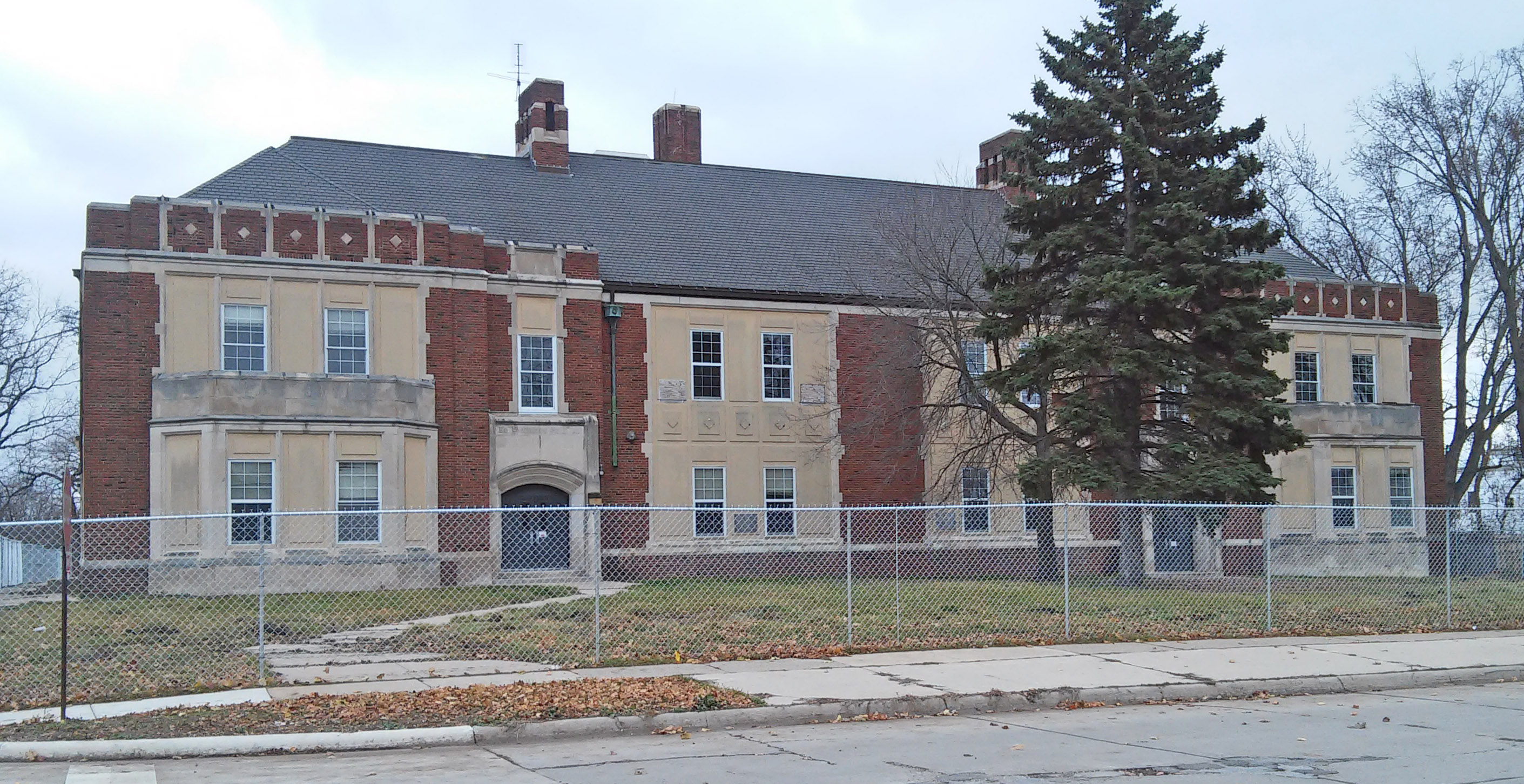
Starkweather School

The Plymouth-Canton Community School District consists of three high schools, five middle schools, and sixteen elementary schools. The district has the only educational park in Michigan, the Plymouth-Canton Educational Park (P-CEP).

Other schools:

- Spiritus Sanctus Academy Catholic School (private)
- New Morning School (private)
- Our Lady of Good Counsel Catholic School (private)
- Ivywood Classical Academy (public/charter)

=== Colleges and universities ===
Plymouth is home to a campus of Moody Bible Institute. While the campus offers an option for an undergraduate degree completion program, the majority of the programs offered fall under Moody's Theological Seminary and Graduate School. Graduate certificates, master's and doctoral degrees focus on Bible, theology, and practical ministry training. In addition, they offer programs in counseling psychology and clinical mental health counseling. The Mayhew Graduate Library on the campus is widely known as a premiere theological library for the school and community.

== Notable people ==
- Edward Samuel Corwin, author and former president of the American Political Science Association
- Margaret Dunning, philanthropist
- Ron Egloff, NFL football player
- Kathryn O. Galbraith
- Tom Hulce, actor
- Aidan Hutchinson, defensive end for the Detroit Lions, former player for Michigan
- Russell Kirk, political theorist, influential on American conservatism
- Mel Larson, racing driver
- Jeremy Porter, musician
- Alex Shelley, professional wrestler
- Rufus Thayer, Judge of the United States Court for China
- Paul Warren, musician

== Bibliography ==
- Hillmer, Mary K. Starkweather. My People: Some Ancestors of the Starkweather – Heywood – Hillmer Family From Earliest Known Beginnings to 1948.
- Hudson, Samuel. The Story of Plymouth, Michigan: A Midwest Microcosm. Plymouth, Mich.: Plymouth Historical Society, 1976.
- Kerstens, Elizabeth Kelley. Plymouth's First Century: Innovators and Industry. Chicago: Arcadia Publishing, 2002.
- Kerstens, Elizabeth Kelley. Plymouth in Vintage Postcards. Chicago: Arcadia Publishing, 2003.
- Starkweather, Carlton Lee. A brief genealogical history of Robert Starkweather of Roxbury and Ipswich. Auburn, N.Y.: Knapp, Peck and Thomson, 1904.
