= List of NFL seasons =

The National Football League (NFL) is a professional American football league in the United States and the highest professional level of American football in the world. It was formed in 1920 as the American Professional Football Association (APFA) before adopting its current name for the 1922 season. After initially determining champions through end-of-season standings, a playoff system was implemented in 1933 that culminated with the NFL Championship Game. Following an agreement to merge the NFL with the rival American Football League (AFL) in 1966, the Super Bowl was first held in 1967 to determine a champion between the best team from each league and has remained as the final game ever since the merger was completed in 1970. All AFL records, including the Championship Games, were added to NFL record books as part of the merger agreement, and the teams were evenly divided between the newly formed American Football Conference (AFC) and National Football Conference (NFC).

Since 2002, the league has consisted of 32 teams based across the United States. Each NFL season, since 2021, has started with a three-week preseason in August, followed by an 18-week regular season which runs from early September to early January, with each team playing 17 games and having one bye week. Following the conclusion of the regular season, seven teams from each conference (four division winners and three wild cards) advance to the playoffs, a single-elimination tournament that culminates in the Super Bowl, which is contested in February between the two conference champions.

== Early years (1920–1932) ==
Early championships between 1920 and 1932 were awarded to the team with the best won-lost record, initially rather haphazardly, as some teams played more games than others, or scheduled games against non-league, amateur or collegiate teams. This led to the 1920 title being determined during a league meeting after the season, the 1921 title being decided on a controversial tiebreaker, a disputed 1925 title, and the scheduling of an impromptu 1932 indoor playoff game.

Season	No. of teams	Champion	Ref.
1920	14	Akron Pros (Note: No official standings were recorded for the 1920 season and teams played games against opponents outside of the league. The championship was awarded to the Akron Pros during the league meeting on April 30, 1921.)	
1921	21	Chicago Staleys (Note: The Chicago Staleys defeated the Buffalo All-Americans on a controversial tiebreaker to decide the 1921 league championship.)	
1922	18	Canton Bulldogs	
1923	20	Canton Bulldogs	
1924	18	Cleveland Bulldogs	
1925	20	Chicago Cardinals (Note: The Chicago Cardinals were awarded the 1925 championship controversially because the Pottsville Maroons had been suspended from the NFL for playing an exhibition game against a group of Notre Dame All-Stars.)	
1926	22	Frankford Yellow Jackets	
1927	12	New York Giants	
1928	10	Providence Steam Roller	
1929	12	Green Bay Packers	
1930	11	Green Bay Packers	
1931	10	Green Bay Packers	
1932	8	Chicago Bears (Note: The Chicago Bears and the Portsmouth Spartans finished with identical win–loss records, tying for first place in the 1932 season. To resolve the tie, a playoff game was held between the two, counting towards the regular-season total. Chicago won the game and the championship while Portsmouth's loss dropped them to third place, behind the Green Bay Packers.)	

== 1933–1959 ==
In 1933, the teams were divided between the Eastern and Western divisions. This became the American and National conferences in 1950 after the NFL absorbed the rival All-America Football Conference (AAFC), then the Eastern and Western conferences in 1953. The two division/conference regular season champions then played in the NFL Championship Game. If two teams tied for the division/conference championship at the end of the regular season, then a one-game playoff was played to determine who would advance to the NFL Championship Game.

Season	No. of teams	Division/Conference champion		NFL Championship Game		Ref.
Season	No. of teams	Eastern Division (1933–1949) American Conference (1950–1952) Eastern Conference (1953–1959)	Western Division (1933–1949) National Conference (1950–1952) Western Conference (1953–1959)	Year	Champion	Ref.
1933	10	New York Giants	Chicago Bears	1933	Chicago Bears	
1934	11	New York Giants	Chicago Bears	1934	New York Giants	
1935	9	New York Giants	Detroit Lions	1935	Detroit Lions	
1936	9	Boston Redskins	Green Bay Packers	1936	Green Bay Packers	
1937	10	Washington Redskins	Chicago Bears	1937	Washington Redskins	
1938	10	New York Giants	Green Bay Packers	1938	New York Giants	
1939	10	New York Giants	Green Bay Packers	1939	Green Bay Packers	
1940	10	Washington Redskins	Chicago Bears	1940	Chicago Bears	
1941	10	New York Giants	Chicago Bears (Note: The Chicago Bears defeated the Green Bay Packers in a one-game playoff.)	1941	Chicago Bears	
1942	10	Washington Redskins	Chicago Bears	1942	Washington Redskins	
1943	8	Washington Redskins (Note: The Washington Redskins defeated the New York Giants in a one-game playoff.)	Chicago Bears	1943	Chicago Bears	
1944	10	New York Giants	Green Bay Packers	1944	Green Bay Packers	
1945	10	Washington Redskins	Cleveland Rams	1945	Cleveland Rams	
1946	10	New York Giants	Chicago Bears	1946	Chicago Bears	
1947	10	Philadelphia Eagles (Note: The Philadelphia Eagles defeated the Pittsburgh Steelers in a one-game playoff.)	Chicago Cardinals	1947	Chicago Cardinals	
1948	10	Philadelphia Eagles	Chicago Cardinals	1948	Philadelphia Eagles	
1949	10	Philadelphia Eagles	Los Angeles Rams	1949	Philadelphia Eagles	
1950	13	Cleveland Browns (Note: The Cleveland Browns defeated the New York Giants in a one-game playoff.)	Los Angeles Rams (Note: The Los Angeles Rams defeated the Chicago Bears in a one-game playoff.)	1950	Cleveland Browns	
1951	12	Cleveland Browns	Los Angeles Rams	1951	Los Angeles Rams	
1952	12	Cleveland Browns	Detroit Lions (Note: The Detroit Lions defeated the Los Angeles Rams in a one-game playoff.)	1952	Detroit Lions	
1953	12	Cleveland Browns	Detroit Lions	1953	Detroit Lions	
1954	12	Cleveland Browns	Detroit Lions	1954	Cleveland Browns	
1955	12	Cleveland Browns	Los Angeles Rams	1955	Cleveland Browns	
1956	12	New York Giants	Chicago Bears	1956	New York Giants	
1957	12	Cleveland Browns	Detroit Lions (Note: The Detroit Lions defeated the San Francisco 49ers in a one-game playoff.)	1957	Detroit Lions	
1958	12	New York Giants	Baltimore Colts	1958	Baltimore Colts	
1959	12	New York Giants	Baltimore Colts	1959	Baltimore Colts	

== War with the AFL (1960–1969) ==
The rival American Football League (AFL) began play in 1960 with its own Eastern and Western divisions and AFL Championship Game. Following an agreement to merge the NFL with AFL, the Super Bowl was first held at the conclusion of the 1966 season to determine an overall champion between the champions of the two leagues. The NFL then established a four-team postseason tournament in 1967, and the AFL did the same in 1969.

NFL						AFL						Super Bowl (1966–1969)		Ref.
Season	No. of teams	Conference champions		Championship Game		Season	No. of teams	Division champions		Championship Game		Game	Champion	Ref.
Season	No. of teams	Eastern Conference	Western Conference	Year	Champion	Season	No. of teams	Eastern Division	Western Division	Year	Champion	Game	Champion	Ref.
1960	13	Philadelphia Eagles	Green Bay Packers	1960	Philadelphia Eagles	1960	8	Houston Oilers	Los Angeles Chargers	1960	Houston Oilers	—N/a		
1961	14	New York Giants	Green Bay Packers	1961	Green Bay Packers	1961	8	Houston Oilers	San Diego Chargers	1961	Houston Oilers	—N/a		
1962	14	New York Giants	Green Bay Packers	1962	Green Bay Packers	1962	8	Houston Oilers	Dallas Texans	1962	Dallas Texans	—N/a		
1963	14	New York Giants	Chicago Bears	1963	Chicago Bears	1963	8	Boston Patriots (Note: The Boston Patriots defeated the Buffalo Bills in a one-game playoff for the AFL Eastern Division.)	San Diego Chargers	1963	San Diego Chargers	—N/a		
1964	14	Cleveland Browns	Baltimore Colts	1964	Cleveland Browns	1964	8	Buffalo Bills	San Diego Chargers	1964	Buffalo Bills	—N/a		
1965	14	Cleveland Browns	Green Bay Packers (Note: The Green Bay Packers defeated the Baltimore Colts in a one-game playoff for the NFL Western Conference.)	1965	Green Bay Packers	1965	8	Buffalo Bills	San Diego Chargers	1965	Buffalo Bills	—N/a		
1966	15	Dallas Cowboys	Green Bay Packers	1966	Green Bay Packers	1966	9	Buffalo Bills	Kansas City Chiefs	1966	Kansas City Chiefs	I	Green Bay Packers	
1967	16	Dallas Cowboys	Green Bay Packers	1967	Green Bay Packers	1967	9	Houston Oilers	Oakland Raiders	1967	Oakland Raiders	II	Green Bay Packers	
1968	16	Cleveland Browns	Baltimore Colts	1968	Baltimore Colts	1968	10	New York Jets	Oakland Raiders (Note: The Oakland Raiders defeated the Kansas City Chiefs in a one-game playoff for the AFL Western Division.)	1968	New York Jets	III	New York Jets	
1969	16	Cleveland Browns	Minnesota Vikings	1969	Minnesota Vikings	1969	10	New York Jets (Note: The New York Jets were defeated by the Kansas City Chiefs in the first round of the expanded four-team 1969 AFL playoffs.)	Oakland Raiders	1969	Kansas City Chiefs	IV	Kansas City Chiefs	

== Modern era (1970–present) ==
The AFL–NFL merger between the two leagues was completed before the 1970 season. The teams were divided between the American Football Conference (AFC) and the National Football Conference (NFC). The two conference playoff champions then played in the Super Bowl to determine the NFL champion.

Season	No. of teams	Regular season			Playoffs			Super Bowl		Ref.
Season	No. of teams	No. of games	AFC top seed	NFC top seed	Postseason	AFC champion	NFC champion	Game	Champion	Ref.
1970	26	14	— (Note: Prior to 1975, there were no official seeds, because the home teams in the playoffs were decided based on a yearly rotation of division winners instead of regular season records.)		1970–71	Baltimore Colts	Dallas Cowboys	V	Baltimore Colts	
1971	26	14	—		1971–72	Miami Dolphins	Dallas Cowboys	VI	Dallas Cowboys	
1972	26	14	—		1972–73	Miami Dolphins	Washington Redskins	VII	Miami Dolphins	
1973	26	14	—		1973–74	Miami Dolphins	Minnesota Vikings	VIII	Miami Dolphins	
1974	26	14	—		1974–75	Pittsburgh Steelers	Minnesota Vikings	IX	Pittsburgh Steelers	
1975	26	14	Pittsburgh Steelers (Note: This conference top seed hosted the third-seeded team in the divisional playoff round rather than the last-seeded wild card team because, prior to 1990, two teams from the same division could not meet during this postseason round.)	Minnesota Vikings (Note: Despite having the same record as the Los Angeles Rams, the Minnesota Vikings clinched the 1975 NFC top seed by winning the point rating system tiebreaker.)	1975–76	Pittsburgh Steelers	Dallas Cowboys	X	Pittsburgh Steelers	
1976	28	14	Oakland Raiders	Minnesota Vikings	1976–77	Oakland Raiders	Minnesota Vikings	XI	Oakland Raiders	
1977	28	14	Denver Broncos	Dallas Cowboys	1977–78	Denver Broncos	Dallas Cowboys	XII	Dallas Cowboys	
1978	28	16	Pittsburgh Steelers	Los Angeles Rams (Note: Despite having the same record as the Dallas Cowboys, the Los Angeles Rams clinched the 1978 NFC top seed by virtue of winning their head-to-head regular season game.)	1978–79	Pittsburgh Steelers	Dallas Cowboys	XIII	Pittsburgh Steelers	
1979	28	16	San Diego Chargers (Note: Despite having the same record as the Pittsburgh Steelers, the San Diego Chargers clinched the 1979 AFC top seed by virtue of winning their head-to-head regular season game.)	Dallas Cowboys (Note: Despite having the same record as the Philadelphia Eagles, the Dallas Cowboys clinched the 1979 NFC top seed by virtue of having a better conference record.)	1979–80	Pittsburgh Steelers	Los Angeles Rams	XIV	Pittsburgh Steelers	
1980	28	16	San Diego Chargers (Note: Despite having the same record as the Buffalo Bills and Cleveland Browns, the San Diego Chargers clinched the 1980 AFC top seed by virtue of having a better conference record.)	Atlanta Falcons (Note: Despite having the same record as the Philadelphia Eagles, the Atlanta Falcons clinched the 1980 NFC top seed by virtue of winning their head-to-head regular season game.)	1980–81	Oakland Raiders	Philadelphia Eagles	XV	Oakland Raiders	
1981	28	16	Cincinnati Bengals	San Francisco 49ers	1981–82	Cincinnati Bengals	San Francisco 49ers	XVI	San Francisco 49ers	
1982	28	9 (Note: A player's strike shortened the 1982 regular season to 9 games, the divisions were temporarily suspended, and eight teams from each conference qualified for a special 16-team playoff tournament.)	Los Angeles Raiders	Washington Redskins	1982–83	Miami Dolphins	Washington Redskins	XVII	Washington Redskins	
1983	28	16	Los Angeles Raiders (Note: Despite having the same record as the Miami Dolphins, the Los Angeles Raiders clinched the 1983 AFC top seed by virtue of winning their head-to-head regular season game.)	Washington Redskins	1983–84	Los Angeles Raiders	Washington Redskins	XVIII	Los Angeles Raiders	
1984	28	16	Miami Dolphins	San Francisco 49ers	1984–85	Miami Dolphins	San Francisco 49ers	XIX	San Francisco 49ers	
1985	28	16	Los Angeles Raiders (Note: Despite having the same record as the Miami Dolphins, the Los Angeles Raiders clinched the 1985 AFC top seed by virtue of having a better record against common opponents.)	Chicago Bears	1985–86	New England Patriots	Chicago Bears	XX	Chicago Bears	
1986	28	16	Cleveland Browns	New York Giants (Note: Despite having the same record as the Chicago Bears, the New York Giants clinched the 1986 NFC top seed by virtue of having a better conference record.)	1986–87	Denver Broncos	New York Giants	XXI	New York Giants	
1987	28	15 (Note: A player's strike shortened the 1987 regular season to 15 games.)	Denver Broncos	San Francisco 49ers	1987–88	Denver Broncos	Washington Redskins	XXII	Washington Redskins	
1988	28	16	Cincinnati Bengals (Note: Despite having the same record as the Buffalo Bills, the Cincinnati Bengals clinched the 1988 AFC top seed by virtue of winning their head-to-head regular season game.)	Chicago Bears	1988–89	Cincinnati Bengals	San Francisco 49ers	XXIII	San Francisco 49ers	
1989	28	16	Denver Broncos	San Francisco 49ers	1989–90	Denver Broncos	San Francisco 49ers	XXIV	San Francisco 49ers	
1990	28	16 (Note: 1990 was the first regular season in which each team was given a bye week.)	Buffalo Bills	San Francisco 49ers	1990–91	Buffalo Bills	New York Giants	XXV	New York Giants	
1991	28	16	Buffalo Bills	Washington Redskins	1991–92	Buffalo Bills	Washington Redskins	XXVI	Washington Redskins	
1992	28	16	Pittsburgh Steelers (Note: Despite having the same record as the Miami Dolphins and San Diego Chargers, the Pittsburgh Steelers clinched the 1992 AFC top seed by virtue of having a better conference record.)	San Francisco 49ers	1992–93	Buffalo Bills	Dallas Cowboys	XXVII	Dallas Cowboys	
1993	28	16 (Note: Each team was given two bye weeks in 1993 instead of one.)	Buffalo Bills (Note: Despite having the same record as the Houston Oilers, the Buffalo Bills clinched the 1993 AFC top seed by virtue of winning their head-to-head regular season game.)	Dallas Cowboys	1993–94	Buffalo Bills	Dallas Cowboys	XXVIII	Dallas Cowboys	
1994	28	16	Pittsburgh Steelers	San Francisco 49ers	1994–95	San Diego Chargers	San Francisco 49ers	XXIX	San Francisco 49ers	
1995	30	16	Kansas City Chiefs	Dallas Cowboys	1995–96	Pittsburgh Steelers	Dallas Cowboys	XXX	Dallas Cowboys	
1996	30	16	Denver Broncos	Green Bay Packers	1996–97	New England Patriots	Green Bay Packers	XXXI	Green Bay Packers	
1997	30	16	Kansas City Chiefs	San Francisco 49ers (Note: Despite having the same record as the Green Bay Packers, the San Francisco 49ers clinched the 1997 NFC top seed by virtue of having a better conference record.)	1997–98	Denver Broncos	Green Bay Packers	XXXII	Denver Broncos	
1998	30	16	Denver Broncos	Minnesota Vikings	1998–99	Denver Broncos	Atlanta Falcons	XXXIII	Denver Broncos	
1999	31	16	Jacksonville Jaguars	St. Louis Rams	1999–2000	Tennessee Titans	St. Louis Rams	XXXIV	St. Louis Rams	
2000	31	16	Tennessee Titans	New York Giants	2000–01	Baltimore Ravens	New York Giants	XXXV	Baltimore Ravens	
2001	31	16 (Note: In the wake of the September 11 attacks in 2001, a number of games were rescheduled.)	Pittsburgh Steelers	St. Louis Rams	2001–02	New England Patriots	St. Louis Rams	XXXVI	New England Patriots	
2002	32	16	Oakland Raiders (Note: Despite having the same record as the Tennessee Titans, the Oakland Raiders clinched the 2002 AFC top seed by virtue of winning their head-to-head regular season game.)	Philadelphia Eagles (Note: Despite having the same record as both the Green Bay Packers and the Tampa Bay Buccaneers, the Philadelphia Eagles clinched the 2002 NFC top seed by virtue of having a better conference record.)	2002–03	Oakland Raiders	Tampa Bay Buccaneers	XXXVII	Tampa Bay Buccaneers	
2003	32	16	New England Patriots	Philadelphia Eagles (Note: Despite having the same record as the St. Louis Rams, the Philadelphia Eagles clinched the 2003 NFC top seed by virtue of having a better conference record.)	2003–04	New England Patriots	Carolina Panthers	XXXVIII	New England Patriots	
2004	32	16	Pittsburgh Steelers	Philadelphia Eagles	2004–05	New England Patriots	Philadelphia Eagles	XXXIX	New England Patriots	
2005	32	16	Indianapolis Colts	Seattle Seahawks	2005–06	Pittsburgh Steelers	Seattle Seahawks	XL	Pittsburgh Steelers	
2006	32	16	San Diego Chargers	Chicago Bears	2006–07	Indianapolis Colts	Chicago Bears	XLI	Indianapolis Colts	
2007	32	16	New England Patriots	Dallas Cowboys (Note: Despite having the same record as the Green Bay Packers, the Dallas Cowboys clinched the 2007 NFC top seed by virtue of winning their head-to-head regular season game.)	2007–08	New England Patriots	New York Giants	XLII	New York Giants	
2008	32	16	Tennessee Titans	New York Giants (Note: Despite having the same record as the Carolina Panthers, the New York Giants clinched the 2008 NFC top seed by virtue of winning their head-to-head regular season game.)	2008–09	Pittsburgh Steelers	Arizona Cardinals	XLIII	Pittsburgh Steelers	
2009	32	16	Indianapolis Colts	New Orleans Saints	2009–10	Indianapolis Colts	New Orleans Saints	XLIV	New Orleans Saints	
2010	32	16	New England Patriots	Atlanta Falcons	2010–11	Pittsburgh Steelers	Green Bay Packers	XLV	Green Bay Packers	
2011	32	16	New England Patriots	Green Bay Packers	2011–12	New England Patriots	New York Giants	XLVI	New York Giants	
2012	32	16	Denver Broncos	Atlanta Falcons	2012–13	Baltimore Ravens	San Francisco 49ers	XLVII	Baltimore Ravens	
2013	32	16	Denver Broncos	Seattle Seahawks	2013–14	Denver Broncos	Seattle Seahawks	XLVIII	Seattle Seahawks	
2014	32	16	New England Patriots (Note: Despite having the same record as the Denver Broncos, the New England Patriots clinched the 2014 AFC top seed by virtue of winning their head-to-head regular season game.)	Seattle Seahawks (Note: Despite having the same record as both the Dallas Cowboys and the Green Bay Packers, the Seattle Seahawks clinched the 2014 NFC top seed by virtue of having a better conference record.)	2014–15	New England Patriots	Seattle Seahawks	XLIX	New England Patriots	
2015	32	16	Denver Broncos (Note: Despite having the same record as both the Cincinnati Bengals and the New England Patriots, the Denver Broncos clinched the 2015 AFC top seed by virtue of winning their head-to-head regular season games against both teams.)	Carolina Panthers	2015–16	Denver Broncos	Carolina Panthers	50 (Note: Game was officially rendered as Super Bowl 50 in Western Arabic numerals instead of "Super Bowl L" in Roman numerals.)	Denver Broncos	
2016	32	16	New England Patriots	Dallas Cowboys	2016–17	New England Patriots	Atlanta Falcons	LI	New England Patriots	
2017	32	16	New England Patriots (Note: Despite having the same record as the Pittsburgh Steelers, the New England Patriots clinched the 2017 AFC top seed by virtue of winning their head-to-head regular season game.)	Philadelphia Eagles (Note: Despite having the same record as the Minnesota Vikings, the Philadelphia Eagles clinched the 2017 NFC top seed by virtue of having a better record against common opponents.)	2017–18	New England Patriots	Philadelphia Eagles	LII	Philadelphia Eagles	
2018	32	16	Kansas City Chiefs (Note: Despite having the same record as the Los Angeles Chargers, the Kansas City Chiefs clinched the 2018 AFC top seed by virtue of having a better division record.)	New Orleans Saints	2018–19	New England Patriots	Los Angeles Rams	LIII	New England Patriots	
2019	32	16	Baltimore Ravens	San Francisco 49ers (Note: Despite having the same record as both the Green Bay Packers and the New Orleans Saints, the San Francisco 49ers clinched the 2019 NFC top seed by virtue of winning their head-to-head regular season games against both teams.)	2019–20	Kansas City Chiefs	San Francisco 49ers	LIV	Kansas City Chiefs	
2020	32	16	Kansas City Chiefs	Green Bay Packers	2020–21	Kansas City Chiefs	Tampa Bay Buccaneers	LV	Tampa Bay Buccaneers	
2021	32	17	Tennessee Titans (Note: Despite having the same record as the Kansas City Chiefs, the Tennessee Titans clinched the 2021 AFC top seed by virtue of winning their head-to-head regular season game.)	Green Bay Packers (Note: Despite having the same record as the Tampa Bay Buccaneers, the Green Bay Packers clinched the 2021 NFC top seed by virtue of having a better conference record.)	2021–22	Cincinnati Bengals	Los Angeles Rams	LVI	Los Angeles Rams	
2022	32	17	Kansas City Chiefs	Philadelphia Eagles	2022–23	Kansas City Chiefs	Philadelphia Eagles	LVII	Kansas City Chiefs	
2023	32	17	Baltimore Ravens	San Francisco 49ers (Note: Despite having the same record as both the Dallas Cowboys and the Detroit Lions, the San Francisco 49ers clinched the 2023 NFC top seed by virtue of having a better conference record.)	2023–24	Kansas City Chiefs	San Francisco 49ers	LVIII	Kansas City Chiefs	
2024	32	17	Kansas City Chiefs	Detroit Lions	2024–25	Kansas City Chiefs	Philadelphia Eagles	LIX	Philadelphia Eagles	
2025	32	17	Denver Broncos (Note: Despite having the same record as the New England Patriots, the Denver Broncos clinched the 2025 AFC top seed by virtue of having a better record against common opponents.)	Seattle Seahawks	2025–26	New England Patriots	Seattle Seahawks	LX	Seattle Seahawks	

== Future seasons ==
Listed below is the current schedule of division matchups for the next few upcoming regular seasons, based on the three-year intraconference and four-year interconference rotations in place since 2021. Each year, in addition to the home and away games against their three division rivals (6 games), all four teams in each division listed at the top will play one game against all four teams in both of the divisions to which it has been assigned — one from the AFC (4 games) and the other from the NFC (4 games). Each team will also play an intraconference game against each of the divisions to which it has not been assigned (2 games), based on the prior season's standings. Finally, each team will also play an additional interconference "17th game" from another division based on the prior season's standings, with the AFC team hosting it in odd years and the NFC team hosting it in even years through 2028; in 2029, the NFC team will begin hosting it in odd years and the AFC team hosting it in even years. This table also lists the sites of the corresponding Super Bowls. For the sites of the regular season games that are planned to be held outside the United States, please refer to the NFL International Series.

Season	Scheduled division matchups									Super Bowl
Season		AFC East	AFC North	AFC South	AFC West	NFC East	NFC North	NFC South	NFC West	Super Bowl
2026	AFC	West	South	North	East	South	East	North	West	Super Bowl LXI; SoFi Stadium; Inglewood, CA
2026	NFC	North	South	East	West	West	South	North	East	Super Bowl LXI; SoFi Stadium; Inglewood, CA
2026	17th Game	at NFC West	at NFC East	at NFC North	at NFC South	AFC North	AFC South	AFC West	AFC East	Super Bowl LXI; SoFi Stadium; Inglewood, CA
2027	AFC	South	West	East	North	East	West	South	North	Super Bowl LXII; Mercedes-Benz Stadium; Atlanta, GA
2027	NFC	East	West	South	North	South	West	East	North	Super Bowl LXII; Mercedes-Benz Stadium; Atlanta, GA
2027	17th Game	NFC South	NFC North	NFC West	NFC East	at AFC West	at AFC North	at AFC East	at AFC South	Super Bowl LXII; Mercedes-Benz Stadium; Atlanta, GA
2028	AFC	North	East	West	South	North	South	West	East	Super Bowl LXIII; Allegiant Stadium; Paradise, Nevada
2028	NFC	West	East	North	South	North	East	West	South	Super Bowl LXIII; Allegiant Stadium; Paradise, Nevada
2028	17th Game	at NFC North	at NFC South	at NFC East	at NFC West	AFC South	AFC East	AFC North	AFC West	Super Bowl LXIII; Allegiant Stadium; Paradise, Nevada
2029	AFC	West	South	North	East	West	North	East	South	Super Bowl LXIV; New Nissan Stadium; Nashville, Tennessee
2029	NFC	South	North	West	East	West	South	North	East	Super Bowl LXIV; New Nissan Stadium; Nashville, Tennessee
2029	17th game (Note: In 2029, the NFC team will begin hosting the 17th game in odd years and the AFC team hosting it in even years.)	at NFC East	at NFC West	at NFC South	at NFC North	AFC East	AFC West	AFC South	AFC North	Super Bowl LXIV; New Nissan Stadium; Nashville, Tennessee

== See also ==
- Lists of NFL team seasons
- Timeline of the National Football League
- American Football League (1926) (AFL I)
  - 1926 American Football League season
- American Football League (1936) (AFL II)
  - 1936 American Football League season
  - 1937 American Football League season
- American Football League (1940) (AFL III)
  - 1940 American Football League season
  - 1941 American Football League season
- All-America Football Conference (AAFC)
  - 1946 AAFC season
  - 1947 AAFC season
  - 1948 AAFC season
  - 1949 AAFC season
  - AAFC–NFL merger
- Ohio League
- New York Pro Football League
- Western Pennsylvania Professional Football Circuit
- Anthracite League
- Midwest Football League (1935–1940)
