= Super Bowl =

National Football League championship game

- Generic logo, used from 2010 to 2015
- First played: January 15, 1967 (59 years ago)
- Trophy: Vince Lombardi Trophy

2026 season
- Super Bowl LXI; SoFi Stadium; Inglewood, California; February 14, 2027

The Super Bowl is the league championship final game of the National Football League (NFL) of the United States. It has served as the final game of every NFL season since 1966 replacing the NFL Championship Game and also served as the final game of every American Football League season from 1966 to 1967 prior to the AFL–NFL merger replacing the AFL championship game. Since 2022, the game has been played on the second Sunday in February. Prior Super Bowls were played on Sundays in early to mid-January from 1967 to 1978, late January from 1979 to 2003, (Note: Except 2002's Super Bowl XXXVI, which was moved to the first Sunday of February following the September 11 attacks.) (Note: From 1990 to 2001, and 2003, the game was held on the last Sunday in January.) and the first Sunday of February from 2004 to 2021. Winning teams are awarded the Vince Lombardi Trophy, named after the coach who won the first two Super Bowls. Because the NFL restricts the use of its "Super Bowl" trademark, it is frequently referred to as the "big game" or other generic terms by non-sponsoring corporations. The day the game is held is commonly referred to as "Super Bowl Sunday" or "Super Sunday".

The game was established as part of a 1966 merger agreement between the NFL and the competing American Football League (AFL) to have their best teams compete for a championship. It was originally called the AFL–NFL World Championship Game until the "Super Bowl" moniker was adopted in 1969's Super Bowl III. The first four Super Bowls from 1967 to 1970 were played before the merger, with the NFL and AFL each winning two. After the merger in 1970, the 10 AFL teams and three NFL teams formed the American Football Conference (AFC) and the remaining 13 NFL teams formed the National Football Conference (NFC). Treating the pre-merger NFL and AFL as equivalent to the post-merger NFC and AFC, the NFC leads the AFC in total Super Bowl victories 29–27 or 31–29.

Among the NFL's current 32 teams, 20 (11 NFC, 9 AFC) have won a Super Bowl and 17 (8 AFC, 9 NFC) hold multiple titles. The AFC's Pittsburgh Steelers and New England Patriots have the most Super Bowl titles at six each. The Patriots also have the most Super Bowl appearances at 12, and the most Super Bowl losses at six. The Baltimore Ravens of the AFC and the Tampa Bay Buccaneers of the NFC are the only franchises to be undefeated in multiple Super Bowls, having each won two. Among the 12 teams who have not won a Super Bowl, the NFC's Detroit Lions and the AFC's Jacksonville Jaguars, Houston Texans, and Cleveland Browns are the only four to have not appeared in the game.

The Super Bowl is among the top-ten world's most-watched sporting events and frequently commands the largest audience among all American broadcasts during the year. Its viewership is bested by the UEFA Champions League final, FIFA World Cup, Tour de France, Cricket World Cup, FIFA Women's World Cup, Summer Olympic Games, and the Winter Olympic games as the most watched sporting event worldwide, and the seven most-watched broadcasts in American television history are Super Bowls. Its halftime shows feature top artists, the most recent of which being Bad Bunny. Headlining a Super Bowl is considered one of the highest honors in music. Commercial airtime during the Super Bowl broadcast is the most expensive of the year because of the high viewership, leading to companies regularly developing their most unique advertisements for the broadcast and commercial viewership becoming an integral part of the event. The Super Bowl is also the second-largest event for American food consumption, behind Thanksgiving dinner.

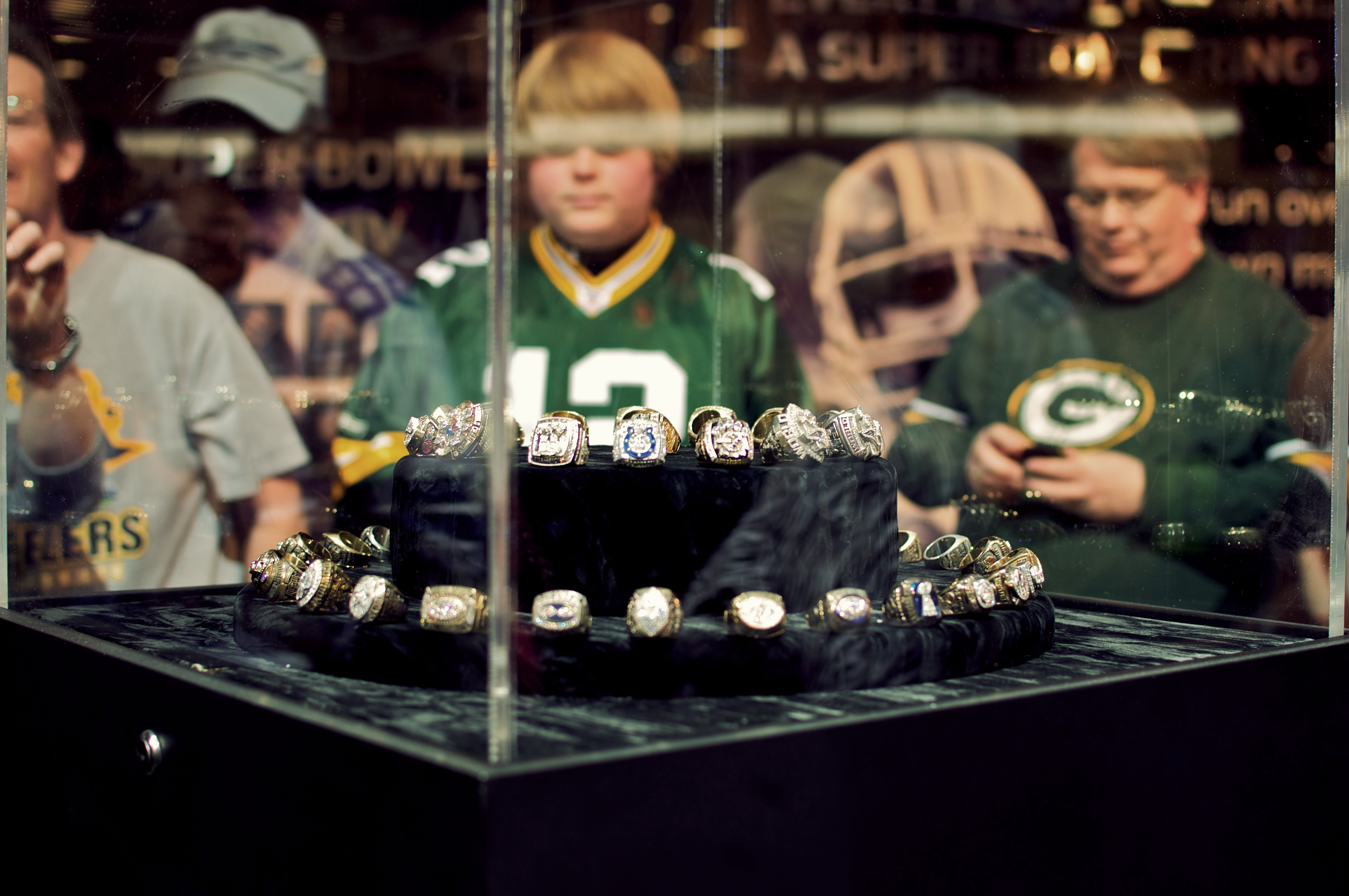
Each winning team's Super Bowl rings, as of the 2010 season, on display in lead up to Super Bowl XLV

== Origin ==
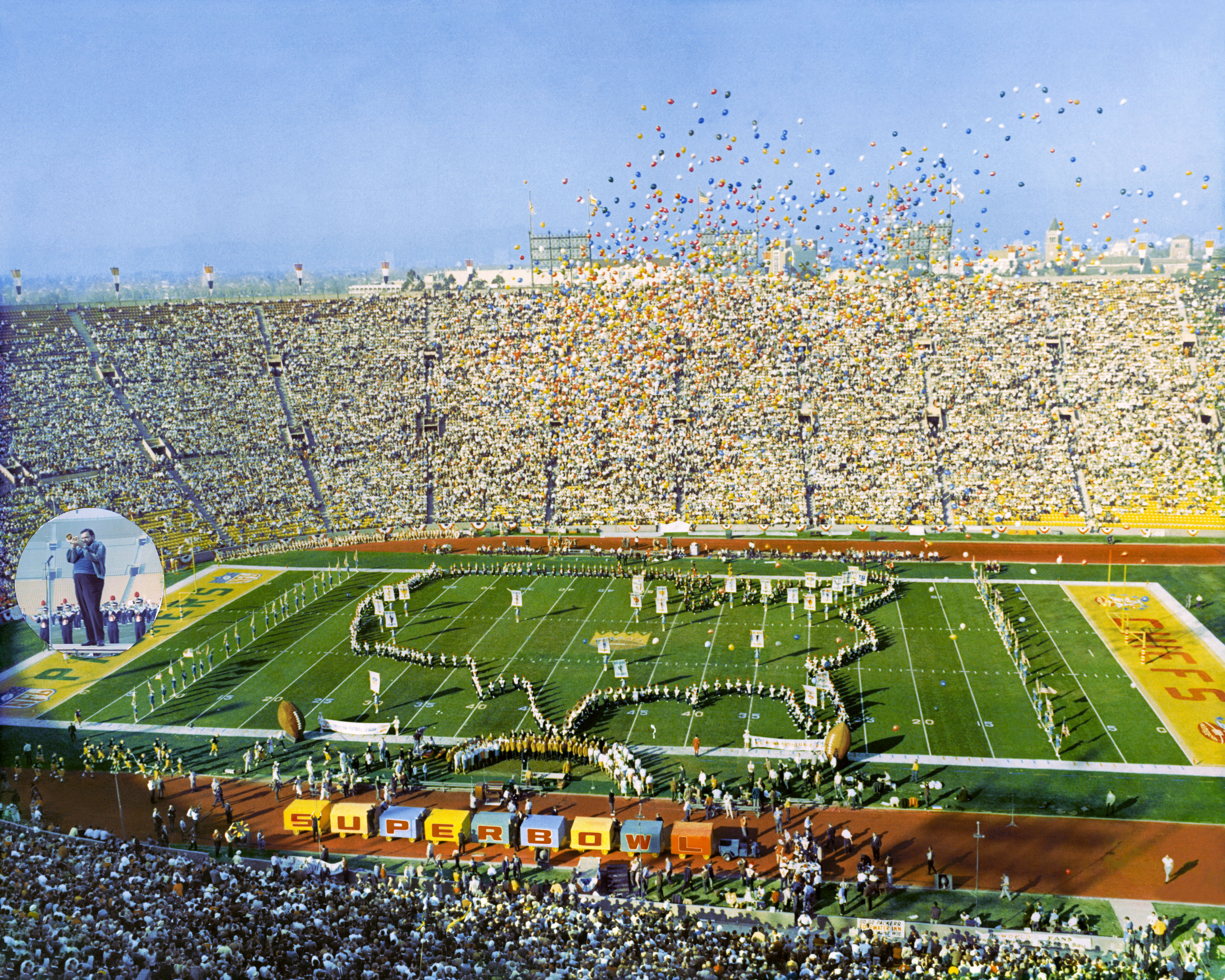
The first Super Bowl at Los Angeles Memorial Coliseum

Since the turn of the 20th century, college football teams from across the United States have scheduled "bowl games" against each other. The original "bowl game" was the Rose Bowl Game in Pasadena, California, which was first played in 1902 as the "Tournament East–West football game" as part of the Pasadena Tournament of Roses. In 1923, the Tournament East-West football game moved to the new Rose Bowl Stadium; the stadium got its name from the fact that the game played there was part of the Tournament of Roses and that it was shaped like a bowl, much like the Yale Bowl in New Haven, Connecticut. The Tournament of Roses football game thus eventually came to be known as the Rose Bowl Game. Exploiting the Rose Bowl Game's popularity, post-season college football contests were created for Miami (the Orange Bowl), New Orleans (the Sugar Bowl), and El Paso (the Sun Bowl) in 1935, and for Dallas (the Cotton Bowl) in 1937. By the time the first Super Bowl was played, the term "bowl" for any major American football game was well established.

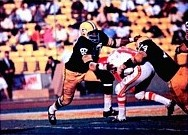
The Packers defeated the Chiefs in the first Super Bowl.

For four decades after its 1920 inception, the NFL successfully fended off several rival leagues. In 1960, it encountered its most serious competitor when the American Football League (AFL) was formed. The AFL vied with the NFL for players and fans. After the AFL's inaugural season, AFL commissioner Joe Foss sent an invitation to the NFL on January 14, 1961, to schedule a "World Playoff" game between the two leagues' champions, beginning with the upcoming 1961 season. The first World Playoff game, if actually played, would have matched up the AFL champion Houston Oilers against the NFL champion Green Bay Packers.

In the mid-1960s, Lamar Hunt, owner of the AFL's Kansas City Chiefs, first used the term "Super Bowl" to refer to the AFL–NFL championship game in the merger meetings. Hunt later said the name was likely in his head because his children had been playing with a Super Ball toy; a vintage example of the ball is on display at the Pro Football Hall of Fame in Canton, Ohio. In a July 25, 1966, letter to NFL commissioner Pete Rozelle, Hunt wrote, "I have kiddingly called it the 'Super Bowl,' which obviously can be improved upon."

The leagues' owners chose the name "AFL–NFL Championship Game", but in July 1966 the Kansas City Star quoted Hunt in discussing "the Super Bowl—that's my term for the championship game between the two leagues", and the media immediately began using the term. Green Bay safety Tom Brown used the name leading up to the first championship game: "I would guess you can't get any bigger in professional football than to play in the first Super Bowl game". In May 1967, The league stated that "not many people like it. It's a bad play on words. Everything became super this and super that". Rozelle was asking for suggestions, and early contenders included "Merger Bowl", "Summit Bowl", and "The Game". The Associated Press reported that "Super Bowl" "grew and grew and grew—until it reached the point that there was Super Week, Super Sunday, Super Teams, Super Players, ad infinitum". "Super Bowl" became official beginning with the third annual game.

Roman numerals are used to identify each Super Bowl, rather than the year in which it is held, since the fifth edition, in January 1971. The sole exception to this naming convention tradition occurred with Super Bowl 50, played on February 7, 2016, following the 2015 season. The following year, the nomenclature returned to Roman numerals for Super Bowl LI.

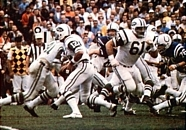
The New York Jets were the first AFL team to win a Super Bowl (III), upsetting the Baltimore Colts

After the NFL's Green Bay Packers won the first two Super Bowls, some team owners feared for the future of the merger. At the time, many doubted the competitiveness of AFL teams compared with their NFL counterparts, though that perception changed when the AFL's New York Jets defeated the heavily favored NFL contender Baltimore Colts in Super Bowl III in Miami. One year later, the AFL's Kansas City Chiefs defeated the NFL's Minnesota Vikings 23–7 in Super Bowl IV in New Orleans, which was the final AFL–NFL World Championship Game played before the merger. Beginning with the 1970 season, the NFL realigned into two conferences; the former AFL teams plus three NFL teams (the Baltimore Colts, Pittsburgh Steelers, and Cleveland Browns) would constitute the American Football Conference (AFC), while the remaining NFL clubs would form the National Football Conference (NFC). The champions of the two conferences would play each other in the Super Bowl.

The winning team receives the Vince Lombardi Trophy, named after the former coach of the Green Bay Packers, who won the first two Super Bowl games as well as five NFL championships preceding the merger (1961, 1962, 1965, 1966, 1967). Following Lombardi's death in September 1970, the trophy was named after him. The first trophy awarded under the new name was presented to the Baltimore Colts following their win in Super Bowl V in Miami.

== Game history ==
The Super Bowl was held in January from its inception in 1967 until 2001. In 2002, a week of regular season games was postponed and rescheduled following the September 11 attacks; as a result, Super Bowl XXXVI became the first edition of the game played in February. Super Bowl XXXVII was held in January, but all subsequent games were held on the first Sunday in February until the schedule expansion of the 2021 season moved the game to the second Sunday.

The current NFL schedule begins on the weekend immediately after Labor Day (the first Monday in September). That weekend is the first of an 18-week regular season, followed by three weeks of playoff games and one week for the Pro Bowl. The Super Bowl is contested the week after the Pro Bowl. This schedule has been in effect since an 18th week and 17th regular season game were added to the NFL schedule for the 2021 season, with Super Bowl LVI on February 13, 2022, the first to be played under this format.

The Pittsburgh Steelers and New England Patriots are tied with a record six Super Bowl wins. The Dallas Cowboys and San Francisco 49ers have five victories each, while the Packers, Chiefs and New York Giants have four. Fourteen other NFL franchises have won at least one Super Bowl.

The Patriots own the record for most Super Bowl appearances with twelve. The Cowboys, Steelers, Broncos and the 49ers are tied for second with eight appearances apiece, reaching that milestone in this respective order. Bill Belichick owns the record for the most Super Bowl wins (eight) and appearances (twelve: nine times as head coach, once as assistant head coach, and twice as defensive coordinator) by an individual. Tom Brady has the most Super Bowl starts (ten) and wins as a player (seven), while Charles Haley has the second-most wins among players with five.

Eight teams have appeared in Super Bowl games without a win. The Minnesota Vikings were the first team to appear four times without a win, while the Buffalo Bills played in a record four consecutive Super Bowls, losing all four matches. The Patriots have the most Super Bowl losses at six.

The Cleveland Browns, Detroit Lions, Houston Texans, and Jacksonville Jaguars are the four teams to have never appeared in a Super Bowl, although the Browns and Lions both won NFL championships before the Super Bowl era. The Jaguars, who began play in 1995, and the Texans, who began play in 2002, are among the youngest franchises in the league.

=== 1960s: Early history and Packers dominance ===
The Packers won the first two AFL–NFL World Championship Games, later renamed Super Bowls, defeating the Kansas City Chiefs and Oakland Raiders following the 1966 and 1967 seasons, respectively. The Packers were led by quarterback Bart Starr, who was named the Most Valuable Player (MVP) for both games. These two championships, coupled with the Packers' NFL championships in 1961, 1962, and 1965, amount to the most successful stretch in NFL History; five championships in seven years, and the second threepeat in NFL history (1965, 1966, and 1967). The Packers are the only team to threepeat, as they also accomplished the feat in the pre-playoff era (1929, 1930 and 1931). The first playoff game in the NFL was in 1932.

In Super Bowl III, the AFL's New York Jets defeated the 19.5-point favorite Baltimore Colts of the NFL, 16–7. The Jets were led by quarterback Joe Namath, who had said that he guaranteed a Jets win before the game, and former Colts head coach Weeb Ewbank, and their victory demonstrated that the AFL was competitive with the NFL. This was reinforced the following year when the Chiefs defeated the NFL's Vikings 23–7 in Super Bowl IV.

=== 1970s: Dominant franchises ===
After the AFL–NFL merger was completed in 1970, three franchises—the Cowboys, Miami Dolphins, and Steelers—would go on to dominate the 1970s, winning a combined eight Super Bowls between them in the decade, with the Steelers winning four of the eight.

The Baltimore Colts, now a member of the AFC, would start the decade by defeating the Cowboys in Super Bowl V, a game which is the only Super Bowl to date in which a player from the losing team won the Super Bowl MVP (Cowboys' linebacker Chuck Howley). Beginning with this Super Bowl, all Super Bowls have served as the NFL's championship game.

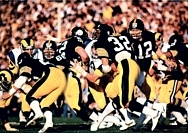
The Steelers defeated the Rams in Super Bowl XIV to win an unprecedented four championships in six years.

The Cowboys, coming back from a loss the previous season, won Super Bowl VI over the Dolphins. However, this would be the Dolphins' final loss for over a year, as the next year, the Dolphins would go 14–0 in the regular season and eventually win all their playoff games, capped off with a 14–7 victory in Super Bowl VII, becoming the first and only team in the Super Bowl era to finish an entire perfect regular and postseason undefeated. The Dolphins would repeat as league champions by winning Super Bowl VIII a year later with a 24–7 win over the Minnesota Vikings.

In the mid to late 1970s, the Steelers became the first NFL dynasty of the post-merger era by winning four Super Bowls (IX, X, XIII, and XIV) in six years. They were led by head coach Chuck Noll, the play of offensive stars Terry Bradshaw, Franco Harris, Lynn Swann, John Stallworth, and Mike Webster, and their dominant "Steel Curtain" defense, led by "Mean" Joe Greene, L. C. Greenwood, Ernie Holmes, Mel Blount, Jack Ham, and Jack Lambert. Many of the team's key players were selected in the 1974 draft, in which Pittsburgh selected four future Hall of Famers, the most for any team in any sport in a single draft. A fifth player, Donnie Shell, was signed by Pittsburgh after going unselected in the 1974 NFL draft; he too was later enshrined in the Hall of Fame. The Steelers were the first team to win three and then four Super Bowls and appeared in six AFC Championship Games during the decade, making the playoffs in eight straight seasons. Pittsburgh still remains the only team to win back-to-back Super Bowls twice and four Super Bowls in a six-year period.

The Steelers' 1970s dynasty was interrupted only by the Raiders' first Super Bowl win in Super Bowl XI and the Cowboys' second Super Bowl win in Super Bowl XII. Conversely, the Vikings, with their Purple People Eaters defense, were the only other team to appear in multiple Super Bowls (IV, VIII, IX and XI) during the decade but failed to win each one.

=== 1980s and 1990s: The NFC's winning streak ===
In the 1980s and 1990s, the tables turned for the AFC, as the NFC dominated the Super Bowls of the new decade and most of those in the 1990s. The NFC won 16 of the 20 Super Bowls during these two decades, including 13 straight from Super Bowl XIX to Super Bowl XXXI.

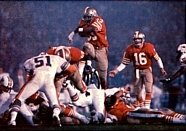
The 49ers against the Dolphins in Super Bowl XIX

The most successful team of the 1980s was the 49ers, which featured the West Coast offense of Hall of Fame head coach Bill Walsh. This offense was led by three-time Super Bowl MVP and Hall of Fame quarterback Joe Montana, Super Bowl MVP and Hall of Fame wide receiver Jerry Rice, Hall of Fame running back Roger Craig, and Hall of Fame defensive safety/cornerback Ronnie Lott. Under their leadership, the 49ers won four Super Bowls in the decade (XVI, XIX, XXIII, and XXIV) and made nine playoff appearances between 1981 and 1990, including eight division championships, becoming the second dynasty of the post-merger NFL. The 1984 San Francisco 49ers were the first team to achieve an 18–1 record, doing so under Walsh. The 1989 San Francisco 49ers, under first-year head coach George Seifert, posted the most lop-sided victory in Super Bowl history, defeating the Denver Broncos by a score of 55–10 in Super Bowl XXIV.

The 1980s also produced the 1985 Chicago Bears, who posted an 18–1 record under head coach Mike Ditka; quarterback Jim McMahon; and Hall of Fame running back Walter Payton. Their team won Super Bowl XX in dominant fashion. The Washington Redskins and New York Giants were also top teams of this period; Washington won Super Bowls XVII, XXII, and XXVI. The Giants claimed Super Bowls XXI and XXV. Both teams won multiple Super Bowls with different starting quarterbacks; Washington won with Joe Theismann (XVII), Doug Williams (XXII) and Mark Rypien (XXVI), and the Giants with Phil Simms (XXI) and Jeff Hostetler (XXV). As in the 1970s, the Raiders were the only AFC team to interrupt the Super Bowl dominance of NFC teams; they won Super Bowls XV and XVIII (the latter as the Los Angeles Raiders).

Conversely, the Cincinnati Bengals (XVI and XXIII), Dolphins, (XVII and XIX), and Broncos (XXI, XXII and XXIV) made multiple Super Bowls in the 1980s without winning one.

Following several seasons with poor records in the 1980s, the Cowboys rose back to prominence in the 1990s. During this decade, the Cowboys made post-season appearances every year except for the seasons of 1990 and 1997. From 1992 to 1996, the Cowboys won their division championship each year. In this same period, the Buffalo Bills reached the Super Bowl for a record four consecutive years, but lost all four (XXV-XXVIII). After Super Bowl championships by division rivals New York (1990) and Washington (1991), the Cowboys won three of the next four Super Bowls (XXVII, XXVIII, and XXX) led by quarterback Troy Aikman, running back Emmitt Smith, and wide receiver Michael Irvin. All three of these players went to the Hall of Fame. The Cowboys' streak was interrupted by the 49ers, who were the first team to win their league-leading fifth title overall with Super Bowl XXIX with a dominant performance featuring the Super Bowl MVP and Hall of Fame quarterback Steve Young (who threw a Super Bowl record 6 touchdown passes), Hall of Fame wide receiver Jerry Rice, and Hall of Fame cornerback Deion Sanders; however, the Cowboys' victory in Super Bowl XXX the next year also gave them five titles overall and they did so with Sanders after he won the Super Bowl the previous year with the 49ers. The NFC's winning streak was continued by the Packers led by Hall of Fame quarterback Brett Favre, won Super Bowl XXXI, their first championship since Super Bowl II in 1967.

The Patriots made their maiden Super Bowl appearances in XX (1985) and XXXI (1996) but lost both times. However, the turn of the century would soon bring hope and glory to the franchise.

=== 2000s: AFC resurgence and the rise of the Patriots ===
Super Bowl XXXII saw quarterback John Elway and running back Terrell Davis lead the Denver Broncos to an upset victory over the defending champion Packers, snapping the NFC's thirteen-year winning streak. The following year, the Broncos defeated the Atlanta Falcons in Super Bowl XXXIII, Elway's fifth Super Bowl appearance, his second NFL championship, and his final NFL game. The back-to-back victories heralded a change in momentum in which AFC teams would win nine out of 12 Super Bowls. In the years between 1995 and 2018, five teams—the Steelers, Patriots, Broncos, Baltimore Ravens, and Indianapolis Colts—accounted for 22 of the 24 AFC Super Bowl appearances (including the last 16), with those same teams often meeting each other earlier in the playoffs. In contrast, the NFC saw a different representative in the Super Bowl every season from 2001 through 2010.

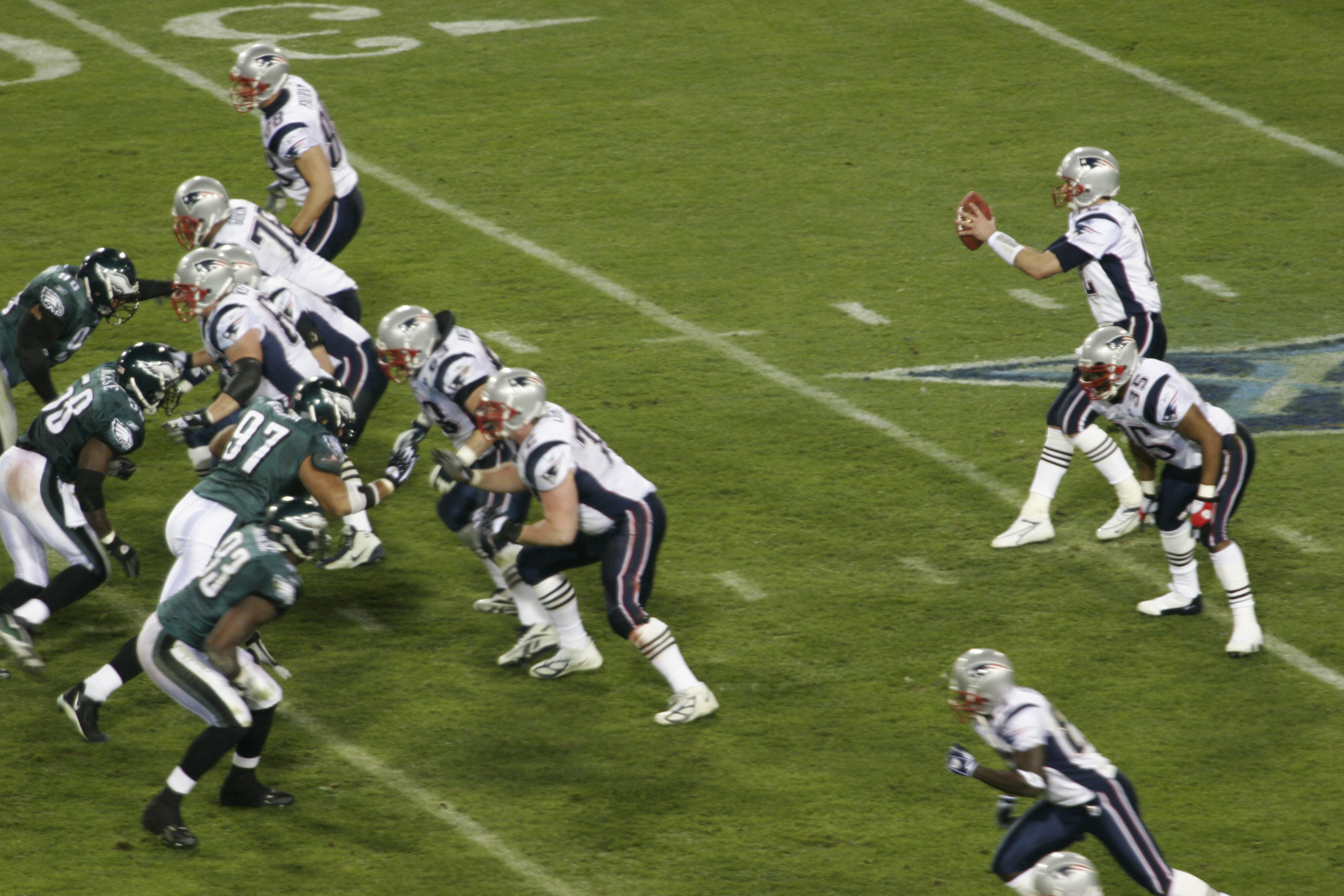
The Patriots playing against the Eagles in Super Bowl XXXIX

The New England Patriots became the dominant team throughout the early 2000s, winning the championship three out of four years early in the decade. They would become only the second team in the history of the NFL to do so (after the 1990s Dallas Cowboys). In Super Bowl XXXVI, first-year starting quarterback Tom Brady led his team to a 20–17 upset victory over the St. Louis Rams, who two seasons earlier won Super Bowl XXXIV. Brady would go on to win the MVP award for this game. The Patriots also won Super Bowls XXXVIII and XXXIX defeating the Carolina Panthers and the Philadelphia Eagles respectively. This four-year stretch of Patriot dominance was interrupted by the Tampa Bay Buccaneers' 48–21 Super Bowl XXXVII victory over the Oakland Raiders.

The Steelers and Colts continued the era of AFC dominance by winning Super Bowls XL and XLI in the 2005 and 2006 seasons, respectively defeating the Seattle Seahawks and Chicago Bears.

In the 2007 season, the Patriots became the fourth team in NFL history to have a perfect unbeaten and untied regular-season record, the second in the Super Bowl era after the 1972 Miami Dolphins, and the first to finish 16–0. They easily marched through the AFC playoffs and were heavy favorites in Super Bowl XLII. However, they lost that game to Eli Manning and the New York Giants 17–14, leaving the Patriots' 2007 record at 18–1.

The following season, the Steelers logged their record sixth Super Bowl title (XLIII) in a 27–23, final-minute victory against the Arizona Cardinals.

The 2009 season saw the New Orleans Saints defeat the Indianapolis Colts in Super Bowl XLIV by a score of 31–17 to take home their first championship. With this victory, the Saints joined the New York Jets as the only teams to have won in their sole Super Bowl appearance, a distinction the Ravens also enjoyed in winning Super Bowl XXXV after the 2000 season and the Buccaneers in 2002.

=== 2010s: Patriots reign; parity in the NFC ===
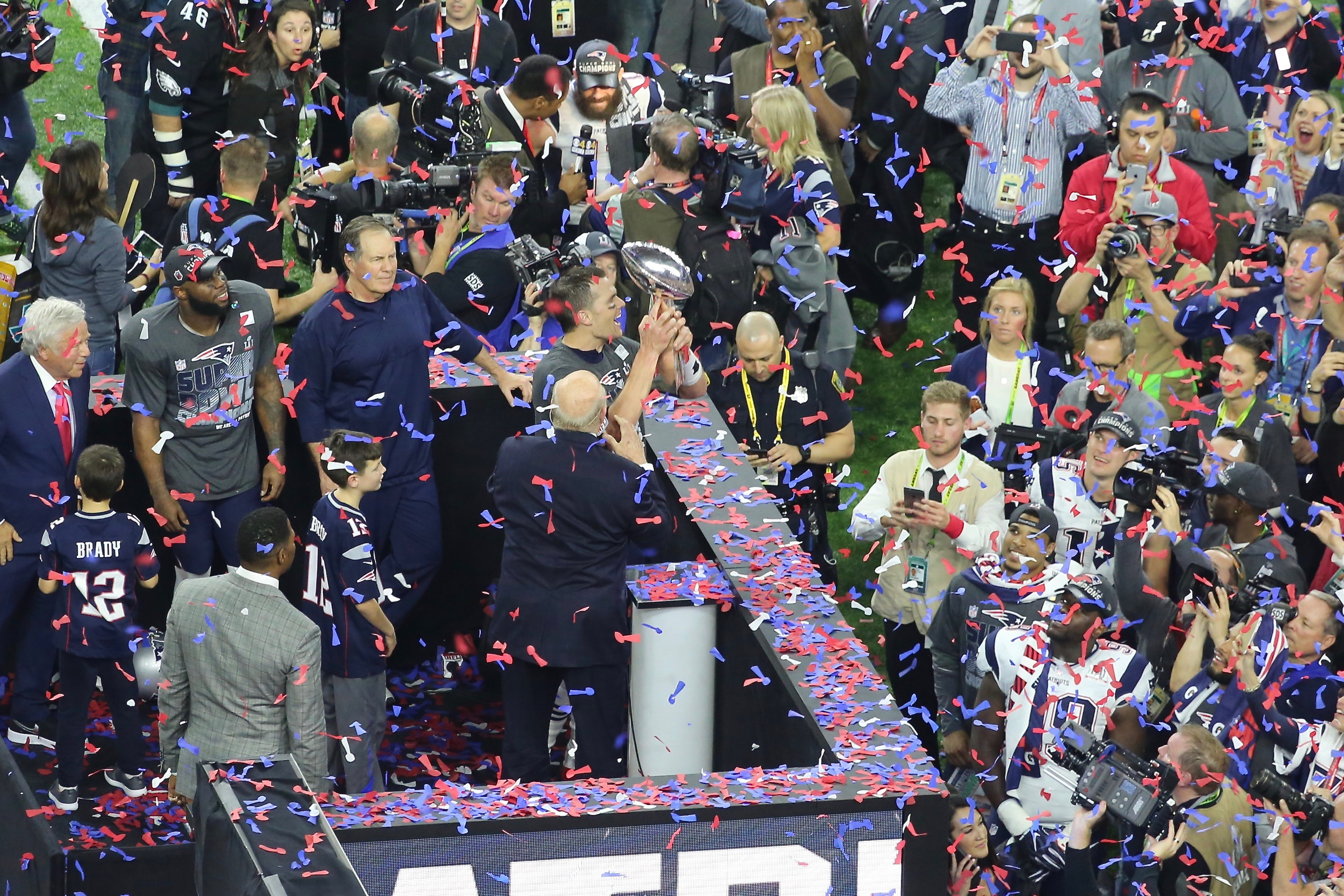
The New England Patriots postgame speech after Super Bowl LI, February 5, 2017

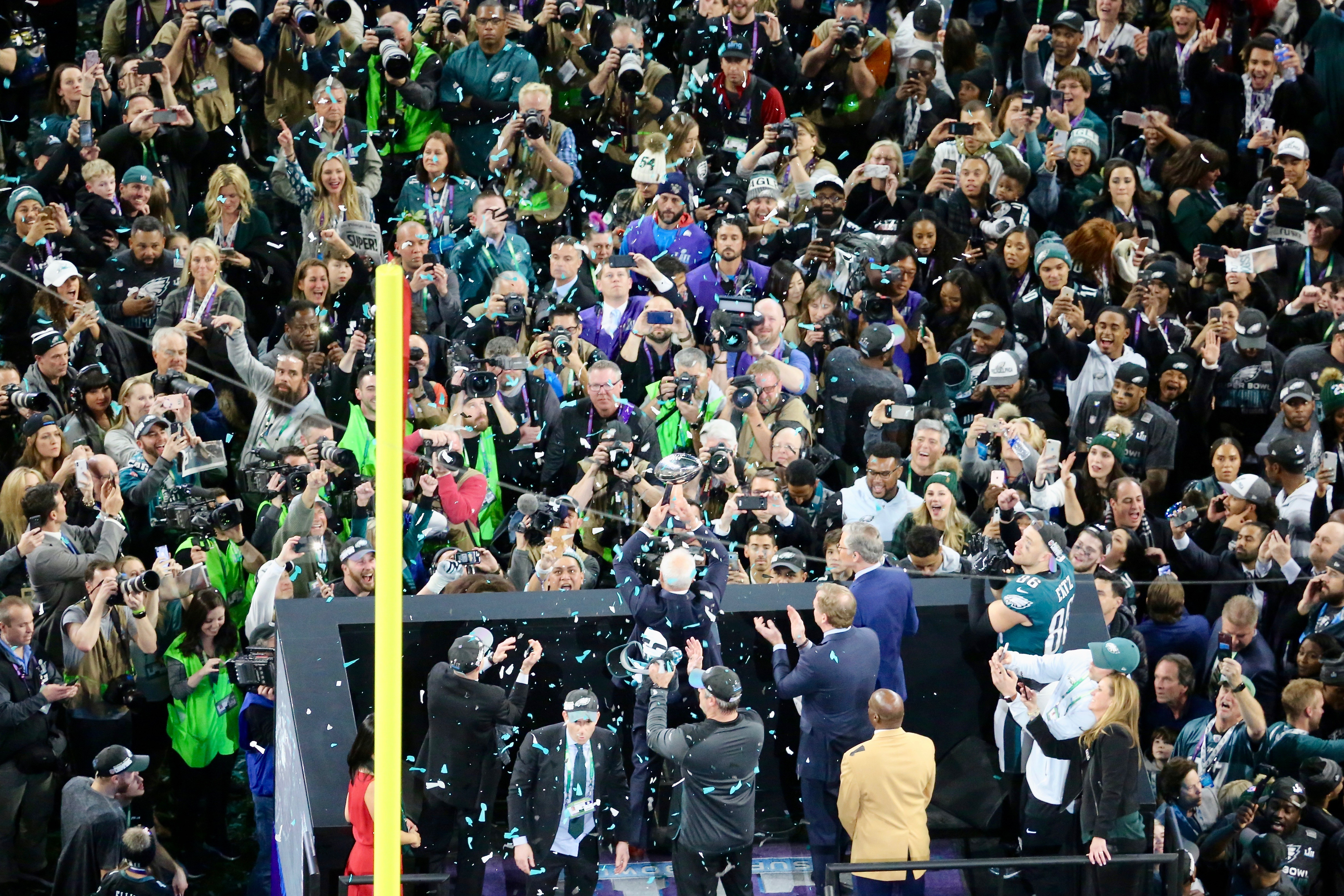
The Philadelphia Eagles are presented with the Vince Lombardi Trophy after winning Super Bowl LII, February 4, 2018.

In the AFC, this era was dominated by the Patriots, with the only four other teams to represent the conference being the Steelers, Ravens, Broncos, and Chiefs. The Patriots had tied a record with the 1970s Dallas Cowboys for most Super Bowl appearances in a decade with five appearances (2011, 2014, 2016, 2017, 2018). The Patriots also had four Super Bowl appearances in five years. They also had eight consecutive AFC championship appearances spanning 2011–2018.

The Super Bowls of the 2000s and 2010s saw strong performances from several of the participating quarterbacks, especially on the AFC side with repeated appearances by the same teams and players. In particular, Tom Brady, Ben Roethlisberger, or Peyton Manning appeared as the AFC team's quarterback in all but two of the Super Bowls from 2001 through 2018. Conversely, the only NFC teams to make the Super Bowl multiple times with the same quarterback in this era were the Seahawks, led by quarterback Russell Wilson, and the Giants, led by quarterback Eli Manning.

One of these teams was featured in the culmination of the 2010 season, Super Bowl XLV, which brought the Packers their fourth Super Bowl victory and record thirteenth NFL championship overall with the defeat of the Steelers in February 2011. This became Aaron Rodgers' only Super Bowl victory.

The following year, in Super Bowl XLVI, the Patriots made their first appearance of the decade, a position where they would become a mainstay. The Patriots, however, lost to the Eli Manning-led Giants, 21–17, who had beaten the Patriots four years before. This was the Giants' fourth Super Bowl victory.

In Super Bowl XLVII, the NFC's 49ers were defeated by the Ravens 34–31. The game had been dubbed as the 'Harbaugh Bowl' in the weeks leading up to the game, due to the fact that the coaches of the two teams, John Harbaugh and Jim Harbaugh, are brothers. During the third quarter, the Ravens had a commanding 28–6 lead. However, there was a blackout in New Orleans, where the game was being played. The game was delayed for 34 minutes, and after play resumed, San Francisco stormed back with 17 straight points, but still lost.

Super Bowl XLVIII, played at New Jersey's MetLife Stadium in February 2014, was the first Super Bowl held outdoors in a cold-weather environment. The Seahawks won their first NFL title with a 43–8 defeat of the Broncos, in a highly touted matchup that pitted Seattle's top-ranked defense against a Peyton Manning-led Denver offense that had broken the NFL's single-season scoring record.

In Super Bowl XLIX, the Patriots beat the defending Super Bowl champions, the Seahawks, by a score of 28–24. Down by 10, the Patriots mounted a late fourth quarter comeback to win the game with Tom Brady scoring two touchdowns in the fourth quarter. In a key play in the final seconds of the game, then-rookie free agent Malcolm Butler would intercept a pass by Russell Wilson at the one-yard line, allowing the Patriots to run out the clock and end the game. Tom Brady was awarded his third Super Bowl MVP, tying Joe Montana for the most Super Bowl MVP awards.

In Super Bowl 50, the first Super Bowl to be branded with Arabic numerals, the Broncos, led by the league's top-ranked defense, defeated the Panthers, who had the league's top-ranked offense, in what became the final game of quarterback Peyton Manning's career. Von Miller dominated, totaling 2.5 sacks and forcing two Cam Newton fumbles; both fumbles leading to Broncos touchdowns.

In Super Bowl LI, the first Super Bowl to end in overtime, the Atlanta Falcons led 28–3 late in the third quarter, but the Patriots came back to tie the game 28–28 with back-to-back touchdowns and two-point conversions, and the Patriots went on to win 34–28 in overtime. This 25-point deficit was the largest comeback win for any team in a Super Bowl, breaking the previous of a 10-point deficit to come back and win. The Patriots never held the lead until the game-winning touchdown in overtime. It was Tom Brady's 5th Super Bowl win and he was awarded his record fourth Super Bowl MVP, throwing a then-record 466 yards for 43 completions.

In Super Bowl LII, the Philadelphia Eagles defeated the defending champion Patriots 41–33, ending a 57-year championship drought for the franchise. Nick Foles won the Super Bowl MVP. The Patriots totaled 613 yards in defeat, with Tom Brady breaking his previous Super Bowl record of 466 passing yards with an all-time playoff record of 505 passing yards in the high-scoring game; while the Eagles would gain 538 yards in the victory. The combined total for both teams of 1,151 yards of offense broke an NFL record (for any game) that had stood for nearly seven decades. The Patriots' 33 points were the highest losing score in Super Bowl history, a record held until 2023, when the Eagles lost Super Bowl LVII to the Kansas City Chiefs by a score of 38–35. It was the Eagles' third Super Bowl appearance and their first win in franchise history. With the Eagles' victory, the NFC East became the first division to have each team win at least one Super Bowl.

While Super Bowl LII produced the second highest-scoring Super Bowl, the following year's Super Bowl LIII became the lowest-scoring Super Bowl. The Patriots defeated the Los Angeles Rams, 13–3. In so doing, they became the team with the lowest point total by a winning team in Super Bowl history. Tom Brady would receive a record sixth Super Bowl championship, the most of any player in NFL history, surpassing his tie with Charles Haley for five wins. Brady would also become the oldest player to ever win a Super Bowl at age 41, while Bill Belichick would be the oldest coach to ever win a Super Bowl at age 66. Wide receiver Julian Edelman was named Super Bowl MVP.

=== 2020s: Beginning of the Chiefs' dominance ===
In Super Bowl LIV, the Chiefs defeated the 49ers in a comeback, 31–20, for their first Super Bowl title in 50 years. This victory marked the first time since 1991 that the NFC did not have more Super Bowl victories than the AFC. The Patriots were absent; after making it to the Super Bowl in each of the last three years and winning two of them, they had lost in the Wild Card round of the playoffs to the Tennessee Titans 20–13. That game represented Tom Brady's final game as a New England Patriot.

In Super Bowl LV, which took place in Tampa, Florida, the Tampa Bay Buccaneers defeated the defending champion Chiefs, 31–9. No player on the Buccaneers who scored points (Rob Gronkowski, Antonio Brown, Leonard Fournette, and Ryan Succop) was on the Buccaneers' roster the previous season. This marked a record seventh Super Bowl victory for Tom Brady, also more than any individual NFL franchise, and who would also break his own record for the oldest quarterback to win a championship at 43 years old. Tampa Bay head coach Bruce Arians would also break Bill Belichick's record for the oldest head coach to win a championship at 68. Super Bowl LV also marked the first time in the history of the modern league that a host city's professional football franchise got to play in a Super Bowl that was hosted in their home stadium.

A year later in Inglewood, California, the Los Angeles Rams defeated the Cincinnati Bengals 23–20 to win Super Bowl LVI, becoming the second team to win the Super Bowl in its home stadium.

On February 12, 2023, at State Farm Stadium in Glendale, Arizona, the Chiefs overcame a 10-point deficit at halftime to defeat the Philadelphia Eagles 38–35, winning Super Bowl LVII on a last-minute field goal.

On February 11, 2024, the Chiefs won Super Bowl LVIII at Allegiant Stadium on an overtime touchdown. The first Super Bowl in Las Vegas, this was a rematch of Super Bowl LIV between the 49ers and the Chiefs, and was the Chiefs' fourth Super Bowl appearance in five years. The second Super Bowl to go into overtime, the Chiefs came back from another 10-point deficit to win their third Super Bowl in five years and secure back-to-back championships for the first time since the 2004 New England Patriots.

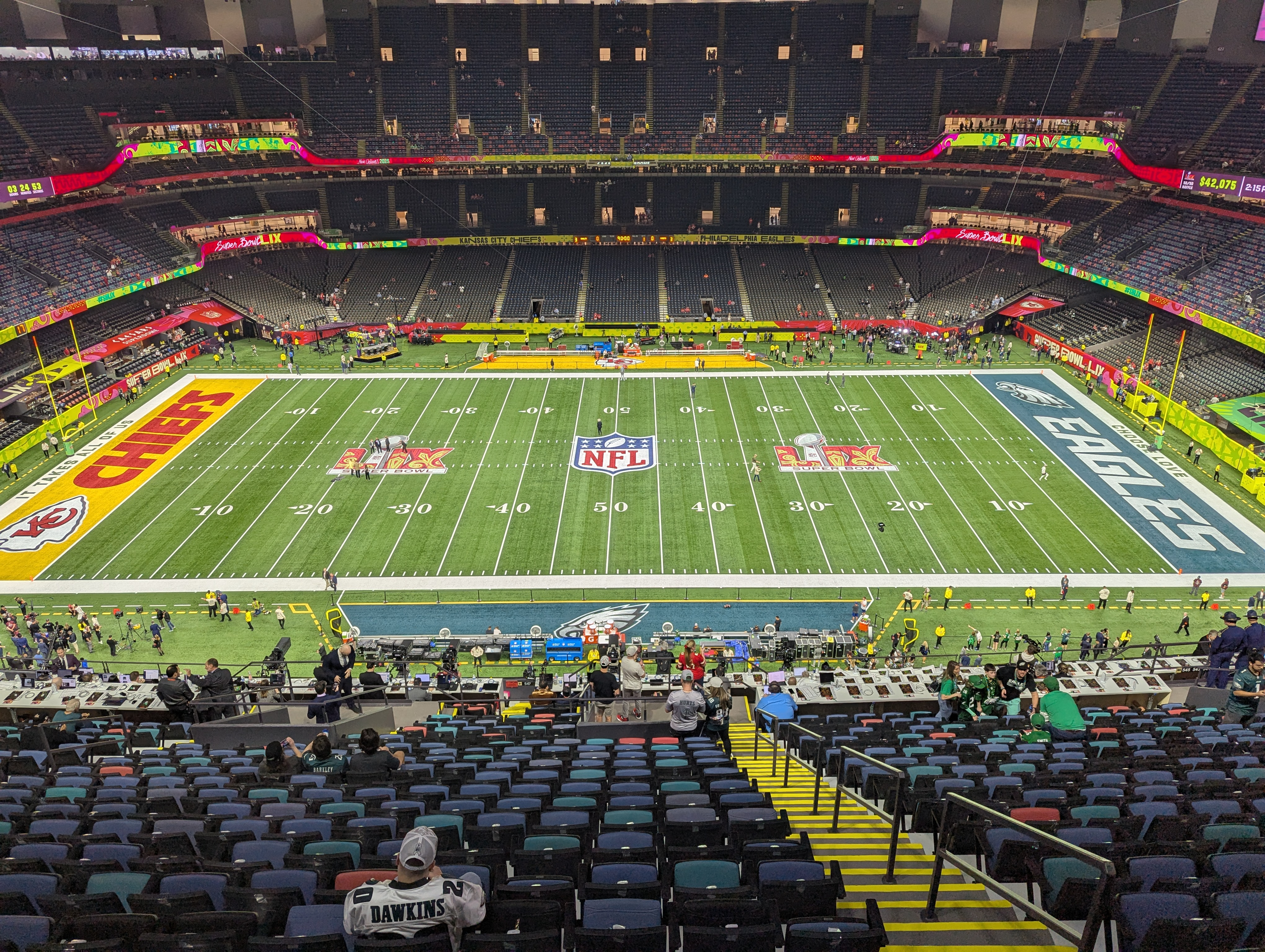
The stadium and field setup for Super Bowl LIX

On February 9, 2025, at the Caesars Superdome in New Orleans, Patrick Mahomes went to his fifth Super Bowl since he became Kansas City's starting quarterback. This made the Chiefs the first team in NFL history to win back-to-back Super Bowls and then appear in the Super Bowl again the following year, and also the first team in NFL history to play in five Super Bowls over a six-year period. The Chiefs played the Philadelphia Eagles in Super Bowl LIX. This was the second time the Chiefs had played a rematch against another team in the Super Bowl. The Eagles successfully avenged their Super Bowl LVII defeat, winning 40–22 after leading 34–0 at the end of the third quarter and preventing the Chiefs from becoming the first team to win three consecutive Super Bowl championships. Jalen Hurts was named Super Bowl LIX MVP.

On February 8, 2026 at Levi's Stadium in Santa Clara, California, the Seattle Seahawks faced the New England Patriots. The game had a slow start, with Seahawks kicker Jason Myers kicking three field goals in the first half and one in the third quarter to give his team a 12–0 lead. The fourth quarter had a bit more action, with a Seattle touchdown and interception. The Seahawks shut out the Patriots for the first three quarters of the Super Bowl LX, leading 12–0 without scoring any touchdowns. The Patriots eventually managed to score 13 points, but could not win. In the end, the Seahawks defeated the Patriots 29–13. This marked the first time in NFL history that a team avenged a prior season's Super Bowl loss against the exact same opponent in back-to-back seasons (the Eagles had lost to the Chiefs in LVII & the Seahawks had lost to the Patriots in XLIX). Seattle running back Kenneth Walker III was named Super Bowl LX MVP.

== Television coverage and ratings ==
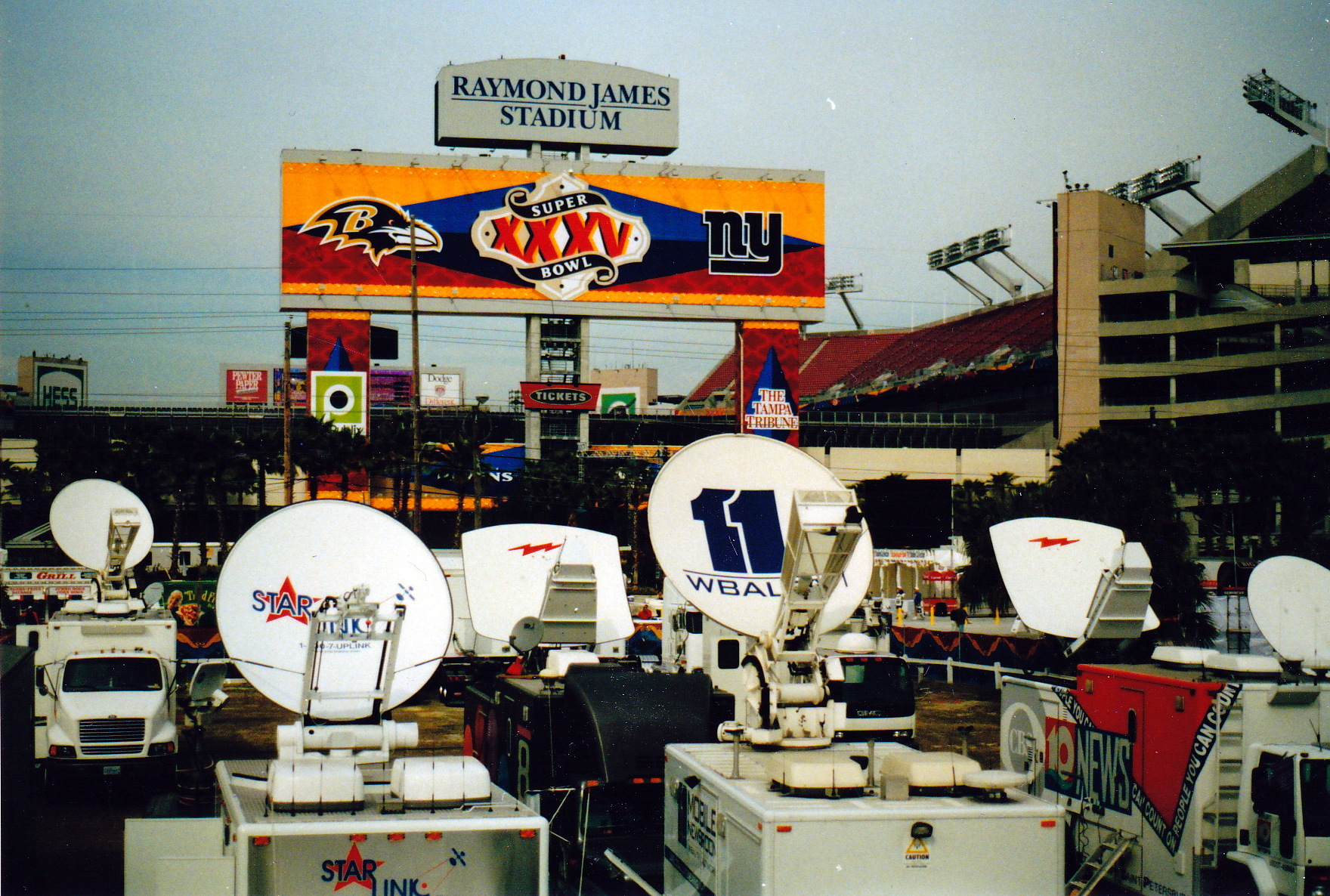
The Super Bowl XXXV broadcasting compound, full of satellite trucks

The Super Bowl is one of the most-watched annual sporting events in the world, with viewership overwhelmingly domestic. The only other annual event that gathers more viewers is the UEFA Champions League final. For many years, the Super Bowl has possessed a large US and global television viewership, and it is often the most-watched United States originating television program of the year. The game tends to have a high Nielsen television rating, which is usually around a 40 rating and 60 shares. This means that, on average, more than 100 million people from the United States alone are tuned into the Super Bowl at any given moment.

In press releases preceding the game, the NFL has claimed that the Super Bowl has a potential worldwide audience of around one billion people in over 200 countries. However, this figure refers to the number of people able to watch the game, not the number of people who will actually be watching. Regardless, the statements have been frequently misinterpreted in the media as referring to the latter figure, leading to a misperception about the game's actual global audience. The New York-based media research firm Initiative measured the global audience for the Super Bowl XXXIX at 93 million people, with 98 percent of that figure being viewers in North America, which meant roughly two million people outside North America watched the Super Bowl that year.

Super Bowl LIX holds the record for average number of US viewers, with an average of 127.7 million viewers in the United States, making the game the most-viewed television broadcast of any kind in American history.

The highest-rated game according to Nielsen was Super Bowl XVI in 1982, which was watched in 49.1% of households (73 shares), or 40,020,000 households at the time. Super Bowl XVI still ranks fourth on Nielsen's list of top-rated programs of all time, with three other Super Bowls (XVII, XX, and XLIX) in the top ten.

Famous Super Bowl commercials include the 1984 introduction of Apple's Macintosh computer, the Budweiser "Bud Bowl" campaign, and the dot-com ads aired during Super Bowl XXXIV. As the television ratings of the Super Bowl have steadily increased over the years, commercial prices have also increased, with advertisers paying as much as $7 million for a thirty-second spot during Super Bowl LVI in 2022. A segment of the audience tunes into the Super Bowl solely to view commercials. In 2010, Nielsen reported that 51 percent of Super Bowl viewers tune in for the commercials.

Since 1991, the Super Bowl has begun between 6:19 and 6:40 PM EST so that most of the game is played during the primetime hours on the East Coast.

=== American television rights ===
Throughout most of its history, the Super Bowl has been rotated annually between the same American television networks that broadcast the NFL's regular season and postseason games.

Super Bowl I, played in 1967, is the only Super Bowl to have been broadcast in the United States by two different broadcasters simultaneously. At the time, NBC held the rights to nationally televise AFL games while CBS had the rights to broadcast NFL games. Both networks were allowed to cover the game, and each network used its own announcers, but NBC was only allowed to use the CBS feed instead of producing its own.

Beginning with Super Bowl II, NBC televised the game in even years and CBS in odd years. This annual rotation between the two networks continued through the 1970 AFL–NFL merger when NBC was given the rights to televise AFC games and CBS winning the rights to broadcast NFC games. Although ABC began broadcasting Monday Night Football in 1970, it was not added to the Super Bowl rotation until Super Bowl XIX, played in 1985. ABC, CBS and NBC then continued to rotate the Super Bowl until 1994, when Fox replaced CBS as the NFC broadcaster. CBS then took NBC's place in the rotation after CBS replaced NBC as the AFC broadcaster in 1998. As a result of new contracts signed in 2006, with NBC taking over Sunday Night Football from ESPN, and Monday Night Football moving from ABC to ESPN, NBC took ABC's place in the Super Bowl rotation. The rotation between CBS, Fox, and NBC will continue until the new contracts that took effect for the first time with Super Bowl LVIII, allowing ABC to return and starting a four-network rotation.

The four-year rotation beginning with Super Bowl LVIII also allows each broadcaster to offer simulcasts or alternative broadcasts on its sister networks and platforms. CBS's sister network Nickelodeon aired an alternate children-oriented telecast of Super Bowl LVIII. And ABC's rights include ESPN simulcasts and alternative broadcasts on other ESPN networks.

The NFL has broken the traditional broadcasting rotation if it can be used to bolster other major sporting events a network airs around the time game is played . For example, CBS was given Super Bowl XXVI (1992) after it won the rights to air the 1992 Winter Olympics, with NBC subsequently airing Super Bowl XXVII (1993) and Super Bowl XXVIII (1994) in consecutive years. Likewise, NBC aired Super Bowl LVI (2022) instead of CBS during the 2022 Winter Olympics, which were also aired by NBC. CBS received Super Bowl LV (2021) in return. Under the four-network rotation that's been in place since 2024, the league awarded NBC the Super Bowl during Winter Olympic years.

The first six Super Bowls were blacked out in the television markets of the host cities, due to league restrictions then in place. Super Bowl VII (1973) was telecast in Los Angeles on an experimental basis after all tickets were sold ten days before the game.

Game analyst John Madden is the only person to broadcast a Super Bowl for each of the four networks that have televised the game (five with CBS, three with Fox, two with ABC, and one with NBC).

Network	Number broadcast	Years broadcast	Future scheduled telecasts
ABC	7 (9)	1985, 1988, 1991, 1995, 2000, 2003, 2006	2027, 2031
Fox	11 (13)	1997, 1999, 2002, 2005, 2008, 2011, 2014, 2017, 2020, 2023, 2025	2029, 2033
NBC	21 (23)	1967, 1969, 1971, 1973, 1975, 1977, 1979, 1981, 1983, 1986, 1989, 1993, 1994, 1996, 1998, 2009, 2012, 2015, 2018, 2022, 2026	2030, 2034
CBS	22 (24)	1967, 1968, 1970, 1972, 1974, 1976, 1978, 1980, 1982, 1984, 1987, 1990, 1992, 2001, 2004, 2007, 2010, 2013, 2016, 2019, 2021, 2024	2028, 2032

Note: Years listed are the year the game was actually played (will be played) rather than what NFL season it is considered to have been.
*: The current TV contract with the networks expires after the 2033 season (or in early 2034). Under the deal, the Super Bowl is currently rotated annually between CBS, Fox, NBC, and ABC in that order. ABC returned to the rotation with that contract that took effect at the start of the 2023 season. The contract does have an opt-out clause after the 2029 season (or in early 2030), with the exception for ABC's contract, whose opt-out clause is after the 2030 season (or in early 2031).
**: The first Super Bowl was simultaneously broadcast by CBS and NBC, with each network using the same video feed from CBS, but providing its own commentary.

=== Lead-out programming ===
The Super Bowl provides lead-in to programming following it on the same channel, the effects of which can last for several hours. For instance, in discussing the ratings of a local TV station, Buffalo television critic Alan Pergament noted that following Super Bowl XLVII, which aired on CBS: "A paid program that ran on CBS 4 (WIVB-TV) at 2:30 in the morning had a 1.3 rating. That's higher than some CW prime time shows get on WNLO-TV, Channel 4's sister station."

Because of this strong coattail effect, the network that airs the Super Bowl typically takes advantage of the large audience to air an episode of a hit series or to premiere the pilot of a promising new one in the lead-out slot, which immediately follows the Super Bowl and post-game coverage.

== Ceremonies and entertainment ==
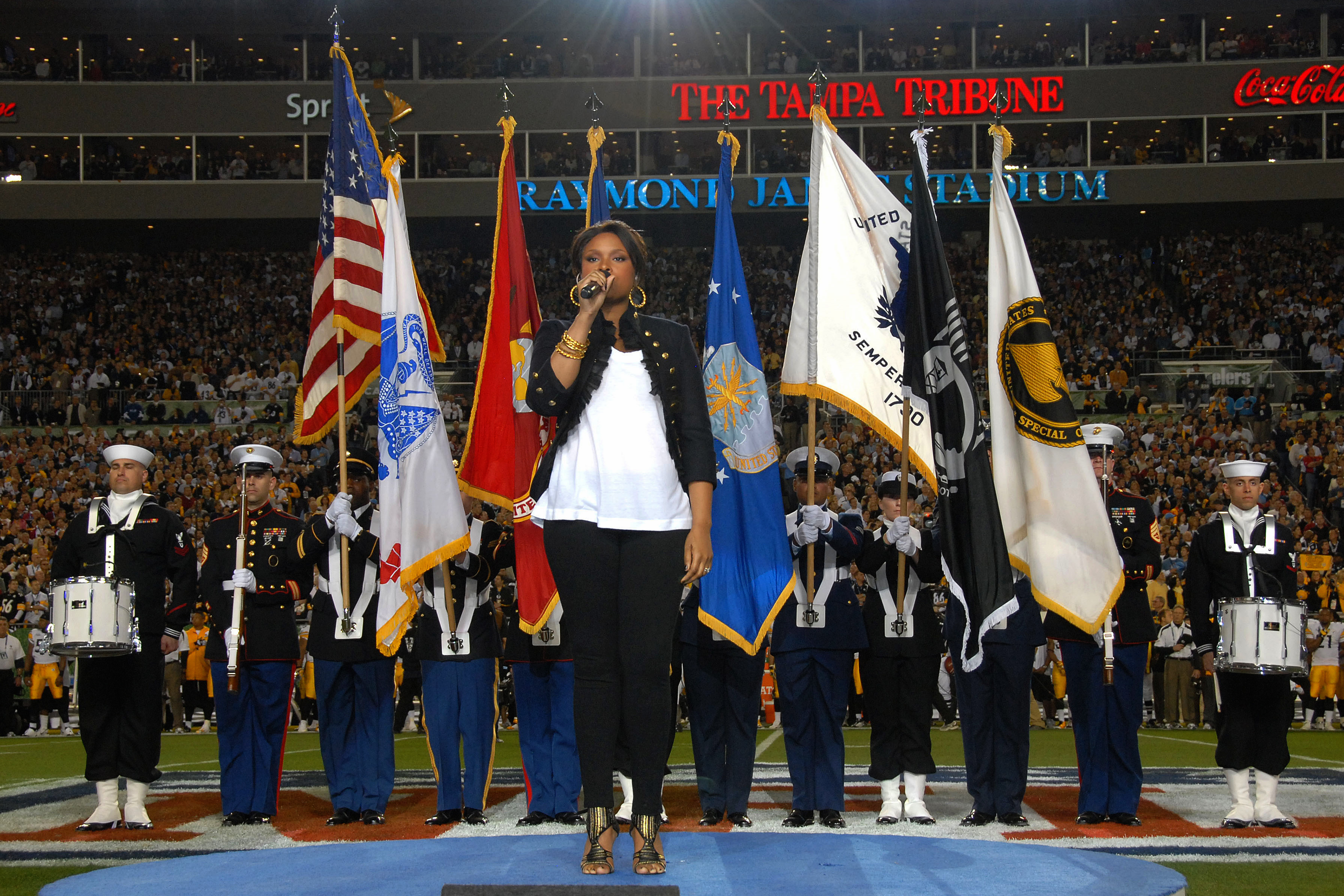
Jennifer Hudson sings the national anthem at Super Bowl XLIII.

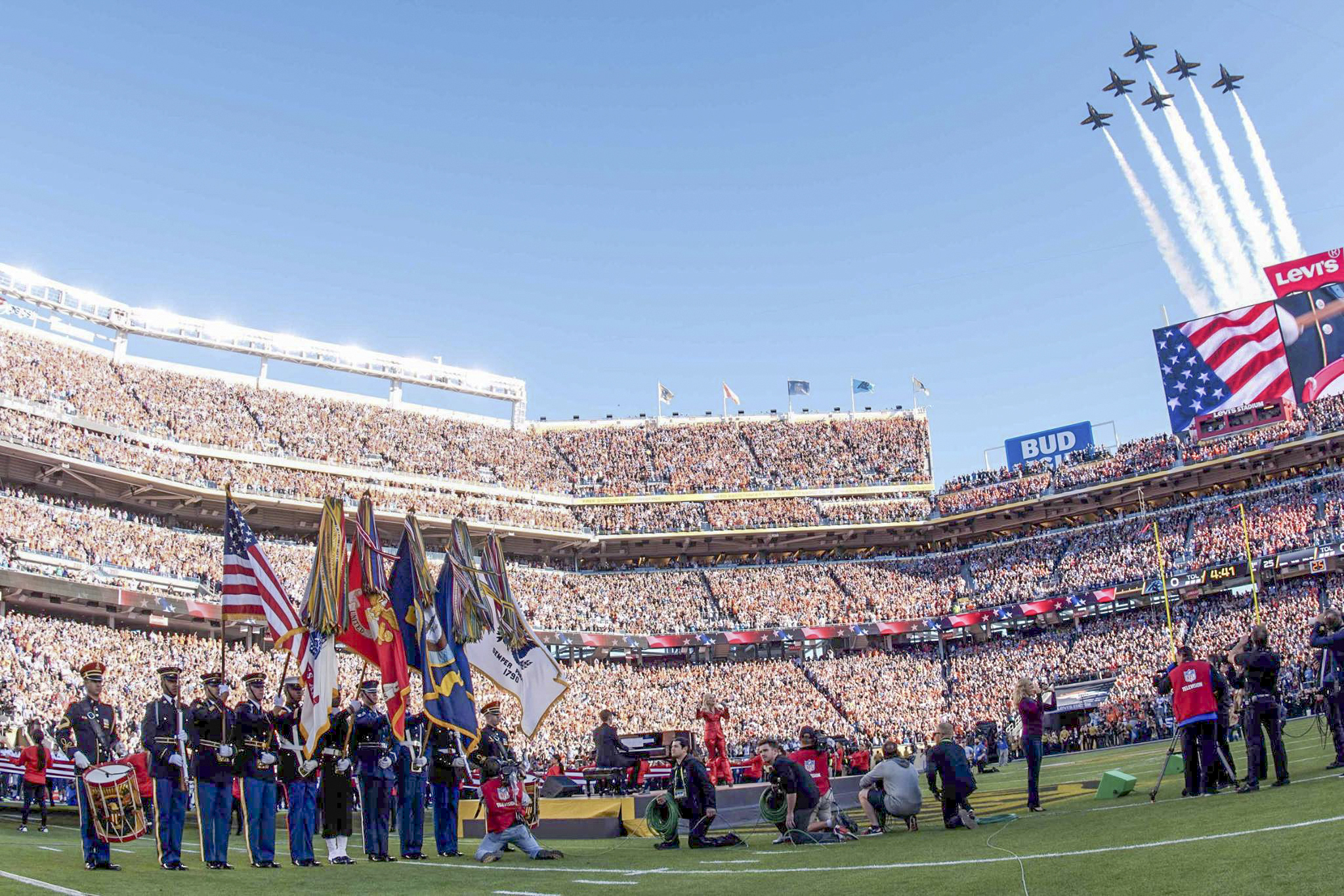
Closing the opening ceremony of Super Bowl 50

Early Super Bowls featured a halftime show consisting of marching bands from local colleges or high schools; but as the popularity of the game increased, a trend emerged where popular singers and musicians performed during its pre-game ceremonies and the halftime show, or simply sang the national anthem of the United States, "America the Beautiful", or "Lift Every Voice and Sing".

The U.S. national anthem has been performed at all but one Super Bowl: Super Bowl XI in 1977 when Vikki Carr sang "America the Beautiful" in place of the anthem. Beginning with Super Bowl XLIII in 2009, "America the Beautiful" is sung before the national anthem every year and is followed by the presentation of the colors and a military flyover preceding the anthem. Beginning with Super Bowl LV in 2021, "Lift Every Voice and Sing" is sung prior to "America the Beautiful" in honor of Black History Month, although initially it was sung in memory of those who died during the Coronavirus pandemic in the United States, during which Super Bowl LV was played.

For many years, Whitney Houston's performance of the national anthem at Super Bowl XXV in 1991, during the Gulf War, had long been regarded as one of the best renditions of the anthem in history. Before Super Bowl XLVIII, soprano Renée Fleming became the first opera singer to perform the anthem.

Recently, the winner of the Walter Payton NFL Man of the Year Award has been acknowledged before "America the Beautiful" and "The Star-Spangled Banner".

Since Super Bowl XII in 1978, a former football player, a celebrity, or another special guest participates in the coin toss ceremony to recognize their community involvement or significance.

The pre-game ceremonies usually go in the following order:

- Presentation of the Most Valuable Players, occurred every ten years since 1986
- "Lift Every Voice and Sing"
- Walter Payton NFL Man of the Year Award presentation
- "America the Beautiful"
- Presentation of the Colors
- "The Star-Spangled Banner" followed by flyover
- Coin toss

Unlike regular season or playoff games, thirty minutes are allocated for the Super Bowl halftime. After a special live episode of the Fox sketch comedy series In Living Color caused a drop in viewership for the Super Bowl XXVI halftime show, the NFL sought to increase the Super Bowl's audience by hiring A-list talent to perform. They approached Michael Jackson, whose performance the following year drew higher figures than the game itself. U2 performed at Super Bowl XXXVI in 2002; during their third song, "Where the Streets Have No Name", the band played under a large projection screen which scrolled through names of the victims of the September 11 attacks.

The halftime show of Super Bowl XXXVIII attracted controversy, following an incident in which Justin Timberlake removed a piece of Janet Jackson's top, briefly exposing one of her breasts before the broadcast quickly cut away from the shot. The incident led to fines being issued by the FCC (and a larger crackdown over "indecent" content broadcast on television), and MTV (then a sister to the game's broadcaster that year, CBS, under Viacom) being banned by the NFL from producing the Super Bowl halftime show in the future. In an effort to prevent a repeat of the incident, the NFL held a moratorium on Super Bowl halftime shows featuring pop performers, and instead invited a single, headlining veteran act, such as Paul McCartney, the Rolling Stones, the Who, Prince, and Bruce Springsteen. This practice ended at Super Bowl XLV, which returned to using current pop acts such as the Black Eyed Peas, Katy Perry, and Lady Gaga.

Minnesota Vikings announcer Alan Roach is the official public address announcer of the Super Bowl since Super Bowl XL in 2006, with the exceptions of Super Bowl XLVIII, XLIX and 50 when the Denver Broncos played in those games. Roach was also Denver's regular P.A. announcer during those years, and thus the league felt it was a potential competitive advantage. In those years, NFL on Westwood One host and NFL Films voice Scott Graham held the duties.

Excluding Super Bowl XXXIX, the "I'm going to Disney World!" advertising campaign took place in every Super Bowl since Super Bowl XXI in 1987, when quarterback Phil Simms from the Giants became the first player to say the tagline.

== Venues ==
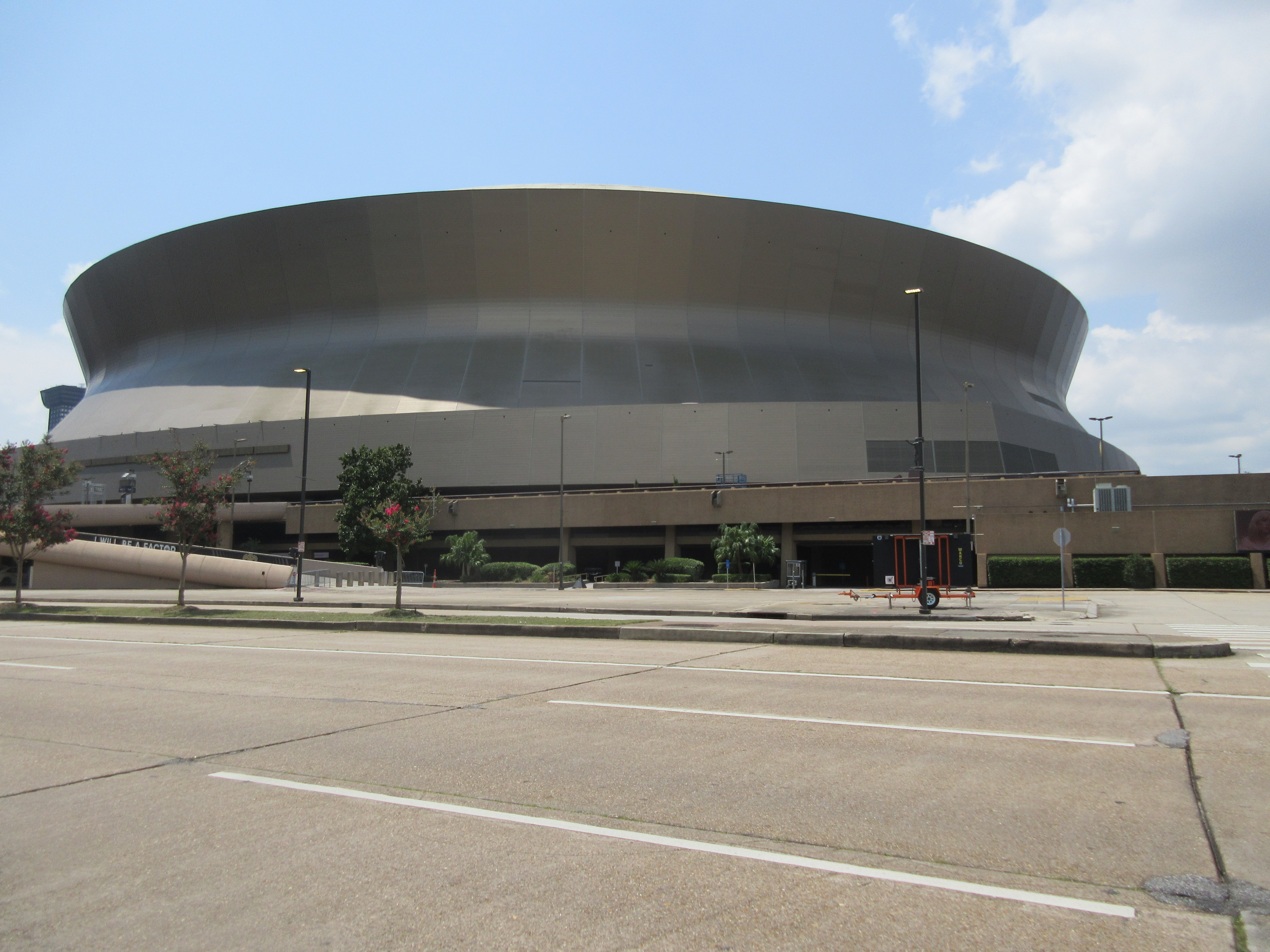
The Caesars Superdome has hosted eight out of the record-tying eleven Super Bowls played in New Orleans.

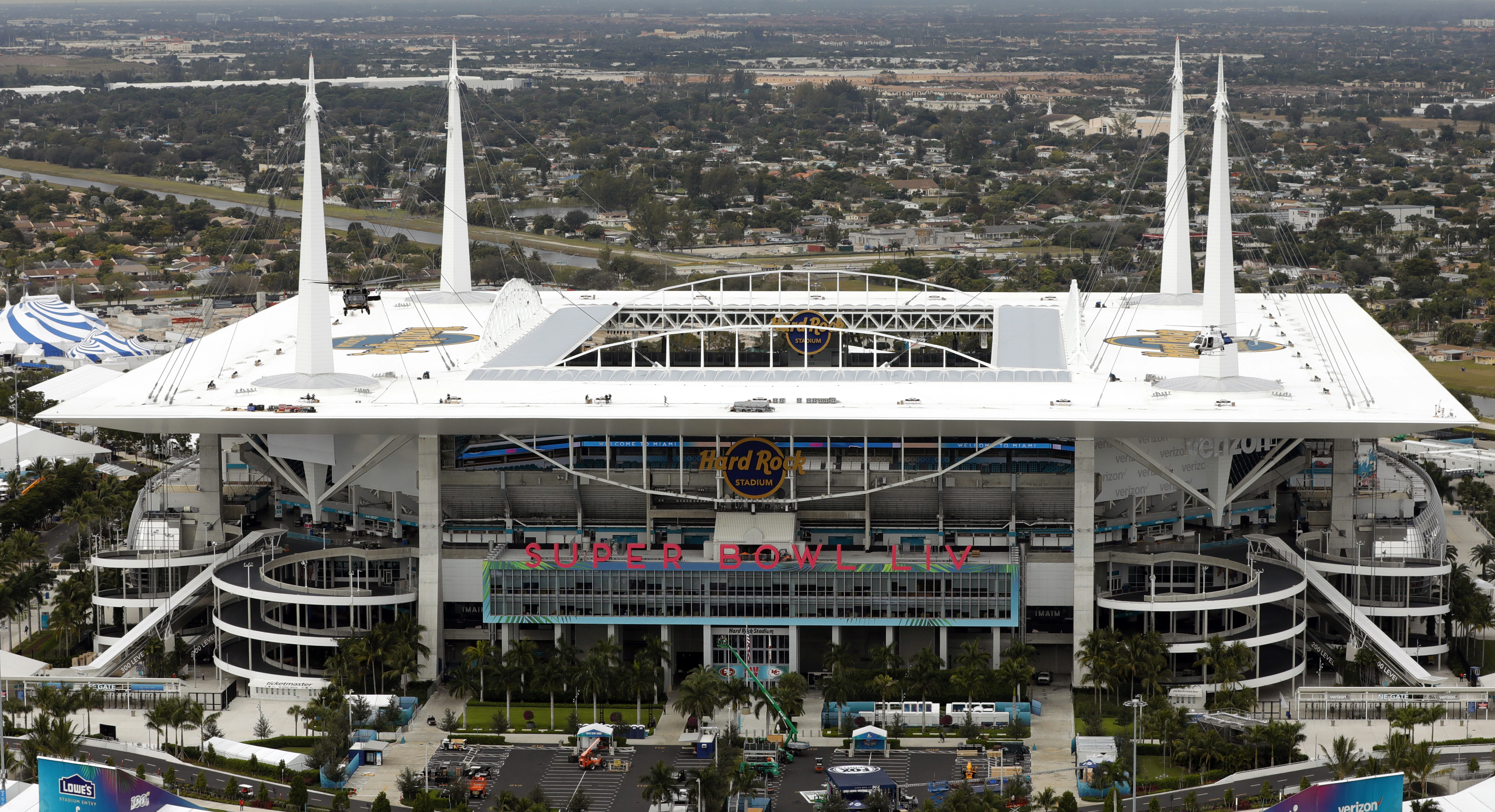
Hard Rock Stadium has hosted six out of the record-tying eleven Super Bowls played in the Miami metropolitan area.

As of Super Bowl LX, 30 of 60 Super Bowls have been played in three metropolitan areas: the Greater Miami area (eleven times), New Orleans (eleven times), and the Greater Los Angeles area (eight times). No market or region without an active NFL franchise has ever hosted a Super Bowl, and the presence of an NFL team in a market or region is now a de jure requirement for bidding on the game. For instance, while Los Angeles has been an eight-time host city, with its most recent being Super Bowl LVI in 2022, it did not host one from the departure of both its NFL teams in 1995 until the Rams and the Chargers subsequently returned to Los Angeles in 2016 and 2017 respectively. The Caesars Superdome in New Orleans has hosted eight Super Bowls, the most of any venue. The Orange Bowl was the only AFL stadium to host a Super Bowl and the only stadium to host consecutive Super Bowls, hosting Super Bowls II and III.

Seven Super Bowls have been held in a stadium other than the one the NFL team in that city was using at the time, a situation that has not arisen after Super Bowl XXVII's host stadium was selected on March 19, 1991. This was as the winning market was previously not required to host the Super Bowl in the same stadium that its NFL team used, if the stadium in which the Super Bowl was held was perceived to be a better stadium for a large high-profile event than the existing NFL home stadium in the same city; for example, five of Los Angeles's Bowls were played at the Rose Bowl, which has never been used by any NFL franchise outside of the Super Bowl. Besides the Rose Bowl, the only other Super Bowl venues that were not the home stadium to NFL teams at the time were Rice Stadium (the Houston Oilers had played in Rice Stadium previously but moved to the Astrodome several years before Super Bowl VIII) and Stanford Stadium. Starting with the selection of the Super Bowl XXVIII venue on May 23, 1990, the league has given preference in awarding the Super Bowl to brand new or recently renovated NFL stadiums, alongside a trend of teams demanding public money or relocating to play in new stadiums.

To date only two teams have qualified for a Super Bowl at their home stadiums: the 2020 Tampa Bay Buccaneers, who won Super Bowl LV hosted at Raymond James Stadium (selected on May 23, 2017), and the 2021 Los Angeles Rams the following season, who won Super Bowl LVI at SoFi Stadium. Before that, the closest any team had come to accomplishing this feat were the 2017 Minnesota Vikings, who reached the NFC Championship Game but lost to the Eagles. In that instance, U.S. Bank Stadium became the first Super Bowl host stadium (selected on May 20, 2014) to also host a Divisional Playoff Game in the same season (which the Vikings won); all previous times that the Super Bowl host stadium hosted another playoff game in the same postseason were all Wild Card games. Two teams have played the Super Bowl in their home market but at a different venue than their home stadium: the 1979 Los Angeles Rams, who lost Super Bowl XIV in the Rose Bowl instead of Los Angeles Memorial Coliseum; and the 1984 San Francisco 49ers, who won Super Bowl XIX in Stanford Stadium instead of Candlestick Park, during a time when the league often picked a stadium that was not home to an NFL team to host the Super Bowl (see above).

Traditionally, the NFL does not award Super Bowls to stadiums that are located in climates with an expected average daily temperature less than 50 °F (10 °C) on game day unless the field can be completely covered by a fixed or retractable roof. Six Super Bowls have been played in northern cities: two in the Detroit area—Super Bowl XVI at Pontiac Silverdome in Pontiac, Michigan, and Super Bowl XL at Ford Field in Detroit; two in Minneapolis—Super Bowl XXVI at the Hubert H. Humphrey Metrodome and Super Bowl LII at the U.S. Bank Stadium; one in Indianapolis at Lucas Oil Stadium for Super Bowl XLVI; and one in New Jersey—Super Bowl XLVIII at MetLife Stadium. Only MetLife Stadium did not have a roof (be it fixed or retractable) but it was still picked as the host stadium for Super Bowl XLVIII in an apparent waiver of the warm-climate rule, with a contingency plan to reschedule the game in the event of heavy snowfall. MetLife Stadium's selection over Sun Life Stadium generated controversy as the league requested a roof to be added to Sun Life Stadium (a venue afflicted with a heavy rainstorm during Super Bowl XLI) in order to be considered for future Super Bowls, which was done during a remodeling from 2015 into 2016. It then hosted Super Bowl LIV.

There have been a few instances where the league has rescinded the Super Bowl from cities. Super Bowl XXVII in 1993 was originally awarded to Sun Devil Stadium in Tempe, Arizona, but after Arizona voters elected not to recognize Martin Luther King, Jr. Day as a paid state employees' holiday in 1990, the NFL moved the game to the Rose Bowl in Pasadena, California. When voters in Arizona opted to create such a legal holiday in 1992, Super Bowl XXX in 1996 was awarded to Tempe. Super Bowl XXXIII in 1999 was awarded first to Candlestick Park in San Francisco, but when plans to renovate the stadium fell through, the game was moved to Pro Player Stadium in greater Miami. Super Bowl XXXVII in 2003 was awarded to a new stadium not yet built in San Francisco, but when that stadium failed to be built, the game was moved to Qualcomm Stadium in San Diego. Super Bowl XLIV, slated for February 2010, was withdrawn from New York City's proposed West Side Stadium, because the city, state, and proposed tenants (New York Jets) could not agree on funding. Super Bowl XLIV was then eventually awarded to Sun Life Stadium in Miami Gardens, Florida. Super Bowl XLIX in 2015 was originally given to Arrowhead Stadium in Kansas City, Missouri, but after two sales taxes failed to pass at the ballot box (a renovation proposal had passed successfully, but a second ballot question to add a rolling roof structure to be shared with Kaufmann Stadium critical for the game to be hosted was rejected), and opposition by local business leaders and politicians increased, Kansas City eventually withdrew its request to host the game. Super Bowl XLIX was then eventually awarded to University of Phoenix Stadium in Glendale, Arizona. Super Bowl LV in 2021 was first awarded to the yet-to-be completed SoFi Stadium, but construction delays forced the game to be moved to Raymond James Stadium and SoFi Stadium was then given Super Bowl LVI in 2022. Super Bowl LVIII in 2024 was first given to the Superdome, but the NFL's 2021 regular season expansion pushed the game from February 4 to February 11 in a direct conflict with New Orleans' Mardi Gras celebrations; Super Bowl LVIII was then moved to Allegiant Stadium in Nevada and New Orleans was given Super Bowl LIX in 2025.

=== Selection process ===
The location of the Super Bowl is chosen at a meeting of all NFL team owners, usually three to five years before the event. The game has never been played in a metropolitan area that lacked an NFL franchise at the time the game was played, although in 2007 NFL commissioner Roger Goodell suggested that a Super Bowl might be played in London, perhaps at Wembley Stadium.

Through Super Bowl LVI, teams were allowed to bid for the rights to host Super Bowls, where cities submitted proposals to host a Super Bowl and were evaluated in terms of stadium renovation and their ability to host, but this competition was rescinded in 2018. The league has made all decisions regarding hosting sites from Super Bowl LVII onward; the league chose a potential venue unilaterally, the chosen team put together a hosting proposal, and the league voted upon it to determine if it is acceptable.

In 2014, a document listing the specific requirements of Super Bowl hosts was leaked, giving a clear list of what was required for a Super Bowl host. Some of the host requirements include:

- The host stadium must be in a market that hosts an NFL team and must have a minimum of 70,000 seats, with the media and electrical amenities necessary to produce the Super Bowl. Stadiums may include temporary seating for Super Bowls, but seating must be approved by the league. Stadiums where the average game day temperature is below 50 °F (10 °C) must either have a roof or a waiver given by the league. There must be a minimum of 35,000 parking spaces within one mile (1.6 km) of the stadium.
- The host stadium must have space for the Gameday Experience, a large pregame entertainment area, within walking distance of the stadium.
- The host city must have space for the NFL Experience, the interactive football theme park which is operated the week before the Super Bowl. An indoor venue for the event must have a minimum of 850,000 square feet (79,000 m^{2}), and an outdoor venue must have a minimum of 1,000,000 square feet (93,000 m^{2}). Additionally, there must be space nearby for the Media Center, and space for all other events involved in the Super Bowl week, including golf courses and bowling alleys.
- The necessary infrastructure must be in place around the stadium and other Super Bowl facilities, including parking, security, electrical needs, media needs, communication needs, and transportation needs.
- There must be a minimum number of hotel spaces within one hour's drive of the stadium equaling 35% of the stadium's capacity, along with hotels for the teams, officials, media, and other dignitaries. (For Super Bowl XXXIX, the city of Jacksonville docked several luxury cruise liners at its port to act as temporary hotel space.)
- There must be practice space of equal and comparable quality for both teams within a twenty-minute drive of the team hotels, and rehearsal space for all events within a reasonable distance to the stadium. The practice facilities must have one grass field and at least one field of the same surface as the host stadium.

Much of the cost of a Super Bowl is to be assumed by the host community, although some costs are enumerated within the requirements to be assumed by the NFL. New Orleans, the site of Super Bowl XLVII in 2013, invested more than $1 billion in infrastructure improvements in the years leading up to the game.

The NFL allocates backup stadiums for the Super Bowl every year, in the event of a last-minute relocation of the game.

=== Home team designation ===
The designated "home team" alternates between the NFC team in odd-numbered games and the AFC team in even-numbered games. This alternation was initiated with the first Super Bowl, when the Packers were the designated home team. Regardless of being the home or away team of record, each team has its team logo and wordmark painted in one of the end zones. Designated away teams have won 33 of 60 Super Bowls to date (approximately 55%).

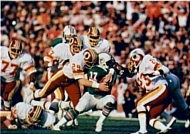
Washington is one of six designated home teams that chose to wear the white jersey, shown here in Super Bowl XVII.

Since Super Bowl XIII in 1979, the home team is given the choice of wearing its colored or white jerseys. Originally, the designated home team had to wear its colored jerseys, which resulted in the Cowboys donning their less exposed dark blue jerseys for Super Bowl V. While most of the home teams in the Super Bowl have chosen to wear their colored jerseys, there have been eight exceptions: the Cowboys in Super Bowls XIII and XXVII, the Washington Redskins in Super Bowl XVII, the Steelers in Super Bowl XL, the Broncos in Super Bowl 50, the Patriots in Super Bowls LII and LX, and the Buccaneers in Super Bowl LV. The Cowboys have primarily worn white jerseys at home since 1964. Washington also primarily wore white at home during that period between 1981 and 2000. Although the Steelers always worn their black jerseys at home since the AFL–NFL merger in 1970, they opted for the white jerseys in Super Bowl XL after winning three consecutive playoff games on the road. For the Broncos in Super Bowl 50, Denver general manager John Elway simply stated, "We've had Super Bowl success in our white uniforms"; they previously had been 0–4 in Super Bowls when wearing their orange jerseys, losing those games in terrible fashion. It was unclear why the Patriots chose to wear their white jerseys in Super Bowl LII, since New England mostly worn their blue jerseys for home games during the pairing of Bill Belichick and Tom Brady. The Patriots were 3–0 in their white uniforms in Super Bowls before Super Bowl LII with Belichick and Brady, and they may have been going on recent trends of teams who wear white for the Super Bowl game. New England later adopted a "road warrior" mentality under coach Mike Vrabel, going 9–0 (including postseason) on the road to advance to Super Bowl LX. For Super Bowl LV, when the Buccaneers became the first team to reach the Super Bowl that their own stadium hosted, the Buccaneers were designated the home team as per AFC-NFC rotation and elected to wear their white jerseys; the team often wears white at home during the first half of the regular season, and they had won both their divisional and championship post-season games on the road in white jerseys. White-shirted teams have won 37 of 60 Super Bowls overall, and won 15 of the last 21 Super Bowls since Super Bowl XXXIX (the only teams to win in their colored jerseys during these recent games are the Packers against the Steelers in Super Bowl XLV, the Eagles against the Patriots in Super Bowl LII, the Chiefs against the 49ers in Super Bowls LIV and LVIII, the Eagles against the Chiefs in LIX, and the Seattle Seahawks against the Patriots in Super Bowl LX).

The 49ers, as part of the league's 75th Anniversary celebration, used their 1955 throwback uniform in Super Bowl XXIX, which for that year was their regular home jersey. The Los Angeles Rams in Super Bowl LIII wore their royal blue and yellow uniforms, which was a throwback uniform but then turned into their primary colors over the navy blue and metallic gold uniform, which they have previously worn for six home games including a home playoff game. No team has yet worn a third jersey or Color Rush uniform for the Super Bowl. The 49ers reportedly requested to wear an all-white third jersey ensemble for Super Bowl LIV, which the San Francisco Chronicle noted they could do with special permission from the league; the league never granted such permission, and the 49ers instead opted for their standard uniform of white jerseys with gold pants.

=== Host cities/regions ===
Super Bowl host cities/regions

Sixteen different regions have hosted Super Bowls.

City/Region	No. hosted	Years hosted
Miami metropolitan area	11	1968, 1969, 1971, 1976, 1979, 1989, 1995, 1999, 2007, 2010, 2020
New Orleans	11	1970, 1972, 1975, 1978, 1981, 1986, 1990, 1997, 2002, 2013, 2025
Greater Los Angeles	8 (9)	1967, 1973, 1977, 1980, 1983, 1987, 1993, 2022, 2027
Tampa	5	1984, 1991, 2001, 2009, 2021
Phoenix metropolitan area	4	1996, 2008, 2015, 2023
San Diego	3	1988, 1998, 2003
Houston	3	1974, 2004, 2017
Atlanta	3 (4)	1994, 2000, 2019, 2028
San Francisco Bay Area	3	1985, 2016, 2026
Metro Detroit	2	1982, 2006
Minneapolis	2	1992, 2018
Jacksonville	1	2005
Dallas–Fort Worth Metroplex	1	2011
Indianapolis	1	2012
East Rutherford (New York City)	1	2014
Las Vegas Valley	1 (2)	2024, 2029
Nashville	(1)	2030

Note: Years listed are the year the game was actually played (or will be played; future games are denoted through italics) rather than what NFL season it is considered to have been.

=== Host stadiums ===
A total of 29 different stadiums have either hosted, or are scheduled to host, a Super Bowl, with 14 of the stadiums having hosted, or are scheduled to host, more than one Super Bowl. Eight of the Super Bowl hosting stadiums have been demolished.

The years listed in the table below are the years the game was actually played (will be played) rather than the NFL season it concluded.

Stadium	Location	No. hosted	Years hosted
Caesars Superdome	New Orleans, Louisiana	8	1978, 1981, 1986, 1990, 1997, 2002, 2013, 2025
Hard Rock Stadium	Miami Gardens, Florida	6	1989, 1995, 1999, 2007, 2010, 2020
Orange Bowl	Miami, Florida	5	1968, 1969, 1971, 1976, 1979
Rose Bowl	Pasadena, California	5	1977, 1980, 1983, 1987, 1993
Tulane Stadium	New Orleans, Louisiana	3	1970, 1972, 1975
San Diego Stadium	San Diego, California	3	1988, 1998, 2003
Raymond James Stadium	Tampa, Florida	3	2001, 2009, 2021
State Farm Stadium	Glendale, Arizona	3	2008, 2015, 2023
Los Angeles Memorial Coliseum	Los Angeles, California	2	1967, 1973
Tampa Stadium	Tampa, Florida	2	1984, 1991
Georgia Dome	Atlanta, Georgia	2	1994, 2000
NRG Stadium	Houston, Texas	2	2004, 2017
Levi's Stadium	Santa Clara, California	2	2016, 2026
Rice Stadium	Houston, Texas	1	1974
Pontiac Silverdome	Pontiac, Michigan	1	1982
Stanford Stadium	Stanford, California	1	1985
Hubert H. Humphrey Metrodome	Minneapolis, Minnesota	1	1992
Sun Devil Stadium	Tempe, Arizona	1	1996
Everbank Stadium	Jacksonville, Florida	1	2005
Ford Field	Detroit, Michigan	1	2006
AT&T Stadium	Arlington, Texas	1	2011
Lucas Oil Stadium	Indianapolis, Indiana	1	2012
MetLife Stadium	East Rutherford, New Jersey	1	2014
U.S. Bank Stadium	Minneapolis, Minnesota	1	2018
Mercedes-Benz Stadium	Atlanta, Georgia	1 (2)	2019, 2028
SoFi Stadium	Inglewood, California	1 (2)	2022, 2027
Allegiant Stadium	Paradise, Nevada	1 (2)	2024, 2029
New Nissan Stadium	Nashville, Tennessee	(1)	2030

^: Stadium has since been demolished.
‡: Prior to the incorporation of Miami Gardens in 2003, the stadium was in unincorporated Miami-Dade County.
††: The original Stanford Stadium, which hosted Super Bowl XIX, was demolished and a new stadium constructed on the site in 2006.
ˇ: Future Super Bowls, also denoted by italics.

==== Future venues ====
Year	Venue	Location
2027	SoFi Stadium	Inglewood, California
2028	Mercedes-Benz Stadium	Atlanta, Georgia
2029	Allegiant Stadium	Paradise, Nevada
2030	New Nissan Stadium	Nashville, Tennessee

The Super Bowl has not yet been played in any region that lacked an NFL or AFL franchise at the time the game was played.

San Diego is the only metropolitan area as of 2021 that has hosted past Super Bowls, but does not currently have an NFL franchise: San Diego Stadium hosted three Super Bowls before the city's NFL franchise relocated to Los Angeles. Also, London, England, has occasionally been mentioned as a host city for a Super Bowl in the future. Wembley Stadium has hosted several NFL games as part of the NFL International Series and is specifically designed for large, individual events, and NFL Commissioner Roger Goodell has openly discussed the possibility on different occasions.

Time zone complications are a significant obstacle to a Super Bowl in London; a typical 6:30 p.m. EST start would result in the game beginning at 11:30 p.m. local time in London: this is an unusually late hour to be holding spectator sports, while the NFL has never in its history started a game later than 9:15 p.m. local time.

Eight stadiums that hosted at least one Super Bowl no longer exist:

- Tulane Stadium, on the Tulane University campus, which hosted three Super Bowls, was demolished in November 1979.
- Tampa Stadium, which hosted two Super Bowls, was demolished in April 1999.
- Stanford Stadium, which hosted one Super Bowl, was demolished and redeveloped in 2005–06.
- The Orange Bowl, which hosted five Super Bowls, was demolished in May 2008. LoanDepot Park now sits on the former site of the Orange Bowl.
- The Hubert H. Humphrey Metrodome in Minneapolis, which hosted one Super Bowl, was demolished in March 2014. U.S. Bank Stadium now sits on the former site of the Metrodome.
- The Georgia Dome in Atlanta, which hosted two Super Bowls, was demolished in November 2017.
- The Pontiac Silverdome in suburban Detroit, which hosted one Super Bowl, was demolished in March 2018.
- San Diego Stadium, which hosted three Super Bowls, was demolished in early 2021.

== Super Bowl trademark ==
The NFL very actively seeks to prevent what it calls unauthorized commercial use of its trademarked terms "NFL", "Super Bowl", and "Super Bowl Sunday". As a result, many events and promotions tied to the game, but not sanctioned by the NFL, are asked to refer to it as "The Big Game", or other generic descriptions. A radio spot for Planters nuts parodied this, by saying "it would be super ... to have a bowl ... of Planters nuts while watching the big game!" and comedian Stephen Colbert began referring to the game in 2014 as the "Superb Owl". In 2015, the NFL filed opposition with the USPTO Trademark Trial and Appeal Board to a trademark application submitted by an Arizona-based nonprofit for "Superb Owl". Another entity has a service mark for "Superb Owl".

The NFL claims that the use of the phrase "Super Bowl" implies an NFL affiliation, and on this basis the league asserts broad rights to restrict how the game may be shown publicly; for example, the league says Super Bowl showings are prohibited in churches or at other events that "promote a message", while non-sporting event venues are also prohibited to show the Super Bowl on any television screen larger than 55 inches. Some critics say the NFL is exaggerating its ownership rights by stating that "any use is prohibited", as this contradicts the broad doctrine of fair use in the United States. Legislation was proposed by Utah Senator Orrin Hatch in 2008 "to provide an exemption from exclusive rights in copyright for certain nonprofit organizations to display live football games", and "for other purposes".

In 2004, the NFL started issuing cease-and-desist letters to casinos in Las Vegas that were hosting Super Bowl parties. "Super Bowl" is a registered trademark, owned by the NFL, and any other business using that name for profit-making ventures is in violation of federal law, according to the letters. In reaction to the letters, many Las Vegas resorts, rather than discontinue the popular and lucrative parties, started referring to them as "Big Game Parties".

In 2006, the NFL made an attempt to trademark "The Big Game" as well; however, it withdrew the application in 2007 due to growing commercial and public relations opposition to the move, mostly from Stanford University and the University of California, Berkeley and their fans, as the Stanford Cardinal football and California Golden Bears football teams compete in the Big Game, which has been played since 1892 (28 years before the formation of the NFL and 75 years before Super Bowl I). Additionally, the Mega Millions lottery game was known as The Big Game (then The Big Game Mega Millions) from 1996 to 2002.

== Traditions ==
Over the years, the Super Bowl has developed a number of traditions and mainstays. Some date back to the earliest Super Bowls, while others are more recent inventions.

=== Roman numerals ===
Unique among the major North American professional sports leagues, the NFL uses Roman numerals to designate its championship Super Bowl game. It was first used for Super Bowl V and applied retroactively to the preceding four editions. An exception to this rule occurred in Super Bowl 50 for marketing purposes.

=== Commercials ===
The Super Bowl is one of the few events in which more than 100 million people view the same content simultaneously, and has been called "one of the last remaining monocultural events in human history" and "the last bastion of true human-to-human connection". Super Bowl ads themselves have become a spectacle, a barometer of cultural relevance, "expos[ing] a deeper truth about contemporary capitalism". The cost of a 30-second ad grew from $37,500 ($362,088 in 2025) in 1967 to $8,000,000 in 2026 (over $266,000 per second), thus exemplifying the attention economy.

=== Presidential interview ===
Since George W. Bush, every President of the United States has sat for at least one pre-game Super Bowl interview. President Bush was interviewed before the game in 2004, but it did not become a regular tradition until the Presidency of Barack Obama, who was interviewed each year of his presidency. Donald Trump was interviewed in 2017, 2019, and 2020 and Joe Biden was interviewed in 2021 and 2022. In 2025, Trump was again interviewed during the first year of his second term. Interview topics were mostly apolitical and focused on football before 2014, but this changed when Bill O'Reilly conducted a more confrontational interview with President Obama before Super Bowl XLVIII. Since then, interviews have been more focused on politics and public policy.

== See also ==
- Grey Cup, the Canadian Football League (CFL) championship game
- History of National Football League championship
- List of NFL champions (1920–1969)
- List of NFL franchise post-season droughts
- List of NFL franchise post-season streaks
- List of players with most Super Bowl championships
- List of quarterbacks with multiple Super Bowl starts
- List of Super Bowl broadcasters
- List of Super Bowl champions
- List of Super Bowl head coaches
- List of Super Bowl officials
- List of Super Bowl records
- List of Super Bowl starting quarterbacks
- NFL Honors
- Super Bowl advertising
- Super Bowl counterprogramming
- Super Bowl curse
- Super Bowl indicator
