= Missy Gregg =

Retired American soccer player

Personal information
- Date of birth: c. 1981 (age 44–45)
- Place of birth: Centerville, Ohio
- Position: Forward

College career
Years	Team	Apps	(Gls)
1999–2000	Dayton Flyers	43	(45)
2001–2002	Christian Brothers Lady Buccaneers	47	(135)

Missy Gregg is a retired American soccer player who played in the Women's United Soccer Association (WUSA).

== Early life and education ==
Gregg was raised in Centerville, Ohio. Though she initially attended the University of Dayton, she graduated from Christian Brothers University in 2003.

== Career ==
While studying at Christian Brothers University, Gregg played for the school's soccer team. During her tenure, the team earned a Division II National Championship title. Although she only played in 47 games, she holds, as of 2022, she holds seven National Collegiate Athletic Association (NCAA) records, including total number of goals scored in a single season (73), points in a single season (156), career points (287), and career goals (180), as well as average points per game (7.09) and goals per game in a season (3.32), and goals per game for career (2.81). She was also named the NSCAA/Adidas national Player of the Year in 2001 and 2002, becoming the first player, regardless of gender, two receive the award more than once, and was named the Gulf South Conference Player of the Year in 2001 and 2002. For the 2002–2003 school year, she won the Honda Sports Award.

In 2003, Gregg stated she intended to remove herself from the WUSA draft to focus on healing a torn knee ligament. However, she was selected in the third round to play for the Washington Freedom, where she would be on loan for a minor league team or remained unsigned for the following season. WUSA folded at the end of the season.

== Hall of Fame ==
Gregg has been inducted into the Tennessee Sports Hall of Fame (2003), Christian Brothers University Athletics Hall of Fame (2014), and Gulf South Conference Hall of Fame (2022).
