= Nissan Stadium =

Nissan Stadium may refer to:

- Nissan Stadium (Nashville), an outdoor American football stadium in Nashville, Tennessee, U.S.
  - Nissan Stadium (2027), an indoor stadium currently under construction, set to replace the existing stadium in 2027
- Nissan Stadium (Yokohama)
