= Tennessee Sports Hall of Fame =

- Established: February 24, 1966
- Location: 501 Broadway; Nashville, Tennessee; United States
- Coordinates: 36°9′33″N 86°46′43″W
- Type: Sports hall of fame
- Chairperson: Harold Graeter
- Website: tshf.net

The Tennessee Sports Hall of Fame is an American hall of fame which honors athletes, teams, coaches, sports writers, and sports executives for their contributions to sports in the state of Tennessee. The Hall of Fame inducted its first class in 1966 and has since grown to include over 500 honorees and inductees. The museum, previously located at Bridgestone Arena in Nashville, is closed to the public as a new location is built at the new Nissan Stadium, which is expected to open in 2027.

== History ==
The Tennessee Sports Hall of Fame was founded in 1966 by the Middle Tennessee Sportswriters and Broadcasters Association, although it is now managed by the State of Tennessee. It was originally located in Knoxville on the campus of the University of Tennessee but later moved to Bridgestone Arena in Nashville. The hall closed to visitors in May 2024 ahead of its relocation to the new Nissan Stadium when the facility opens in 2027.
