= Super Bowl LXII =

2028 National Football League championship game

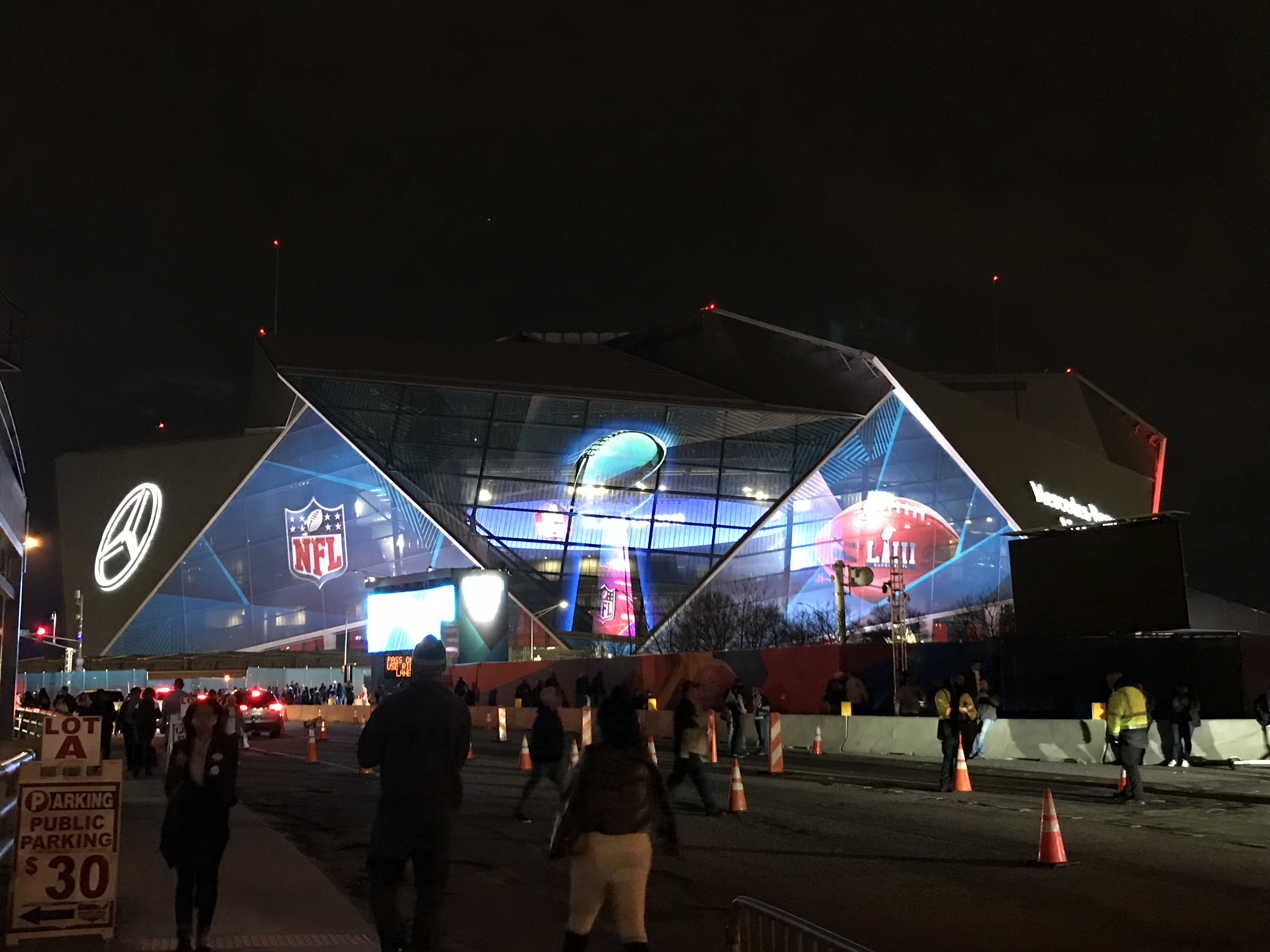
- Mercedes-Benz Stadium decorated for Super Bowl LIII in 2019
- Date: February 13, 2028
- Stadium: Mercedes-Benz Stadium; Atlanta, Georgia

TV in the United States
- Network: Broadcast: CBS (English and SAP); Streaming: Paramount+ NFL+

Radio in the United States
- Network: Westwood One

Super Bowl LXII is the planned American football championship game of the National Football League (NFL) for the 2027 season. The game is scheduled to be played on February 13, 2028, at Mercedes-Benz Stadium in Atlanta, Georgia.

This game will be the fourth Super Bowl hosted by the city of Atlanta. It will also be the second at this venue, the first being Super Bowl LIII in 2019. The game is planned to be televised nationally by CBS.

== Background ==
=== Host selection ===
The league has made all decisions regarding hosting sites from Super Bowl LVII onward. There is no bidding process per site. The league selects a potential venue unilaterally, the chosen team puts together a hosting proposal, and then the league votes to determine whether it is acceptable.

On October 15, 2024, the NFL announced that Mercedes-Benz Stadium, home of the Atlanta Falcons, was selected as the Super Bowl site.

== Broadcasting ==
=== United States ===
==== Television ====
Super Bowl LXII is scheduled to be televised by CBS. It will be the fifth Super Bowl to be broadcast as part of the 11-year NFL television contract, which allows a four-year rotation between CBS, Fox, NBC, and ABC/ESPN.

==== Streaming ====
The game is planned to be streamed live on Paramount+, as well as NFL+ via mobile devices.

==== Radio ====
Westwood One holds the national radio rights to the game.

=== International ===
- In the United Kingdom and Ireland, the game will be televised on the free-to-air Channel 5, which is partially league-owned and part of the CBS Sports family, as well as Sky Sports.
- In Latin America, the game will be televised by ESPN and its streaming and on-demand platform Disney+.
- In Germany and Austria, the game will be televised by TBC.
