= Super Bowl LXIV =

NFL Championship game for the 2029 season

- Date: February 10, 2030
- Stadium: Nissan Stadium; Nashville, Tennessee

TV in the United States
- Network: TV; NBC; Telemundo (Spanish); Universo (Spanish); Streaming; Peacock; NFL+

Radio in the United States
- Network: Westwood One

Super Bowl LXIV is the upcoming American football championship game of the National Football League (NFL) for the 2029 season. The game is scheduled to be played on Sunday, February 10, 2030, at Nissan Stadium in Nashville, Tennessee.

This will be the first Super Bowl to be held in the state of Tennessee and the Nashville metropolitan area. The game will be televised nationally by NBC.

== Host selection ==
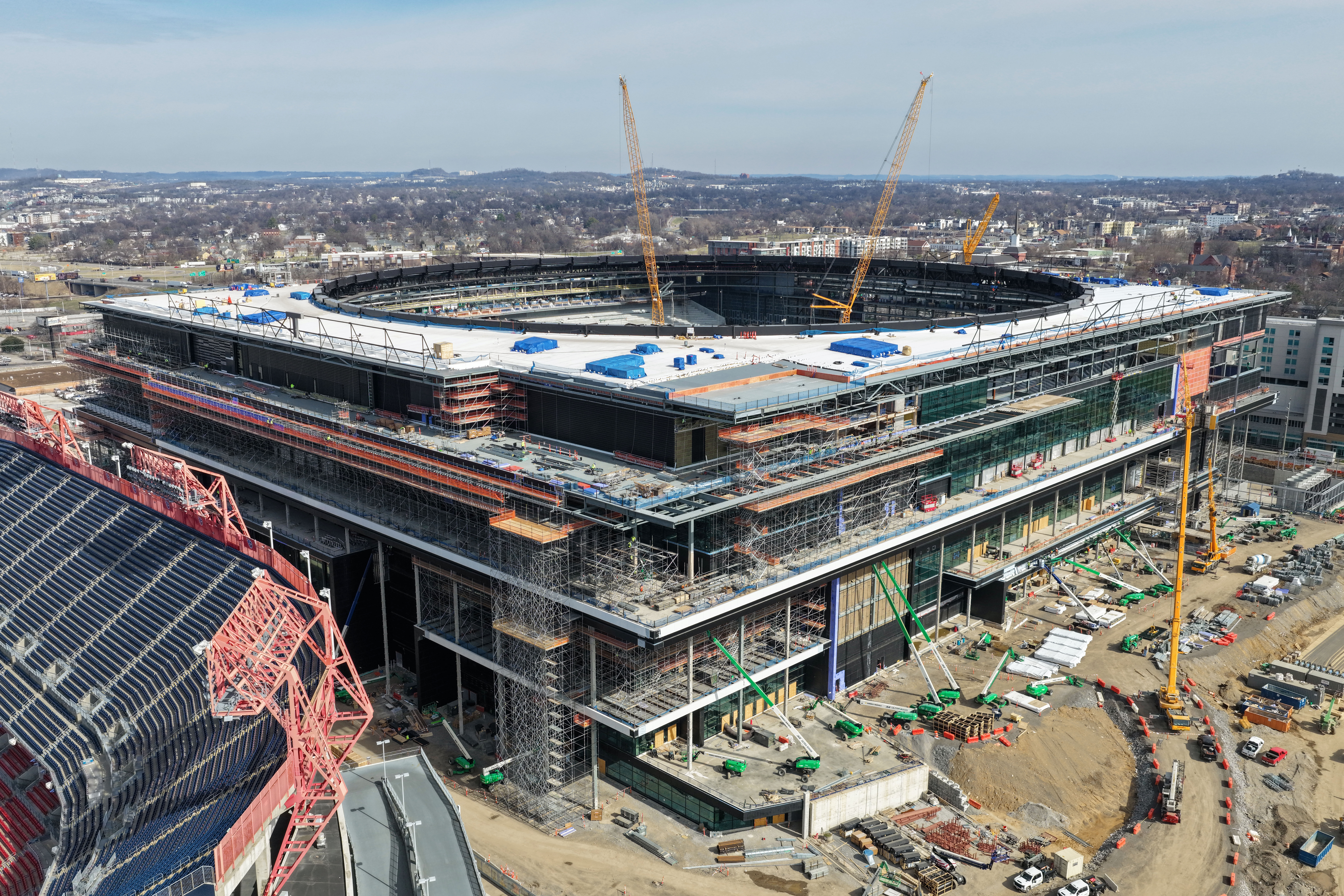
New Nissan Stadium under construction, February 2026

The league has made all decisions regarding hosting sites from Super Bowl LVII (held in February 2023) onward. There is no bidding process per site: the league selects a potential venue unilaterally, the chosen team puts together a hosting proposal, and then the league owners vote to determine whether it is acceptable. On May 19, 2026, the NFL announced that Super Bowl LXIV would be played at Nissan Stadium in Nashville, Tennessee, home of the Tennessee Titans, marking the first Super Bowl to be held in the state of Tennessee. The announcement was made when the stadium was still under construction, with it scheduled to open by the 2027 season.

== Broadcasting ==
=== United States ===
==== Television ====
Super Bowl LXIV will be televised nationally by NBC as part of the 11-year television contract, which allows a four-year rotation between CBS, Fox, NBC, and ABC/ESPN.. Under this rotation, NBC has the Super Bowl during the same years it has its Winter Olympics coverage. Super Bowl LXIV will be the third time that the game is scheduled on a date that falls within the date range of an ongoing Olympics event (and the fourth that the date will be on an Olympic year): the 2030 Winter Olympics in the French Alps.

==== Streaming ====
The game is planned to stream live on Peacock and NFL+.

==== Radio ====
Westwood One is planned to hold national rights to the game.

=== International ===
- In the United Kingdom and Ireland, the game will be televised on the free-to-air TBC.
- In Latin America, the game will be televised by TBC.
- In Germany and Austria, the game will be televised by TBC.
