= Nissan Stadium (2027) =

Future stadium in Nashville, Tennessee

- Conceptual rendering
- Interactive map of Nissan Stadium
- Former names: New Titans Stadium (construction)
- Location: Nashville, Tennessee, U.S.
- Coordinates: 36°10′03.8″N 86°46′05″W
- Owner: Government of Nashville
- Operator: Tennessee Titans
- Capacity: 60,000
- Roof: Skylight
- Surface: Artificial turf
- Public transit: WeGo Public Transit; Riverfront Station

Construction
- Groundbreaking: February 29, 2024
- Opened: 2027 (planned)
- Cost: US$2.1 billion
- Architect: Manica
- Structural engineer: Walter P Moore
- General contractors: Tennessee Builders Alliance (AECOM Hunt/Turner Construction/I.C.F. Builders/Polk & Associates)

Tenants
- Tennessee Titans (NFL) Planned; Tennessee State Tigers (NCAA) Planned; Music City Bowl (NCAA) Planned

Website
- newnissanstadium.com

Nissan Stadium is an indoor stadium in Nashville, Tennessee, U.S., scheduled to open in 2027. It will replace the existing Nissan Stadium as the home venue for the Tennessee Titans of the National Football League (NFL). The 60,000-seat stadium is projected to cost $2.1 billion, including $1.26 billion of public money—the largest stadium subsidy in U.S. history. It is being built next to the existing Nissan Stadium, which will be demolished after its completion. The stadium was designed by architectural firm Manica. The stadium will host Super Bowl LXIV in 2030.

== History ==
=== Background ===
Nissan Stadium, an open-air concrete-and-steel stadium that seats 69,000, has served as the home venue for the Tennessee Titans since its opening in 1999. The city hired an independent group, Venue Solutions Group (VSG), to assess its condition and the cost of maintaining it for the remainder of the lease, which ends in 2039. VSG's preliminary report concluded that it would cost the city between $1.75 and 1.95 billion to renovate Nissan Stadium as a "first class condition" facility.

=== Planning and construction ===
The $2.1 billion cost of the new stadium comes from:

- $840 million from the team
- $500 million from the state of Tennessee
- $760 million from revenue bonds issued by the Metro Sports Authority to be repaid via personal-seat license sales and taxes collected at the stadium and additional money from a new 1% hotel/motel tax.

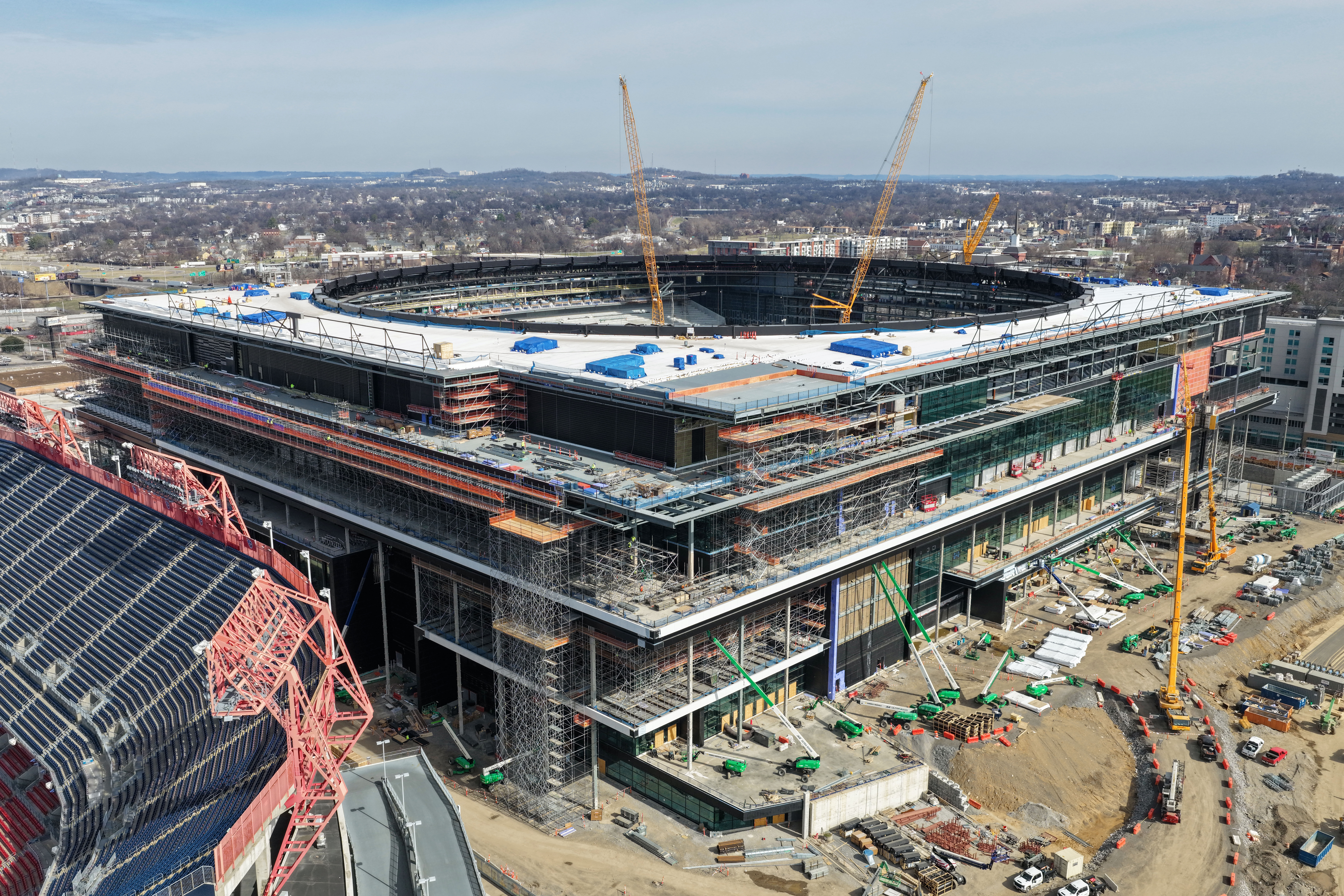
Aerial view of construction in early 2026

The financing program was confirmed by a 26–11 vote on April 25, 2023. Construction began in 2024.

The route of the IndyCar Series Music City Grand Prix, which ran on city streets, was originally to be changed during the new stadium's construction. However, on February 14, 2024, it was announced that the race would be moved to nearby Nashville Superspeedway, which also hosted the race in 2025 and 2026.

In July 2025, an empty noose was discovered, delaying construction of New Nissan Stadium while the Metropolitan Nashville Police Department investigated. On July 24, it was announced that no charges would be filed in the incident.

On May 19, 2026, it was announced that the stadium would host Super Bowl LXIV in 2030. The stadium will host Banana Bowl II, the BBCL championship game, on September 25, 2027.

Preceded by Nissan Stadium	Home of the Tennessee Titans; 2027 (planned)	Succeeded by none
