= NFL on Westwood One Sports =

American live sports commentary radio program

The NFL on Westwood One Sports is the branding for Cumulus Media subsidiary Westwood One's radio coverage of the National Football League (NFL). These games are distributed throughout the United States and Canada (the latter through TSN Radio). The broadcasts were previously branded with the CBS Radio and (for one season) Dial Global marques; CBS Radio was the original Westwood One's parent company and Dial Global purchased the company in 2011. Dial Global has since reverted its name to Westwood One after merging with Cumulus Media Networks.

Westwood One's package consists of every primetime regular season NFL broadcast (Sunday Night Football, Monday Night Football, Thursday Night Football), the opening game of the season, all NFL International Series games, any NFL game airing on Thanksgiving and Christmas Day, any late season Saturday NFL broadcasts, the Pro Bowl and all playoff games (including the Super Bowl). The network also carries the annual NFL Hall of Fame Game. Additionally, in some cases, the network also carries any postponed game broadcast nationally (as this was the case for the 2020 season, due to impacts from the ongoing COVID-19 pandemic).

== History of NFL games on Westwood One's predecessors ==
While major networks such as Westwood One, CBS, NBC, and Mutual held exclusive rights to most national broadcasts of the NFL throughout the league's history, Dial Global's predecessor, Jones Radio Networks, had carried several years' worth of Sunday afternoon games nationwide. Beginning in 2002, Jones carried game broadcasts from the Sports USA Radio Network. After Dial Global's massive acquisition spree of other networks began in 2008, Jones came under the Dial Global banner and Sports USA ended its relationship with the network. In 2009, Dial Global instead switched to Compass Media Networks for its Sunday afternoon NFL coverage.

=== Relationship to CBS ===
Westwood One had a long-standing relationship with CBS Radio. CBS' parent company owned the network for approximately ten years (1998–2008) and, through the CBS Radio Network, maintained control of the production of certain programming, including NFL games, an arrangement that continued following Westwood One's acquisition by Dial Global through the end of the 2011 NFL season. CBS had likely been carrying NFL games since at least 1935, when George A. Richards, owner of WJR and the Detroit Lions, switched WJR's affiliation from NBC Blue to CBS; Richards had negotiated with NBC the previous season to carry the Lions' Thanksgiving contest that year and likely carried those games over to CBS when he switched WJR's network.

As such, there was often synergy between the NFL on Westwood One and its former sister outlet, the NFL on CBS.

The theme music for The NFL on Westwood One from 2003 until the end of the 2012 season was "Posthumus Zone" by E.S. Posthumus, the same theme music used for the NFL on CBS television coverage (Westwood One's sports coverage had always used the appropriate CBS television theme for their sport where applicable). For the 2013 season onwards, a new radio-specific score was commissioned by the network. For Christmas Day games, the song "Christmas (Baby Please Come Home)" by Darlene Love is used for the opening introductions (alongside the usual clips from games broadcast on the network).

Some personnel is shared between the two units; for instance, certain CBS play-by-play announcers (e.g. Don Criqui, Dick Enberg and Ian Eagle) call select Sunday afternoon games throughout the first several weeks of the season on CBS and then switch to Thursday and Saturday night games on Westwood One. Boomer Esiason, who is an analyst for CBS' The NFL Today, called color commentary on Westwood One's Monday Night Football (and would often advertise the latter on the former, as "the Monday night game on Westwood One"); conversely, Steve Tasker, a color commentator for CBS's Sunday afternoon coverage, served as an analyst on The NFL on Westwood One shows.

The coverage carried the CBS Radio Sports tag (both with and without "Westwood One") for many years before switching to Westwood One. The Mutual Broadcasting System, purchased by Westwood One in 1985, also aired NFL coverage for many years beginning in 1940, while NBC Radio, purchased by Westwood One in 1987, had exclusive NFL coverage in 1985–86. Westwood One now acknowledges the NBC Radio broadcasts as part of the entire history of the network's football coverage.

In December 2008, it was reported that the NFL was considering leaving Westwood One for a rival service (ESPN Radio, Sports USA, and Sporting News Radio being the contenders), or possibly splitting rights for prime-time, Thanksgiving, and postseason games between two or more networks. However, on March 12, 2009, it was announced that Westwood One had signed a two-year extension with the NFL. The league then announced on December 22, 2010, that Westwood One's contract has been extended through 2014.

For 2009 and 2010, Westwood One also served as the distributor for the Sports USA network's NFL games after taking over the distribution rights from Dial Global. as such, Westwood One employed Sports USA announcers for certain games covered by the former network, including Thanksgiving Day games, the opening Monday night doubleheader, and Wild Card Weekend.

=== Sale of Westwood One to Dial Global and Cumulus ===
CBS Corporation sold off Westwood One to The Gores Group in 2007, who in turn sold it to Oaktree Capital Management (under the Dial Global brand) in 2011. Dial Global discontinued use of the Westwood One name during its ownership.

Although Dial Global's broadcasts continued to carry CBS branding and personalities through 2012, it was initially unclear whether or not this would continue in 2013. CBS is currently working with Cumulus Media Networks in distributing its own nationwide sports radio network, while Dial Global is distributing NBC's national sports network. Several of Dial Global's announcers (Kevin Harlan, Boomer Esiason, Dan Fouts, and Ian Eagle) are employed by CBS and Esiason is a contributor to CBS Sports Radio. The situation was mooted in August 2013, just weeks before the 2013 season started, when Cumulus agreed to acquire Dial Global's network assets; Townsquare Media, which had previously been in the same corporate structure as Dial Global, will acquire 53 of Cumulus's stations as part of the trade. Thus, CBS Sports' radio operations will once again be under the same management as the NFL package.

In 2014, Cumulus/Westwood One and the NFL agreed to an extension through the 2017 season.

Cumulus Media, Westwood One's owner, filed for Chapter 11 bankruptcy in November 2017 and began canceling its national broadcast contracts (beginning with that of Imus in the Morning) in January 2018. Cumulus's local sports rights, including affiliations with the Seattle Seahawks outside Seattle, and a long-unpaid debt to the Buffalo Bills, are among those Cumulus seeks to terminate in bankruptcy. At the same time, CBS's local radio operations, while still under the control of CBS's shareholders, were spun off and merged into Entercom (which later became Audacy in 2021). No contract extension has yet been announced as of May 2018; the NFL still recognizes Westwood One as a broadcast partner (for instance, San Diego's KWFN proclaimed that it would carry the package in the fall when it switched to a sports radio format in April 2018), and unlike in 2010, the league has not publicly solicited bids for a radio contract. The network confirmed it would continue carrying the league in 2021, with no statement as to how long the renewal would last.

In March 2022, Westwood One confirmed an extension of the radio rights for an unspecified multi-year length, which adds radio coverage of other NFL events such as the NFL draft and NFL Honors, as well as the expansion of rights to distribute its broadcasts via affiliates' digital platforms and the NFL's app, as well as the opportunity to develop alternative audio broadcasts (in the vein of CBS's Nickelodeon simulcasts and ESPN's Peyton and Eli and Megacast supplements for television) for games.

== Coverage overview ==
=== Sunday Night Football ===
==== Pregame ====
Westwood One's coverage of Sunday Night Football begins with their weekly recap show, NFL Sunday. The show begins at 7:30 p.m every Sunday night on most affiliates and is hosted by Scott Graham. The show consists of highlights and statistics from the previous games of the day as well as a preview of the upcoming Sunday night game live from the stadium.

For the 2006 season, NFL Sunday assumed a different format. The show was produced in conjunction with NBC Sports, used its John Williams-composed Sunday Night Football theme song, and was regarded as more of a radio version of the television network's Football Night in America pregame. Al Trautwig was the initial host of the program, and an analyst from NBC would offer his own take on the game to come. Incidental music for game highlights came from NFL Films’ library.

Trautwig left the show before the season ended for reasons unexplained; Scott Graham would eventually take his place after Chris Carlin substituted for two weeks. (He eventually became permanent host in 2009.)

==== Play-by-play ====
The play-by-play role for CBS Radio Sports' coverage of Sunday Night Football was originally filled by Jack Buck, who called the initial Sunday night games in 1987. Jim Nantz took over for Buck, who was already calling Monday Night Football for the network, the following season and announced games until 1990 when he was moved to television. Nantz was replaced by Howard David for 1991 and continued through 1995, after which he replaced the retiring Buck on Monday Night Football. Brad Sham was hired away from his job with the Dallas Cowboys to replace David for the 1996 season, and he stayed for that season and the following season before deciding to rejoin the Cowboys. Former NBC television announcer Joel Meyers then took over and stayed until the 2005 season when he was replaced by Sunday doubleheader voice Dave Sims, who had been his primary substitute. Sims remained in this role until the end of the 2012 season, when he traded places with Sunday doubleheader voice Kevin Kugler.

During Week 8 of the 2018 and 2019 seasons, Tom McCarthy substituted for Kugler as the latter was calling games for Fox. During week 11 of the 2019 season, McCarthy again substituted for Kugler, as he called the Monday Night game (Chiefs-Chargers) from Mexico City for the network.

For the 2020 season, after Fox Sports suspended Thom Brennaman for inappropriate comments he made on air in his other job as lead broadcaster for baseball's Cincinnati Reds, the network selected Kugler, who was employed by Fox already through his work on the Big Ten Network, to replace him on their Sunday NFL broadcasts (Kugler remains with the network for select games and as a substitute play-by-play announcer). Westwood One announced that due to the ongoing COVID-19 pandemic in the United States, they would utilize different broadcasters from week-to-week depending on where the game was emanating from.

Westwood One elected to go back to having a single lead broadcaster for its Sunday night coverage for 2022; on March 30, 2022, the network announced that Ryan Radtke, who had been serving as the network's lead college football broadcaster and was one of the announcers used in the rotation for 2021, would fill the role.

==== Color commentary ====
John Dockery was the initial color commentator for Sunday Night Football, serving under Buck and Nantz. Beginning in 1990, Pat Haden joined Dockery as color commentator. At the time, the Sunday night games were divided between Turner Sports, with games airing on TNT, and ESPN. Haden was TNT's television analyst and thus unavailable to do radio broadcasts until the network's slate of games had completed, so Dockery would serve an analyst for the radio broadcasts. Once ESPN took over coverage, Haden joined the radio team in place of Dockery. The arrangement lasted until the end of the 1997 season, after which ESPN claimed exclusivity over the Sunday night broadcast. Both Haden and Dockery left the network after that season.

Other color commentators include Bob Trumpy, who served as Sunday Night Football analyst from 2000 to 2004 and again from 2006 to 2007; John Riggins, who was the color man for the 2005 season; Jim Fassel, who was 2008's analyst; James Lofton, who replaced Fassel in 2009 after he left for a head coaching job in the United Football League. Jason Taylor replaced Lofton starting with the 2017 season due to Lofton moving to CBS television (Lofton remains with the network as a substitute analyst, primarily for its Monday Night Football coverage).

After not having a regular analyst for some time after Taylor left the broadcast, Westwood One decided to give the full-time position to Mike Golic, the former ESPN analyst and radio show host who had recently joined the network, for 2022.

=== Monday Night Football ===
The Monday Night Football broadcast on Westwood One features its lead broadcast team, as the network has long considered Monday night to be its flagship NFL broadcast, even as the NFL now considers the Sunday night game (since 2006 when NBC launched their Sunday night television package) its marquee "game of the week". As such, the team occupying this position stays together to call important playoff games and the Super Bowl.

==== Buck and Stram (1978–1985; 1987–1995) ====
For many years (beginning in 1978), the CBS Radio/Westwood One coverage of Monday Night Football was anchored by Jack Buck on play-by-play, with former Kansas City Chiefs coach Hank Stram alongside him in the color position. They stayed paired together for nearly every major game covered by the network from 1978 until Super Bowl XIX in January 1985. Since Westwood One now regards NBC Radio's coverage of Monday Night Football as part of its broadcast history Stram and Buck were regarded as temporarily replaced by Don Criqui and Bob Trumpy for the two years NBC Radio held the contract. Buck and Stram returned to the booth at the beginning of the 1987 season and stayed there until the end of the 1995 season, with Super Bowl XXX in January 1996 marking their final game as a broadcast team after sixteen total seasons on radio.

During their time as Monday Night Football lead broadcast team both Buck and Stram worked on the television side as well. Stram had served as a color commentator on The NFL on CBS prior to joining Buck on the radio and continued to do so from 1978 until CBS lost the rights to the NFL in 1993. Buck rejoined the CBS television coverage as a play-by-play man in 1982 (after having called games for the network from 1964 to 1974) and remained there until 1987. The duo worked together as a television broadcast team in 1982, 1983, and 1985.

==== David, Millen and Esiason (1996–2001) ====
To replace the departing Buck and Stram for 1996, Westwood One promoted Howard David from the Sunday Night Football broadcast and moved Matt Millen, who at the time was a color commentator for Fox and a contributor to the Westwood One Monday night pregame show, into the booth alongside him. Beginning in 1998 and continuing until 2001, David served as the play-by-play voice of the New York Jets for WFAN and later WABC, and would require a substitute when the Jets played on Monday night or in the playoffs. An example of the latter came in the 1998 NFC Championship Game; John Rooney substituted for an absent David in Minneapolis for Westwood One as he called that year's AFC Championship Game for WFAN from Denver.

Boomer Esiason joined David and Millen for the 2000 season after being fired by ABC from the Monday Night Football telecast. It was the last season in the booth for Millen as he departed to take a position as President of the Detroit Lions, a job which he received great criticism in and was eventually fired from in 2008.

In 2001, David and Esiason were joined by CBS Sports' veteran reporter Lesley Visser, who became the first woman to be an analyst on an NFL broadcast. Visser had previously become the first female sportscaster to preside over the Vince Lombardi Trophy presentation, while covering Super Bowl XXVI for CBS television in 1992. The pairing only lasted the one season, as Visser decided to leave the booth to focus on her reporting for both CBS and HBO. It was also David's last season calling games for Westwood One until his 2009 return, as he became a full-time sports talk show host in Miami and the voice of the Miami Dolphins beginning in 2002.

==== Albert and Esiason (2002–2009) ====
For the 2002 season Westwood One chose veteran broadcaster Marv Albert, who had last called NFL games for NBC in 1997 and was best known for his NBA broadcasting for NBC, TNT, and (at the time) the New York Knicks. Esiason stayed on to be his color commentator. Since Esiason also joined The NFL Today broadcast team for the 2002 season and CBS (at the time) traveled to the site of the AFC Championship Game, Albert and Esiason became the exclusive voices of the game. To accomplish this Esiason would call the end of each half with a wireless microphone so he could save time to go to the field level set CBS used for these games. Esiason has also done this in years CBS has carried the Super Bowl, but has not done this for the AFC Championship game since the 2005 game in Denver as CBS has not traveled to the AFC Championship since (until 2016).

Beginning in 2007, Westwood One has employed a series of substitute analysts for Monday Night Football. This was a change necessitated by the premiere of the Boomer and Carton morning show on the network's flagship station, New York's WFAN, which saw Esiason and Craig Carton take over the station's morning show following Don Imus' firing and a job which, when combined with his CBS duties, has Esiason in New York six days a week. Esiason employs a private jet service to get him to and from Monday night games outside the New York-Philadelphia areas, but for games that require significant travel (e.g. west coast games, certain games outside the Northeastern U.S. or games held outside the U.S.) he is unable to return to New York in enough time to rest and be ready for the start of Boomer and Carton at 6:00 am, thus requiring a fill-in analyst for those games.

Initially, Albert called the game with a rotating series of guest analysts on weeks that Esiason was unavailable. Beginning in 2009, Westwood One appointed Kevin Harlan and Warren Moon to serve as the backup broadcast team, with Harlan substituting for Albert on games he was unable to make due to other commitments (a role formally filled by Dave Sims) and Moon substituting for Esiason.

The pairing ended following the 2009 NFL season, with Albert's last call being Super Bowl XLIV in Miami. On June 4, 2010, Albert announced that he was leaving Westwood One to focus on his NBA broadcasting duties for TNT and the YES Network. In 2011, he returned to calling NFL games for CBS television.

==== Harlan and Esiason (2010–2017) ====
On June 29, 2010, it was announced that Kevin Harlan would be succeeding Albert as Westwood One's primary play-by-play voice for Monday Night Football, with Esiason continuing as color commentator. In 2010, Randy Cross served as Esiason's substitute for select games, while Wayne Larrivee filled in on play-by-play when Harlan was unavailable. The following year, Dan Fouts replaced Cross as substitute analyst and stayed until 2014 when Kurt Warner replaced him.

===== 2016 substitutions =====
In 2016, for the first time since being employed by the network, Esiason did not call the opening game of the season as it took place in Denver. Regular substitute Kurt Warner filled in for Esiason. During Week 7 of the same season neither Harlan or Esiason was available for the Monday Night game, Kevin Kugler filled in for Harlan as he was calling the International Series game in London, England for NFL Network, with Kurt Warner also filling in for Esiason (despite Kugler and Warner, the latter filling in for James Lofton, calling the Sunday Night Football game the previous night). For the Week 11 Monday Night game (Texans-Raiders) being played in Mexico City, Armando Quintero and Benny Ricardo (both Mexican-Americans) called the game instead of Harlan and Esiason/Warner. Kugler and Warner would again call the Week 16 Monday Night game (Lions-Cowboys), with Kugler filling in for Harlan as the latter called the Christmas Night game (Broncos-Chiefs) in Kansas City (where Harlan resides in) with Lofton.

==== Harlan and Warner (2018–present) ====
On August 9, 2018, it was announced that Kurt Warner would be succeeding Esiason as Westwood One's primary color commentator for Monday Night Football ending Esiason's 18-year reign in the Monday Night Football booth, with Harlan continuing as play-by-play announcer. However, Esiason called the opening game of the 2018 season (Falcons-Eagles) as his final game for the network.

For the opening-week Monday night doubleheader, the primary team initially split up to cover the two games. In 2014, for example, Esiason joined Ian Eagle to call the early game while Harlan teamed with James Lofton on the broadcast of the late game. However, this was no longer the case as of the 2018 season due to Esiason's departure, with Harlan and Warner calling the late game.

==== Pregame and halftime show host ====
The Monday Night Football pregame and halftime shows are conducted differently from usual pregames, as there is no other game action to recap. Jim Gray presided over both the pregame and halftime shows, which are more feature driven and often feature guest commentators such as Tom Brady and Larry Fitzgerald, who contributes to the pregame show weekly with predictions and commentary. In addition to the Monday night games, Gray also hosted the studio shows for the Thursday opening game and the Super Bowl. For the Monday Night game held in Mexico during Week 11 of the 2016 season, Scott Graham co-hosted the pregame and halftime shows with Gray. Starting with the 2021 season, NFL Network host Rich Eisen succeeded Gray on this role while, in-turn, also relocating the Monday Night pregame/halftime coverage to Los Angeles from the network's New York City studios. Gray, Fitzgerald and Brady have since started a podcast titled Let's Go!, which airs on Mondays during the season on SiriusXM NFL Radio prior to the game broadcasts. For 2025, Mike Golic and his son Mike Golic Jr. succeeded Eisen in this role while also extending the pregame show to 60 minutes. For 2026, Jamie Erdahl and Doug Pederson succeeded the Golics in this role.

Steve Tasker serves as the sideline reporter for Monday Night Football. John Dockery served as sideline reporter from 1999 to 2007. From 2008 to 2012, there was no official sideline reporter for Monday Night Football.

==== Spanish language ====
In 2005, Westwood One carried an alternate Spanish-language feed featuring Clemson Smith-Muniz as play-by-play host and David Crommett as commentator. Those broadcasts have moved to United Stations Radio Networks.

=== Thursday Night Football ===
In addition to its Sunday and Monday night coverage, Westwood One also is the radio home for Thursday Night Football. Westwood One and its predecessors have always aired Thursday games in the past, but until 2006 those games were usually limited to Thanksgiving, rarely scheduled midweek games, and the season opening game beginning in 2002.

When Thursday Night Football was added to the NFL schedule permanently, Westwood One created a specific broadcast team to cover it. From 2006 until 2008, Dick Enberg was the play-by-play man. Sam Wyche was the initial color analyst, and Dennis Green replaced him after the 2006 season.

From 2009-2024, Ian Eagle has been the voice of Thursday Night Football for Westwood One and Dave Pasch, Tom McCarthy or Brandon Gaudin has worked as a backup play by play man for Thursday Night Football in 2021. After Dennis Green left to take the head coaching position with the United Football League's California Redwoods in 2008, Fox television analyst Trent Green replaced him and stayed on until the end of the 2013 season when Mike Mayock took over.

As of 2022, Eagle's analyst is Tony Boselli. The backup announcers for 2022 will be Kevin Kugler (play by play) and Jason McCourty (analyst).

Since the 2025 season, due to Eagle’s commitments for NBA on Prime Video, Westwood One used alternating play-by-play announcers for Thursday games on a weekly basis.

=== Saturday games ===
When the NFL expanded its weekly games into Thursday nights on a regular basis, a package of Saturday night games was added as part of it and the entire broadcast package was titled Run to the Playoffs. As Westwood One had already had rights to the late season Saturday afternoon tripleheaders through 2005, the network retained its rights when the Saturday action was reduced to one game.

For the first two seasons, where three Saturday Night Football games were broadcast, Westwood One carried a separate broadcast team for those games. Joel Meyers called the games the first year while Don Criqui called them the second. When the Saturday night action became infrequent, Westwood One opted to not have a specific team to cover those matchups.

As of 2021, Westwood One carries all late season Saturday doubleheaders, with few exceptions mainly due to exclusivity (e.g. the 49ers-Cardinals matchup during Week 16 of the 2020 season, as the game was exclusive to Amazon Prime Video).

=== Former Sunday doubleheader coverage ===
Prior to 2018, The NFL on Westwood One featured two games each week from the Sunday afternoon lineup, with one beginning at 1:00 pm and one at 4:25 pm. Westwood One marketed these games as "tripleheaders" when also including the Sunday Night Football broadcasts.

During the 2013 season, due to the rescheduling of the San Diego Chargers–Oakland Raiders Week 5 game to 8:25 pm PDT, the network had obtained the rights to broadcast that game nationally, forming a quadrupleheader. The "quadrupleheader" process would continue on Week 8 of the 2014 season, during Weeks 4, 7 and 8 of the 2015–16 seasons and during weeks 4 & 8 of the 2017 season, all of which are due to the network carrying the NFL International Series games in England on those weeks (all with 9:30 am EST (2:30 pm local time) start times).

==== Broadcast teams ====
Westwood One employed two separate broadcast teams for the Sunday doubleheader. Over the years, the lead announcers included Harry Kalas, Howard David, Dave Sims, and Bill Rosinski among others. Analysts included Trev Alberts, Dan Reeves, Jim Fassel, Mark Malone, Tony Boselli, Jack Ham, and Rod Woodson.

NFL Films narrator Scott Graham hosted all studio segments for the Sunday games on Westwood One, having taken this position once previous host Tommy Tighe moved to ESPN Radio. In addition to his studio duties, Graham would also provide play-by-play on certain games. In such cases, either Jason Horowitz replaced him in the studio or Graham did the studio segments on-site. After Jim Gray's departure just before the 2021 season, Graham hosted the pre-game/halftime for that season's Super Bowl alongside Willie McGinest.

=== Playoff coverage ===
For the first two rounds of the playoffs, often the regular broadcast teams are mixed, due to Boomer Esiason's unavailability. During the wild card and divisional weekends, there are four games, therefore four separate crews are needed. Some of the other established crews call the less-popular games. For instance, in 2007, Dick Enberg and Dennis Green (from the Thursday night crew) called one of the wild card games, and Marv Albert called games alongside Jim Fassel from the Sunday doubleheader team. In 2009, the teams were even more mixed – for example, Marv Albert called an opening round game with Dennis Green and a divisional playoff game with Warren Moon.

Historically, the first time the main crews were together came during Conference Championship weekend, since Boomer Esiason had commitments with The NFL Today. When he joined the CBS studio show, the crew traveled to the site of the AFC Championship Game every year; this meant the Monday night crew would be exclusively responsible for calling the game. CBS has not chosen to travel to the sites of the AFC Championship Game from 2006 to 2015, so Esiason stayed behind in New York with the NFL Today panel. In the first of those two seasons Marv Albert called the 2007 game in Indianapolis alongside Sam Wyche.

In 2008, neither Albert nor Esiason was available on championship weekend, so Dave Sims and Bob Trumpy moved to the AFC Championship Game in New England while Bill Rosinski took Albert's place alongside Jim Fassel for the NFC Championship Game in Green Bay. For 2009, Albert returned to the booth for Championship Sunday, calling the NFC Championship Game alongside Fassel with Dave Sims and Dennis Green responsible for the AFC Championship Game. The 2010 Conference Championship Games saw Kevin Harlan and Warren Moon call the AFC Championship Game while Sims and James Lofton called the NFC championship Game.

The broadcast teams have stayed together throughout the playoffs; this was made simpler with the addition of a permanent backup analyst for Monday Night Football.

For 2016, Harlan and Esiason called the AFC Championship Game, as CBS will be traveling to the 2016 AFC Championship Game in Denver for the first time since 2006, allowing Esiason to work both his NFL Today and radio duties on-site. While Kevin Kugler and James Lofton will be calling the NFC Championship game.

For the 2019 playoffs, NBC's Mike Tirico and ESPN's Brian Griese called the Saturday AFC wild card game, owing to the reduction of Westwood One to three announce teams for the primetime games in the regular season, who then covered the remainder of Wild Card Weekend's four games.

Due to the expanded playoffs in 2021, which resulted in six games during Wild Card Weekend, Westwood One called in many of its backup announcers to cover the full slate of games. For the first tripleheader on Saturday, John Sadak and Ross Tucker call Colts-Bills, Ryan Radtke and Mike Holmgren call Rams-Seahawks, and Kevin Harlan and Ron Jaworski call Buccaneers-Washington. On Sunday, Brandon Gaudin and Rod Woodson call Ravens-Titans, Kevin Kugler and James Lofton call Bears-Saints, and Kevin Harlan and Tony Boselli call Browns-Steelers.

=== Other programming ===
Westwood One, in addition to its game coverage and highlight show on Sundays, Mondays, and Thursdays, offers to affiliate stations four different NFL-related programs during the season leading up to the Super Bowl. The first to premiere is Fantasy Football Forecast, originally an hour-long weekly program hosted by Kevin Kugler and James Lofton regarding fantasy leagues. This program premieres in late August and runs until the final week of the season and is now a two-minute feature hosted by Jason Horowitz.

A second program, NFL Insider, runs from the beginning of the season through to the Super Bowl, is a program hosted by Scott Graham, where he provided analysis of the week, present highlights of the previous week's action, and interview players and coaches.

Scott Graham and Mike Golic host an NFL preview show every week (appropriately called NFL Preview), where they analyze each game in depth and provide information about what players and other factors will play roles in the upcoming week. This program runs through Super Bowl Sunday and is thirty minutes in length, but runs for an hour leading into the Super Bowl.

A live radio version of The NFL Today runs every Sunday morning before the main CBS version during the season, hosted by Amber Theoharis alongside rotating analysts.

Warner also hosts a weekly podcast The Kurt Warner QB Podcast (named after Warner himself), where he and Kevin Harlan analyze and review quarterback plays throughout the season.

During the first months of the COVID-19 pandemic, the network also re-broadcast select NFL postseason games from past seasons, including Super Bowl I, Super Bowl XLII, and Super Bowl LIV.

Under the NFL's 2022 contract with Westwood One, it will also provide coverage of other "tentpole" events such as the NFL draft combine, the NFL draft, the schedule release, and the NFL Honors.

== Announcers ==
=== Play-by-play ===
- Jason Benetti: play-by-play select assignments
- Noah Eagle: play-by-play select assignments
- Nate Gatter: play-by-play select assignments
- Scott Graham: lead Studio Host, and play-by-play select assignments
- Jason Horowitz: play-by-play select assignments
- Kevin Kugler: lead Thursday Night Football, and select Monday Night Football play-by-play
- Kevin Harlan: lead Monday Night Football play-by-play
- Tom McCarthy: play-by-play select assignments
- Ryan Radtke: lead Sunday Night Football play-by-play
- John Sadak: play-by-play select assignments
- Kate Scott: play-by-play select assignments
- JP Shadrick: play-by-play select assignments
- Oliver Wilson: lead NFL International Series play-by-play

=== Studio host ===
- Scott Graham: lead Studio Host, and play-by-play select assignments

=== Game analysts ===
- Charles Arbuckle: analyst select assignments
- Byron Chamberlain: analyst select assignments
- Erik Coleman: analyst select assignments
- Ryan Fitzpatrick: analyst select assignments
- Mike Golic: lead Sunday Night Football analyst
- Dante Hall: analyst select assignments
- Ryan Harris: analyst select assignments
- Torry Holt: analyst select assignments
- Mike Mayock: analyst select assignments
- Devin McCourty: analyst select assignments
- Brian Mitchell: analyst select assignments
- Derek Rackley: analyst select assignments
- Marcel Reece: analyst select assignments
- Kyle Rudolph: analyst select assignments
- Ross Tucker: lead Thursday Night Football analyst
- Kurt Warner: lead Monday Night Football analyst

=== 2020 adjustments ===
As mentioned above, the Sunday NFL broadcasts had been affected due to the COVID-19 pandemic and the move of Kevin Kugler to Fox television for the season. Thus, Westwood One employed a different arrangement that will feature different broadcasters from week to week based on geography. This arrangement was then extended to Monday and Thursday night broadcasts for select games.

- In Week 2, Westwood One's lead college football voice Ryan Radtke called the matchup between the New England Patriots and Seattle Seahawks. Mike Holmgren, former Seahawks coach and sometimes guest analyst on Westwood One broadcasts, served as color commentator.
- In Week 3, Madden NFL commentator Brandon Gaudin was the play-by-play announcer for both the Thursday (Dolphins-Jaguars; with Derek Rackley) and Sunday night (Packers-Saints; with Rod Woodson) games. Ian Eagle and Tony Boselli, the Thursday Night Football crew, called the Monday night game (Chiefs-Ravens).
- In Week 5, Kevin Harlan and Ben Leber called the Thursday Night game (Buccaneers-Bears).
- In Week 6, Sunday/Thursday night pregame host Scott Graham called one game of an impromptu Monday night doubleheader (Chiefs-Bills, which was postponed from the originally scheduled Thursday night), alongside Ross Tucker.
- In Week 8, Brandon Gaudin and Tony Boselli called the Thursday night game (Falcons-Panthers). Regular substitute Tom McCarthy (also a play-by-play announcer for the Philadelphia Phillies) and Ross Tucker called the Sunday night game (Cowboys-Eagles). Ian Eagle and Ron Jaworski, a former Monday Night Football analyst for ESPN, called the Monday night game (Buccaneers-Giants).
- In Week 9, Ryan Radtke and Rod Woodson called the Thursday night game (Packers-49ers). Brandon Gaudin and Derek Rackley called the Sunday night game (Saints-Buccaneers).
- In Week 12, Kevin Harlan and Ron Jaworski called the Monday night game (Seahawks-Eagles). Kenny Albert, who normally calls NHL games for the network, and Anthony Becht called a Wednesday afternoon game (Ravens-Steelers, which was originally scheduled as the Thanksgiving night game but was postponed multiple times).
- In Week 13, Scott Graham and Ross Tucker called a Tuesday night game (Cowboys-Ravens, which was originally scheduled as a Thursday night game).
- In Week 14, CBS Sports' Spero Dedes and Terrell Davis called the Thursday night game (Patriots-Rams). Tom McCarthy and Ross Tucker called the Sunday Night game (Steelers-Bills).
- In Week 15, Ryan Radtke and Kurt Warner called the Thursday night game (Chargers-Raiders). Radtke and Rod Woodson called the first Saturday game (Bills-Broncos) while former Sunday doubleheader voice John Sadak and Shaun O'Hara called the second game (Panthers-Packers). Tom McCarthy and Ross Tucker called the Sunday night game (Browns-Giants).
- In Week 16, Scott Graham and Ross Tucker called the Christmas Day game (Vikings-Saints). During the Saturday tripleheader, John Sadak and Jim Miller called the first game (Buccaneers-Lions) while Ryan Radtke and Rod Woodson called the last game (Dolphins-Raiders); Westwood One did not produce a feed of the 49ers-Cardinals matchup. Brandon Gaudin and Ben Leiber called the Sunday night game (Titans-Packers); while Tom McCarthy and Ross Tucker called the Monday night game (Bills-Patriots).

== Availability ==
For the Conference Championship games and the Super Bowl, most affiliate radio stations of the participating teams' networks must accept the feed from Westwood One. Only the flagship stations (in both English and other languages) can transmit the team's local radio broadcast, although the local broadcasts are also available on SiriusXM and NFL Game Pass. An exception is made for the Green Bay Packers because they technically have flagships in two separate cities, WTAQ-AM-FM and WIXX in Green Bay and WRNW in Milwaukee. If the local Westwood One affiliate is not the same as the corresponding affiliate of the team, the Westwood One station retains broadcast rights and the team's station must switch to alternate programming (for example, KSPN in Los Angeles aired an alternate feed of ESPN Radio on January 20, 2008 when the San Diego Chargers played in the AFC Championship Game, as exclusive rights belonged to KLAC, the Chargers' L.A. affiliate. The same situation occurred in 2011 with WAPL as part of the Packers example above; although that station is licensed to Appleton south of Green Bay, the station transmits from the same site as WIXX, but as it is an 'out-of-market' station according to NFL rules, carried the Westwood One call rather than the Packers home call during the NFC Championship Game and Super Bowl XLV, thus providing a choice of call for the Green Bay market).

For all other weeks, within 75 miles of a team's stadium, only stations the team or its flagship station contracts with can carry those games, regardless if the team is home or away. Thus, any competing station that carries Westwood One broadcasts cannot air those games- for instance, any time the New York Jets are playing on Sunday or Monday nights, their games do not air on New York City's Westwood One affiliate, WFAN, as exclusive rights to the game broadcast lie with the Jets' flagship WEPN-FM (In the case of the Sunday doubleheaders, most stations can opt for an alternate national broadcast from the Sports USA Radio Network or, beginning in 2009, Compass Media Networks.) This rule applies to Toronto, Canada whenever the Buffalo Bills play nationally. (However, in the case of Toronto, the same station affiliates with both the Bills radio network and Dial Global, which means the only difference is which broadcast team the station uses). For a time before the most recent moves of the Los Angeles Chargers and Rams, the rule applied to the Los Angeles market, but it was relaxed in 2008 and all national radio broadcasts were available in that market on KLAC (Dial Global) and KFWB (Sports USA Radio) until the Rams returned to the market on KSPN in 2016.

The NFL on Westwood One was not available on the NFL Game Pass (formerly Audio Pass) subscription service, though the network's prime time and playoff broadcasts became available beginning in the 2009 NFL season as a result of a new broadcast contract. All prime time and playoff broadcasts are carried on Sirius XM NFL Radio. Officially, games could not be streamed on internet radio by affiliates per NFL rules.

In 2022, it was announced that Westwood One games will now be able to be streamed for free via their affiliates' digital platforms, as well as the NFL mobile app.

=== Current terrestrial affiliates ===
This is an incomplete list of NFL on Westwood One Sports terrestrial± affiliates across the United States. Programming is subject to local blackouts, their own game broadcasts for their local teams, and other station programming.

Market	Sunday Afternoon Doubleheaders	Primetime and Playoffs
New York City	WFAN/660 & WFAN-FM/101.9	
Los Angeles	KABC/790	
Chicago	WSCR/670	
San Francisco	KNRB/680	
Dallas–Fort Worth	KTCK/1310 & KTCK-FM/96.7 (primary); KLIF/570 (secondary)	
Houston	KILT/610	
Washington, D.C.	WJFK-FM/106.7; WJFK/1580	
Philadelphia	WIP-FM/94.1 (primary); WTEL/610 (secondary)	
Atlanta	WZGC-FM/92.9	
Atlantic City	WENJ/97.3	
Boston		WEEI-FM/93.7
Pittsburgh	KDKA-FM/93.7 (primary); KDKA/1020 (secondary)	
Miami–Fort Lauderdale	WQAM/560; WQAM-FM/104.3	
Detroit	WXYT/1270	WXYT-FM/97.1
Columbus	WBNS-FM/97.1 (primary); WBNS/1460 (secondary)	
Milwaukee	WRNW/97.3	
Cleveland	WKRK-FM/92.3	
Seattle	KJR/950 & 95.7 HD2	
Phoenix		KQFN/1580
Minneapolis–Saint Paul	KFXN-FM/100.3; KTLK/1130	
San Diego–Tijuana	KWFN/97.3	
Tampa–St. Petersburg	WHBO/1040	
Nashville, Tennessee	WGFX-FM/104.5	
Denver		KEPN/1600
Orlando	WDBO/580	
Sacramento	KHTK/1140	
St. Louis	WXOS/101	
Portland, Oregon	KXTG/750	
Charlotte	WFNZ/610	
Indianapolis	WIBC/93.1	
Baltimore	WJZ/1300	WJZ-FM/105.7
Raleigh–Durham	WDNC/620	
Salt Lake City	KZNS/1280; KZNS-FM/97.5	
Madison	WTSO/1070	
Green Bay	WDUZ/1400 & WFUZ-FM/107.5	
Lakeshore	WOMT/1240 & WOMT-FM/107.5	
