= NFL on television in the 2000s =

Recently, the NFL's TV broadcasters have suffered annual financial losses because advertising revenue is unable to keep up with the rising costs of broadcast rights.

Nevertheless, the current broadcast contract, which began in 2006, resulted in a sizable increase in total rights fees. Both Fox and CBS renewed their Sunday afternoon broadcast packages through 2011, in both cases with modest increases. Furthermore, the league and DirecTV signed a five-year extension to their exclusivity deal on NFL Sunday Ticket.

Despite relatively high, if declining, TV ratings, ABC decided to end its relationship with the NFL after losing significant money on Monday Night Football. In addition to the fees, part of this decision may have been the result of a resurgent ABC prime time entertainment schedule during the 2004–05 season, particularly on Sunday evening with Desperate Housewives; thus ABC would be unable to satisfy the league's reported preference for a Sunday night game on broadcast television as opposed to Monday.

Because of that, Monday Night Football moved from ABC to ESPN, which are both owned by The Walt Disney Company. The cable network paid $1.1 billion per year from 2006 to 2014 for the rights. Unlike the broadcast networks, however, ESPN can generate revenue from subscription sales, in addition to traditional commercial breaks (ESPN's subscriber fees are the highest of any American cable network, more than four times that of second-place TNT). The cable network's coverage begins at 1:00 p.m. ET with SportsCenter Special Edition: Monday Night Kickoff. The 2009 edition saw the game itself start at 8:30 p.m., with Mike Tirico, Ron Jaworski, and Jon Gruden in the broadcast booths.

Meanwhile, NBC, after losing the AFC package to CBS in 1997, was able to reclaim some broadcast rights with a deal worth an average of $650 million per year to air the Sunday night package from 2006 to 2014 (not much more than what ESPN used to pay for the same rights). This new deal included the Super Bowl in 2009 and 2012.

NBC's coverage also includes two preseason games (including the annual Hall of Fame Game), the first two Wild Card playoff games of each post-season, and the annual Thursday opening Kickoff Game, similar to ABC's broadcast rights package. The major difference was that the NFL allowed NBC flexibility in selecting games in the latter part of the season. ABC did not have the right to be flexible with their Monday Night Football schedule and picked matchups based on a team's record in the previous season (as NBC does), which often led to teams with losing records playing each other on Monday night later in the season.

The moves were intended to break NBC out of its ratings slump; however, at one point in the last decade, this did not happen, and although NBC Sunday Night Football had been (and continues to be) the network's top rated program and in the top 30 for viewing audience, it had not lifted the rest of the schedule. For a time, NBC had been firmly in fourth place and was losing large sums of money, so much so that the network had to cut an hour of prime time programming from its weeknight schedule in favor of The Jay Leno Show, a somewhat lower budget talk show which lasted five months. The network has since slowly come back to second place in the network ratings.

== Year-by-year breakdown ==
=== 2000 ===
Unexpectedly, comedian Dennis Miller joined the Monday Night Football cast in 2000, along with Dan Fouts. The move was ultimately regarded as a bust by many viewers and commentators. ABC briefly considered adding radio personality Rush Limbaugh before Miller was added to the broadcast team, despite having no prior sports broadcast experience (Limbaugh would instead be assigned as a commentator to Sunday NFL Countdown on ABC sister ESPN). Miller demonstrated a knowledge of the game and its personalities, although at times he tended to lapse into sometimes obscure analogy-riddled streams of consciousness similar to the "rants" of his standup comedy act. ABC even set up a webpage dedicated to explaining Miller's sometimes obscure pop culture references. Soon, it would become apparent that Miller's comedy did not mix with football.

In June 2000, Lesley Visser's career suffered a highly publicized setback when she was famously bounced as the Monday Night Football sideline reporter for a less experienced, much younger woman and a man, who did not have as extensive journalistic credentials as Visser. "It was staggering to me", Visser later recalled. However, she wound up returning to CBS Sports, philosophical as ever. "You can have a short career if it's based on looks and youth", she said, "but legitimacy is what lasts." Which ABC replaced her with both Melissa Stark and Eric Dickerson. This was part of the overhaul when ABC brought back Don Ohlmeyer to serve as producer, who installed Dennis Miller as an analyst (for ultimately two unsuccessful seasons). She sued ABC Sports for age discrimination, with Howard Katz and Ohlmeyer being named as co-defendants.

As previously mentioned, in 2000, Don Ohlmeyer, the program's producer up until 1977 was brought back. After spending time at NBC, Ohlmeyer was lured out of retirement to spark interest and provide some vigor to the broadcast. Besides the on-air talent, Ohlmeyer's changes included clips of players introducing themselves, new graphics and music. In another rather irreverent move, the scoring bug began incorporating nicknames for the teams, such as "Skins" and "Fins" (for the Washington Redskins and Miami Dolphins) instead of their respective common abbreviations, WSH and MIA.

On October 23, 2000, the New York Jets and Miami Dolphins competed in what is now known as The Monday Night Miracle. Trailing 30–7 in the fourth quarter, Vinny Testaverde led the Jets to score 23 consecutive points to tie the game. After Miami scored another touchdown, Testaverde threw to offensive tackle Jumbo Elliott to tie the game at 37-all. At 1:08 a.m. Eastern Time, the game having crossed into Tuesday morning, John Hall kicked a field goal in overtime to win the game 40–37. It was the second biggest fourth quarter comeback in NFL history and biggest comeback in Jets' history. Arnold Schwarzenegger predicted the comeback at halftime, where he was appearing with the MNF crew to promote his upcoming movie, The 6th Day. With the Jets already down by 20 points he said, "Wayne Chrebet will catch a pass and the Jets will win. They're a great team."

=== 2001 ===
On January 28, 2001, CBS Sports, Core Digital and Princeton Video Image introduced state-of-the-art, three-dimensional replay technology called "EyeVision" for its coverage of Super Bowl XXXV in Tampa (at Raymond James Stadium). The game, CBS Sports' first Super Bowl broadcast since 1992, drew 131.2 million viewers for the Baltimore Ravens win over the New York Giants. As a result, Super Bowl XXXV was the most watched television program that year. Play-by-play announcer Greg Gumbel became the first African-American announcer to call a major sports championship; he was joined in the broadcast booth with Phil Simms. Both of the Ravens' Super Bowl championships to date have been on CBS; the CBS-owned station in Baltimore, WJZ-TV, had been, as an ABC affiliate, one of the strongest TV stations for Monday Night Football for most of the 1980s and early 1990s, due to Baltimore's previous NFL team, the Colts' move to Indianapolis.

For the 2001 NFL season, the program moved part-time from the CBS Broadcast Center to a new outdoor studio on the site of the General Motors Building, on 5th Avenue and 59th Street in Manhattan. The set, which was used during the fall, was set up on Sunday mornings at a plaza in the area near the building that later became the reflecting glass structure of the Apple Fifth Avenue store, next to the southeast corner of Central Park. During the winter, The NFL Today was broadcast indoors from Studio 43 at the CBS Broadcast Center.

The 2001 season of MNF featured a season-long campaign promoting the anticipated 20,000th point scored in MNF history. Denver Broncos kicker Jason Elam completed the task with a field goal during a 38–28 loss at Oakland on November 5. The three points also put Elam over 1,000 points for his career. In addition, the scoring bug reverted to using the team abbreviations, as opposed to the nickname scheme used in the previous season.

The 2001–02 NFL playoffs marked the first time that the league scheduled prime time playoff games for the first two rounds, in an attempt to attract more viewers. Saturday wild card and divisional playoff games were moved from 12:30 and 4:00 p.m. Eastern Time to 4:30 and 8:00 p.m., respectively. As a result, the league abandoned its practice of scheduling playoff games held mainly in colder, northern regions for daylight hours only; any stadium, regardless of evening January temperatures, could host prime time playoff games.

=== 2002 ===
In 2002, the NFL began scheduling a Thursday night special opening "Kickoff" game, taking place on the Thursday after Labor Day leading into the opening Sunday slate of NFL games. The event includes a pre-game concert and other televised festivities. The first series of these events were held in New York and Washington, D.C., respectively, to celebrate both cities' resilience in the wake of the September 11, 2001 attacks. The 2002 San Francisco 49ers and the New York Giants game was held on September 5 and televised on ESPN. The 2003 edition featured the Washington Redskins hosting the New York Jets on September 4, 2003, and the game was televised by ABC. Since 2006, NBC has televised the Kickoff game (see below).

The NFL Today was rebooted again after the 2001 season with Dan Marino and Boomer Esiason joining Nantz and Sanders. Sanders left the broadcast team after Super Bowl XXXVIII to return to the NFL, playing for the Baltimore Ravens until 2004. Nantz followed shortly thereafter, being promoted to lead play-by-play broadcaster.

In 2002, the Monday Night Football broadcast debuted the "Horse Trailer" award, in which a picture of the game's top performer(s) is displayed, as chosen by the broadcasting crew. During the fourth quarter of a preseason game early that season, Madden was joking about doing some recording in the "Horse Trailer", a term the producers used for one of the ABC production trucks. It was, in fact, a custom-built trailer designed from the shell of a horse trailer, but housed sophisticated electronic equipment inside it. By the first week of the regular season, an idea to decorate the plain white trailer with MNF decor, the entire MNF schedule, and a weekly MVP, was born. Immediately following each game, the winner(s) is chosen, and his picture is affixed to the trailer in the corresponding location. When Madden and Michaels went to NBC in 2006, they debuted a similar feature, the Rock Star – in which the photo of the player of the game was attached to the top of 30 Rockefeller Plaza in New York City (the "Horse Trailer" concept was reinstated for the 2007 season).

In addition to Fouts and Madden helming the regular season broadcasts, Brent Musburger and Gary Danielson served as commentators for that year's AFC wild card game, with Jack Arute serving as the sideline reporter.

After suffering through several years of dismal Pro Bowl ratings, ABC considered moving the game to Monday night. In February 2003, Madden declined to serve as color commentator for the game in Hawaii, citing his fear of flying; former MNF personality Dan Fouts took his place. The Pro Bowl held the following year was played on a Sunday as typical, but was moved to ABC's sister network ESPN.

=== 2003 ===
At the start of the 2003 regular season, a new NFL presentation fanfare called Sprint Right by Tom Hedden was used to open and close NFL games. An extended version of it was used as the copyright disclaimer.

CBS Sports introduced Posthumus Zone as the new theme music for The NFL Today and for the network's NFL game telecasts. The song was composed by Los Angeles electronica group E.S. Posthumus, so named because it composes songs that have no-longer-existing ancient cities as a motif. In 2006, Posthumus Zone and a remixed version titled Rise to Glory were included as tracks on the group's second CD release, Rise to Glory. The song Rise to Glory was also featured on The NFL Today and on CBS' NFL broadcasts during the 2005 season.

In 2003, ABC and the NFL dropped the Monday Night Football game for the final week of the regular season. The move, which had been in effect for the first eight years of the broadcast (1970–1977), was the result of declining ratings, as well as problems involved for potential playoff teams, as there was a potential of only four days rest between their final regular season game and first-round playoff game. ABC replaced the telecast with an opening weekend Thursday night game, and in exchange ESPN got a Saturday night game on the final weekend.

Also during the 2003 season, Lisa Guerrero decided to leave Fox Sports Net's The Best Damn Sports Show Period to join the MNF television crew as a sideline reporter (replacing the pregnant Melissa Stark). Guerrero's performance on the broadcast was heavily criticized, and the following year (also in an apparent move away from the "eye candy" concept) ABC replaced her with longtime TV sports journalist Michele Tafoya. Guerrero defended herself by saying that the show hired her with the intention of going in a totally different direction with the job of sideline reporter – personality-driven and feature-driven – then discarded all of that and told her to just do the job in the usual fashion. She said that she never would have taken the job if she had known that they would change their minds like that. In 2005, Michele Tafoya sat out much of the season while on maternity leave, with Sam Ryan temporarily taking her place.

During the October 6, 2003 game between the Indianapolis Colts and Tampa Bay Buccaneers, Indianapolis was trailing 35–14 with 3:43 remaining. The Colts had returned a Tampa Bay kickoff 90 yard to the 11-yard line, setting up a quick score. The Colts recovered an onside kick and scored again to narrow the margin to 35–28. They forced a Bucs punt and with less than two minutes remaining, Peyton Manning led an 87-yard drive to score the game-tying touchdown with 35 seconds left in regulation. In overtime, kicker Mike Vanderjagt missed a 40-yard field goal, but Simeon Rice was called for a leaping penalty, a rarely seen unsportsmanlike conduct infraction that penalizes a player for running and jumping to block a kick and landing on other players. Vanderjagt's subsequent kick was batted and hit the upright, but fell in good, winning the game for the Colts. Vanderjagt went on to become the second kicker in NFL history not to miss either a field goal or extra point in a single season after Gary Anderson, who accomplished the feat in the 1998 season as a member of the Minnesota Vikings. Vanderjagt did not miss a kick in the playoffs either, making him the first kicker to accomplish that feat (Anderson missed a field goal in the 1998-99 NFC Championship Game).

On December 22, 2003, Green Bay Packers quarterback Brett Favre put on one of the most defining moments of his career (while also ranking among his greatest game ever). The day before the contest against the Oakland Raiders, his father, Irvin, died suddenly of a heart attack. Favre elected to play, passing for four touchdowns in the first half, and 399 yards for the game in a 41–7 destruction of the Raiders (receiving applause from the highly partisan "Raider Nation"). Afterwards, Brett said,

I knew that my dad would have wanted me to play. I love him so much and I love this game. It's meant a great deal to me, to my dad, to my family, and I didn't expect this kind of performance. But I know he was watching tonight.

=== 2004 ===
Starting in 2004, the NFL began awarding the opening game to the defending Super Bowl champions as the official start of their title defense. The unfurling of the team's Super Bowl championship banner in their stadium has become a centerpiece of the opening ceremonies.

Also in, 2004, Jim Nantz and Greg Gumbel swapped roles on CBS's NFL broadcasts. Nantz took Gumbel's place as the lead play-by-play announcer while Gumbel took Nantz's spot as the host of The NFL Today.

On ESPN Sunday Night Football, Pat Summerall replaced Mike Patrick for the preseason and for several regular season weeks following Patrick's recovery from open-heart surgery.

On November 15, 2004, controversy shrouded Philadelphia Eagles wide receiver Terrell Owens when he appeared with actress Nicollette Sheridan (one of the stars of the new hit ABC comedy-drama Desperate Housewives) in an introductory skit which opened that evening's MNF telecast, in which Owens and the Eagles played the Cowboys at Texas Stadium. The skit was widely condemned as being sexually suggestive (see video) and ABC was forced to apologize for airing it (the Eagles went on to win the game, 49-21, with Owens catching three touchdown passes). However, on March 14, 2005, the Federal Communications Commission ruled that the skit did not violate decency standards, because it contained no outright nudity or foul language. Originally, John Madden was supposed to appear in the commercial.

=== 2005 ===
For the 2005 season, which would become ABC's final season as the MNF broadcaster and used through Super Bowl XL, ABC converted its scoring bug into a horizontal time-score banner placed across the bottom of the screen.

On December 5, 2005, in a game dubbed "The Monday Night Massacre" by NFL Films, the Seattle Seahawks shut out the Philadelphia Eagles 42–0 with three defensive touchdowns (two interceptions, one fumble return) to tie the then-largest margin of victory mark in Monday Night Football history and set the mark for the greatest margin of victory in a Monday night shutout, as well as setting the NFL record for scoring the most points with less than 200 yards of offense. Andre Dyson scored twice for the Seahawks defense, once on a 72-yard interception return and the other on a 25-yard fumble return, earning himself the "Horse Trailer Player of the Game" as well as NFC defensive player of the week. A fourth interception return by Michael Boulware fell just short of tying another Seahawks NFL record of four defensive scores in a single game, set during a 45–0 victory over the Kansas City Chiefs in 1984. The defeat was the Eagles third worst in team history. This was due to the Eagles' major injuries including star quarterback Donovan McNabb and also the situation with Terrell Owens. The Eagles also lost their star running back Brian Westbrook due to an injury in this game.

Despite high ratings, ABC lost millions of dollars on televising the games during the late 1990s and 2000s. The NFL also indicated that it wanted Sunday night to be the new night for its marquee game, because more people tend to watch television on Sundays, and games held on that night would be more conducive to flexible scheduling, a method by which some of the NFL's best games could be moved from the afternoon to the evening on Sunday on short notice. Given these factors, as well as the rise of ABC's ratings on Sunday night, and the network's wish of protecting its Desperate Housewives franchise (which they knew would be costly), on April 18, 2005, ABC and the NFL announced the end of their 36-year partnership, with the Monday Night Football broadcasts being moved to ESPN starting with the 2006 season; the move was criticized by some of the Disney shareholders (as well as NFL fans and purists). However, ESPN's ability to collect subscription fees from cable and satellite providers, in addition to selling commercials, made it more likely that ESPN could turn a profit on NFL telecasts, as opposed to ABC's heavy losses.

The final Monday Night Football broadcast on ABC aired on December 26, 2005, when the New York Jets hosted the New England Patriots from Giants Stadium. Coincidentally, both the first and last ABC Monday Night Football game telecasts ended with a score of 31–21 with the Jets on the losing end. Vinny Testaverde holds the distinction of throwing the last TD pass in ABC's MNF telecast history; it was to wide receiver Laveranues Coles. Also, Testaverde's pass set an NFL record: most consecutive seasons with a touchdown pass, 19 seasons (1987–2005). Patriots linebacker Mike Vrabel set a record of note during that last ABC telecast, becoming the first player to catch two touchdown passes and record a quarterback sack in the same game. The final play of the ABC era was a Pats kneeldown by 44-year-old reserve quarterback Doug Flutie. John Madden said at the show's ending:

They can take football away from ABC on Monday nights, but they can't take away the memories.

During its final NFL television contract, ABC was awarded the telecasts to Super Bowl XXXIV, Super Bowl XXXVII and Super Bowl XL. With the end of ABC's contract, the Super Bowl XL broadcast was the network's final NFL telecast until 2016, when they simulcasted ESPN's Wild Card game production. To replace Monday Night Football, ABC turned its series of primetime college football specials, which had run until 1975 and again from 1990 to 1993 and from 1996 onward, into a regular series. The network also acquired the rights to the CMA Awards ceremony. The Monday after ABC's final Monday Night game saw the premiere of Dancing With the Stars.

To replace Sunday Night Football ESPN moved its late-season Sunday Night Baseball broadcasts back to the network and replaced most of the rest of the open weeks with NBA telecasts.

After the 2005 season, James Brown left Fox to return to CBS Sports, where he would become the host of the CBS network's NFL pregame show The NFL Today. On August 16, 2006, after weeks of speculation, the network officially announced that Joe Buck would take over the role as host vacated by Brown. The move also resulted in the show switching from being broadcast from a permanent Los Angeles studio to a portable studio configuration, similar to the pregame show for NASCAR on Fox, in which analysts Terry Bradshaw, Howie Long and Jimmy Johnson joined Buck at the stadium site to which Buck is assigned as play-by-play announcer for one of that week's telecasts. Curt Menefee worked all halftime shows and all postgame shows on Sundays when no doubleheader was scheduled, also from the same game site with the same analysts. Menefee hosted Fox NFL Sunday during the several weeks in October when Buck was not available; during that time, Buck called Major League Baseball postseason games, including the World Series. The pregame shows on October 15, 22 and 29 were broadcast from the Los Angeles studios; the show returned to the road on November 5.

After NBC lost its NFL rights to CBS at the end of the 1997 season, it in the process, marked the beginning of a slow decline for its sports division, culminating in the unproductive 2004–05 prime time season (despite heavy lineup promotion during the 2004 Summer Olympics), when NBC carried no major sporting championships during prime time (NBC had already lost Major League Baseball broadcasting rights in 2000 and National Basketball Association rights in 2002; the network had acquired National Hockey League rights in 2004, but that league was involved in a lockout that season). The other major sport on NBC was the NASCAR Winston/Nextel Cup Series.

NBC's attempts to replace the NFL with other professional football, including the XFL in 2001 and the Arena Football League coverage from 2003 to 2006, proved to be very unsuccessful. Like CBS before it, NBC would later decide that not having NFL rights did too much damage to its overall ratings to justify foregoing the high rights fees required.

In 2005, NBC re-entered the NFL picture during negotiations for television contracts. The network was able to take advantage of a league desire to be able to switch the schedule so non-competitive games would not air in the league's marquee timeslot. Since this would require a move to Sunday night in order for this to happen, and since ABC decided to relinquish their rights to Monday Night Football, NBC was able to bid on the Sunday Night Football package and won the rights after ESPN (corporate sibling to ABC and which had previously held those rights) elected to take over the Monday Night Football rights instead. NBC resumed airing NFL football on August 6, 2006, with coverage of the annual AFC-NFC Hall of Fame Game.

NBC's rights package nearly identical to the previous ABC package; in addition to the Hall of Fame Game, the contract gave NBC the rights to one additional preseason game, the National Football League Kickoff game, and two Saturday playoff games. NBC also received the rights to two Super Bowls in its bidding, Super Bowl XLIII and Super Bowl XLVI as well as the Pro Bowls in each of those two years. ABC did not have the right to be flexible with their Monday Night Football schedule and picked matchups based on a team's record in the previous season (as NBC does), which often led to teams with losing records playing each other on Monday night later in the season. The moves were intended to break NBC out of its ratings slump; however, this did not happen right away, and although NBC Sunday Night Football is the network's top-rated program and places in the top 30 among all broadcast network programs, it had no effect on the rest of the network's schedule for several years.

=== 2006 ===
On February 6, 2006, CBS Sports announced the return of James Brown, who left CBS eleven years earlier to become studio host of Fox NFL Sunday, to the network as the host of The NFL Today beginning with the 2006 NFL season. Greg Gumbel moved back to play-by-play duties, teaming with Dan Dierdorf as part of its secondary announcing team, replacing Dick Enberg.

Lesley Visser returned to The NFL Today after a two-year hiatus in her previous role as feature reporter, a position she continues to hold to this day; meanwhile, Bonnie Bernstein left the network to pursue other broadcasting opportunities. Aside from Visser returning to the show, Sam Ryan joined CBS Sports in June 2006, as a reporter for The NFL Today; Ryan left the network after the 2010 NFL season.

Al Michaels, the longtime voice of Monday Night Football and other events for ABC, moved to NBC to become the play-by-play announcer for Sunday Night Football. Michaels was originally slated to continue calling Monday Night Football for ESPN, but a trade was worked out between NBC and The Walt Disney Company, the parent company of ABC and ESPN. In the trade, Michaels was able to join NBC in exchange for Disney acquiring from NBC's corporate sibling Universal Pictures, among other things, the rights to the cartoon character Oswald the Lucky Rabbit, which was created at Universal by Walt Disney and Ub Iwerks before the founding of Disney's studio (and then given to Walter Lantz, whose most famous creation would be Woody Woodpecker). Tom Hammond was NBC's secondary play-by-play announcer, calling one of NBC's two games on Wild Card Weekend.

John Madden (who had last worked with Al Michaels on Monday Night Football for ABC) was one of the first people hired by NBC, chosen to continue as a color analyst. Cris Collinsworth substituted for Madden when he was unavailable, called Wild Card games alongside Hammond until 2008, and took over on a permanent basis for the 2009 season when Madden announced his retirement from broadcasting on April 16, 2009. Prior to this, he served as a studio analyst for NBC's pregame show, Football Night in America. For the 2009 season, Joe Theismann and Joe Gibbs took Collinsworth's place in the booth for the first game of Wild Card Weekend. Andrea Kremer meanwhile, was the sideline reporter.

The first regular season game to be shown by NBC under this contract, between the Miami Dolphins and the Pittsburgh Steelers, aired on September 7, 2006, followed by the first Sunday-night game – between the Indianapolis Colts and New York Giants – on September 10, 2006. The actual first game of the run – the 2006 Pro Football Hall of Fame Game between the Oakland Raiders and Philadelphia Eagles – was televised on August 6, 2006.

The graphics, logos and scoreboard for NBC's Sunday Night Football telecasts were designed by Troika Design Group, along with the city skyline graphics used in the introductions to both Football Night in America and the games proper. It was effectively the first time the network used permanent time/score boxes throughout any of their sports broadcasts outside of Olympic Games broadcasts, where permanent scoring displays were compulsory; prior to 2006, the network continued the previous mode of presenting the scores on-screen for a short time every few minutes or so, a method common in American sports broadcasting until Fox introduced constant scoring displays in 1994.

NBC's game telecasts use the same type of horizontal bottom-screen scoreboard that Monday Night Football used in the 2005 NFL season (and was subsequently used by ABC Sports until its rebranding in August 2006). After its debut, the graphics also began to be phased in across other NBC Sports properties, including its coverage of Notre Dame football and the annual Bayou Classic game (which uses exactly the same graphics used on SNF broadcasts), National Hockey League coverage (which uses the SNF graphics but with a scoreboard on the top), and tennis and golf (which use a modified version influenced by the look, but with bolder text for readability purposes). NBC's Olympics coverage continues to use a different package mixed between NBC's graphics and those of the IOC's world feed. The NBC football graphics are also used, in some form or another, on certain locally produced preseason telecasts carried by NBC owned-and-operated stations and affiliates that serve as flagship outlets for NFL teams (such as New York Giants preseason games on WNBC, and the Minnesota Vikings on KARE-TV).

In the 2006 season, in addition to the World Series off-week, there was no game scheduled for Christmas Eve night; NBC broadcast that week's game (Eagles at Cowboys) on Christmas afternoon instead. A half-hour version of Football Night in America aired before the Christmas game and the two "Wild Card Saturday" games. During the 2006 season, no game was initially scheduled for NBC in the affected weeks – instead, the schedule slot for the NBC game was left vacant, with one Sunday afternoon game being moved to the primetime slot (the schedule for the affected weeks simply read "one of these games will move to 8:15 Eastern"). CBS and Fox could each protect four of its games during Weeks 10 through 15 and also each protect one of its games for Week 17; however, these two networks had to decide which games to protect in early October 2006, after Week 4 of the NFL season.

As late as 2006, CBS aired only three of its NFL games in high-definition each week, the same number of games it had aired for the past few seasons. The other networks that held rights to broadcast NFL games – NBC, NFL Network and ESPN – broadcast all of their games in high definition, and Fox broadcast up to six in HD. Because of this, some fans accused CBS of being "cheap." Beginning with the 2007 season, CBS began airing five of the Sunday games in high definition television on doubleheader weeks, and six on singleheader weeks.

Former CBS Sports Executive Vice President Tony Petitti (who left CBS in April 2008 to become the head of the newly-established MLB Network) claimed the network would probably air all of its NFL games in high definition by 2009. When asked about the move, Petitti commented that CBS was focused on building a new studio for The NFL Today pre-game show. However, another CBS executive had previously indicated that, because CBS was an "early adopter" with its first HD game in 1998, it is already "at capacity" and would have to replace newly purchased equipment in its network center with even more expensive equipment. However, CBS did carry its entire slate of games in 2009 in HD, though a few non-essential camera positions for some games (mainly used only in analysis situations) continued to be shot in 4:3 SD.

ESPN's first Monday night broadcast was a preseason game held on August 14, 2006, when the Oakland Raiders visited the Minnesota Vikings, publicized as the return of Randy Moss to Minnesota for the first time since the Vikings traded him after the 2004 season. The telecast debuted with brand-new graphics, including a time-score box placed in the lower center of the screen; a variation of the MNF graphics began to be used on almost all sporting events televised by ESPN and ABC (the former of which effectively took over full responsibility of ABC's sports division that year, which was rebranded as ESPN on ABC). The first regular season Monday Night Football game to air on ESPN was on September 11, 2006, featuring the visiting Minnesota Vikings at the Washington Redskins at FedExField, in which the Vikings won 19–16.

The September 25 edition of Monday Night Football highlighted the New Orleans Saints' first game back in the Louisiana Superdome following Hurricane Katrina to take on the Atlanta Falcons. The game had a Super Bowl-like atmosphere with performances by the Goo Goo Dolls, U2 and Green Day before the game. The NFL tapped producer Don Mischer and director Hamish Hamilton to produce the event. Former President George H. W. Bush handled the pregame coin toss. The Saints beat the Falcons 23–3 in what now ranks as one of the most-watched events in the history of cable television.

ESPN's October 23, 2006 game telecast between the New York Giants and Dallas Cowboys drew the largest audience in the history of cable television at the time, besting the previous mark set by a 1993 North American Free Trade Agreement (NAFTA) debate between Al Gore and Ross Perot. An average of 16,028,000 viewers (12.8 rating) watched as the Giants defeated the Cowboys, 36–22. ESPN's Monday Night Football telecasts now account for eight of the ten highest-rated programs in cable television history.

What would eventually be named the "NFL's comeback of the year" was played on Monday Night Football on October 16. Late in the third quarter, the massive underdog Arizona Cardinals led the Chicago Bears 23–3. Arizona seemed to have the game wrapped up, as rookie quarterback Matt Leinart was having a great day, and Arizona had forced six turnovers out of Chicago quarterback Rex Grossman. Chicago's defense then went on to score 14 points on fumble returns for touchdowns. With 2:58 left in the fourth quarter, and down 17–23, Chicago's Devin Hester returned a punt for a touchdown to take a 24–23 lead. Leinart then led the Cardinals down the field, only to have Neil Rackers miss a field goal, and Chicago went on to win.

On November 17, 2006, a source told the Los Angeles Times that the final two pregame shows of the 2006 season would take place in the Los Angeles studios, with Joe Buck hosting and Dick Stockton taking Buck's place on play-by-play duties at the games alongside Troy Aikman. The source cited that declining ratings no longer justified its high production costs, including security expenses. A Fox spokesman would only say that changes were being considered.

At the conclusion of the 2006 season, ESPN had managed to secure all of the cable television audience records. Monday Night Football and its surrounding shoulder programming also became the most profitable franchise on cable television.

CBS' coverage of the AFC Championship Game earned a 28.1 rating, which topped the season premiere of American Idol on Fox. Its Super Bowl XLI broadcast drew the third largest television audience in history, finishing behind only its broadcast of the M*A*S*H finale ("Goodbye, Farewell and Amen") in 1983 and NBC's broadcast of Super Bowl XXX (Dallas and Pittsburgh) from 1996. Super Bowl XLI was the second most watched Super Bowl broadcast of all-time, averaging 93.1 million viewers.

=== 2007 ===
During Wild Card weekend, Curt Menefee substituted for Joe Buck as host of the Hollywood-originated pregame show broadcast on Fox. Meanwhile, Buck called the January 7, 2007 game between the New York Giants at the Philadelphia Eagles. During the Divisional Playoffs, Menefee once again substituted for Joe Buck as host, as the pregame show again originated from Hollywood for both games. Stockton called the Saturday, January 13 game between the Philadelphia Eagles at the New Orleans Saints and Buck called the Sunday, January 14 game between the Seattle Seahawks at the Chicago Bears.

For the NFC Championship Game between the New Orleans Saints and Chicago Bears on January 21, 2007, Joe Buck hosted the pregame show with the Fox NFL Sunday crew on location from Soldier Field. After Buck joined Aikman for play-by-play duties, Menefee took over as host for the remainder of the game and hosted the halftime and postgame shows. Terry Bradshaw handled the trophy ceremony during the postgame show.

After the 2006 NFL season, Fox NFL Sunday returned to the Los Angeles studio throughout the entire 2007 regular season and for the two weeks of that year's postseason. Curt Menefee became the full-time host of the pregame show, while Joe Buck reverted to strictly handling play-by-play duties.

For the first time since NBC gained the rights to Sunday Night Football, a tentative full-season schedule was unveiled, including games in the last seven weeks of the season. Those games could be replaced under flexible scheduling if the need arose. The same rules under which CBS and Fox protect games for their own packages still apply.

In March 2007, it was announced that Fox NFL Sunday (then branded on-air as The Built Ford Tough Fox NFL Sunday, via a sponsorship agreement with Ford Motor Company) would resume studio broadcasts for the 2007 season, with Curt Menefee assuming full-time hosting duties and Joe Buck reverting to play-by-play only. Jillian Reynolds, who was coming off maternity leave, returned full-time as the program's weather anchor. However, the pre-game show was on-site at Lambeau Field for the 2007 NFC Championship Game between the New York Giants and the Green Bay Packers and at Super Bowl XLII.

Three of the games in the last seven weeks of the season were eventually replaced with more compelling matches. This resulted in the situation – twice – of having a team playing on consecutive Sunday nights. New England had consecutive Sunday nighters: the November 18 New England at Buffalo game was moved to prime time and was followed on November 25 by the already-scheduled Philadelphia at New England game. Likewise, the Washington Redskins played a scheduled game at the New York Giants on December 16, and their December 23 game in Minnesota was moved to prime time. For the last week of the season, the Tennessee Titans–Indianapolis Colts game was moved, switching places with the Kansas City Chiefs–New York Jets game that was originally scheduled in the Sunday night slot; the Titans needed a win to secure the final AFC playoff spot.

In addition, the annual preseason Hall of Fame Game telecast was shifted to NFL Network, in anticipation of NBC airing the China Bowl contest from Beijing; however, the China Bowl was canceled.

In 2007, CBS added a fifth member to its studio analyst table by adding then-recently retired head coach Bill Cowher. Meanwhile, Fox NFL Sunday introduced a new feature, a pre-recorded segment titled "Grumpy Old Coaches", in which Jimmy Johnson and fellow former Dallas Cowboys head coach Barry Switzer discuss the past week in football. A segment of highlights and commentary of the previous day's college football games was also featured, as a gesture to Fox's then recent acquisition of broadcast rights to the Bowl Championship Series (BCS). This segment was dropped following the 2007 season.

For the 2007 season, CBS announced the advent of "CBS Eye-lert," a service that allows viewers to be notified via e-mail and text message when the start time of a program will be delayed. The "Eye-lert" was eventually extended on-air to a banner graphic that appears during the prime time lineup within sports broadcasts and segments of delayed regularly scheduled evening programs.

Analyst and former NFL quarterback Ron Jaworski replaced Joe Theismann, who was offered a prominent football analyst job with ESPN, in the booth beginning with the 2007 season.

Upon the original launch of the Thursday and Saturday night games, few television service providers carried the NFL Network due to disputes during the network's terms in its carriage contracts during negotiations. These disputes were magnified throughout the 2007 season, as two high-profile matchups were to be broadcast by the network. The first was a matchup between the Dallas Cowboys and Green Bay Packers which was scheduled for the week after Thanksgiving and saw both teams at 10-1, vying for the top seed in the NFC, and the second was Week 17 Saturday night game between the New England Patriots and the New York Giants, where the Patriots had a chance to become the first team since the 1972 Miami Dolphins to end a regular season undefeated.

In the first case, fans were displeased that a matchup between two teams at such a critical point in the season was not available on broadcast television except in the Dallas and Green Bay markets. To avoid such a problem with the potential sixteenth victory for the Patriots, CBS and NBC bought broadcast rights to the game so it could be seen by a nationwide audience on both cable and broadcast television. This ended up causing another controversy, however, as the move by the networks infringed on the exclusivity that would normally have been enjoyed by WWOR-TV in New York City and WCVB-TV in Boston, which were the Giants' and Patriots' respective local over-the-air broadcasters for cable-televised games (the game aired on these stations, as well as on WCBS-TV, WNBC, WBZ-TV and WHDH in the teams' market areas).

On December 3, 2007, 17.5 million people watched the undefeated New England Patriots defeat the Baltimore Ravens, 27–24. The game became the most-watched single cable television program of all-time by total viewership, breaking the previous record set by the August 17 premiere of High School Musical 2, which was viewed by 17.2 million on ESPN corporate sibling Disney Channel (after the film was surpassed by the Patriots-Ravens game, High School Musical 2 retained the record as the highest-rated non-sports program in basic cable history).

=== 2008 ===
The 2008 schedule, released on April 15, continued the 2007 practice of a scheduled game possibly being moved in favor of a more compelling one during Weeks 11 through 16 (November 16 through December 21), but left the slot open on the final Sunday, December 28. The NFL Kickoff Game between the Washington Redskins and defending Super Bowl champion New York Giants that was played on September 4 started at 7:00 p.m. Eastern Time instead of the normal 8:30 p.m. time in order to avoid conflict with the nomination speech that John McCain gave at the Republican National Convention that night; the game ended at 10:01 p.m. Eastern Time, averting any conflict.

Starting in 2008, NFL Network eliminated all but one of the Saturday night games and started their Thursday night package three weeks earlier. This was done to accommodate the earlier schedule and the league's antitrust exemption that prohibits Saturday games from being held for most of the season.

On June 24, 2008, it was announced that former New York Giants defensive end Michael Strahan would join Fox NFL Sunday as an analyst. On November 8, 2009, a special two-hour edition of the program was broadcast on-location from Afghanistan, featuring an audience of U.S. soldiers. While the regular Fox NFL Sunday crew did the pregame show, Chris Rose served as the studio host and anchored the in-game highlights, as John Lynch and Trent Green served as studio analysts for the halftime and post-game reports during the broadcast. On January 24, 2010, Fox NFL Sunday broadcast on-location from New Orleans for the 2009 NFC Championship.

After experiencing low ratings and criticism about the production during the 2007 season, ESPN announced that long-time sideline reporters Suzy Kolber and Michele Tafoya would have reduced roles for the 2008 season.

As the 2008 season began, ESPN announced a new focus on covering the games as sporting events rather than as entertainment and cultural events. Among the changes were the removal of celebrity booth guests and a reduction in the number of sideline interviews. Tafoya and Kolber were retained to conduct those interviews and file reports from the field. In addition, ESPN replaced the bottom center-screen time-score box introduced in 2006 (which was used until the 2008 preseason) with a horizontal time-score banner across the bottom of the screen.

The September 15, 2008 Eagles–Cowboys game, with a 13.3 rating and 18.6 million viewers, set a new record for the most-watched cable television program, surpassing the record set the previous October by the Patriots-Ravens game.

The night before the 2008 United States Presidential Election, Monday Night Football studio host Chris Berman interviewed both major party candidates, Republican nominee John McCain and Democratic nominee Barack Obama at halftime. The November 10, 2008 game featured the Washington Redskins losing to the Pittsburgh Steelers, 23-6.

As had happened in 2007, a team played on consecutive Sunday nights due to a game being moved into the Sunday night time slot. The originally scheduled New York Giants-Dallas Cowboys game on December 14 was followed by a flexed December 21 home game for the Giants against the Carolina Panthers; the Giants-Panthers game was flexed because it carried serious playoff implications, as the winner would clinch the NFC's top seed and home-field advantage throughout the playoffs. This was the second of three flexed games, with a December 7 interconference matchup between the Baltimore Ravens and Washington Redskins. The league filled the open spot on December 28 with a game between the Denver Broncos and San Diego Chargers with major playoff implications, as the winner of that game would win the AFC West and earn a home game in the playoffs while the loser would be eliminated.

=== 2009 ===
Super Bowl XLIII was NBC's first Super Bowl broadcast since Super Bowl XXXII, The five-hour pre-game show was preceded by a two-hour special edition of Today hosted by the regular weekday team live from Tampa and the NFL Films – produced Road to the Super Bowl. Matt Millen was part of the coverage as a studio analyst. The Today contribution included portions of a taped interview with President Barack Obama and pictures of troops viewing the proceedings in Iraq. His calling of the game made John Madden (in his final game broadcast) the first person to have announced a Super Bowl for each of the four major U.S. television networks, having called five Super Bowls for CBS, three for Fox, and two for ABC prior to joining NBC in 2006; Al Michaels also became the second person (after Pat Summerall on CBS and Fox) to be the lead Super Bowl play-by-play announcer for two different major U.S. networks (ABC and NBC). The Super Bowl was one of two major professional sports championship series NBC broadcast in 2009, as it would also broadcast the Stanley Cup Finals. Both championship series involved teams from Pittsburgh winning championships (the Penguins would win the Stanley Cup that year).

The NFL has a strict policy prohibiting networks to run ads during the Super Bowl from the gambling industry, and has rejected ads from the Las Vegas Convention and Visitors Authority. It had been reported that if the television program Las Vegas was airing when NBC televised Super Bowl XLIII in 2009, they likely would not have been allowed to promote the series during the entire broadcast. As Vegas ended during the 2007–2008 television season, this was no longer an issue for NBC.

With an average U.S. audience of 98.7 million viewers, Super Bowl XLIII was the most-watched Super Bowl in history, and at that point the second-most-watched U.S. television program of any kind (trailing only the final episode of M*A*S*H in 1983; both would be broken by Super Bowl XLIV the following year). However, the Nielsen rating of 42.1, was lower than the 43.3 rating for Super Bowl XLII the previous year.

The 2009 schedule, released on April 14, continued the 2007 and 2008 practice of scheduling a game every Sunday night during the season (except during the World Series) but declaring the games in Weeks 11 through 16 (November 22 through December 27) subject to change, should a more compelling matchup arise. The pattern of the 2007 and 2008 schedules was continued, as the slot for the final Sunday night of the season – January 3, 2010 – was left vacant. Two games were "flexed" in the 2009 season, as the Minnesota Vikings–Arizona Cardinals game replaced the original December 6 matchup between the New England Patriots and Miami Dolphins.

To fill the vacant game slot for the last week of the season, NBC was given the matchup between the Cincinnati Bengals and New York Jets that was originally scheduled for 4:15 p.m. Eastern on CBS, with this game having playoff implications for both teams. For the Jets, a win would have put them in the playoffs, while the Bengals had the potential to improve their seeding for the playoffs with a victory. The Jets-Bengals game ended up being the last game played at Giants Stadium (the Jets could have hosted the AFC Championship game, but the Baltimore Ravens did not hold up their end of the deal).

Tony Kornheiser stepped down from Monday Night Football for the 2009 season and was replaced by former Oakland Raiders and Tampa Bay Buccaneers head coach Jon Gruden. The rest of the team remained intact.

In the following season, all references to Saturday Night Football were dropped, and any games that are not played on Thursday (such as in 2016, two Christmas weekend games and an NFL International Series game) have since been branded as "special editions" of Thursday Night Football, and later Thursday Night Special or NFL Network Special. The Thanksgiving matchup was moved from NFL Network to NBC's Sunday Night Football package as part of the new broadcast contract after the 2011 season. During Super Bowl week in 2012, it was announced that the Thursday Night Football package would expand from eight to 13 games and air on NFL Network, again soliciting and rejecting offers from Turner Sports and Comcast.

The October 5, 2009 Packers–Vikings game was the fourth ESPN MNF broadcast to become the most-watched program ever on a cable channel, with a 15.3 rating and 21.839 million viewers. The record stood until it was surpassed by the network's telecast of the BCS National Championship Game on January 10, 2011.

== See also ==
- NFL on television
- History of the NFL on television
- List of NFL Championship Game broadcasters
- List of Super Bowl broadcasters
- History of Monday Night Football
