= Cartographer (disambiguation) =

A cartographer is a person who deals with the art, science and technology of making and using maps.

Cartographer may also refer to:

- geography (album), album by E.S. Posthumus
- The Cartographer, extended play by The Republic of Wolves
- Cartographers (board game), a board game designed by Jordy Adan
- "Cartographers", a song by the Linda Lindas from No Obligation

== See also ==
- Cartography (album), by Arve Henriksen
- Mapmaker (disambiguation)
