= The Cartographer =

EP by The Republic of Wolves
- Released: January 1, 2011
- Recorded: 2010
- Genre: Indie rock, alternative, post-hardcore, folk rock
- Length: 30:21
- Label: Self-released, Simple Stereo (vinyl)
- Producer: The Republic Of Wolves

The Republic of Wolves chronology
Varuna (2010)	The Cartographer (2011)	No Matter How Narrow (2013)

Professional ratings
Review scores
Source	Rating
AbsolutePunk	9/10 stars
Punknews	4/5 stars
Sputnikmusic	4.5/5 stars
PropertyOfZack	4/5 stars
MindEqualsBlown	8.5/10 stars
Alter The Press	4/5 stars

The Cartographer is the second extended play by the Long Island indie rock band The Republic of Wolves. It was self-released digitally by the band on January 1, 2011. The EP was recorded, mixed, and mastered by guitarist/vocalist Gregg Andrew DellaRocca at his home studio and produced by the band members themselves. The EP is notable as it is the first release from the band where DellaRocca handles a majority of the lead vocals. The album was released on vinyl by Simple Stereo on May 6, 2011.

== Track listing ==
All songs written by Gregg Andrew DellaRocca, Billy Duprey, Mason Maggio, Christian Van Deurs, and Chris Wall.

No.	Title	Length
1.	"The Pilot and the Pilot's Boy"	1:35
2.	"Home"	3:02
3.	"Calm Down"	4:00
4.	"Widow's Walk"	4:28
5.	"India"	3:53
6.	"Mirage"	4:03
7.	"The Dead Men Stood Together" (The song "The Dead Men Stood Together" ends at 6:15. Instead of silence, the song is followed by a long background note until 7:35 when an untitled hidden song begins.)	9:20

Vinyl bonus tracks
No.	Title	Length
8.	"Albatross"	4:30
9.	"The Dead Men Stood Together (Alternate Version)"	5:07
