= Ebla (disambiguation) =

Ebla was one of the earliest kingdoms in Syria.

Ebla may also refer to:

- Ebla, a Syrian oil and gas processing company, see Shaer gas field
- HD 218566, star with proper name Ebla
- eBLA, electronic Biologics license application
- "Ebla", track on Unearthed (E.S. Posthumus album)
- EBLA, location code for the Bochum-Langendreer station
