= His Old Branches =

EP by The Republic of Wolves
- Released: December 15, 2009
- Recorded: 2009
- Genre: Indie rock, alternative, post-hardcore
- Length: 30:00
- Label: Vintage Hustle Records, Simple Stereo
- Producer: The Republic of Wolves

The Republic of Wolves chronology
His Old Branches (2009)	Varuna (2010)

Professional ratings
Review scores
Source	Rating
AbsolutePunk	87%
Punknews.org	4/5 stars
Sputnikmusic	4.5/5 stars

His Old Branches is the debut extended play by the Long Island indie rock band The Republic of Wolves. It was originally released on iTunes on December 15, 2009. It has since been released on CD by Vintage Hustle Records on June 18, 2010. The EP was recorded, mixed, and mastered by guitarist/vocalist Gregg Andrew DellaRocca at his home studio.

== Track listing ==
All songs written by Gregg Andrew DellaRocca, Billy Duprey, Mason Maggio, Christian Van Deurs, and Chris Wall.

No.	Title	Length
1.	"Done Haunting Houses"	1:52
2.	"Spill"	4:27
3.	"Cardinals"	3:21
4.	"For His Old Branches"	4:37
5.	"The Clouds"	3:54
6.	"A Weather Vane"	4:47
7.	"Through Windows" (The song "Through Windows" ends at minute 5:20. After 45 seconds of silence, at minute 6:05, there is an instrumental hidden track that resembles a The Republic of Wolves b-side titled "Wood and Bricks.")	7:02

Vinyl bonus track
No.	Title	Length
8.	"Wood and Bricks"	5:07
