= Empty Vessels =

EP by The Republic of Wolves
- Released: December 17, 2013
- Recorded: 2013
- Genre: Indie rock, folk rock, acoustic
- Length: 35:46
- Label: Self-released, Simple Stereo (digital)
- Producer: The Republic of Wolves

The Republic of Wolves chronology
No Matter How Narrow (2013)	Empty Vessels (2013)	Shrine (2018)

Empty Vessels is an extended play (EP) by the Long Island indie rock band The Republic of Wolves. It was originally released on the band's web store on December 17, 2013. The EP was recorded, mixed and mastered by the guitarist/vocalist Mason Maggio at The Republic of Wolves' home studio. It contains b-sides along with acoustic and alternate versions of songs from the band's second full-length album, No Matter How Narrow.

== Track listing ==
All songs written by Mason Maggio, Christian Van Deurs, Gregg Andrew Dellarocca, and Billy Duprey.

No.	Title	Length
1.	"Consequence"	4:29
2.	"Javelin"	3:54
3.	"Panicked Leaps"	3:32
4.	"Spare Key (Acoustic)"	3:42
5.	"Consequence (Acoustic)"	4:10
6.	"Turning Lane (Acoustic)"	2:58
7.	"Stray(s) (Alternate Version)"	5:06
8.	"Keep Clean (Acoustic)"	4:24
9.	"Frozen Feet (Acoustic)"	3:30
Total length:		35:46
