= Cartographer (album) =

Studio album by E.S. Posthumus
- Released: 14 January 2008
- Genre: Modern classical, new age, symphonic rock
- Length: 2:14:05
- Label: Wigshop Records
- Producer: E.S. Posthumus

E.S. Posthumus chronology
Unearthed (2001)	Cartographer (2008)	Makara (2010)

Professional ratings
Review scores
Source	Rating
TrackSounds	8/10 stars

Cartographer, the second album from E.S. Posthumus, was supposed to release sometime in 2006 but was later released in early 2007. The delay from the original release date can only so far be attributed to the Vonlichten brothers' ill-concern with deadlines, although it is rumored the delay in release was due to the addition of Luna Sans to the group of musicians, an addition much heralded by Helmut Vonlichten

Upon the album's release on the CDBaby website, it came accompanied with the following album description:

"In 1929, the ancient map "Piri Reis" was discovered in Istanbul. The map is extraordinary because it depicts bays and islands on the Antarctic coast which have been concealed under ice for at least 6,000 years. What civilization was capable of such exploration that long ago?

On "Cartographer", we imagine that these explorers were from the tiny island of Numa in the Southern Indian Ocean. As advanced seafarers, they navigated every corner of the Earth. We have created a language unique to them and tell stories through song that describe their creation, discoveries and ultimate demise.

This is a 2 CD collection with Vocal and Remix versions of every song. The Remix CD also contains 2 bonus tracks."

The vocal tracks are sung by Luna Sans, while the remix versions replace her vocals with instrumental solos and choir melodies, much in the style of Posthumus's first album, "Unearthed".

As of 17 January 2008, a new section was added to the official website of E.S. Posthumus with the focus being on the new album.

== Track listing ==
Disc 1 - Luna Sans (Vocal)

1. "Nolitus" - 4:30
2. "Isunova" - 5:29
3. "Vorrina" - 6:12
4. "Selisona" - 5:05
5. "Marunae" - 4:53
6. "Mosane" - 4:14
7. "Decifin" - 4:37
8. "Sollente" - 5:11
9. "Caarano" - 3:35
10. "Raptamei" - 5:20
11. "Oraanu" - 3:57
12. "Nivaos" - 5:12
13. "Nasivern" - 5:35

Disc 2 - Piri Reis Remixes (Remix)

1. "Ashielf Pi" - 1:32
2. "Oraanu Pi" - 3:38
3. "Marunae Pi" - 4:52
4. "Mosane Pi" - 4:16
5. "Isunova Pi" - 5:41
6. "Nasivern Pi" - 5:29
7. "Selisona Pi" - 4:31
8. "Raptamei Pi" - 5:54
9. "Caarano Pi" - 3:35
10. "Nivaos Pi" - 5:13
11. "Sollente Pi" - 5:12
12. "Decifin Pi" - 4:36
13. "Vorrina Pi" - 6:14
14. "Nolitus Pi" - 4:26
15. "Odenall Pi" - 5:06

== Media usage ==
The list below provides details on movie trailers or television programs that have used tracks from the Cartographer album:

2008

- Lost - "Ashielf Pi"
- The Masters - "Oraanu Pi"
- Brothers & Sisters (TV Promo) - "Marunae Pi"
- Heroes (American TV series) (TV Promo) - "Mosane Pi"
- Law & Order: Special Victims Unit (TV Promo) - "Ashielf Pi"

2009

- Epiphany - "Odenall Pi"
- Top Gear - "Mosane Pi"
