= Unearthed (E.S. Posthumus album) =

Studio album by E.S. Posthumus
- Released: Limited: 29 November 2001; Wide: 3 May 2005
- Genres: New age, neoclassical new-age, psybient, symphonic rock
- Length: 58:13
- Label: Wigshop Records
- Producer: E.S. Posthumus

E.S. Posthumus chronology
Unearthed (2001)	Cartographer (2008)

Professional ratings
Review scores
Source	Rating
AllMusic	3.5/5 stars
Soundtrack.net	3.5/5 stars
TrackSounds	8/10 stars

Unearthed, the first album composed by E.S. Posthumus, was originally made available for purchase online through the CD Baby website in November 2001. It became the third-biggest selling album in CDBaby's history. The success of the album prompted the wide re-release to retail in May 2005 through Wigshop and 33rd Street Records/Bayside Distribution.

A key piece to the distinctive sound of the music comes from working with the Northwest Sinfonia. In an interview with SoundtrackNet, the band said "we wanted the chance to blow an ungodly sum of cash working with a big orchestra". Other musicians performing on this CD include Pedro Eustache, Michael Landau, Matt Laug, Lance Morrison, Davy Spillane and Efrain Toro.

The painting used in the cover of the album is The Inspiration of Saint Matthew by Italian Baroque painter Caravaggio.

== Track listing ==
In keeping with the theme of "all things past", each of the thirteen tracks on the album is named after an ancient city, most of which have been abandoned or destroyed, though Cuzco, Nara, Isfahan, and Estremoz still survive to this day.

All tracks are written by Helmut and Franz Vonlichten

Unearthed
No.	Title	Length
1.	"Antissa"	5:12
2.	"Tikal"	3:47
3.	"Harappa"	4:36
4.	"Ulaid"	5:10
5.	"Ebla"	6:09
6.	"Nara"	4:51
7.	"Cuzco"	4:02
8.	"Nineveh"	3:42
9.	"Lepcis Magna"	3:28
10.	"Menouthis"	3:56
11.	"Estremoz"	5:06
12.	"Pompeii"	3:40
13.	"Isfahan"	4:35
Total length:		58:13

== Personnel ==
=== E.S. Posthumus ===
- Helmut Vonlichten – composing, recording, mixing, arranging
- Franz Vonlichten – composing, recording, mixing, arranging

=== Additional musicians ===
- Pedro Eustache – reeds, woodwind
- Michael Landau - guitar
- Matt Laug – drum machine
- Lance Morrison – bass guitar
- Seattle Choral Company – vocals
- Davy Spillane – low whistle, uilleann pipes
- Efrain Toro - percussion

=== Technical personnel ===
- Brian Gardner – mastering
- David Sabee – contractor
- Woody Woodruff – engineering
- Erich Estereicher – art direction
- Kevin Weel – art direction

== Media usage ==
Many tracks from Unearthed have been featured in various movie trailers and television shows. They have been used in the trailers for movies due to their escalating structure, which makes them well-suited for the dramatic montages building towards the credits in the aforementioned trailers.

An excerpt from the track "Nara" is used as the main theme for the CBS television show Cold Case. A vocal rise performed by a female solo singer (Elise Morris) leads into the opening title, where one of the verses of "Nara" is then played for the remainder of the sequence, concluding with a short melody from a woodwind instrument. At the time Executive Producer Jerry Bruckheimer chose the song to be used in the show, he had never actually met the Vonlichten brothers in person. Additionally, Michael A. Levine, a musical composer for television shows and advertisements, created a reworked version of "Nara" that is played during the show's closing credits as provided by the studio (though not as shown on CBS). The track was also featured in the animation for the presentation of the design for the Beijing WaterCube by the firm architectural LAVA.

The track "Ebla" was also used as the main menu music for the 2008 racing video game Ferrari Challenge: Trofeo Pirelli.

One track from the Unearthed album has also been used in the BBC TV series Top Gear and its stage show, Top Gear Live.

The following list provides details on the movie trailers that have used tracks from the Unearthed album:

2001

- Planet of the Apes - "Menouthis" and "Pompeii"
- Spy Game - "Pompeii"
- The Affair of the Necklace - "Harappa"

2002

- Antwone Fisher - "Nara"
- Minority Report - "Tikal"
- Spider-Man - "Pompeii" and "Nineveh"
- The Recruit - "Menouthis"
- The Time Machine - "Tikal"
- Tuck Everlasting - "Cuzco"
- The Lord of the Rings: The Two Towers - "Nara"
- Unfaithful - "Nara"
- XXX - "Harappa" and "Tikal"

2003

- Tomb Raider: The Angel of Darkness - "Nara"
- Cold Case - "Nara"
- Daredevil - "Lepcis Magna" and "Tikal"
- Lara Croft: Tomb Raider – The Cradle of Life - "Menouthis"
- Pirates of the Caribbean: The Curse of the Black Pearl - "Tikal"
- The Matrix Reloaded - "Ebla"

2004

- Catwoman - "Pompeii"
- National Treasure - "Menouthis" and "Nara"
- Team America: World Police - "Harappa" and "Tikal"
- The Clearing - "Nara"
- Vanity Fair - "Nara"

2005

- Two for the Money - "Nineveh"
- XXX: State of the Union - "Harappa"

2006

- Curse of the Golden Flower - "Pompeii"
- Breaking and Entering - "Nara"
- The Last King of Scotland - "Tikal"

2007

- Partition - "Nara"
- Pirates of the Caribbean: At World's End - "Nineveh"
- The Irony of Fate 2 - "Nara"
- Top Gear: Polar Special
- The Tudors - "Nara" (Opening theme, season 1)

2008

- The Other Boleyn Girl - "Nara"

2010

- The Drawn Together Movie: The Movie! - "Tikal"

2012

- The Hunger Games - "Nara"

2013

- Prosecuting Casey Anthony - "Nara"
