= Mapmaker =

A mapmaker (also called a cartographer) is a person who studies and practices the art of making maps. Mapmaker may also refer to:

- Mapmaker (album), the album by Parts & Labor
- Mapmaker (2001 film), starring Brían F. O'Byrne
- The Mapmaker, a 1957 novel by Frank G. Slaughter
- The Mapmaker (film), 2011 English drama film
- "The Mapmakers", a 1955 short story by Frederik Pohl
- Google Map Maker, a discontinued map editing website
- Level editors, a game development tool used to design levels, maps, or worlds in video games

== See also ==
- Cartographer (disambiguation)
