= The NFL Today =

American television series

- Also known as: Pro Football Kickoff (1961–1962); NFL Kickoff (1962–1964); The NFL Report (1964); The NFL Today (1964–1974; 1975–1994; 1998–present); The NFL on CBS (September–December 1974)
- Genre: Pre-game, halftime and post-game show
- Directed by: Bob Matina
- Presented by: James Brown; Bill Cowher; Nate Burleson; Russell Wilson; Kyle Long; Adam Schein
- Opening theme: See NFL on CBS music
- Ending theme: Same as opening
- Country of origin: United States
- Original language: English
- No. of seasons: 63 (through 2026 season)

Production
- Producer: Drew Kaliski
- Production locations: Sean McManus Studio 43, CBS Broadcast Center, New York, New York
- Camera setup: Multi-camera
- Running time: 15 minutes (1961–1967); 24 minutes (1967–1993); 60 minutes (1998–present)
- Production companies: National Football League; CBS Sports

Original release
- Network: CBS
- Release: September 17, 1961 – January 23, 1994
- Release: September 6, 1998 – present

Related
- NFL on CBS

The NFL Today is an American football television program on CBS that serves as the pre-game, halftime and post-game show for the network's National Football League (NFL) game telecasts under the NFL on CBS brand. The program features commentary on the latest news around the NFL from its hosts and studio analysts, as well as predictions for the day's games and interviews with players and coaches. Originally debuting as Pro Football Kickoff on September 15, 1961, the program airs before all NFL games broadcast by CBS (usually on Sundays at 12:00 p.m. Eastern Time Zone), and generally runs for one hour (except for Thanksgiving and during the postseason when it is generally 30 minutes). The program's commentators also provide commentary during game updates, the halftime reports, and the postgame show on the NFL on CBS broadcasts at the conclusion of single early games and, if time permits, late games.

Since 2025, the crew consists of longtime sportscaster James Brown, who has served as the host of The NFL Today since 2006; former Pittsburgh Steelers head coach Bill Cowher; former Seattle Seahawks, Minnesota Vikings, and Detroit Lions wide receiver Nate Burleson; former Seattle Seahawks, Denver Broncos, Pittsburgh Steelers, and New York Giants quarterback Russell Wilson; and former Chicago Bears and Kansas City Chiefs guard Kyle Long serving as analysts.

The NFL Today broadcasts from Sean McManus Studio 43 at the CBS Broadcast Center in New York City; however, the program will occasionally broadcast from the game site of a high-profile regular season game, the AFC Championship Game, and the Super Bowl. The pregame telecast of the Super Bowl has sometimes been branded as The NFL Today at the Super Bowl, formerly The Super Bowl Today.

From 2014 to 2017, CBS partnered with the NFL Network to air selected Thursday Night Football games; the NFL GameDay crew has appeared in segments on The NFL Today for both Thursdays and Sundays (and Saturdays when applicable).

== Broadcast history ==
=== Dawn of the pregame format (1961–1974) ===
The program began on September 15, 1961, when CBS debuted the first remote 15-minute pre-game show, the first of its kind on network sports television. Originally titled Pro Football Kickoff, hosted by Johnny Lujack, the program originated from NFL stadiums around the country with a comprehensive look at the day's games. This show was succeeded in 1962 and 1963 by NFL Kickoff, with Kyle Rote serving as its host.

On September 13, 1964, Frank Gifford began hosting the renamed NFL Report, which was subsequently retitled The NFL Today later that season. This version of The NFL Today was a 15-minute, regional sports program that presented interviews with NFL players and coaches, and news and features about the league. In 1967, The NFL Today expanded to a 30-minute format preceding game coverage.

On September 20, 1970, The NFL Today signed industry-pioneering women: Marjorie Margolies (later elected to Congress from Pennsylvania in 1992) produced and reported features, and actress Carole Howey, who also reported for the program.

In 1971, Jack Whitaker and Pat Summerall took over hosting duties on the program from Gifford, who left CBS to call play-by-play on ABC's Monday Night Football. In 1973, The NFL Today began originating from CBS' New York City studios; the program also began to include reports from stadiums around the country, although it continued to be pre-recorded before each week's game day.

For 1974, CBS abandoned the pre-recorded NFL Today broadcast and its short-form wrap-up show, Pro Football Report, for a live, wraparound style program titled The NFL on CBS. It started a half-hour prior to kickoff of either the singleheader or doubleheader telecast (12:30, 1:30, or 3:30 p.m. Eastern). On September 15, the revamped program debuted with a new three-segment format: the first featured highlights of the day's games and commentary, special features shot during the week were broadcast during the second segment, and the third covered the day's sports news, including scores and highlights at halftime. The program's hosts were Whitaker (who was brought into the studio after quite a few years serving as a play-by-play announcer for the network's NFL broadcasts) and Lee Leonard.

The program broke ground in a number of ways: it was the first live pre-game show, the first to show halftime highlights of other games televised by CBS, and the first to wrap up as a post-game show. CBS also began referring its stadium studios or its pre-game set, previously known as "CBS Control," as the "CBS Sports Center". The program also no longer featured a third member of the on-air crew stationed at CBS Control to provide scores, halftime information and – time permitting – post-game interviews, a position often held by Dick Stockton during his early days at the network.

=== Musburger, George and Cross (1975–1989) ===
The program reinstated its previous NFL Today title on the September 21, 1975 broadcast, with former WBBM-TV and KCBS-TV sportscaster/anchorman Brent Musburger (previously a play-by-play announcer for CBS) serving as host, former NFL player Irv Cross as an analyst, and former Miss America Phyllis George as one of the reporters. That year, the program won 13 Emmy Awards. Sports bookie Jimmy Snyder, nicknamed "The Greek," joined the program in 1976. Jack Whitaker also contributed to the program as an occasional reporter and essayist during this period. It was during this period that The NFL Today began an 18-year run as the highest-rated program in its time slot, lasting until the network lost the broadcast rights to Fox in 1994, the longest consecutive run for a television program in a consistent time slot.

By this time, the program began the complex process of producing three separate live pre-game, halftime and postgame programs for 1:00 p.m., 2:00 p.m. (through 1981) and 4:00 p.m. (Eastern Time) games. Also for the first time, signature musical pieces are produced for NFL coverage. The show's signature theme was "Horizontal Hold," a piece by Jan Stoeckart (recorded under his pseudonym of Jack Trombey). The NFL Today was among the recipients of the Sports Emmy Awards in its inaugural event in 1979.

Phyllis George was replaced by former Miss Ohio USA Jayne Kennedy beginning with the 1978 NFL season, before George returned to the program for the 1980 NFL season. George was replaced on the program by Charlsie Cantey midway into the 1983 NFL season, after going on parental leave, with George ultimately departing the program outright. Jimmy Snyder was dismissed by CBS Sports on January 16, 1988, one day after making comments about racial differences among NFL players on Martin Luther King Jr. Day. Musburger announced Snyder's dismissal on The NFL Today prior to the Minnesota Vikings-Washington Redskins NFC Championship Game the next day. Snyder's slot on The NFL Today would subsequently be filled by Dick Butkus for the next two seasons.

=== Gumbel and Bradshaw (1990–1993) ===
After the 1989 NFL season, Musburger was abruptly fired on April 1, 1990, following a power shift at CBS (he later resurfaced at ABC), while Cross was demoted to the position of game analyst. They were replaced by former ESPN football analyst and WFAN morning host Greg Gumbel (brother of then-Today co-host Bryant Gumbel), legendary former Pittsburgh Steelers quarterback Terry Bradshaw and longtime sportswriter Lesley Visser, bringing a female reporter back to The NFL Today for the first time since Super Bowl XVIII.

On December 18, 1993, the NFL awarded Fox a four-year contract (worth $1.58 billion) for the broadcast television rights to the National Football Conference (NFC), allowing that network to carry regular season and playoff games from the conference starting with the 1994 NFL season (which it continues to this day). The deal stripped CBS of NFL telecasts following the 1993 NFL season after 38 years; as a result, The NFL Today ended its original run and CBS aired its final NFC telecast on January 23, 1994.

After CBS lost the NFL rights, Greg Gumbel went to NBC Sports, Terry Bradshaw left to become an analyst for Fox's new pre-game show Fox NFL Sunday and Lesley Visser joined ABC as a sideline reporter for Monday Night Football; Gumbel and Visser eventually returned to CBS.

=== CBS reacquires rights (1998–present) ===
The NFL Today made its return to CBS in 1998, after the network signed a contract with the NFL to acquire the broadcast rights to televise games from the American Football Conference (AFC) effective with that year's NFL season, taking over the rights from NBC.

==== Under Jim Nantz (1998–2003) ====
In the months before CBS began its AFC broadcast contract, former NFL Today host Greg Gumbel rejoined CBS from NBC to serve as the lead play-by-play announcer for the NFL game; while Jim Nantz was named as the studio host for The NFL Today (incidentally, during the 1993 season, Nantz filled in for predecessor Gumbel on the program, as the latter was helming the broadcast team for CBS' coverage of the American League Championship Series alongside Jim Kaat). Newcomer Bonnie Bernstein joined CBS as a reporter for The NFL Today, before being moved to a sideline reporting role for the 1999 NFL season. Bernstein eventually returned to the show in 2004, before leaving again in 2005.

The NFL Today returned on September 6, 1998, 1,687 days since the program's last broadcast under the previous NFL contract, with Nantz welcoming back viewers to CBS for its coverage of the NFL. In addition to Nantz as host, the relaunched program's original lineup of studio analysts consisted of Marcus Allen, Brent Jones and George Seifert. Seifert was let go during the season, while Allen and Jones were not retained. Craig James (a former studio analyst for CBS' SEC on CBS pre-game show), Randy Cross (a former color commentator for CBS and NBC) and Jerry Glanville (a former analyst for Fox NFL Sunday) were brought in to replace Allen, Jones, and Seifert alongside Nantz on the pre-game show the next season. As a prelude, James and Cross joined Nantz, Jones, and Allen for the pregame show before the AFC Championship Game during the previous season.

During this time, the program introduced new segments such as Chalk Talk (in which commentators and program guests discuss team strategies), and Outside the Huddle (featuring commentary mocking about people around the NFL provided by PUNT TV pregame host "Thurston Long," a computer-animated character.) Outside the Huddle was later dropped after Viacom decided to split into two companies – CBS Corporation (a restructuring of the original Viacom, which retained CBS, among other assets that included Showtime Networks and UPN) and a new company with the Viacom name (which acquired assets including Paramount Pictures and MTV Networks).

Lesley Visser returned to CBS Sports/The NFL Today for the 2000 NFL season after a six-year hiatus, serving as a feature reporter for the program. Visser left The NFL Today in 2004 to work as the lead reporter for top NFL games. She returned to the program two years later in 2006. Also during the 2000 season, former Chicago Bears and New Orleans Saints coach Mike Ditka joined the program as an analyst; Deion Sanders was added as an analyst in 2001.

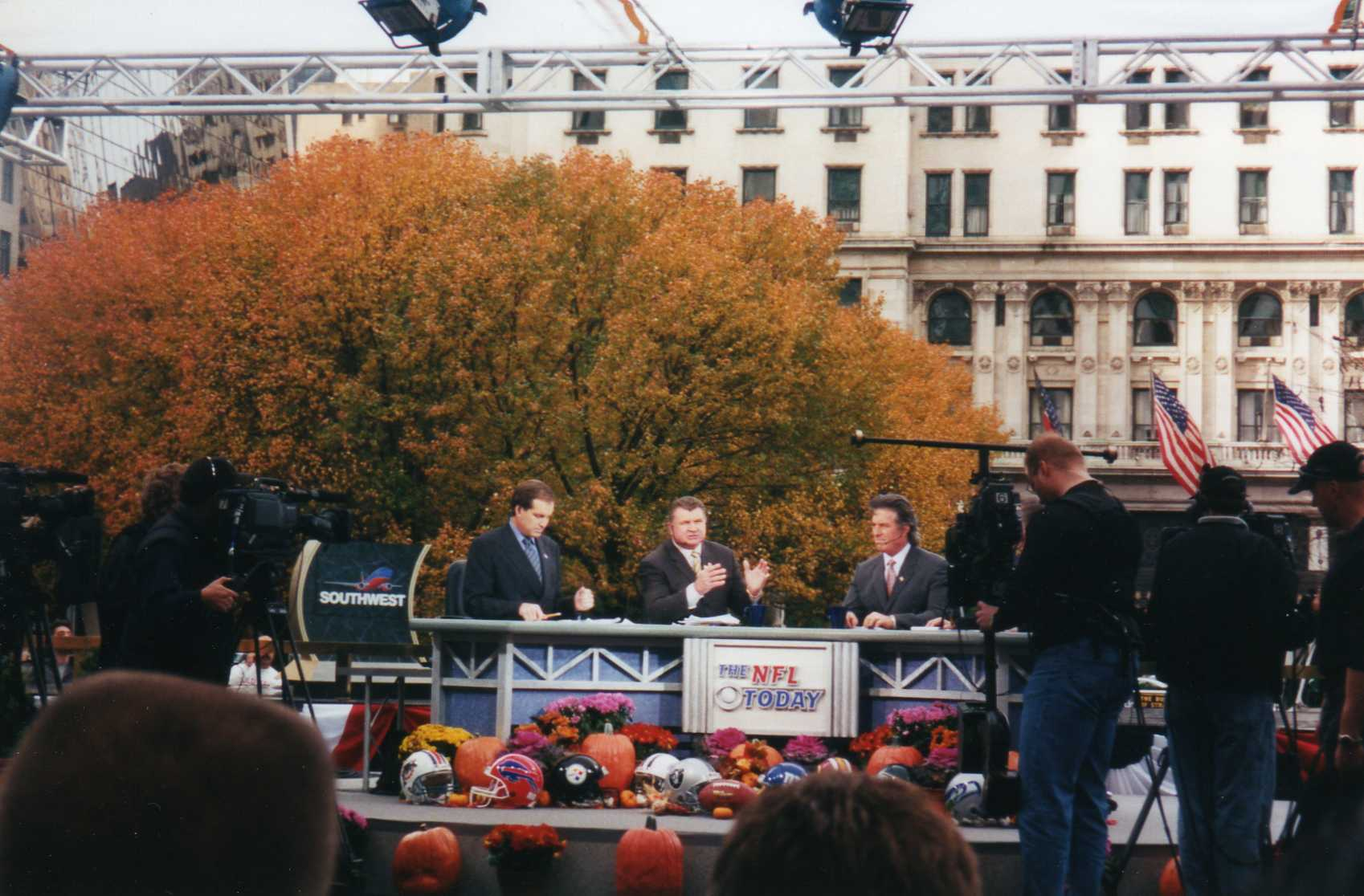
The NFL Today outdoor set, November 2001. Jim Nantz, Mike Ditka, and Randy Cross are the visible hosts.

For the 2000 NFL season, the program moved part-time from the CBS Broadcast Center to a new outdoor studio on the site of the General Motors Building, on Fifth Avenue and 59th Street in Manhattan. The set, which was used during the fall, was set up on Sunday mornings at a plaza in the area near the building that later became the glass structure of the Apple Fifth Avenue store, next to the southeast corner of Central Park. During the winter, The NFL Today was broadcast indoors from Studio 43 at the CBS Broadcast Center.

The program was rebooted again after the 2001 season with Dan Marino and Boomer Esiason joining Nantz and Sanders. Sanders left the broadcast team after Super Bowl XXXVIII to return to the NFL, playing for the Baltimore Ravens until 2004. Nantz followed shortly thereafter, being promoted to lead play-by-play broadcaster.

At the start of the 2003 NFL season, CBS Sports introduced Posthumus Zone as the new theme music for The NFL Today and for the network's NFL game telecasts. The song was composed by Los Angeles electronica group E.S. Posthumus, so named because it composes songs that have no-longer-existing ancient cities as a motif. In 2006, Posthumus Zone and a remixed version titled Rise to Glory were included as tracks on the group's second CD release, Rise to Glory. The song Rise to Glory was also featured on The NFL Today and on CBS' NFL broadcasts during the 2005 NFL season.

==== Second tenure of Greg Gumbel (2004–2005) ====
With Nantz moving to the lead broadcast team alongside Phil Simms, Gumbel returned to the studio to replace him on The NFL Today. Shannon Sharpe also joined the team to replace Sanders as an analyst. Sharpe's critics said that his broadcasting skills were hurt by his poor grammar and enunciation of words (Sharpe has a very noticeable lisp and drawl). This was parodied in a satire article in The Onion with the headline, "CBS Producers Ask Shannon Sharpe To Use At Least 3 Real Words Per Sentence."

The outdoor set was abandoned for the 2005 NFL season, with The NFL Today broadcasting from Studio 43 for the entire season. The following season (2006 NFL season), The NFL Today began broadcasting in high-definition television; the program introduced a new HD-ready set at Studio 43 with the conversion.

==== Under James Brown (2006–present) ====
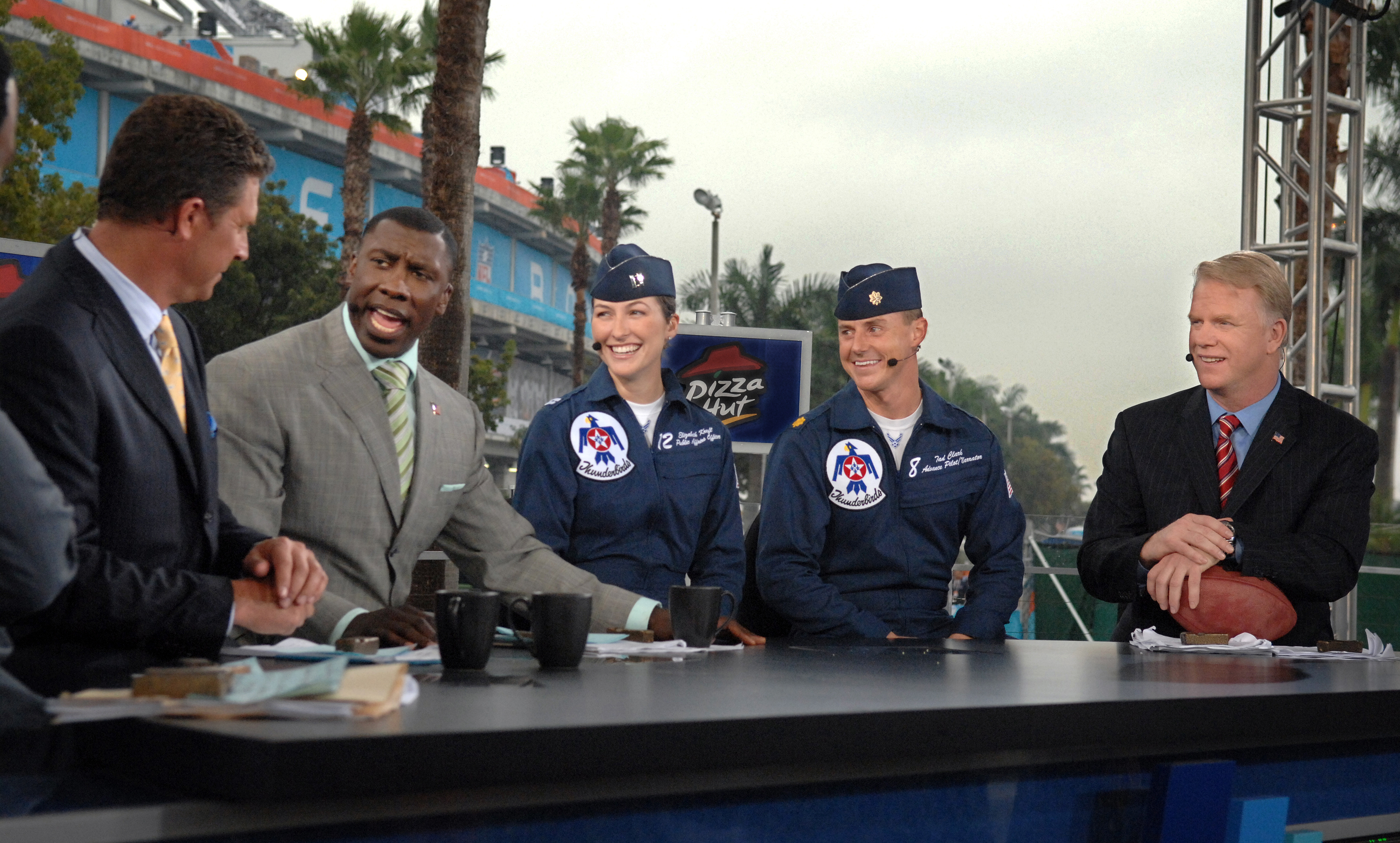
The NFL Today at Super Bowl XLI.

On February 6, 2006, CBS Sports announced the return of James Brown, who left CBS eleven years earlier to become studio host of Fox NFL Sunday, to the network as the host of The NFL Today beginning with the 2006 NFL season. Greg Gumbel moved back to play-by-play duties, teaming with Dan Dierdorf as part of its secondary announcing team, replacing Dick Enberg.

Lesley Visser returned to The NFL Today after a two-year hiatus in her previous role as feature reporter, a position she continues to hold to this day; meanwhile, Bonnie Bernstein left the network to pursue other broadcasting opportunities. Aside from Visser returning to the show, Sam Ryan joined CBS Sports in June 2006, as a reporter for The NFL Today; Ryan left the network after the 2010 NFL season. In 2007, CBS added a fifth member to its studio analyst table by adding then-recently retired head coach Bill Cowher.

In 2012, following the murder-suicide of Kansas City Chiefs linebacker Jovan Belcher and his girlfriend, Brown digressed on the program about the role that men needed to take in the fight against domestic violence. He accused the league's players of letting the NFL's reputation on domestic violence go unchanged.

Beginning with the 2013 NFL season, The NFL Today, along with all other CBS Sports presentations, switched to a 16x9 widescreen presentation that extended or placed graphics outside of the 4:3 safe area, with the network requiring cable television providers to use the #10 Active Format Description tag to present the broadcasts in a letterboxing format for viewers watching a CBS station's standard-definition television feed.

On February 18, 2014, CBS Sports announced that Sharpe and Marino were being relieved of their duties as on-air commentators, to be replaced by Tony Gonzalez and Bart Scott.

On February 5, 2014, the NFL announced that a deal with CBS to broadcast Thursday night games during the first eight weeks of the NFL season games beginning the 2014 NFL season in simulcast with NFL Network, with the remainder airing on NFL Network exclusively. With the addition of the package, CBS announced an additional NFL Today broadcast for the games, to be broadcast from the site of each week's game; with Brown and Cowher to be featured on both the Thursday and Sunday broadcasts, Deion Sanders returning to the program as an analyst for the Thursday editions, and while Esiason, Gonzalez and Scott remaining on the Sunday broadcasts.

During the first Thursday edition of The NFL Today on September 11, 2014, in the wake of the domestic violence controversy involving Baltimore Ravens running back Ray Rice, Brown spoke via satellite to CBS News anchor Scott Pelley and spoke face-to-face with CBS News correspondent Norah O'Donnell, who had interviewed NFL Commissioner Roger Goodell days before. Baltimore Ravens owner Steve Bisciotti also appeared in a taped interview with Brown. During the pre-game, Brown updated his 2012 digression about domestic violence, wondering why in the two years since his initial commentary, that nothing had been done to change the problem, and how the problem had actually become worse.

Scott and Gonzalez both left The NFL Today prior to the 2017 season, with Gonzalez switching networks to join Fox's pregame coverage. Phil Simms, who had been demoted from CBS's lead color commentator position when the network hired Tony Romo for that post, and Nate Burleson, who comes over from NFL Network, replaced Scott and Gonzalez.

In the 2023 season, former defensive end J. J. Watt joined The NFL Today as an analyst. In 2024, former quarterback Matt Ryan also joined the program. Esiason and Simms departed the network as their contracts expired at the end of the 2023 season.

For the 2025 season, Watt departed The NFL Today to become a CBS color commentator, while Adam Schein took over as anchor for in-game updates that had previously been handled by The NFL Today analysts. The show premiered a two-hour digital extension, The NFL Today+, which is streamed on CBS Sports' digital platforms (including CBS Sports HQ, YouTube, and Paramount+) at 10 a.m. ET prior to the main program at 12:00 p.m. After a trial for two regular season games in the 2024 season, CBS also announced that The NFL Today would broadcast on-site from selected regular season games throughout the season.

On September 21, 2025, The NFL Today broadcast a special edition to mark its 50th anniversary, which featured a 1970's throwback theme and tributes to the program's history. Brent Musburger also made a one-off return as a guest panelist.

Following the 2025 season, Matt Ryan departed the program to become the new president of football for the Atlanta Falcons organization. Russell Wilson retired from football to join the program as Ryan's replacement.

== Super Bowl editions ==
The NFL Today at the Super Bowl, previously known as The Super Bowl Today, is the edition of The NFL Today that precedes the Super Bowl during years when CBS has the rights to broadcast the game. The show is generally broadcast from the site of that year's game; in Super Bowl LVIII's case, for example, the show originated from the Las Vegas Strip, in addition to the on-site set at Allegiant Stadium in Las Vegas, NV.

== See also ==
- National Football League on television
- American Football Conference
- NFL on CBS
- Fox NFL Sunday
- Football Night in America
- List of programs broadcast by CBS
