= Les Friction =

Independent music group

- Origin: Los Angeles, California, U.S.
- Genres: Orchestral, symphonic rock, modern classical, alternative rock, electronic rock, industrial rock, rock opera
- Years active: 2011–present
- Labels: Mariposa Lane Music Inc./ Would Work Sound LLC
- Members: Helmut Vonlichten; Nihl Finch aka Evan Frankfort; Paint
- Website: lesfriction.com

Les Friction is an independent music group led by Helmut Vonlichten, Nihl Finch aka Evan Frankfort, and a singer named Paint. Helmut had previously collaborated with his brother Franz Vonlichten in their cinematic music project E.S. Posthumus until Franz's death in May 2010. Les Friction was announced in November 2011, and their self-titled debut album was released the following January.

== Albums ==
=== Les Friction ===
Les Friction

Studio album by Les Friction
- Released: January 24, 2012
- Genre: alternative rock, Orchestral, symphonic rock, modern classical, electronic rock, rock opera
- Label: Mariposa Lane Music Inc./ Would Work Sound LLC
- Producer: Les Friction

The band's debut album, Les Friction, was composed by Helmut Vonlichten and Nihl Finch aka Evan Frankfort.

The album's first single "Torture" was released as a digital download on November 26, 2011, the second single "Louder than Words" was released on December 27, 2011, while the final single "Here Comes the Reign" was released on January 21, 2012, prior to the album's release date of January 24, 2012.

==== Track listing ====
1. Louder than Words
2. Torture (feat. Guitarist Bruce Watson)
3. What You Need
4. Here Comes the Reign
5. World on Fire
6. Save Your Life
7. Sunday
8. String Theory
9. Come Back to Me (feat. Emily Valentine)

==== Digital instrumental tracks ====
Instrumental tracks were made available through iTunes, Amazon, and CDBaby MP3 album downloads.

1. Louder Than Words (Instrumental)
2. Torture (Instrumental)
3. What You Need (Instrumental)
4. Here Comes The Reign (Instrumental)
5. World On Fire (Instrumental)
6. Save Your Life (Instrumental)
7. Sunday (Instrumental)
8. String Theory (Instrumental)
9. Come Back To Me (Instrumental)

==== Usage ====
Portions of "Louder than Words" have been used in a trailer for Harry Potter and the Deathly Hallows – Part 2, Oz the Great and Powerful, and has also been played over the loudspeakers during the 2012 Rose Bowl.

=== Dark Matter ===
Dark Matter

Studio album by Les Friction
- Released: August 25, 2017
- Genre: alternative rock, Orchestral, symphonic rock, modern classical, electronic rock, rock opera
- Label: Mariposa Lane Music Inc./ Would Work Sound LLC
- Producer: Les Friction

The band's second album, Dark Matter, was composed by Nihl Finch aka Evan Frankfort (The Spiritual Machines), and Helmut Vonlichten.

==== Track listing ====
1. Your World Will Fail
2. Who Will Save You Now
3. Dark Matter
4. I Remember (feat. Emily Valentine)
5. Love Comes Home
6. You Always Knew (feat. Lara Fabian)
7. This Is a Call
8. Firewall
9. Your Voice
10. Make Believe
11. Kashmir

=== The End of the Beginning ===
The band's third album The End of the Beginning was released on June 6, 2022.

==== Track listing ====
1. The End of the Beginning
2. Unhuman
3. Collective Mind
4. Fade to Black
5. All That Mattered
6. Quiet War
7. No Remorse No Regrets
8. Game Ender
9. Black Smoke Assimilation
10. World with No Sun

== See also ==
- E.S. Posthumus
- Two Steps from Hell
