= The Republic of Wolves =

American indie rock band

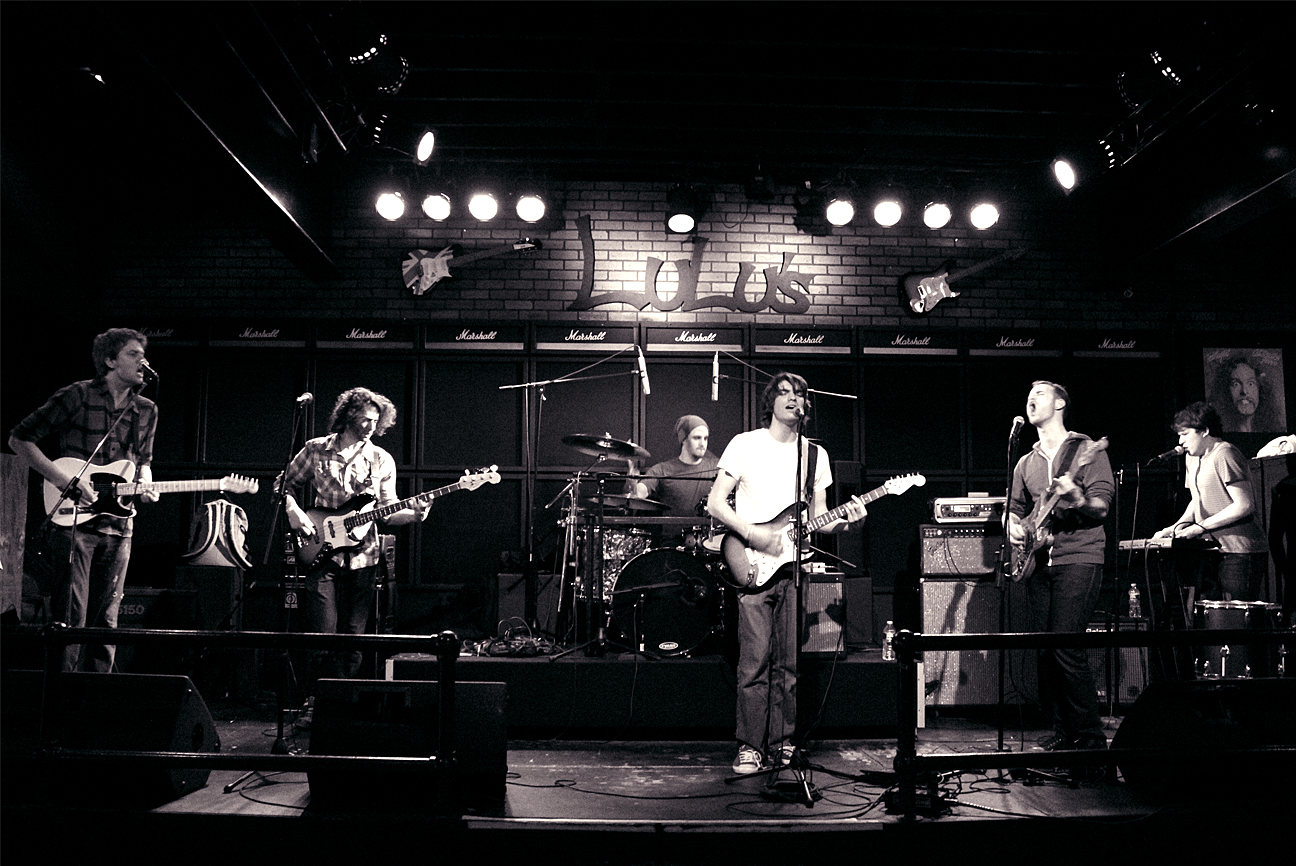
- The Republic of Wolves performing in 2010 at LuLu's Pub on Long Island

Background information
- Origin: Long Island, New York, United States
- Genres: Indie rock, alternative rock, folk, emo
- Years active: 2009–present
- Label: Unsigned / Simple Stereo (vinyl/distribution)
- Spinoff of: Tigers on Trains
- Members: Billy Duprey; Mason Maggio; Christian Van Deurs; Chris Wall
- Past members: Gregg Andrew DellaRocca; David Kaplan; Ryan Cullinane; Anthony Sampogna; Christopher Benedict
- Website: therepublicofwolves.com

The Republic of Wolves is an indie rock band from Long Island, New York. The band consists of lead singer Mason Maggio, guitarist Christian Van Deurs, drummer Chris Wall and keyboardist Billy Duprey.

Originally a side project of Maggio and Van Deurs' indie folk band Tigers on Trains, the Republic of Wolves gained popularity when a set of their demos was uploaded online and mistakenly believed to belong to fellow Long Island band Brand New. They have released three full-length albums.

== History ==
During the summer of 2009, Maggio and Van Deurs were recording the Tigers On Trains album Grandfather at Gregg Andrew DellaRocca's home studio. They began experimenting with a different, heavier, and more dynamic style of music with their friends Duprey and Wall and The Republic of Wolves was formed.

The Republic of Wolves has notable influences from other Long Island bands such as Brand New, Taking Back Sunday, Straylight Run, Glassjaw and As Tall As Lions. This influence was most obvious when clips of three The Republic of Wolves demos were posted onto YouTube as demos of Brand New songs from their then upcoming album Daisy. Initially, many Brand New fans could not tell whether these demos were legitimate or not. The band has said that they had no part in this incident, and when they found out about the faux demos they contacted the CEO of AbsolutePunk, Jason Tate, and the truth was revealed.

The band's debut EP His Old Branches was named "the best EP to be released in 2009" by AbsolutePunk. Punknews.org has noted that there are "some moments of brilliant restraint in their songs". The Republic of Wolves were placed on a list of the "Top 10 Indie Bands" in Substream Music Press magazine, in which they were described as having "dark sounds, slowly but forcefully delivered vocals, and aggressively smart lyrics."

On March 15, 2010, The Republic of Wolves, with the help of 410 BC, Vintage Hustle Records and Simple Stereo, held a contest in which they invited fans to cover any one of their songs from the EP His Old Branches, awarding prizes to the top entries.

Their first full-length album, Varuna, was released on November 30, 2010. The CD was self-released by the band and the vinyl was released by Simple Stereo.

On September 11, 2010, the band announced an upcoming extended play called The Cartographer, which was released digitally and on vinyl (by Simple Stereo). on January 1, 2011. On April 3, drummer Chris Wall announced that he was leaving the band on good terms.

Maggio graduated from Long Island's Stony Brook University in 2012 and soon after moved to the West Coast.

On January 6, 2013, the band uploaded a new track entitled "Consequence" on SoundCloud, with the description stating that it would appear on their upcoming album to be released "later this year". The band released their second full-length album No Matter How Narrow on December 17, 2013. The song did not appear on the standard version of the album, however. On January 11, 2014 the band made the track available for free download on the Simple Stereo website.

In September 2014, the band rejoined with their original drummer Chris Wall as they prepared for that year's upcoming Vans Warped Tour.

On May 5, 2017, the band's song Birdless Cage was featured on a compilation album benefiting the ACLU. The release was curated by John Nolan of fellow Long Island band Taking Back Sunday and also featured songs by Anti-Flag, Kevin Devine, Anthony Green, John-Allison Weiss, and Cassino.

Their third album Shrine was released on March 27, 2018. Exactly one year later, the band officially released an extended version of the album featuring 3 additional songs.

On September 22, 2021, the band was featured on a compilation album commemorating the 20th anniversary of the album Take Off Your Pants and Jacket by the pop-punk band Blink-182.

In 2020, singer Mason Maggio participated on Jeopardy!, becoming a two-time winner. In 2023, he returned to the show as a Champions Wildcard quarterfinalist.

On December 11, 2023, the band posted a cryptic teaser video to their social media pages. The very next day, they surprise-released their third official extended play Why Would Anyone Want to Live This Long? digitally on December 12, 2023. On December 29, 2023, the band released an acoustic cover of the song "A Long December" by Counting Crows. In February 2024, they released their first ever remix of their song "Nightjar" by The Kickdrums, adding that the track would be included as a digital download with the eventual vinyl release of Why Would Anyone Want to Live This Long?.

== Band members ==
Current

- Mason Maggio – guitar, vocals (2009–present)
- Billy Duprey – keyboard, percussion, vocals (2009–present)
- Christian Van Deurs – lead guitar, backing vocals (2009–present)
- Chris Wall – drums (2009–2011, 2014–present)

Past

- Ryan Cullinane – bass guitar, vocals (2010–2018; touring)
- Gregg Andrew Dellarocca – guitar, vocals (2009–2015)
- David Kaplan – bass guitar, vocals (2009–2010)
- Anthony Sampogna – drums (2013–2014; touring)
- Christopher Benedict – guitar (2013–2014; touring)

== Discography ==
=== Studio albums ===
- Varuna (Simple Stereo (vinyl), 2010)
- No Matter How Narrow (Simple Stereo (vinyl), 2013)
- Shrine (Simple Stereo (vinyl), 2018)

=== EPs ===
- His Old Branches (Vintage Hustle Records, 2009)
- The Cartographer (Simple Stereo (vinyl), 2011)
- Empty Vessels (Simple Stereo (digital), 2013)
- His Black Teeth (Simple Stereo (digital), 2015)
- Why Would Anyone Want to Live This Long? (2023)

=== Compilation albums ===
- In The House Of Dust (Simple Stereo, 2011)
- Covers (Vol. 1) (2014)
- Covers (Vol. 2) (2018)

=== Singles ===
- "Cardinals" (Simple Stereo, 2010)
- "Oarsman" (self-released, 2010)
- "Home" (self-released, 2011)
- "Consequence" (self-released, 2013)
- "Spare Key" (self-released, 2013)
- "Between His Black Teeth" (self-released, 2015)
- "Northern Orthodox" (self-released, 2016)
- "Mitama" (self-released, 2017)
- "Colored Out" (self-released, 2018)
- "Bask" (self-released, 2018)
- "Online Songs" (self-released, 2021)
- "Nightjar" (self-released, 2023)
- "A Long December" (self-released, 2023)
- "Nightjar (The Kickdrums Remix)" (self-released, 2024)
