= Posthumus Zone =

E.S. Posthumus song, theme tune to NFL on CBS

"Posthumus Zone" and "Granicus" are songs composed by the now-disbanded Los Angeles based electronic music group E.S. Posthumus for the TV programs NFL on CBS and The NFL Today on CBS Sports. The songs are played at the start and end of the programs, before and after commercial breaks, and during stoppages on the NFL on CBS play games, and on commercial spots that announce the programming schedule, as a sound trademark—a jingle for viewers to remember. The theme was first used for the NFL on CBS in 2003.

The songs were also used to introduce, conclude, and to segue to commercials on Westwood One's NFL game coverage and halftime programming. It has since been replaced with a new score commissioned by Westwood One since 2013.

"Posthumus Zone", just under a minute long, was released by E.S. Posthumus in January 2008 as a single on the iTunes Store and on Amazon MP3. In 2005, E.S. Posthumus also released the single "Rise to Glory," a remix of "Posthumus Zone" in association with DJ Quik with vocals from Bizarre.

Since 2016, the theme is used on The Price Is Right as the main theme in years CBS has the Super Bowl for the game show's Super Bowl-themed episode. This was used in daytime versions in L and LIII, and primetime versions in LVIII. (CBS had Super Bowl LV, but there was no themed episode because the signature prize, a trip to the game itself, could not be offered that season.)
