= Varuna (album) =

Studio album by The Republic of Wolves
- Released: November 30, 2010
- Recorded: 2010
- Genre: Indie rock, alternative, post-hardcore, folk rock
- Length: 60:07
- Label: Self-released, Simple Stereo (vinyl)
- Producer: The Republic of Wolves

The Republic of Wolves chronology
Varuna (2010)	No Matter How Narrow (2013)

Professional ratings
Review scores
Source	Rating
AbsolutePunk	91%
Alternative Press	4/5 stars
AlterThePress.com	5/5 stars
AOL	(favorable)
The Bay Area Native	5/5 stars
MindEqualsBlown.net	5/5 stars
TheMusicTheMessage.com	9.5/10 stars
PropertyOfZack.com	4.5/5 stars
Punknews.org	4/5 stars
Sputnikmusic	4.5/5 stars

Varuna is the debut album by the Long Island indie rock band The Republic of Wolves. It was originally released on iTunes and physically on their web store on November 30, 2010. It has also been released on vinyl record by Simple Stereo. The album was recorded, mixed, and mastered by guitarist/vocalist Gregg Andrew DellaRocca at his home studio and was produced by the band members themselves.

== Track listing ==
All songs written by Gregg Andrew DellaRocca, Billy Duprey, Mason Maggio, Christian Van Deurs, and Chris Wall.

No.	Title	Length
1.	"Varuna"	3:40
2.	"Woolen Blankets"	5:02
3.	"Sea Smoke"	3:47
4.	"Oarsman"	5:16
5.	"Pitch and Resin"	4:13
6.	"Monologues" (The song "Monologues" ends at 6:15. At minute 6:18, begins an untitled hidden song.)	7:18
7.	"Tuez Le Tous, Dieu Reconnaitra Les Siens"	2:53
8.	"Greek Fire"	5:42
9.	"The Attic"	3:57
10.	"You Missed the Point"	3:31
11.	"Grounded, I Am Traveling Light"	5:39
12.	"Tanzih"	4:34
13.	"Tashbih"	4:40

iTunes bonus tracks
No.	Title	Length
14.	"Stable"	4:42

Vinyl bonus tracks
No.	Title	Length
15.	"Rosary"	3:57
16.	"Monologues (Alternate Version)"	4:51

Deluxe Package bonus tracks
No.	Title	Length
17.	"Greek Fire (Acoustic)"	5:07
