= No Matter How Narrow =

Studio album by The Republic of Wolves
- Released: December 17, 2013
- Recorded: 2012–2013
- Genres: Indie rock, alternative, indie pop, post-hardcore, folk rock
- Length: 41:43
- Labels: Self-released, Simple Stereo (vinyl)
- Producer: The Republic of Wolves

The Republic of Wolves chronology
Varuna (2010)	No Matter How Narrow (2013)	Shrine (2018)

Professional ratings
Review scores
Source	Rating
AbsolutePunk	9/10 stars
Alternative Press	3.5/5 stars
Muzik Dizcovery	A−
Sputnikmusic	4/5 stars
Under The Gun Review	8/10 stars

No Matter How Narrow is the second album by the Long Island indie rock band The Republic of Wolves. It was originally released on iTunes and physically on their web store on December 17, 2013. It has also been released on vinyl record by Simple Stereo. The album was recorded in the band's home studio and was mixed by band member Mason Maggio. The album was mastered by Alex Saltz (APS Mastering, NYC).

== Track listing ==
All songs written by Mason Maggio, Billy Duprey, Christian Van Deurs, and Gregg Andrew Dellarocca.

- Tracks 1–5 and 7–11 feature Dan Gluszak (of Envy On The Coast) on drums.
- Track 6 features Will Noon (of Straylight Run and fun.) on drums.
- Tracks 6, 8, and 11 feature Natalie Kress on violin.
- Track 8 features a spoken monologue by Nate Dimeo.

No.	Title	Length
1.	"Frozen Feet"	3:10
2.	"Stray(s)"	4:53
3.	"Spare Key"	3:45
4.	"Greenville, MO"	3:50
5.	"Pioneers"	4:32
6.	"Keep Clean"	4:00
7.	"Arithmetic On The Frontier"	2:02
8.	"Turning Lane"	3:53
9.	"Vinedresser"	3:44
10.	"Orange Empire"	3:37
11.	"Through Empty Vessels"	4:21

Vinyl bonus tracks
No.	Title	Length
12.	"Javelin"	3:55
13.	"Consequence"	4:30
14.	"Panicked Leaps"	3:33
