= E.S. Posthumus =

American music group

- Origin: Los Angeles, California, United States
- Genres: New-age, neoclassical new-age, psybient, modern classical, symphonic rock
- Years active: 2000–2010
- Label: Wigshop Records
- Past members: Franz Vonlichten; Helmut Vonlichten
- Website: www.esposthumus.com

E.S. Posthumus was an independent music group that produced a form of 21st-century classical music/epic music that intertwined popular style drum rhythms with orchestral and electronic sounds. Their music is inspired by the Pythagorean philosophy which states that "music is the harmonization of opposites; the conciliation of warring elements". The E.S. is an acronym for "Experimental Sounds" while Posthumus (Latin postumus, meaning "last" or "born after father's death"; the English spelling is influenced by humus, "ground", "soil") is a word that is meant to represent "all things past", suggesting the music was inspired by things that have ended, some time after they ended.

== Career ==
The group was formed in 2000 by brothers Helmut and Franz Vonlichten. Helmut and Franz studied piano with their mother. After graduating from high school, Franz worked in recording studios while Helmut attended and graduated from UCLA, with a degree in archaeology. Their music has been licensed by many movie and television production studios, being included in numerous movie trailers and television shows. E.S. Posthumus released three albums overall in their career.

On July 22, 2010, it was officially announced that Franz had died about two months before from Foreign Body Obstruction (FBAO). After reporting his brother's death, Helmut stated that while there still may be one or two unreleased songs (one of them being their single "Christmas Eve" released in November 2010), the group would no longer be active. In November 2011, it was officially announced that Helmut Vonlichten had formed a new band called Les Friction, and released a preview of his new work with a track called "Torture".

== Albums ==
=== Unearthed ===
Unearthed was the first album composed by E.S. Posthumus. It was originally made available for purchase online through CD Baby in January 2001; It became the third-biggest selling album in CDBaby's history. The success of the album prompted the wide re-release to retail in May 2005 through Wigshop and 33rd Street Records/Bayside Distribution. A key piece to the distinctive sound of the music comes from working with the Northwest Sinfonia. Other musicians performing on this CD include Pedro Eustache, Michael Landau, Matt Laug, Lance Morrison, Davy Spillane and Efrain Toro. Many tracks from Unearthed have been featured in various movie trailers and television shows. They have been used in the trailers for movies due to their escalating structure, which makes them well-suited for dramatic montages building towards the credits in trailers.

=== Cartographer ===
Cartographer, the second album from E.S. Posthumus, was supposed to be released sometime in 2006 but was actually released in early 2007. It is rumored the delay was due to the addition of Sans to the group of musicians, an addition much heralded by Helmut Vonlichten

=== Makara ===
Makara is the third album of E.S. Posthumus. It consists of 15 tracks and was released on February 2, 2010, for download on iTunes, Amazon MP3, and several other popular download services. The album is available on both CD and for digital download at CD Baby. The album was made available on eMusic on January 26, 2010. There may also be a vinyl release of the album in the future.

== Singles ==
=== Rise to Glory ===
Rise to Glory is a single released in September 2005 featuring the vocals of rappers DJ Quik and Bizarre (from D12). The song Rise to Glory is recognized as a sung remix and an extended version of Posthumus Zone, which is most commonly recognized as the theme song to the NFL on CBS since the 2003 season.

=== Run This Town/Posthumus Zone ===
E.S. Posthumus collaborated with hip hop artist Jay-Z to create a remix of Run This Town and Posthumus Zone for the CBS broadcast of Super Bowl XLIV.

=== Christmas Eve ===
Christmas Eve is a single released in November 2010 as a Christmas tribute to Franz Vonlichten of E.S. Posthumus.

The Vonlichten brothers had begun work on a holiday project in early March 2010, which was to be released later during the holiday season. According to Helmut, the project would be a re-arrangement of their favorite holiday songs and "bring something new to the party". This track was the only song they started recording before Franz died in May 2010.

In a Facebook posting on the group's fanpage, mid-November 2010, Helmut relayed that "When Franz passed away last May, the project was barely off the ground; however, a lyric, piano sketch and rough vocal were completed on the new song." In that same posting, Helmut shared that he contacted Jeremy Lubbock, the brothers' childhood favorite arranger, to arrange the song for them. Helmut later salvaged the rough vocal recorded months earlier and included it in the final recording.

"Christmas Eve" is the last song produced from the group E.S. Posthumus and is a product of the Vonlichten brothers' last recording session before Franz's death.

== See also ==
- Les Friction
