= List of Super Bowl broadcasters =

The following is a list of Super Bowl broadcasters, encompassing all national American television and radio networks, as well as sports announcers who have covered the first four AFL-NFL World Championship Games and subsequent championship games of the National Football League. It excludes announcers who may have appeared on local radio broadcasts produced by participating teams' flagship stations.

Super Bowl I stands out as the only Super Bowl simultaneously broadcast in the U.S. by two different networks. At the time, NBC held the rights to nationally televise AFL games, while CBS had the rights for NFL games. Both networks covered the game using their own announcers, but NBC could only use the CBS feed instead of producing its own. Starting with Super Bowl II, NBC televised even years, and CBS odd years. This rotation continued through the 1970 AFL–NFL merger, when NBC gained the rights to televise AFC games, and CBS to broadcast NFC games. Despite ABC broadcasting Monday Night Football in 1970, it joined the Super Bowl rotation only from Super Bowl XIX, in January 1985. ABC, CBS, and NBC then continued to rotate the Super Bowl until 1994, when Fox replaced CBS as the NFC broadcaster. CBS then assumed NBC's place in the rotation after CBS replaced NBC as the AFC broadcaster in 1998. Due to new contracts signed in 2006, NBC took over Sunday Night Football from ESPN, took ABC's place in the Super Bowl rotation, and Monday Night Football moved from ABC to ESPN. It continued until new contracts took effect in 2024, allowing not only ABC to return and initiate a four-network rotation but also ESPN to air their first two Super Bowls.

The four-year rotation starting with Super Bowl LVIII also allows each broadcaster to offer simulcasts or alternative broadcasts on its sister networks and platforms. CBS's sister network Nickelodeon aired an alternate children-oriented telecast of Super Bowl LVIII. ABC's rights include ESPN simulcasts and alternative broadcasts on other ESPN networks.

The NFL broke the traditional broadcasting rotation at least twice, both times involving NBC, CBS, and Winter Olympics. NBC originally had broadcasting rights for Super Bowl XXVI, and CBS for Super Bowl XXVII. However, the NFL allowed the networks to switch the two games to provide CBS with a significant lead-in to its coverage of the 1992 Winter Olympics. Similarly, NBC was set to air Super Bowl LV and CBS Super Bowl LVI, but the networks agreed to swap the broadcasting rights. Therefore, CBS benefited from holding rights to the Super Bowl and the 2021 NCAA Final Four, while NBC paired its Super Bowl coverage with the 2022 Winter Olympics. Under the four-network rotation starting in 2024, the league awarded NBC or any network that airs the Winter Olympics the Super Bowl during Winter Olympic years.

CBS has televised the most Super Bowl games, with Super Bowl LV being its 21st, and it just completed the broadcast of its 22nd with Super Bowl LVIII in February 2024.

== Television ==
=== English language ===
Game	Date	Network	Play-by-play announcer	Color commentator(s)	Sideline reporter(s)	Rules expert(s)	Pregame host(s)	Pregame analyst(s)	Trophy presentation	Notes
I	January 15, 1967	CBS	Ray Scott (1st half); Jack Whitaker (2nd half)	Frank Gifford	Pat Summerall	Established for Super Bowl XLV	—N/a	—N/a	Pat Summerall	1
I	January 15, 1967	NBC	Curt Gowdy	Paul Christman	Charlie Jones	Established for Super Bowl XLV	Curt Gowdy	Johnny Unitas, Norm Van Brocklin, Jack Kemp, Lance Alworth, Don Meredith, and Johnny Sample	George Ratterman	1
II	January 14, 1968	CBS	Ray Scott	Pat Summerall and Jack Kemp	Frank Gifford and Jack Whitaker	Established for Super Bowl XLV	—N/a	—N/a	Frank Gifford	
III	January 12, 1969	NBC	Curt Gowdy	Kyle Rote and Al DeRogatis	Jim Simpson	Established for Super Bowl XLV	Curt Gowdy	Kyle Rote, Al DeRogatis, and Pat Summerall	Kyle Rote	
IV	January 11, 1970	CBS	Jack Buck	Pat Summerall	Frank Gifford and Jack Whitaker	Established for Super Bowl XLV	—N/a	—N/a	Frank Gifford	
V	January 17, 1971	NBC	Curt Gowdy	Kyle Rote	Bill Enis	Established for Super Bowl XLV	Curt Gowdy	Joe Namath	Kyle Rote	
VI	January 16, 1972	CBS	Ray Scott	Pat Summerall	Tom Brookshier	Established for Super Bowl XLV	Jack Whitaker	—N/a	Tom Brookshier	
VII	January 14, 1973	NBC	Curt Gowdy	Al DeRogatis	Bill Enis	Established for Super Bowl XLV	Curt Gowdy	Joe Namath	Bill Enis	
VIII	January 13, 1974	CBS	Ray Scott	Pat Summerall and Bart Starr	Tom Brookshier	Established for Super Bowl XLV	Jack Whitaker	—N/a	Tom Brookshier	
IX	January 12, 1975	NBC	Curt Gowdy	Al DeRogatis and Don Meredith	Charlie Jones	Established for Super Bowl XLV	Jack Perkins	Joe Namath and Don Meredith	Charlie Jones	
X	January 18, 1976	CBS	Pat Summerall	Tom Brookshier; Hank Stram (4th quarter)	—N/a	Established for Super Bowl XLV	Brent Musburger	Irv Cross, Phyllis George, and Jack Whitaker	Tom Brookshier and Sonny Jurgensen	
XI	January 9, 1977	NBC	Curt Gowdy	Don Meredith	—N/a	Established for Super Bowl XLV	Lee Leonard and Bryant Gumbel	John Brodie	Bryant Gumbel	
XII	January 15, 1978	CBS	Pat Summerall	Tom Brookshier	Paul Hornung and Nick Buoniconti	Established for Super Bowl XLV	Brent Musburger	Irv Cross, Phyllis George, and Jimmy "The Greek" Snyder	Gary Bender	
XIII	January 21, 1979	NBC	Curt Gowdy	John Brodie and Merlin Olsen	—N/a	Established for Super Bowl XLV	Dick Enberg	Bryant Gumbel, Mike Adamle, Donna De Varona, and Fran Tarkenton	Mike Adamle	
XIV	January 20, 1980	CBS	Pat Summerall	Tom Brookshier	—N/a	Established for Super Bowl XLV	Brent Musburger	Irv Cross, Jayne Kennedy, Jimmy "The Greek" Snyder, John Madden, and George Allen	Brent Musburger	
XV	January 25, 1981	NBC	Dick Enberg	Merlin Olsen	John Brodie and Len Dawson	Established for Super Bowl XLV	Bryant Gumbel	Mike Adamle, Pete Axthelm, and Bob Trumpy	Bryant Gumbel	
XVI	January 24, 1982	CBS	Pat Summerall	John Madden	Irv Cross and Phyllis George	Established for Super Bowl XLV	Brent Musburger	Irv Cross, Phyllis George, Jimmy "The Greek" Snyder, Terry Bradshaw, and Roger Staubach	Brent Musburger	
XVII	January 30, 1983	NBC	Dick Enberg	Merlin Olsen	Bill Macatee	Established for Super Bowl XLV	Len Berman	Mike Adamle, Pete Axthelm, and Ahmad Rashad	Mike Adamle	
XVIII	January 22, 1984	CBS	Pat Summerall	John Madden	Irv Cross and Jim Hill	Established for Super Bowl XLV	Brent Musburger	Pat O'Brien, Irv Cross, Phyllis George, Jimmy "The Greek" Snyder, Dick Vermeil, Charlsie Cantey, and Tom Brookshier	Brent Musburger	
XIX	January 20, 1985	ABC	Frank Gifford	Don Meredith and Joe Theismann	—N/a	Established for Super Bowl XLV	Al Michaels and Jim Lampley	O. J. Simpson and Tom Landry	Jim Lampley	
XX	January 26, 1986	NBC	Dick Enberg	Merlin Olsen and Bob Griese	Bill Macatee	Established for Super Bowl XLV	Bob Costas	Pete Axthelm and Ahmad Rashad	Bob Costas	
XXI	January 25, 1987	CBS	Pat Summerall	John Madden	Irv Cross and Will McDonough	Established for Super Bowl XLV	Brent Musburger	Irv Cross, Jimmy "The Greek" Snyder, Dan Dierdorf, Terry Bradshaw, and Joe Theismann	Brent Musburger	
XXII	January 31, 1988	ABC	Al Michaels	Frank Gifford and Dan Dierdorf	Jack Whitaker, Jim Hill, and Becky Dixon	Established for Super Bowl XLV	Keith Jackson	Lynn Swann and Mike Adamle	Keith Jackson	
XXIII	January 22, 1989	NBC	Dick Enberg	Merlin Olsen	Jim Gray	Established for Super Bowl XLV	Bob Costas and Gayle Gardner	Paul Maguire and Don Shula	Bob Costas	
XXIV	January 28, 1990	CBS	Pat Summerall	John Madden	Irv Cross and Will McDonough	Established for Super Bowl XLV	Brent Musburger	Irv Cross, Terry Bradshaw, Dick Butkus, Mike Ditka, Ken Stabler, and Dan Fouts	Brent Musburger	
XXV	January 27, 1991	ABC	Al Michaels	Frank Gifford and Dan Dierdorf	Lynn Swann and Jack Arute	Established for Super Bowl XLV	Brent Musburger	Dick Vermeil and Bob Griese	Brent Musburger	
XXVI	January 26, 1992	CBS	Pat Summerall	John Madden	Lesley Visser, Pat O'Brien, and Jim Gray	Established for Super Bowl XLV	Greg Gumbel	Terry Bradshaw, Dan Fouts, and Randy Cross	Lesley Visser	2
XXVII	January 31, 1993	NBC	Dick Enberg	Bob Trumpy	O. J. Simpson and Todd Christensen	Established for Super Bowl XLV	Bob Costas	Mike Ditka	Bob Costas	
XXVIII	January 30, 1994	NBC	Dick Enberg	Bob Trumpy	O. J. Simpson and Will McDonough	Established for Super Bowl XLV	Jim Lampley and Bob Costas	Mike Ditka and Joe Gibbs	Jim Lampley	3
XXIX	January 29, 1995	ABC	Al Michaels	Frank Gifford and Dan Dierdorf	Lynn Swann and Lesley Visser	Established for Super Bowl XLV	Brent Musburger	Dick Vermeil and Boomer Esiason	Brent Musburger	
XXX	January 28, 1996	NBC	Dick Enberg	Phil Simms and Paul Maguire	Jim Gray and Will McDonough	Established for Super Bowl XLV	Greg Gumbel and Ahmad Rashad	Mike Ditka, Joe Gibbs, and Joe Montana	Greg Gumbel	
XXXI	January 26, 1997	Fox	Pat Summerall	John Madden	Ron Pitts and Bill Maas	Established for Super Bowl XLV	James Brown	Terry Bradshaw, Howie Long, and Ronnie Lott	Terry Bradshaw	
XXXII	January 25, 1998	NBC	Dick Enberg	Phil Simms and Paul Maguire	Jim Gray and John Dockery	Established for Super Bowl XLV	Greg Gumbel and Ahmad Rashad	Cris Collinsworth, Sam Wyche, and Joe Gibbs	Greg Gumbel	
XXXIII	January 31, 1999	Fox	Pat Summerall	John Madden	Ron Pitts and Bill Maas	Established for Super Bowl XLV	James Brown	Terry Bradshaw, Howie Long, and Cris Collinsworth	Terry Bradshaw	
XXXIV	January 30, 2000	ABC	Al Michaels	Boomer Esiason	Lesley Visser and Lynn Swann	Established for Super Bowl XLV	Chris Berman	Steve Young	Mike Tirico	
XXXV	January 28, 2001	CBS	Greg Gumbel	Phil Simms	Armen Keteyian and Bonnie Bernstein	Established for Super Bowl XLV	Jim Nantz	Mike Ditka, Craig James, Randy Cross, and Jerry Glanville	Jim Nantz	
XXXVI	February 3, 2002	Fox	Pat Summerall	John Madden	Pam Oliver and Ron Pitts	Established for Super Bowl XLV	James Brown	Terry Bradshaw, Howie Long, and Cris Collinsworth	Terry Bradshaw	
XXXVII	January 26, 2003	ABC	Al Michaels	John Madden	Melissa Stark and Lynn Swann	Established for Super Bowl XLV	Chris Berman	Steve Young, Michael Strahan, and Brian Billick	Mike Tirico	
XXXVIII	February 1, 2004	CBS	Greg Gumbel	Phil Simms	Armen Keteyian and Bonnie Bernstein	Established for Super Bowl XLV	Jim Nantz	Dan Marino, Deion Sanders, and Boomer Esiason	Jim Nantz	
XXXIX	February 6, 2005	Fox	Joe Buck	Troy Aikman and Cris Collinsworth	Pam Oliver and Chris Myers	Established for Super Bowl XLV	James Brown	Terry Bradshaw, Howie Long, and Jimmy Johnson	Terry Bradshaw	
XL	February 5, 2006	ABC	Al Michaels	John Madden	Michele Tafoya and Suzy Kolber	Established for Super Bowl XLV	Chris Berman and Mike Tirico	Steve Young, Michael Irvin, and Tom Jackson (main set); Bill Belichick (2nd set)	Mike Tirico	
XLI	February 4, 2007	CBS	Jim Nantz	Phil Simms	Lesley Visser, Sam Ryan, Steve Tasker, and Solomon Wilcots	Established for Super Bowl XLV	James Brown	Dan Marino, Shannon Sharpe, and Boomer Esiason	Jim Nantz	
XLII	February 3, 2008	Fox	Joe Buck	Troy Aikman	Pam Oliver and Chris Myers	Established for Super Bowl XLV	Curt Menefee	Terry Bradshaw, Howie Long and Jimmy Johnson	Terry Bradshaw	
XLIII	February 1, 2009	NBC	Al Michaels	John Madden	Andrea Kremer and Alex Flanagan	Established for Super Bowl XLV	Bob Costas, Dan Patrick, and Keith Olbermann	Cris Collinsworth, Jerome Bettis, Tiki Barber, Matt Millen, Tony Dungy, Mike Holmgren, and Rodney Harrison	Dan Patrick	
XLIV	February 7, 2010	CBS	Jim Nantz	Phil Simms	Steve Tasker and Solomon Wilcots	Established for Super Bowl XLV	James Brown	Dan Marino, Bill Cowher, Shannon Sharpe, and Boomer Esiason	Jim Nantz	
XLV	February 6, 2011	Fox	Joe Buck	Troy Aikman	Pam Oliver and Chris Myers	Mike Pereira	Curt Menefee	Terry Bradshaw, Howie Long, Michael Strahan, and Jimmy Johnson	Terry Bradshaw	
XLVI	February 5, 2012	NBC	Al Michaels	Cris Collinsworth	Michele Tafoya	—N/a	Bob Costas and Dan Patrick	Tony Dungy, Rodney Harrison, Aaron Rodgers, and Hines Ward	Dan Patrick	
XLVII	February 3, 2013	CBS	Jim Nantz	Phil Simms	Steve Tasker, Solomon Wilcots, and Tracy Wolfson	—N/a	James Brown and Greg Gumbel	Dan Marino, Bill Cowher, Shannon Sharpe, Boomer Esiason, Clay Matthews, and Larry Fitzgerald	Jim Nantz	
XLVIII	February 2, 2014	Fox	Joe Buck	Troy Aikman	Pam Oliver and Erin Andrews	Mike Pereira	Curt Menefee	Howie Long, Michael Strahan, and Jimmy Johnson	Michael Strahan	4
XLIX	February 1, 2015	NBC	Al Michaels	Cris Collinsworth	Michele Tafoya	—N/a	Bob Costas and Dan Patrick	Tony Dungy, Rodney Harrison, Hines Ward, and John Harbaugh	Dan Patrick	
50	February 7, 2016	CBS	Jim Nantz	Phil Simms	Tracy Wolfson, Evan Washburn, and Jay Feely	Mike Carey	James Brown, Ian Eagle, and Greg Gumbel	Tony Gonzalez, Bill Cowher, Bart Scott, Boomer Esiason, Sean Payton, Brandon Marshall, Trent Green, Steve Smith Sr., and Amy Trask	Jim Nantz	
LI	February 5, 2017	Fox	Joe Buck	Troy Aikman	Erin Andrews and Chris Myers	Mike Pereira	Curt Menefee	Terry Bradshaw, Howie Long, Michael Strahan, and Jimmy Johnson	Terry Bradshaw	
LII	February 4, 2018	NBC	Al Michaels	Cris Collinsworth	Michele Tafoya	—N/a	Dan Patrick and Liam McHugh	Tony Dungy, Rodney Harrison, Chris Simms, and John Harbaugh	Dan Patrick	
LIII	February 3, 2019	CBS	Jim Nantz	Tony Romo	Tracy Wolfson, Evan Washburn, and Jay Feely	Gene Steratore	James Brown and Ian Eagle	Phil Simms, Bill Cowher, Nate Burleson, Boomer Esiason, Russell Wilson, and Von Miller	Jim Nantz	
LIV	February 2, 2020	Fox	Joe Buck	Troy Aikman	Erin Andrews and Chris Myers	Mike Pereira	Curt Menefee	Terry Bradshaw, Howie Long, Michael Strahan, and Jimmy Johnson	Terry Bradshaw	
LV	February 7, 2021	CBS	Jim Nantz	Tony Romo	Tracy Wolfson, Evan Washburn, and Jay Feely	Gene Steratore	James Brown and Ian Eagle	Phil Simms, Bill Cowher, Nate Burleson, Boomer Esiason, and Charles Davis	Jim Nantz	5
LVI	February 13, 2022	NBC; Peacock	Al Michaels	Cris Collinsworth	Michele Tafoya and Kathryn Tappen	Terry McAulay	Mike Tirico, Maria Taylor, and Jac Collinsworth	Tony Dungy, Rodney Harrison, Chris Simms, and Drew Brees	Mike Tirico	5
LVII	February 12, 2023	Fox	Kevin Burkhardt	Greg Olsen	Erin Andrews and Tom Rinaldi	Mike Pereira	Curt Menefee	Terry Bradshaw, Howie Long, Michael Strahan, Jimmy Johnson, and Rob Gronkowski	Terry Bradshaw	5
LVIII	February 11, 2024	CBS; Paramount+	Jim Nantz	Tony Romo	Tracy Wolfson, Evan Washburn, and Jay Feely	Gene Steratore	James Brown and Ian Eagle	Phil Simms, Bill Cowher, Nate Burleson, Boomer Esiason, J. J. Watt, Charles Davis, Matt Ryan, and Jason McCourty	Jim Nantz	6
LVIII	February 11, 2024	Nickelodeon	Noah Eagle	Nate Burleson, SpongeBob SquarePants (Tom Kenny), Patrick Star (Bill Fagerbakke), and Larry the Lobster (Mr. Lawrence)	Young Dylan (Dylan Gilmer), Dylan Schefter, and Sandy Cheeks (Carolyn Lawrence)	Dora the Explorer (Diana Zermeño) and Boots (Asher Colton Spence)	Noah Eagle		—N/a	6
LIX	February 9, 2025	Fox; Tubi	Kevin Burkhardt	Tom Brady	Erin Andrews and Tom Rinaldi	Mike Pereira	Curt Menefee	Terry Bradshaw, Howie Long, Michael Strahan, Jimmy Johnson, and Rob Gronkowski	Terry Bradshaw	
LX	February 8, 2026	NBC; Peacock	Mike Tirico	Cris Collinsworth	Melissa Stark and Kaylee Hartung	Terry McAulay	Maria Taylor, Jac Collinsworth, and Noah Eagle	Devin McCourty, Jason Garrett, Tony Dungy, Rodney Harrison, Chris Simms, Kyle Shanahan, Fred Warner, Aaron Donald, and Cameron Heyward	Maria Taylor	
LXI	February 14, 2027	ABC; ESPN; ESPN DTC; Disney+ NFL+ Hulu	Joe Buck	Troy Aikman	Lisa Salters and Laura Rutledge	Russell Yurk	Scott Van Pelt and TBD	TBD	TBA	
LXI	February 14, 2027	ESPN2 (Manningcast)	Peyton Manning and Eli Manning	TBD						
LXI	February 14, 2027	ESPNU (Field Pass With The Pat McAfee Show)	Pat McAfee	Dan Orlovsky and Darius Butler	TBD					
LXI	February 14, 2027	NFL Network (MNF Playbook with Next Gen Stats)	TBD							
LXII	February 13, 2028	CBS; Paramount+	TBD							
LXIII	2029	Fox; Fox One	TBD							
LXIV	2030	NBC; Peacock	TBD							
LXV	2031	ABC; ESPN; ESPN DTC	TBD							
LXVI	2032	CBS; Paramount+	TBD							7
LXVII	2033	Fox; Fox One	TBD							7
LXVIII	2034	NBC; Peacock	TBD							7

==== Notes ====
- ^Note 1: Super Bowl I was simulcast on both CBS (at the time the sole NFL network) and NBC (the AFL network). From Super Bowl II onward, the networks began rotating exclusive coverage of the game on an annual basis. Super Bowls I–VI were blacked out in the television markets of the host cities, due to league restrictions then in place.
- ^Note 2: The 1989 television contract (which was in effect) gave CBS Super Bowl XXVI instead of Super Bowl XXVII, which was in their rotation. The NFL swapped the CBS and NBC years in an effort to give CBS enough lead-in programming for the upcoming 1992 Winter Olympics two weeks later.
- ^Note 3: The television contract for 1990–1993 had each network having one Super Bowl telecast of the first three games as part of the package. The fourth Super Bowl (XXVIII) was up for a separate sealed bid. NBC won the bid, and since they were last in the rotation for Super Bowl coverage in the regular contract, ended up with two straight Super Bowls. CBS is the only other network to televise two Super Bowls (I and II) in a row. It is also of note that Super Bowls XXVII and XXVIII are the first (and to date, only) back-to-back Super Bowls to feature the same two teams (Dallas Cowboys and Buffalo Bills).
- ^Note 4: Michael Strahan was a last-minute substitute for the Vince Lombardi Trophy presentation ceremony, as Terry Bradshaw (who has normally covered the Lombardi Trophy presentation ceremonies for Super Bowls airing on Fox) left the New Jersey/New York area the day before Super Bowl XLVIII to fly home due to the death of his father.
- ^Note 5: Under the 2013 television contract, Super Bowl LV was originally assigned to NBC, while Super Bowl LVI was originally assigned to CBS. In March 2019, CBS agreed to trade Super Bowl LVI to NBC in exchange for Super Bowl LV so that the former would not have to compete against the 2022 Winter Olympics in Beijing.
- ^Note 6: CBS's sister network Nickelodeon aired an alternate children-oriented telecast of Super Bowl LVIII. This marked the first time that an alternative broadcast of the game aired on the broadcaster's sister network.
- ^Note 7: The contracts for CBS, Fox, and NBC have an opt-out clause after the 2029 season, or after Super Bowl LXIV in early 2030 (ESPN/ABC's contract's opt-out clause is instead after the 2030 season, or after Super Bowl LXV in early 2031).

==== See also ====
- The NFL Today
- Fox NFL Sunday
- The NFL on NBC pregame show
  - Football Night in America
- Monday Night Countdown

=== Spanish language ===
Game	Date	Network	Play-by-play announcer	Color commentator(s)	Reporter(s)	Notes
XXXVII	January 26, 2003	ABC (SAP)	Roberto Abramowitz	David Crommett	—N/a	
XXXVIII	February 1, 2004	CBS (SAP)	Armando Quintero	Benny Ricardo	—N/a	
XXXIX	February 6, 2005	Fox (SAP)	John Laguna	Pepe Mantilla	—N/a	
XL	February 5, 2006	ABC (SAP)	Álvaro Martín	Raul Allegre	—N/a	
XLI	February 4, 2007	CBS (SAP)	Armando Quintero	Benny Ricardo	—N/a	
XLII	February 3, 2008	Fox (SAP)	John Laguna	Pepe Mantilla	—N/a	
XLIII	February 1, 2009	NBC (SAP)	René Giraldo	Edgar López	—N/a	
XLIV	February 7, 2010	CBS (SAP)	Armando Quintero	Benny Ricardo	—N/a	
XLV	February 6, 2011	Fox (SAP)	John Laguna	Francisco X. Rivera and Brady Poppinga	Tony Santiago and Rodrigo Arana	
XLVI	February 5, 2012	NBC (SAP)	René Giraldo	Edgar López	Verónica Contreras	
XLVII	February 3, 2013	CBS (SAP)	Armando Quintero	Benny Ricardo	—N/a	
XLVIII	February 2, 2014	Fox (SAP); Fox Deportes	John Laguna	Francisco X. Rivera and Brady Poppinga	Tony Santiago and Rodrigo Arana	
XLIX	February 1, 2015	NBC (SAP); NBC Universo	René Giraldo	Edgar López	Verónica Contreras	
50	February 7, 2016	ESPN Deportes	Álvaro Martín	Raul Allegre	John Sutcliffe	
LI	February 5, 2017	Fox Deportes	John Laguna	Jessi Losada and Brady Poppinga	Pablo Alsina	
LII	February 4, 2018	NBC (SAP); Universo	René Giraldo	Edgar López	Verónica Contreras	
LIII	February 3, 2019	ESPN Deportes	Álvaro Martín	Raul Allegre	John Sutcliffe	
LIV	February 2, 2020	Fox Deportes	Adrián García Márquez	Rolando Cantú	Jaime Motta	
LV	February 7, 2021	ESPN Deportes	Ciro Procuna	Pablo Viruega	John Sutcliffe	
LVI	February 13, 2022	NBC (SAP); Universo	René Giraldo	Edgar López	Verónica Contreras	
LVI	February 13, 2022	Telemundo	Carlos Mauricio Ramirez	Jorge Andres	Ariana Figuera	
LVII	February 12, 2023	Fox (SAP); Fox Deportes	Adrián García Márquez	Alejandro Villanueva	—N/a	
LVIII	February 11, 2024	CBS (SAP)	Armando Quintero	Benny Ricardo	—N/a	
LVIII	February 11, 2024	Univision; Vix Premium	Ramsés Sandoval; Guillermo Schutz	Diana Flores; Martín Gramática	Alejandro Berry	
LIX	February 9, 2025	Fox (SAP); Fox Deportes	Adrián García Márquez	Jessi Losada and Jaime Motta	Rodolfo Landeros	
LIX	February 9, 2025	Telemundo	Miguel Gurwitz	Rolando Cantú	—N/a	
LX	February 8, 2026	NBC (SAP); Universo; Telemundo	Miguel Gurwitz	Rolando Cantú	Diego Arrioja	
LXI	February 14, 2027	ESPN Deportes	TBD			
LXI	February 14, 2027	Univision; Vix Premium	TBD			
LXII	February 13, 2028	CBS (SAP)	TBD			
LXIII	2029	Fox (SAP); Fox Deportes	TBD			
LXIV	2030	NBC (SAP); Universo; Telemundo	TBD			
LXV	2031	ESPN Deportes	TBD			
LXVI	2032	CBS (SAP)	TBD			
LXVII	2033	Fox (SAP); Fox Deportes	TBD			
LXVIII	2034	NBC (SAP); Universo; Telemundo	TBD			

== Radio ==
Game	Date	Network	Play-by-play announcer	Color commentator(s)	Sideline reporter(s)	Rules analyst(s)	Pregame host(s)	Pregame analyst(s)
I	January 15, 1967	CBS	Jack Drees	Tom Hedrick				
I	January 15, 1967	NBC	Jim Simpson	George Ratterman				
II	January 14, 1968	CBS	Jack Drees	Tom Hedrick				
III	January 12, 1969	NBC	Charlie Jones	George Ratterman and Pat Summerall				
IV	January 11, 1970	CBS	Bob Reynolds	Tom Hedrick				
V	January 17, 1971	NBC	Jay Randolph	Al DeRogatis				
VI	January 16, 1972	CBS	Andy Musser	Ray Geracy				
VII	January 14, 1973	NBC	Jim Simpson	Kyle Rote				
VIII	January 13, 1974	CBS	Andy Musser	Bob Tucker				
IX	January 12, 1975	NBC	Jim Simpson	John Brodie				
X	January 18, 1976	CBS	Ed Ingles	Jim Kelly				
XI	January 9, 1977	NBC	Jim Simpson	John Brodie				
XII	January 15, 1978	CBS	Jack Buck	Jim Kelly and Sonny Jurgensen				
XIII	January 21, 1979	CBS	Jack Buck	Hank Stram	Brent Musburger		Pat Summerall	
XIV	January 20, 1980	CBS	Jack Buck	Hank Stram			Dick Stockton	
XV	January 25, 1981	CBS	Jack Buck	Hank Stram	Irv Cross		Dick Stockton and Brent Musburger	
XVI	January 24, 1982	CBS	Jack Buck	Hank Stram			Dick Stockton	
XVII	January 30, 1983	CBS	Jack Buck	Hank Stram			Dick Stockton and Brent Musburger	
XVIII	January 22, 1984	CBS	Jack Buck	Hank Stram			Dick Stockton	
XIX	January 20, 1985	CBS	Jack Buck	Hank Stram	Irv Cross		Brent Musburger	
XX	January 26, 1986	NBC	Don Criqui	Bob Trumpy			Stan Martyn	
XXI	January 25, 1987	NBC	Don Criqui	Bob Trumpy			Bob Costas	
XXII	January 31, 1988	CBS	Jack Buck	Hank Stram			Brent Musburger	
XXIII	January 22, 1989	CBS	Jack Buck	Hank Stram	Irv Cross and Will McDonough		Brent Musburger	
XXIV	January 28, 1990	CBS	Jack Buck	Hank Stram; Randy Cross (fourth quarter)			Brent Musburger	
XXV	January 27, 1991	CBS	Jack Buck	Hank Stram			Greg Gumbel	
XXVI	January 26, 1992	CBS	Jack Buck	Hank Stram			Greg Gumbel	
XXVII	January 31, 1993	CBS	Jack Buck	Hank Stram			Greg Gumbel	
XXVIII	January 30, 1994	CBS	Jack Buck	Hank Stram			Greg Gumbel	
XXIX	January 29, 1995	CBS	Jack Buck	Hank Stram			Jim Hunter	
XXX	January 28, 1996	CBS/Westwood One	Jack Buck	Hank Stram			Jim Hunter	
XXXI	January 26, 1997	CBS/Westwood One	Howard David	Matt Millen			Jim Hunter	
XXXII	January 25, 1998	CBS/Westwood One	Howard David	Matt Millen			Jim Hunter	
XXXIII	January 31, 1999	CBS/Westwood One	Howard David	Matt Millen	John Dockery		Tommy Tighe	
XXXIV	January 30, 2000	CBS/Westwood One	Howard David	Matt Millen	John Dockery		Tommy Tighe	
XXXV	January 28, 2001	CBS/Westwood One	Howard David	Matt Millen and Boomer Esiason	John Dockery and James Lofton		Tommy Tighe	
XXXVI	February 3, 2002	CBS/Westwood One	Howard David	Boomer Esiason	John Dockery and James Lofton		Jim Gray and Tommy Tighe	
XXXVII	January 26, 2003	CBS/Westwood One	Marv Albert	Boomer Esiason	John Dockery and Warren Moon		Jim Gray	
XXXVIII	February 1, 2004	CBS/Westwood One	Marv Albert	Boomer Esiason	John Dockery and John Riggins		Jim Gray and Beasley Reece	
XXXIX	February 6, 2005	CBS/Westwood One	Marv Albert	Boomer Esiason	John Dockery and Bonnie Bernstein		Jim Gray and Dave Sims	
XL	February 5, 2006	CBS/Westwood One	Marv Albert	Boomer Esiason	John Dockery and Bonnie Bernstein		Jim Gray, Beasley Reece, and Josh Elliott	
XLI	February 4, 2007	CBS/Westwood One	Marv Albert	Boomer Esiason	John Dockery and Bonnie Bernstein		Jim Gray	
XLII	February 3, 2008	CBS/Westwood One	Marv Albert	Boomer Esiason	John Dockery and Kevin Kiley		Jim Gray and Tommy Tighe	
XLIII	February 1, 2009	CBS/Westwood One	Marv Albert	Boomer Esiason	John Dockery and Mark Malone		Jim Gray and Tommy Tighe	
XLIV	February 7, 2010	CBS/Westwood One	Marv Albert	Boomer Esiason	John Dockery and Mark Malone		Jim Gray and Scott Graham	
XLV	February 6, 2011	CBS/Westwood One	Kevin Harlan	Boomer Esiason	John Dockery and Mark Malone		Jim Gray and Scott Graham	
XLVI	February 5, 2012	Dial Global	Kevin Harlan	Boomer Esiason	John Dockery and Mark Malone		Jim Gray and Scott Graham	
XLVII	February 3, 2013	Dial Global	Kevin Harlan	Boomer Esiason	John Dockery and Mark Malone		Jim Gray and Scott Graham	
XLVIII	February 2, 2014	Westwood One	Kevin Harlan	Boomer Esiason	James Lofton and Mark Malone		Jim Gray and Scott Graham	
XLIX	February 1, 2015	Westwood One	Kevin Harlan	Boomer Esiason	James Lofton and Mark Malone		Jim Gray and Scott Graham	
50	February 7, 2016	Westwood One	Kevin Harlan	Boomer Esiason and Dan Fouts	James Lofton and Mark Malone		Jim Gray and Scott Graham	
LI	February 5, 2017	Westwood One	Kevin Harlan	Boomer Esiason and Mike Holmgren	James Lofton and Tony Boselli		Jim Gray and Scott Graham	
LII	February 4, 2018	Westwood One	Kevin Harlan	Boomer Esiason and Mike Holmgren	Ed Werder and Tony Boselli		Jim Gray and Scott Graham	
LIII	February 3, 2019	Westwood One	Kevin Harlan	Kurt Warner and Mike Holmgren	Ed Werder and Tony Boselli		Jim Gray and Scott Graham	
LIV	February 2, 2020	Westwood One	Kevin Harlan	Kurt Warner	Laura Okmin and Tony Boselli	Gene Steratore	Jim Gray and Scott Graham	
LV	February 7, 2021	Westwood One	Kevin Harlan	Kurt Warner	Laura Okmin and Tony Boselli		Jim Gray and Scott Graham	
LVI	February 13, 2022	Westwood One	Kevin Harlan	Kurt Warner	Laura Okmin and Mike Golic	Gene Steratore	Scott Graham	Willie McGinest
LVII	February 12, 2023	Westwood One	Kevin Harlan	Kurt Warner	Laura Okmin and Mike Golic	Gene Steratore	Scott Graham	Ryan Harris
LVIII	February 11, 2024	Westwood One	Kevin Harlan	Kurt Warner	Laura Okmin and Mike Golic	Dean Blandino	Scott Graham	Devin McCourty
LIX	February 9, 2025	Westwood One	Kevin Harlan	Kurt Warner	Laura Okmin	Gene Steratore	Scott Graham	Devin McCourty and Ross Tucker
LX	February 8, 2026	Westwood One	Kevin Harlan	Kurt Warner	Laura Okmin	Gene Steratore	Scott Graham	Ryan Harris
LXI	February 14, 2027	Westwood One	Kevin Harlan	Kurt Warner	Laura Okmin	Gene Steratore	Scott Graham	TBD
LXII	February 13, 2028	Westwood One	TBD	TBD	TBD	TBD	TBD	TBD
LXIII	2029	Westwood One	TBD	TBD	TBD	TBD	TBD	TBD
LXIV	2030	Westwood One	TBD	TBD	TBD	TBD	TBD	TBD
