= 2025–26 NFL playoffs =

American football tournament

- Dates: January 10 – February 8, 2026
- Season: 2025
- Teams: 14
- Games played: 13
- Super Bowl LX site: Levi's Stadium; Santa Clara, California
- Defending champions: Philadelphia Eagles
- Champion: Seattle Seahawks (2nd title)
- Runner-up: New England Patriots
- Conference runners-up: Denver Broncos; Los Angeles Rams
NFL playoffs
← 2024–25	2026–27 →

The National Football League playoffs for the 2025 season began on January 10, 2026, and concluded with Super Bowl LX on February 8 at Levi's Stadium in Santa Clara, California where the Seattle Seahawks defeated the New England Patriots for the franchise's second title.

This is the first postseason since 2014 not to feature the Kansas City Chiefs. Additionally, it marks the first postseason since 1998 not to feature Peyton Manning, Tom Brady or Patrick Mahomes.

It is also the first postseason since 2022 to not feature either number one seed from the previous season – the Kansas City Chiefs and Detroit Lions.

A total of 12 fourth-quarter lead changes occurred in the first four of the six wild card games played. These four games (Rams–Panthers, Packers–Bears, Bills–Jaguars and 49ers–Eagles) were decided by a winning touchdown inside the final three minutes.

== Participants ==
Within each conference, the four division winners and the top three non-division winners with the best overall regular season records qualified for the playoffs. The four division winners are seeded 1–4 based on their overall won-lost-tied record, and the wild card teams are seeded 5–7. The NFL does not use a fixed bracket playoff system, and there are no restrictions regarding teams from the same division matching up in any round. In the first round, dubbed the Wild Card playoffs, the second-seeded division winner hosts the seventh seed wild card, the third seed hosts the sixth seed, and the fourth seed hosts the fifth seed. The 1 seed from each conference receives a first-round bye. In the second round, the Divisional playoffs, the number 1 seed hosts the lowest-seeded surviving team from the first round (seed 4, 5, 6, or 7), while the other two surviving teams play each other, with the higher-seeded team hosting. The two surviving teams from each conference's divisional playoff games then meet in the respective AFC and NFC Conference Championships, hosted by the higher seed. Although the Super Bowl, the championship round of the playoffs, is played at a neutral site, the designated home team is based on an annual rotation by conference.

Playoff seeds
Seed	AFC	NFC
1	Denver Broncos (West winner)	Seattle Seahawks (West winner)
2	New England Patriots (East winner)	Chicago Bears (North winner)
3	Jacksonville Jaguars (South winner)	Philadelphia Eagles (East winner)
4	Pittsburgh Steelers (North winner)	Carolina Panthers (South winner)
5	Houston Texans (wild card)	Los Angeles Rams (wild card)
6	Buffalo Bills (wild card)	San Francisco 49ers (wild card)
7	Los Angeles Chargers (wild card)	Green Bay Packers (wild card)

== Bracket ==
Jan 10 – Bank of America Stadium	Jan 18 – Soldier Field
5	LA Rams	34
4	Carolina	31
5	LA Rams	20*
Jan 25 – Lumen Field
Jan 10 – Soldier Field	2	Chicago	17
NFC
7	Green Bay	27	5	LA Rams	27
Jan 17 – Lumen Field
2	Chicago	31	1	Seattle	31
NFC Championship
Jan 11 – Lincoln Financial Field	6	San Francisco	6
1	Seattle	41
6	San Francisco	23
Divisional round	Feb 8 – Levi's Stadium
3	Philadelphia	19
Wild-card round
N1	Seattle	29
Jan 12 – Acrisure Stadium	Jan 18 – Gillette Stadium	A2	New England	13
Super Bowl LX
5	Houston	30
4	Pittsburgh	6
5	Houston	16
Jan 25 – Empower Field at Mile High
Jan 11 – Gillette Stadium	2	New England	28
AFC
7	LA Chargers	3	2	New England	10
Jan 17 – Empower Field at Mile High
2	New England	16	1	Denver	7
AFC Championship
Jan 11 – EverBank Stadium	6	Buffalo	30
1	Denver	33*
6	Buffalo	27
3	Jacksonville	24

* Indicates overtime victory

== Schedule ==
Round	Away team	Score	Home team	Date	Kickoff (ET / UTC–5)	National TV network(s)	Streaming	Viewers (millions)	TV rating
Wild-card round	Los Angeles Rams	34–31	Carolina Panthers	January 10, 2026	4:30 p.m.	Fox	Fox One	28.0	12.8
Wild-card round	Green Bay Packers	27–31	Chicago Bears	January 10, 2026	8:00 p.m.	—N/a (Note: Prime Video's game was simulcast locally on WGBA in Green Bay, WITI in Milwaukee and WFLD in Chicago.)	Prime Video	31.6	12.5
Wild-card round	Buffalo Bills	27–24	Jacksonville Jaguars	January 11, 2026	1:00 p.m.	CBS	Paramount+	32.7	15.7
Wild-card round	San Francisco 49ers	23–19	Philadelphia Eagles	January 11, 2026	4:30 p.m.	Fox	Fox One	41.0	18.6
Wild-card round	Los Angeles Chargers	3–16	New England Patriots	January 11, 2026	8:15 p.m.	NBC	Peacock	28.9	12.5
Wild-card round	Houston Texans	30–6	Pittsburgh Steelers	January 12, 2026	8:15 p.m.	ESPN/ABC	ESPN DTC	29.1	15.1
Divisional round	Buffalo Bills	30–33 (OT)	Denver Broncos	January 17, 2026	4:30 p.m.	CBS	Paramount+	39.6	21.0
Divisional round	San Francisco 49ers	6–41	Seattle Seahawks	January 17, 2026	8:20 p.m.	Fox	Fox One	32.0	13.8
Divisional round	Houston Texans	16–28	New England Patriots	January 18, 2026	3:00 p.m.	ESPN/ABC	ESPN DTC	38.0	27.5
Divisional round	Los Angeles Rams	20–17 (OT)	Chicago Bears	January 18, 2026	6:30 p.m.	NBC	Peacock	45.4	18.4
Conference championships	New England Patriots	10–7	Denver Broncos	January 25, 2026	3:00 p.m.	CBS	Paramount+	48.6	22.8
Conference championships	Los Angeles Rams	27–31	Seattle Seahawks	January 25, 2026	6:30 p.m.	Fox	Fox One	46.0	20.9
Super Bowl LX Levi's Stadium Santa Clara, California	Seattle Seahawks	29–13	New England Patriots	February 8, 2026	6:30 p.m.	NBC	Peacock	125.6	39.7

== Wild-card round ==
=== Saturday, January 10, 2026 ===
==== NFC: Los Angeles Rams 34, Carolina Panthers 31 ====
NFC: Los Angeles Rams vs. Carolina Panthers – Game summary

Quarter	1	2	3	4	Total
Rams	7	10	3	14	34
Panthers	0	14	3	14	31

at Bank of America Stadium, Charlotte, North Carolina

- Date: January 10, 2026
- Game time: 4:30 p.m. EST
- Game weather: Mostly cloudy, 72 °F (22 °C)
- Game attendance: 73,426
- Referee: Clete Blakeman
- TV announcers (Fox): Joe Davis, Greg Olsen, Pam Oliver and Kristina Pink
- Recap, Game Book

Game information

First quarter

- LAR – Puka Nacua 14-yard pass from Matthew Stafford (Harrison Mevis kick), 11:35. Rams 7–0. Drive: 4 plays, 45 yards, 1:51.

Second quarter

- LAR – Puka Nacua 5-yard run (Harrison Mevis kick), 12:16. Rams 14–0. Drive: 7 plays, 48 yards, 4:01.
- CAR – Chuba Hubbard 1-yard run (Ryan Fitzgerald kick), 8:53. Rams 14–7. Drive: 7 plays, 65 yards, 3:23.
- LAR – Harrison Mevis 46-yard field goal, 5:24. Rams 17–7. Drive: 6 plays, 37 yards, 3:29.
- CAR – Bryce Young 16-yard run (Ryan Fitzgerald kick), 0:37. Rams 17–14. Drive: 5 plays, 81 yards, 0:54.

Third quarter

- CAR – Ryan Fitzgerald 46-yard field goal, 7:29. Tied 17–17. Drive: 13 plays, 59 yards, 7:08.
- LAR – Harrison Mevis 42-yard field goal, 4:17. Rams 20–17. Drive: 9 plays, 46 yards, 3:12.

Fourth quarter

- CAR – Chuba Hubbard 3-yard run (Ryan Fitzgerald kick), 14:34. Panthers 24–20. Drive: 4 plays, 62 yards, 1:40.
- LAR – Kyren Williams 13-yard pass from Matthew Stafford (Harrison Mevis kick), 8:47. Rams 27–24. Drive: 11 plays, 67 yards, 5:47.
- CAR – Jalen Coker 7-yard pass from Bryce Young (Ryan Fitzgerald kick), 2:39. Panthers 31–27. Drive: 4 plays, 30 yards, 1:33.
- LAR – Colby Parkinson 19-yard pass from Matthew Stafford (Harrison Mevis kick), 0:38. Rams 34–31. Drive: 7 plays, 71 yards, 2:01.

Top passers

- LAR – Matthew Stafford – 24/42, 304 yards, 3 TD, INT
- CAR – Bryce Young – 21/39, 264 yards, TD, INT

Top rushers

- LAR – Kyren Williams – 13 rushes, 57 yards
- CAR – Chuba Hubbard – 13 rushes, 46 yards, 2 TD

Top receivers

- LAR – Puka Nacua – 10 receptions, 111 yards, TD
- CAR – Jalen Coker – 9 receptions, 134 yards, TD

This was the second playoff meeting between these two teams, following the Carolina Panthers' 29–23 win over the then-St. Louis Rams in the 2003 NFC Divisional Round in the opening seconds of the second overtime. This was the Panthers' first home playoff game since the 2015 NFC Championship Game, in which they beat the Arizona Cardinals 49–15 to reach Super Bowl 50. In Week 13 of this season, the Panthers upset the Rams, 31–28.

The Panthers entered their first playoff game since the 2017 season as the largest home underdog in NFL playoff history. Cam Newton, the quarterback for the Panthers' last postseason game, banged the 'Keep Pounding' drum before the game. The Panthers received the ball from the opening kickoff, but were stopped on their own 45-yard line after failing on fourth down. The Rams responded quickly with a 14-yard touchdown pass from Matthew Stafford to Puka Nacua. With 1:24 left in the first quarter, Rams cornerback Cobie Durant intercepted Bryce Young on the Rams' 44-yard line. After the pick, the Rams scored on a backwards pass to Nacua, who took it in for a 5-yard run. The Panthers responded with a 7-play, 65-yard drive that was capped by a 1-yard touchdown run from Chuba Hubbard to cut the score to 14–7, but a Harrison Mevis field goal on the next possession put the Rams up by 10. After forcing the Panthers to punt, Los Angeles then punted themselves, only for Panthers returner Trevor Etienne to muff the catch, allowing Troy Reeder to recover the ball on the Carolina 41-yard line. They managed to get into the red zone, but were stopped on fourth down at Carolina's 19-yard line. The Panthers made their way down the field thanks to a 28-yard pass interference penalty and a 37-yard completion to Jalen Coker, before Bryce Young scrambled 16 yards into the end zone to reduce the deficit to 3 points with 44 seconds left in the half. The Panthers' ensuing kickoff fell short of the landing zone, giving the Rams the ball on their own 40-yard line. Stafford connected with Davante Adams to move the Rams just inside Carolina territory, but on third down from the 46-yard line, the usually sure-handed Nacua dropped a long pass that would have scored a touchdown; instead, the Rams had to punt and the Panthers knelt out the half with the score at 17–14.

After forcing the Rams to go three-and-out to open the second half, the Panthers tied the score at 17 thanks to a 46-yard field goal by rookie kicker Ryan Fitzgerald with 7:29 left in the third quarter. Aided by a 15-yard unnecessary roughness penalty by Nick Scott for a helmet-to-helmet hit on Davante Adams, the Rams went ahead three minutes later on a 42-yard field goal by Mevis. Mike Jackson picked off Stafford after the Rams stopped the Panthers on fourth down near midfield. On the last play of the third quarter, Young connected with Jalen Coker on a 52-yard catch-and-run. Carolina scored a touchdown two plays later on a 3-yard run by Hubbard in the opening seconds of the fourth quarter to take a 24–20 lead. It was Hubbard's second rushing touchdown of the game after scoring just once in the regular season from the ground. The Rams immediately answered back with a 11-play, 67-yard drive on a Stafford 13-yard pass and run to Kyren Williams to go ahead 27–24. Plagued by special teams mishaps all year, the Rams' punt was blocked on their own 30-yard line by Isaiah Simmons. A few plays later from the 7-yard line, Young found Coker in the back of the endzone to put the Panthers up 31–27 with 2:39 left. Stafford then drove the Rams down the field on a 71-yard drive that saw him pass on each of its seven plays, capped by a Colby Parkinson 19-yard sideline catch to take a 34–31 lead with 38 seconds left. This proved to be the game-winner, as the Panthers went four-and-out on their last possession of the game.

Despite injuring a finger on his throwing hand and not completing a pass on seven straight passes from the second through the third quarter, Stafford finished with 24 completions on 42 attempts, with 304 yards, three touchdowns and one interception; he also surpassed Kurt Warner for the most postseason passing yards and completions in Rams history. Nacua had 10 receptions for 111 yards and a touchdown. For the Panthers, Bryce Young went 21–40 on 264 yards with one touchdown and an interception in his playoff debut. Jalen Coker had 9 catches on 134 yards and a touchdown. Chuba Hubbard scored two touchdowns on the ground.

==== NFC: Chicago Bears 31, Green Bay Packers 27 ====
Green Bay Packers vs. Chicago Bears – Game summary

Quarter	1	2	3	4	Total
Packers	7	14	0	6	27
Bears	3	0	3	25	31

at Soldier Field, Chicago, Illinois

- Date: January 10, 2026
- Game time: 7:00 p.m. CST/8:00 p.m. EST
- Game weather: Mostly cloudy, 32 °F (0 °C)
- Game attendance: 60,338
- Referee: Adrian Hill
- TV announcers (Prime Video): Al Michaels, Kirk Herbstreit and Kaylee Hartung
- Recap, Game Book

Game information

First quarter

- CHI – Cairo Santos 27-yard field goal, 7:02. Bears 3–0. Drive: 16 plays, 59 yards, 7:58.
- GB – Christian Watson 7-yard pass from Jordan Love (Brandon McManus kick), 2:06. Packers 7–3. Drive: 9 plays, 85 yards, 4:56.

Second quarter

- GB – Jayden Reed 18-yard pass from Jordan Love (Brandon McManus kick), 6:46. Packers 14–3. Drive: 10 plays, 87 yards, 5:37.
- GB – Romeo Doubs 1-yard pass from Jordan Love (Brandon McManus kick), 1:56. Packers 21–3. Drive: 8 plays, 32 yards, 3:19.

Third quarter

- CHI – Cairo Santos 34-yard field goal, 10:07. Packers 21–6. Drive: 8 plays, 48 yards, 3:46.

Fourth quarter

- CHI – Cairo Santos 51-yard field goal, 13:29. Packers 21–9. Drive: 7 plays, 2 yards, 2:06.
- CHI – D'Andre Swift 5-yard run (Cairo Santos kick), 10:08. Packers 21–16. Drive: 7 plays, 66 yards, 2:30.
- GB – Matthew Golden 23-yard pass from Jordan Love (kick failed), 6:36. Packers 27–16. Drive: 7 plays, 46 yards, 1:34.
- CHI – Olamide Zaccheaus 8-yard pass from Caleb Williams (Caleb Williams–Colston Loveland), 4:18. Packers 27–24. Drive: 10 plays, 76 yards, 2:18.
- CHI – D. J. Moore 25-yard pass from Caleb Williams (Cairo Santos kick), 1:43. Bears 31–27. Drive: 6 plays, 66 yards, 1:08.

Top passers

- GB – Jordan Love – 24/46, 323 yards, 4 TD
- CHI – Caleb Williams – 24/48, 361 yards, 2 TD, 2 INT

Top rushers

- GB – Josh Jacobs – 19 rushes, 55 yards
- CHI – D'Andre Swift – 13 rushes, 54 yards, TD

Top receivers

- GB – Romeo Doubs – 8 receptions, 124 yards, TD
- CHI – Colston Loveland – 8 receptions, 137 yards

This was the third playoff meeting between the two longtime rivals. In the 2010 NFC Championship Game, the Packers defeated the Bears, 21–14, en route to their fourth Super Bowl championship. Chicago won the only prior meeting in the 1941 NFL Western Division Championship. This was the rubber match between the NFC North rivals, as the Packers defeated the Bears in their first meeting on December 7 at Lambeau Field and the Bears returned the favor erasing a 10-point fourth-quarter deficit to beat the Packers on December 20 at Soldier Field.

The Packers dominated the first half, scoring touchdowns on their first three offensive possessions. Quarterback Jordan Love, returning from a concussion suffered against the Bears in Week 16, threw touchdown passes to Christian Watson, Jayden Reed and Romeo Doubs. Green Bay's defense stifled Chicago's offense with an interception and two fourth-down stops, holding the Bears to a lone field goal. By halftime, the Packers held a 21–3 lead and had out-gained the Bears 231 to 122 in the first half.

The momentum started to shift in the third quarter. Chicago's defense forced a punt on each of Green Bay's first four second-half possessions. The Bears chipped away at the lead with two field goals from Cairo Santos and a 6-yard touchdown run by D'Andre Swift, closing the gap to 21–16 with just over ten minutes remaining. Green Bay briefly halted the comeback when Matthew Golden scored a 23-yard touchdown on a screen pass. However, kicker Brandon McManus missed the extra point, leaving the score at 27–16. Chicago responded with an 8-yard touchdown strike from Caleb Williams to Olamide Zaccheaus, followed by a successful two-point conversion to Colston Loveland to make the score 27–24.

With under three minutes remaining, McManus missed a 44-yard field goal that would have extended Green Bay's lead. Taking over with 2:51 left, Williams engineered a 6-play, 66-yard drive culminating in a go-ahead 25-yard touchdown pass to D. J. Moore. Green Bay reached the Chicago's 28-yard line on their final drive. As time expired, Love fumbled the snap and heaved a desperate pass into the end zone that was deflected by Kyler Gordon, sealing the Chicago Bears' first playoff victory since 2011. The Bears outgained the Packers 323 to 190 in the second half.

For the Bears, it was their seventh fourth-quarter comeback of the season. Meanwhile, the Packers lost their fifth consecutive game. Caleb Williams finished with 361 passing yards, completing 24 of 48 passes with two touchdowns and two interceptions, breaking the record for most passing yards in a playoff game for a Bears' quarterbacks in his playoff debut. Rookie tight-end Colston Loveland had eight receptions for 137 yards. Love finished with 323 passing yards, completing 24 of 46 passes with four touchdowns and no interceptions. Romeo Doubs had eight receptions for 124 yards and a touchdown.

In a viral speech after the game to his team, Bears head coach Ben Johnson yelled "Fuck the Packers! Fuck them", further igniting the rivalry between the two teams in his first season as coach.

=== Sunday, January 11, 2026 ===
==== AFC: Buffalo Bills 27, Jacksonville Jaguars 24 ====
Buffalo Bills vs. Jacksonville Jaguars – Game summary

Quarter	1	2	3	4	Total
Bills	3	7	3	14	27
Jaguars	0	7	3	14	24

at EverBank Stadium, Jacksonville, Florida

- Date: January 11, 2026
- Game time: 1:00 p.m. EST
- Game weather: Cloudy, 62 °F (17 °C)
- Game attendance: 70,250
- Referee: Brad Allen
- TV announcers (CBS): Jim Nantz, Tony Romo and Tracy Wolfson
- Recap, Game Book

Game information

First quarter

- BUF – Matt Prater 50-yard field goal, 2:54. Bills 3–0. Drive: 4 plays, 1 yard, 2:21.

Second quarter

- JAX – Brian Thomas Jr. 3-yard pass from Trevor Lawrence (Cam Little kick), 14:14. Jaguars 7–3. Drive: 7 plays, 65 yards, 3:40.
- BUF – Josh Allen 2-yard run (Matt Prater kick), 5:37. Bills 10–7. Drive: 10 plays, 92 yards, 5:42.

Third quarter

- BUF – Matt Prater 47-yard field goal, 8:12. Bills 13–7. Drive: 11 plays, 45 yards, 6:48.
- JAX – Cam Little 43-yard field goal, 5:47. Bills 13–10. Drive: 6 plays, 40 yards, 2:25.

Fourth quarter

- JAX – Parker Washington 6-yard pass from Trevor Lawrence (Cam Little kick), 12:55. Jaguars 17–13. Drive: 11 plays, 62 yards, 6:03.
- BUF – Dalton Kincaid 15-yard pass from Josh Allen (Matt Prater kick), 8:56. Bills 20–17. Drive: 9 plays, 65 yards, 3:59.
- JAX – Travis Etienne 14-yard pass from Trevor Lawrence (Cam Little kick), 4:03. Jaguars 24–20. Drive: 10 plays, 77 yards, 4:53.
- BUF – Josh Allen 1-yard run (Matt Prater kick), 1:04. Bills 27–24. Drive: 9 plays, 66 yards, 2:59.

Top passers

- BUF – Josh Allen – 28/35, 273 yards, TD
- JAX – Trevor Lawrence – 18/30, 207 yards, 3 TD, 2 INT

Top rushers

- BUF – James Cook – 15 rushes, 46 yards
- JAX – Travis Etienne – 10 rushes, 67 yards

Top receivers

- BUF – Khalil Shakir – 12 receptions, 82 yards
- JAX – Parker Washington – 7 receptions, 107 yards, TD

This was the third playoff match-up between the Bills and Jaguars, with the Jaguars winning the previous two games in 1996 and 2017 (both in the Wild Card round). The 1996 win was Jacksonville's first playoff victory in their franchise history. With the Kansas City Chiefs not qualifying for the postseason for the first time since 2014, the Bills now own the longest consecutive playoff appearance streak at seven. The Bills and Jaguars did not meet in the regular season.

The Bills started the scoring late into the first quarter after a Trevor Lawrence interception led to a Matt Prater 50-yard field goal. Highlighted by three Bhayshul Tuten runs of 47 yards combined, the Jaguars scored a touchdown on a 3-yard pass from Lawrence to Brian Thomas Jr. in the opening seconds of the second quarter; afterwards, Tuten would only have one more carry the rest of the game. Ray Davis then fumbled the kickoff return to Jacksonville, but they could not capitalize off the turnover after failing on a 4th-and-2 Trevor Lawrence QB run on Buffalo's 9-yard line. The Bills offense responded for their first touchdown of the day, capping off a 10-play, 92-yard drive with a Josh Allen QB run to take a 10–7 lead; on the short 2-yard run, Allen looked like he hurt his knee, but did not miss any time afterwards. Jaguars kicker Cam Little missed a 54-yard field goal, which would have tied the score just before halftime.

The Bills opened the second half with the ball and went up 13–7 on a Prater field goal after a 6:48 drive stalled at Jacksonville's 29-yard line. Little then cut the lead to three with a successful 43-yard field goal. 2:45 into the fourth quarter, Lawrence zipped a 6-yard pass to Parker Washington, who had been checked for a concussion earlier in the game, for a touchdown to take a 17–13 lead. The Bills briefly retook the lead four minutes later after an Allen touchdown pass to Dalton Kincaid for 15-yards. In the third lead change in the fourth quarter, the Jaguars scored a touchdown on a pass and run from Lawrence to Travis Etienne for 14-yards to go up 24–20 with 4:03 left in the game. Buffalo went back in front with 1:02 left after Jacksonville, with no more timeouts left, conceded a Josh Allen tush push at the 1-yard line. The play before, the Bills were successful on a tush push on 4th-and-inches for 9-yards that set up the touchdown and the fourth lead change of the quarter. On the first play of what turned out to be their last drive, Cole Bishop intercepted a Lawrence pass that was deflected off Tre'Davious White intended for Jakobi Meyers, to seal the Bills' first playoff road win in 33 years.

==== NFC: San Francisco 49ers 23, Philadelphia Eagles 19 ====
San Francisco 49ers vs. Philadelphia Eagles – Game summary

Quarter	1	2	3	4	Total
49ers	7	3	0	13	23
Eagles	6	7	3	3	19

at Lincoln Financial Field, Philadelphia, Pennsylvania

- Date: January 11, 2026
- Game time: 4:30 p.m. EST
- Game weather: Cloudy, 46 °F (8 °C)
- Game attendance: 69,879
- Referee: Alan Eck
- TV announcers (Fox): Kevin Burkhardt, Tom Brady, Erin Andrews and Tom Rinaldi
- Recap, Game Book

Game information

First quarter

- SF – Demarcus Robinson 2-yard pass from Brock Purdy (Eddy Pineiro kick), 11:51. 49ers 7–0. Drive: 6 plays, 76 yards, 3:09.
- PHI – Dallas Goedert 1-yard run (kick failed), 6:16. 49ers 7–6. Drive: 10 plays, 63 yards, 5:35.

Second quarter

- PHI – Dallas Goedert 9-yard pass from Jalen Hurts (Jake Elliott kick), 6:08. Eagles 13–7. Drive: 16 plays, 94 yards, 9:00.
- SF – Eddy Pineiro 36-yard field goal, 2:50. Eagles 13–10. Drive: 6 plays, 59 yards, 3:18.

Third quarter

- PHI – Jake Elliott 41-yard field goal, 2:11. Eagles 16–10. Drive: 10 plays, 23 yards, 5:11.

Fourth quarter

- SF – Christian McCaffrey 29-yard pass from Jauan Jennings (Eddy Pineiro kick), 14:52. 49ers 17–16. Drive: 5 plays, 67 yards, 2:19.
- PHI – Jake Elliott 33-yard field goal, 8:00. Eagles 19–17. Drive: 8 plays, 47 yards, 3:55.
- SF – Christian McCaffrey 4-yard pass from Brock Purdy (kick failed), 2:54. 49ers 23–19. Drive: 10 plays, 66 yards, 5:06.

Top passers

- SF – Brock Purdy – 18/31, 262 yards, 2 TD, 2 INT
- PHI – Jalen Hurts – 20/35, 168 yards, TD

Top rushers

- SF – Christian McCaffrey – 15 rushes, 48 yards
- PHI – Saquon Barkley – 26 rushes, 106 yards

Top receivers

- SF – Demarcus Robinson – 6 receptions, 111 yards, TD
- PHI – Devonta Smith – 8 receptions, 70 yards

This was a rematch of the 2022 NFC Championship Game, which the Eagles won, 31–7. The 49ers won the only other prior playoff match-up, in the 1996 NFC Wild Card Game. The Eagles and 49ers did not meet in the regular season.

Demarcus Robinson starred on the first possession of the game, catching a 61-yard pass and run from Brock Purdy and scoring a 2-yard goal line touchdown, to take the early 7–0 lead. The Eagles scored a touchdown on their first possession by virtue of a Dallas Goedert end-around from the 1-yard line, but Jake Elliott missed the extra-point. With 6:08 left in the second quarter, the referees picked up an illegal block downfield flag after Jalen Hurts found Goedert on a 9-yard touchdown pass to take a 13–7 lead. Star tight end George Kittle was carted off the field on the 49ers' next possession, which later revealed to be an Achilles tear. The 6-play 49ers drive ended on an Eddy Piñeiro 36-yard field goal. On the last play of the half without any timeouts, Purdy fumbled the ball out of bounds before Piñeiro had a chance to attempt a long field goal, thus the clock ran off 10 seconds and the score remained 13–10 at halftime. Earlier in the second quarter, head coach Nick Sirianni and receiver A. J. Brown had to be separated on the sidelines after Sirianni confronted Brown for dropping a pass.

The third quarter saw a combined 106 yards from both offenses, including a Brock Purdy interception. The only points in the third quarter were the Eagles extending their lead to six on a Jake Elliot 41-yards field goal 2:35 left in the quarter. The 49ers scored a touchdown at the start of the fourth quarter on an end-around pass from wide receiver Jauan Jennings to Christian McCaffrey for 29 yards to lead by one point, 17–16. All-Pro Quinyon Mitchell picked off Purdy for the second time in the game at 12:04 in the fourth quarter, his third interception in the last two postseasons for the Eagles. The Eagles then went on a 8-play, 47-yard drive that was stalled in the red zone, with the team having to settle for a 33-yard field goal from Elliot to retake the lead at 19–17. The 49ers quickly responded with a 10-play, 66-yard drive that ended with a Purdy to McCaffrey 4-yard touchdown pass with 2:54 remaining in the game to go ahead 23–19; instead of going for the two-point conversion to go up six points, head coach Kyle Shanahan elected to kick the extra-point, which Piñeiro missed. Hurts led Philadelphia down the field, including a 4th-and-5 conversion on a 15-yard pass to Goedert on the Eagles own 40-yard line, but for like much of the Eagles offense in the second half, the drive stalled inside San Francisco's half of the field. Their quest for back-to-back championships ended after failing to pick up a first down inside San Francisco's 21-yard line.

This was the Eagles' first home loss in the playoffs under head coach Nick Sirianni (2021–present). The 49ers out-gained the Eagles by only 54 yards throughout the game, but the Eagles were unable to take advantage of two Brock Purdy interceptions, going three-and-out after each interception. Philadelphia's offensive coordinator, Kevin Patullo, also received tremendous backlash from fans online for his play-calling in the second half, and he was subsequently fired after the game.

==== AFC: New England Patriots 16, Los Angeles Chargers 3 ====
Los Angeles Chargers vs. New England Patriots – Game summary

Quarter	1	2	3	4	Total
Chargers	0	3	0	0	3
Patriots	0	6	3	7	16

at Gillette Stadium, Foxborough, Massachusetts

- Date: January 11, 2026
- Game time: 8:15 p.m. EST
- Game weather: Clear, 35 °F (2 °C)
- Game attendance: 64,628
- Referee: Ron Torbert
- TV announcers (NBC): Mike Tirico, Cris Collinsworth and Melissa Stark
- Recap, Game Book

Game information

First quarter

- No scoring plays

Second quarter

- NE – Andrés Borregales 23-yard field goal, 13:32. Patriots 3–0. Drive: 14 plays, 93 yards, 6:40.
- LAC – Cameron Dicker 21-yard field goal, 6:52. Tied 3–3. Drive: 11 plays, 69 yards, 6:40.
- NE – Andrés Borregales 35-yard field goal, 0:02. Patriots 6–3. Drive: 5 plays, 37 yards, 0:29.

Third quarter

- NE – Andrés Borregales 39-yard field goal, 1:34. Patriots 9–3. Drive: 8 plays, 64 yards, 3:36.

Fourth quarter

- NE – Hunter Henry 28-yard pass from Drake Maye (Andrés Borregales kick), 9:45. Patriots 16–3. Drive: 7 plays, 80 yards, 4:16.

Top passers

- LAC – Justin Herbert – 19/31, 159 yards
- NE – Drake Maye – 17/29, 268 yards, TD, INT

Top rushers

- LAC – Justin Herbert – 10 rushes, 57 yards
- NE – Drake Maye – 10 rushes, 66 yards

Top receivers

- LAC – Ladd McConkey – 3 receptions, 32 yards
- NE – Rhamondre Stevenson – 3 receptions, 75 yards

This was the fifth playoff match-up between the Chargers and Patriots. The Patriots had won the last three meetings: a 24–21 victory in the 2006 AFC Divisional Round, a 21–12 victory in the 2007 AFC Championship Game and a 41–28 victory in the 2018 AFC Divisional Round. The then-named San Diego Chargers won the 1963 AFL Championship, the team's only championship to date. This was the Patriots' first home game since losing to the Tennessee Titans (coincidentally, who were coached by current Patriots coach Mike Vrabel) in the 2019 AFC Wild Card Game in Tom Brady's last game for the team. The Chargers and Patriots did not meet in the regular season.

The Chargers missed opportunities early in the game with two goal line chances in the first half, only to come away with three points. At halftime, New England held a 6–3 lead. The Patriots were putting together their best drive of the game in their first possession of the third quarter before Drake Maye was sacked by Odafe Oweh and fumbled on the Chargers' 18-yard line, which was recovered by Da'Shawn Hand. The Patriots later extended their lead to 9–3 on an Andrés Borregales field goal with 1:43 left in the third quarter. In the fourth quarter at 9:45, Maye threw a touchdown pass to former Charger Hunter Henry to extend their lead to 16–3. This would end up being the final score, as the Patriots picked up their first playoff win since Super Bowl LIII and improved to 4–0 in the Super Bowl era against the Chargers franchise.

=== Monday, January 12, 2026 ===
==== AFC: Houston Texans 30, Pittsburgh Steelers 6 ====
Houston Texans vs. Pittsburgh Steelers – Game summary

Quarter	1	2	3	4	Total
Texans	0	7	0	23	30
Steelers	3	3	0	0	6

at Acrisure Stadium, Pittsburgh, Pennsylvania

- Date: January 12, 2026
- Game time: 8:15 p.m. EST
- Game weather: Clear, 32 °F (0 °C)
- Game attendance: 67,297
- Referee: Craig Wrolstad
- TV announcers (ESPN/ABC): Joe Buck, Troy Aikman, Lisa Salters and Laura Rutledge
- Recap, Game Book

Game information

First quarter

- PIT – Chris Boswell 32-yard field goal, 6:02. Steelers 3–0. Drive: 7 plays, 58 yards, 2:52.

Second quarter

- HOU – Christian Kirk 6-yard pass from C. J. Stroud (Kaʻimi Fairbairn kick), 8:28. Texans 7–3. Drive: 14 plays, 92 yards, 7:01.
- PIT – Chris Boswell 36-yard field goal, 1:57. Texans 7–6. Drive: 8 plays, 4 yards, 4:17.

Third quarter

- No scoring plays

Fourth quarter

- HOU – Kaʻimi Fairbairn 51-yard field goal, 13:07. Texans 10–6. Drive: 7 plays, 45 yards, 3:22.
- HOU – Sheldon Rankins 33-yard fumble recovery (Kaʻimi Fairbairn kick), 11:23. Texans 17–6.
- HOU – Woody Marks 13-yard run (Kaʻimi Fairbairn kick), 3:38. Texans 24–6. Drive: 11 plays, 87 yards, 5:51.
- HOU – Calen Bullock 51-yard interception return (kick failed), 2:39. Texans 30–6.

Top passers

- HOU – C. J. Stroud – 21/32, 250 yards, TD, INT
- PIT – Aaron Rodgers – 17/33, 146 yards, INT

Top rushers

- HOU – Woody Marks – 19 rushes, 112 yards, TD
- PIT – Jaylen Warren – 12 rushes, 43 yards

Top receivers

- HOU – Christian Kirk – 8 receptions, 144 yards, TD
- PIT – DK Metcalf – 2 receptions, 42 yards

This was the first playoff matchup between these two teams. This was the first season in which the Texans qualified for the postseason as a wild card team, thus this was also their first playoff game in the Wild Card round on the road in their ninth appearance in the round. This was also the first time the Texans participated in a Wild Card game that was not in the Saturday afternoon slot. The two teams did not meet in the regular season.

This marked the first Steelers and Texans match-up since Week 4 of the 2023 regular season, a span of 834 days. With this lack of familiarity with each other, the Steelers and Texans started off the game by exchanging punts. The Steelers kicked a field goal to take a 3–0 lead, before C. J. Stroud fumbled on a flea flicker play that was blown up and recovered by rookie linebacker Jack Sawyer on the next possession. However, the Steelers were forced to punt as the first quarter ended. The Texans then drove 91 yards down the field and scored a touchdown on a short 6-yard pass from Stroud to Christian Kirk to give themselves a 7–3 lead, which was their second longest drive of the season. Stroud fumbled for the second time in the game with 6:14 left in the second quarter on Houston's own 23-yard line after failing to secure the snap cleanly from shotgun. The Texans' league-leading defense stepped up again, forcing the Steelers to another Chris Boswell field goal directly after the two-minute warning to make the score 7–6, which was the score heading into halftime. In the first drive of the second half, Stroud marched the Texans to the red zone before throwing behind Xavier Hutchinson and getting intercepted by Brandin Echols, for Stroud's third turnover of the game. However, after the interception, the Steelers were forced to punt. A Kaʻimi Fairbairn field goal extended the Texans lead to 10–6 at the start of the fourth quarter. On the next possession, Aaron Rodgers was strip-sacked by All-Pro Will Anderson and the fumble was recovered and returned for a 33-yard touchdown by fellow All-Pro Sheldon Rankins. After a Steelers punt, the Texans scored another offensive touchdown on a Woody Marks 2-yard run. The Texans defense put an exclamation mark on their effort for the game with a pick-six of Rodgers by Calen Bullock for a 50-yard touchdown.

The Texans won their first playoff road game of the franchise's 23-year history by the score of 30–6. The Texans out-gained the Steelers 408–175 on offense, and the Texans' defense out-scored the Steelers' offense 14–6. Rookie running back Woody Marks had 112 yards on the ground with 19 carries (his first game rushing for 100 yards or more) and Christian Kirk caught eight balls for 144 yards, with both players also scoring a touchdown. The Steelers have now lost seven straight postseason games while Mike Tomlin tied Marvin Lewis for most consecutive playoff losses for a head coach. Tomlin stepped down as Pittsburgh's head coach the next day after 19 seasons with the team.

== Divisional round ==
=== Saturday, January 17, 2026 ===
==== AFC: Denver Broncos 33, Buffalo Bills 30 (OT) ====
Buffalo Bills vs. Denver Broncos – Game summary

Quarter	1	2	3	4	OT	Total
Bills	7	3	7	13	0	30
Broncos	3	17	3	7	3	33

at Empower Field at Mile High, Denver, Colorado

- Date: January 17, 2026
- Game time: 2:30 p.m. MST/4:30 p.m. EST
- Game weather: Sunny, 36 °F (2 °C)
- Game attendance: 77,043
- Referee: Carl Cheffers
- TV announcers (CBS): Jim Nantz, Tony Romo and Tracy Wolfson
- Recap, Game Book

Game information

First quarter

- DEN – Wil Lutz 28-yard field goal, 7:29. Broncos 3–0. Drive: 14 plays, 64 yards, 7:31.
- BUF – Mecole Hardman 4-yard pass from Josh Allen (Matt Prater kick), 0:05. Bills 7–3. Drive: 12 plays, 67 yards, 7:24.

Second quarter

- DEN – Frank Crum 7-yard pass from Bo Nix (Wil Lutz kick), 9:33. Broncos 10–7. Drive: 8 plays, 69 yards, 3:47.
- BUF – Matt Prater 33-yard field goal, 2:13. Tied 10–10. Drive: 13 plays, 69 yards, 7:20.
- DEN – Lil'Jordan Humphrey 29-yard pass from Bo Nix (Wil Lutz kick), 0:22. Broncos 17–10. Drive: 11 plays, 70 yards, 1:51.
- DEN – Wil Lutz 50-yard field goal, 0:00. Broncos 20–10. Drive: 1 play, 0 yards, 0:02.

Third quarter

- DEN – Wil Lutz 33-yard field goal, 11:35. Broncos 23–10. Drive: 4 plays, 2 yards, 2:33.
- BUF – Keon Coleman 10-yard pass from Josh Allen (Matt Prater kick), 6:49. Broncos 23–17. Drive: 9 plays, 73 yards, 4:46.

Fourth quarter

- BUF – Dalton Kincaid 14-yard pass from Josh Allen (Matt Prater kick), 13:24. Bills 24–23. Drive: 9 plays, 85 yards, 4:06.
- BUF – Matt Prater 31-yard field goal, 4:11. Bills 27–23. Drive: 13 plays, 68 yards, 7:39.
- DEN – Marvin Mims 26-yard pass from Bo Nix (Wil Lutz kick), 0:55. Broncos 30–27. Drive: 8 plays, 73 yards, 3:16.
- BUF – Matt Prater 50-yard field goal, 0:05. Tied 30–30. Drive: 8 plays, 41 yards, 0:50.

Overtime

- DEN – Wil Lutz 24-yard field goal, 4:44. Broncos 33–30. Drive: 6 plays, 75 yards, 3:02.

Top passers

- BUF – Josh Allen – 25/39, 283 yards, 3 TD, 2 INT
- DEN – Bo Nix – 26/46, 279 yards, 3 TD, INT

Top rushers

- BUF – James Cook – 24 rushes, 117 yards
- DEN – Bo Nix – 12 rushes, 29 yards

Top receivers

- BUF – Dalton Kincaid – 6 receptions, 83 yards, TD
- DEN – Marvin Mims – 8 receptions, 93 yards, TD

This was a rematch of the previous year's AFC Wild Card Game, which Buffalo won 31–7, and the third overall postseason match-up between two teams. The other playoff meeting occurred in the 1991 AFC Championship, when the Bills beat the Broncos 10–7 in Buffalo to reach their second of four consecutive Super Bowls. This was Denver's first home playoff game since defeating the New England Patriots in the AFC Championship Game, 20–18, to get to and win Super Bowl 50. The Bills and Broncos did not play each other in the regular season.

Back-up running back Jaleel McLaughlin fumbled in the red zone on the Broncos' opening drive, but Bills' defensive tackle Larry Ogunjobi was offsides, negating the Bills recovery. The next play, Lil'Jordan Humphrey dropped a pass from Bo Nix that would have given the Broncos the touchdown; instead, they ended up settling for a Wil Lutz 28-yard field goal. On the Bills' first drive, Josh Allen led the team down the field on a 12-play, 67-yard drive that was capped on a Mecole Hardman 4-yard touchdown pass from Allen, in a play was of reminisce of Hardman's Super Bowl LVIII game-winning catch in overtime for the Chiefs. In the second quarter with 13:20 left in the half, the Bills' 2nd team All-Pro running back James Cook fumbled for the seventh time this season on Denver's 32-yard line. On the subsequent possession, offensive tackle Frank Crum caught a 7-yard pass from Nix for a touchdown to take a 10–7 lead. Cook gained 39 of the team's 69 yards on the Bills' next possession that ended on a Matt Prater field goal to tie the score with 2:13 left in the second quarter. Nix connected with Humphrey for 29 yards to score a touchdown and put the Broncos up 17–10 with 22 seconds left until halftime. Instead of kneeling and going into the half, the Bills ran a play, in which Allen scrambled for 12 yards but fumbled trying to lateral to a teammate on his own 30-yard line with just 3 seconds left. Lutz then kicked the 50-yard field goal, giving the Broncos the two score lead at halftime, 20–10. This was the first time since 1993 that a team in the playoffs scored ten points in the final 30 seconds of a half.

On the second play of the third quarter, Allen was hit on his blindside for a sack by Nik Bonitto and fumbled on Buffalo's own 25-yard line. The Broncos went three-and-out after the fumble, but Lutz kicked a 33-yard field goal to further their lead to 13. The Bills responded from the stop by their defense with a 73-yard drive, which was concluded with an Allen screen pass to Keon Coleman to cut Denver's lead to 6. The Bills and Broncos both exchanged interceptions on their next possessions. Rookie defensive tackle Deone Walker interception of Nix was followed by Allen throwing a pick on a pass intended for Curtis Samuel by safety P. J. Locke, who returned the interception for 30 yards. It was the third and fourth turnovers of the last 10:03 of game play and Allen's third of the game. The Broncos could not get anything going after Locke's interception and punted the ball back to the Bills.

Dalton Kincaid, running a fade route, caught a 14-yard touchdown from Allen to put the Bills in front, 24–23, with the game now in the opening minutes of the fourth quarter; earlier in the possession, Khalil Shakir had a 46-yard catch and run. Another three-and-out for the Broncos offense gave the Bills back the ball and they proceeded to go 68 yards on 11 plays before the drive stalled after Allen short-hopped a screen pass to Shakir on 3rd-and-8 from Denver's 12-yard line. The next play, Prater extended the Bills lead to 27–23 with 4:11 left in the game. Nix went 6-of-7 on a 73-yard, 8-play drive on the Broncos' next possession. On the sixth completion, Nix launched a pass up the left sideline to Marvin Mims for a 29-yard touchdown. This put the Broncos up 30–27 with 55 seconds remaining. Allen led the Bills down the field and got into Matt Prater's field goal range, although he did overthrow Dawson Knox on a long pass-play that could have gave Buffalo the game-winning touchdown. Prater successfully made the 50-yard field goal with 5 seconds remaining to tie the score at 30. This sent the game into overtime for the first time in the playoffs since Super Bowl LVIII.

In the first playoff overtime game in Denver since the Mile High Miracle and the first for the Bills since the 13 Seconds Game, the Bills won the toss and elected to kick-off. The Broncos drive fizzled out at their own 38-yard line. A 55-yard punt from Jeremy Crawshaw put the ball on Buffalo's 7-yard line. The Bills moved the ball, but a long Josh Allen pass to Brandin Cooks was intercepted by Ja'Quan McMillian. On the play, Cooks had the ball in his hands, but McMillian wrestled it away from Cooks and into his arms as both men rolled to the ground. Although the play was close to being a Cooks catch, it was reviewed and still ruled an interception because Cooks "did not survive the ground with clear possession of the ball", according to referee Carl Cheffers; in turn, this put the ball at Denver's own 20-yard line after the pick. A 24-yard RJ Harvey catch-and-run and two pass interferences (the first by Taron Johnson on Courtland Sutton for 17 yards, the second by Tre'Davious White on Mims for 30 yards, which were both considered controversial with how the game was called until that point), set up Wil Lutz to kick a 23-yard field goal and give Denver their first playoff win since Super Bowl 50.

After the game, it was revealed that Nix broke a bone in his ankle and would miss the rest of the postseason. It was also announced that Jarrett Stidham would start in the AFC Championship game.

On January 19, it was announced that head coach Sean McDermott was fired from the Bills.

This game reached an average of approximately 39.6 million viewers, with a peak of approximately 51.3 million during overtime. It became the most-watched Saturday sports telecast since the 1994 Winter Olympics, and also became the most-watched Saturday afternoon telecast in American television history.

==== NFC: Seattle Seahawks 41, San Francisco 49ers 6 ====
San Francisco 49ers vs. Seattle Seahawks – Game summary

Quarter	1	2	3	4	Total
49ers	0	6	0	0	6
Seahawks	17	7	10	7	41

at Lumen Field, Seattle, Washington

- Date: January 17, 2026
- Game time: 5:20 p.m. PST/8:20 p.m. EST
- Game weather: Clear, 46 °F (8 °C)
- Game attendance: 68,579
- Referee: John Hussey
- TV announcers (Fox): Kevin Burkhardt, Tom Brady, Erin Andrews and Tom Rinaldi
- Recap, Game Book

Game information

First quarter

- SEA – Rashid Shaheed 95-yard kickoff return (Jason Myers kick), 14:47. Seahawks 7–0.
- SEA – Jason Myers 31-yard field goal, 5:06. Seahawks 10–0. Drive: 11 plays, 44 yards, 6:10.
- SEA – Jaxon Smith-Njigba 4-yard pass from Sam Darnold (Jason Myers kick), 1:50. Seahawks 17–0. Drive: 5 plays, 42 yards, 2:27.

Second quarter

- SF – Eddy Pineiro 40-yard field goal, 11:58. Seahawks 17–3. Drive: 10 plays, 43 yards, 4:52.
- SF – Eddy Pineiro 56-yard field goal, 4:32. Seahawks 17–6. Drive: 10 plays, 57 yards, 5:40.
- SEA – Kenneth Walker III 7-yard run (Jason Myers kick), 0:31. Seahawks 24–6. Drive: 10 plays, 80 yards, 4:01.

Third quarter

- SEA – Jason Myers 24-yard field goal, 7:07. Seahawks 27–6. Drive: 8 plays, 36 yards, 4:59.
- SEA – Kenneth Walker III 15-yard run (Jason Myers kick), 2:23. Seahawks 34–6. Drive: 6 plays, 47 yards, 3:46.

Fourth quarter

- SEA – Kenneth Walker III 6-yard run (Jason Myers kick), 12:43. Seahawks 41–6. Drive: 5 plays, 37 yards, 2:58.

Top passers

- SF – Brock Purdy – 15/27, 140 yards, INT
- SEA – Sam Darnold – 12/17, 124 yards, TD

Top rushers

- SF – Brock Purdy – 5 rushes, 37 yards
- SEA – Kenneth Walker III – 19 rushes, 116 yards, 3 TD

Top receivers

- SF – Jake Tonges – 5 receptions, 59 yards
- SEA – Cooper Kupp – 5 receptions, 60 yards

This was the third playoff match-up between the two NFC West rivals, with both teams splitting the prior games. The 49ers had won the 2022 NFC Wild Card Game, while the Seahawks had won the 2013 NFC Championship Game, a game referred to in Seattle as "The Tip". The 49ers and Seahawks played each other two weeks prior in Week 18 with the NFC West division title and the #1 seed in the NFC on the line; the Seahawks won that game, 13–3, at Levi's Stadium. Their other regular-season match-up was won by the 49ers in Week 1, by a score of 17–13 at Lumen Field. Quarterback Sam Darnold entered this playoff game as questionable after injuring his oblique muscle in practice on Thursday.

Mid-season trade pickup Rashid Shaheed returned the opening kickoff for an immediate Seahawks touchdown. This was the sixth kickoff return touchdown to open a playoff game in NFL history and the first since Knile Davis returned one for the Chiefs in the 2015 AFC Wild Card vs Houston. After a 49ers turnover on downs, Jason Myers connected on a 31-yard field goal to give the Seahawks a 10–0 lead. Ernest Jones IV forced a fumble from Jake Tonges to regain possession for Seattle. Jaxon Smith-Njigba then caught a touchdown to extend Seattle's lead to 17–0. Eddy Piñeiro kicked a 40-yard field goal to cut the Seahawks lead to 17–3 early in the second quarter. The Seahawks went three and out, but were able to pin San Francisco at their own four-yard line off the punt. The 49ers drove 57 yards on their next drive, but were forced to settle for a 56-yard field goal to further trim Seattle's lead to 17–6. However, the Seahawks responded with a touchdown from Kenneth Walker III to extend their lead to 24–6 with 36 seconds remaining in the half, which was the score entering halftime. After a Seahawks field goal, a Kenneth Walker rushing touchdown gave the Seahawks a commanding 34–6 lead. Early in the fourth quarter, Walker scored for the third time on a 6-yard rushing touchdown to increase the Seahawks lead to 41–6. Each team's back-ups played out the clock the rest of the fourth quarter, as the Seahawks reached their first NFC Championship Game since 2014. This was the 49ers' first playoff defeat before an NFC Conference Championship Game or Super Bowl since 2002, a span of seven consecutive playoff appearances; it was also their second most lopsided loss in the playoffs.

=== Sunday, January 18, 2026 ===
==== AFC: New England Patriots 28, Houston Texans 16 ====
Houston Texans vs. New England Patriots – Game summary

Quarter	1	2	3	4	Total
Texans	3	7	6	0	16
Patriots	7	14	0	7	28

at Gillette Stadium, Foxborough, Massachusetts

- Date: January 18, 2026
- Game time: 3:00 p.m. EST
- Game weather: Snow, 35 °F (2 °C)
- Game attendance: 64,628
- Referee: Shawn Smith
- TV announcers (ESPN/ABC): Joe Buck, Troy Aikman, Lisa Salters and Laura Rutledge
- Recap, Game Book

Game information

First quarter

- NE – Demario Douglas 28-yard pass from Drake Maye (Andrés Borregales kick), 9:35. Patriots 7–0. Drive: 6 plays, 66 yards, 3:18.
- HOU – Ka'imi Fairbairn 25-yard field goal, 5:26. Patriots 7–3. Drive: 10 plays, 65 yards, 4:09.

Second quarter

- HOU – Christian Kirk 10-yard pass from C. J. Stroud (Ka'imi Fairbairn kick), 12:51. Texans 10–7. Drive: 6 plays, 27 yards, 3:02.
- NE – Marcus Jones 26-yard interception return (Andrés Borregales kick), 10:31. Patriots 14–10.
- NE – Stefon Diggs 7-yard pass from Drake Maye (Andrés Borregales kick), 3:12. Patriots 21–10. Drive: 5 plays, 56 yards, 2:48.

Third quarter

- HOU – Ka'imi Fairbairn 25-yard field goal, 9:45. Patriots 21–13. Drive: 11 plays, 58 yards, 5:15.
- HOU – Ka'imi Fairbairn 51-yard field goal, 1:32. Patriots 21–16. Drive: 6 plays, 26 yards, 1:56.

Fourth quarter

- NE – Kayshon Boutte 32-yard pass from Drake Maye (Andrés Borregales kick), 12:58. Patriots 28–16. Drive: 6 plays, 71 yards, 3:34.

Top passers

- HOU – C. J. Stroud – 20/47, 212 yards, TD, 4 INT
- NE – Drake Maye – 16/27, 179 yards, 3 TD, INT

Top rushers

- HOU – Woody Marks – 14 rushes, 17 yards
- NE – Rhamondre Stevenson – 16 rushes, 70 yards

Top receivers

- HOU – Jayden Higgins – 6 receptions, 59 yards
- NE – Kayshon Boutte – 3 receptions, 75 yards, TD

This was the third playoff match-up between these teams; New England defeated Houston in Foxborough in the 2012 and 2016 divisional rounds. The Patriots and Texans did not play each other in the regular season.

Both teams started off with punts. The Patriots scored a touchdown on their second possession via a Drake Maye pass to DeMario Douglas for 28 yards. The Texans responded by kicking a field goal by Ka'imi Fairbairn to cut the lead to 7–3. That remained the score after the first quarter after a Patriots punt, a Carlton Davis interception off C. J. Stroud and Drake Maye fumbling. Christian Kirk scored a touchdown to give Houston a 10–7 lead, but after a Patriots punt, Marcus Jones got a pick-6 to give New England a 14–10 lead. Stroud immediately threw his third interception of the game to Craig Woodson, but the Texans defense forced another punt. After the Patriots forced a punt, Stefon Diggs scored a 7-yard rushing touchdown to give New England a 21–10 lead. Carlton Davis picked off Stroud just after the two minute warning for his fourth pick of the game. The Patriots were unable to score and after the two teams traded punts, a Hail Mary attempt by Drake Maye was intercepted in the end zone by Ja'Marcus Ingram, ending the half with the score at 21–10.

After a Marcus Jones pass deflection on a 3rd-and-2 from New England's 7-yard line, the Texans kicked a field goal on the opening drive of the third quarter to cut New England's lead to 21–13. Following this, Will Anderson Jr. strip sacked Drake Maye to regain possession for Houston. However, the Patriots defense responded when Christian Gonzalez forced a fumble off Woody Marks five plays into Houston's drive. The Patriots proceeded to go three-and-out and punt the ball back to Houston afterwards. The Texans then kicked a field goal to cut the lead to 21–16. However, as the fourth quarter began, the Patriots scored a touchdown when Maye dotted a 32-yard pass to Kayshon Boutte, who caught the ball with one hand, up the right sideline on their next possession to extend their lead to 28–16. The Patriots defense were able to make the necessary stops the rest of the game to improve to 3–0 versus the Texans franchise in the playoffs and advance to their first AFC Championship Game since 2018.

The Texans offense struggled mightily without tackle Trent Brown, wide receiver Nico Collins and tight end Dalton Schultz (who injured his calf during the game). Their offense had five turnovers on the game, including four interceptions from Stroud. Running back Woody Marks, who had a career-high 112 yards rushing last week, had just 17 yards on 14 carries, while Stroud finished with a passer rating of 28, which was tied with former Ram Deiter Brock as the 29th worst in playoff history. The Patriots offense only seven more yards and their defense scored the only points after a Texans turnover; however, Drake Maye played a far more efficient game than Stroud, throwing three touchdown passes and one interception (on a end-of-half Hail Mary attempt) on 27 attempts (he also lost two fumbles). The Patriots' defense five turnovers was the most for New England in a playoff game since the 2003 AFC Championship Game.

This game became the most-watched game on ESPN and ABC, with an average of 38 million viewers across both networks. It became the most-watched event in ESPN history, dating back to the network's launch in 1979, and back to their official NFL debut in 1987. It also became Disney's most-watched sporting event outside of Super Bowls since the 2006 Rose Bowl on their ABC Sports division at the time.

==== NFC: Los Angeles Rams 20, Chicago Bears 17 (OT) ====
Los Angeles Rams vs. Chicago Bears – Game summary

Quarter	1	2	3	4	OT	Total
Rams	7	3	0	7	3	20
Bears	0	10	0	7	0	17

at Soldier Field, Chicago, Illinois

- Date: January 18, 2026
- Game time: 5:30 p.m. CST/6:30 p.m. EST
- Game weather: Snow, 19 °F (−7 °C)
- Game attendance: 60,253
- Referee: Shawn Hochuli
- TV announcers (NBC): Mike Tirico, Cris Collinsworth, Melissa Stark and Kaylee Hartung
- Recap, Game Book

Game information

First quarter

- LAR – Kyren Williams 4-yard run (Harrison Mevis kick), 6:20. Rams 7–0. Drive: 14 plays, 85 yards, 6:33.

Second quarter

- CHI – D. J. Moore 3-yard pass from Caleb Williams (Cairo Santos kick), 14:55. Tied 7–7. Drive: 12 plays, 80 yards, 6:25.
- CHI – Cairo Santos 48-yard field goal, 1:10. Bears 10–7. Drive: 5 plays, 33 yards, 1:44.
- LAR – Harrison Mevis 32-yard field goal, 0:00. Tied 10–10. Drive: 8 plays, 66 yards, 1:10.

Third quarter

- No scoring plays

Fourth quarter

- LAR – Kyren Williams 5-yard run (Harrison Mevis kick), 8:50. Rams 17–10. Drive: 14 plays, 91 yards, 6:02.
- CHI – Cole Kmet 14-yard pass from Caleb Williams (Cairo Santos kick), 0:18. Tied 17–17. Drive: 7 plays, 50 yards, 1:32.

Overtime

- LAR – Harrison Mevis 42-yard field goal, 3:19. Rams 20–17. Drive: 10 plays, 54 yards, 3:20.

Top passers

- LAR – Matthew Stafford – 20/42, 258 yards
- CHI – Caleb Williams – 23/42, 257 yards, 2 TD, 3 INT

Top rushers

- LAR – Kyren Williams – 21 rushes, 87 yards, 2 TD
- CHI – D'Andre Swift – 19 rushes, 76 yards

Top receivers

- LAR – Colby Parkinson – 3 receptions, 56 yards
- CHI – Colston Loveland – 4 receptions, 56 yards

This was the third playoff meeting between Chicago and Los Angeles. The Rams won the 1950 Conference playoff at the Los Angeles Memorial Coliseum. The Bears shut out the Rams at Soldier Field, 24–0, to win the 1985 NFC Championship Game before winning Super Bowl XX. The Bears and Rams did not play each other in the regular season.

The game began with Caleb Williams throwing an interception to cornerback Cobie Durant deep in Rams territory on the opening possession. The Rams then marched 85 yards down the field on 14 plays to take a 7–0 lead on a 4-yard goal-line run by Kyren Williams. The Bears responded with an 80-yard drive and a Williams to D. J. Moore 3-yard touchdown on 4th-and-goal to tie the game 7–7, which was the first play of the second quarter. After a pair of unsuccessful drives from both teams, the Bears took a 10–7 lead with a 48-yard field goal off the leg of Cairo Santos. The Rams responded with a successful field goal by Harrison Mevis to tie the game at 10 heading into halftime.

The second half started with three consecutive punts. Williams threw his second interception to Durant with 4:10 left in the third quarter. Neither team scored in the quarter, as both teams combined for just 86 yards of offense. The Rams more than doubled their third quarter total in their first drive of the fourth, going 91 yards and scoring on Kyren Williams' second rushing touchdown of the game to break the tie and go up 17–10. Facing a 4th-and-goal with 3:06 left in the game, the Rams defense got a stop to prevent the tie. However, the Rams could not put the game away, failing to pick up a second first down on the drive. With a little over a minute left, Rams punter Ethan Evans proceeded to only punt the ball for 33 yards, which meant the Bears only had 50 yards to go to tie the game. The Bears drive stalled at Los Angeles' 14-yard line. On 4th-and-4, Caleb Williams, retreating to the Los Angeles' 40-yard line trying to avoid a Rams all-out blitz, connected with Cole Kmet to tie the game at 17–17 with 27 seconds left and force overtime. The play was a pseudo Hail Mary as the ball traveled 51.2 yards in the air before Kmet came down with the touchdown in front of Durant.

With momentum on their side, the Bears forced a three and out to start overtime. However, Williams proceeded to throw his third interception after it appeared D. J. Moore gave up on a post route, this time to Kamren Curl. The Rams then drove into Chicago territory. Harrison Mevis kicked a walk-off 42-yard field goal to win the game and send the Rams to their third NFC Championship Game since moving back to Los Angeles in 2016.

Following the game, the NBC broadcast was criticized for not showing the handshake between Ben Johnson and Sean McVay.

== Conference championships ==
Per an annual rotation used by the NFL since 1997 and made official in 2002, the AFC Championship Game was the first game played (at 3:00 p.m. EST); this was followed by the NFC Championship Game (at 6:30 p.m. EST).

=== Sunday, January 25, 2026 ===
==== AFC: New England Patriots 10, Denver Broncos 7 ====
New England Patriots vs. Denver Broncos – Game summary

Quarter	1	2	3	4	Total
Patriots	0	7	3	0	10
Broncos	7	0	0	0	7

at Empower Field at Mile High, Denver, Colorado

- Date: January 25, 2026
- Game time: 1:00 p.m. MST/3:00 p.m. EST
- Game weather: Cloudy in the first half turning to heavy snow in the second half , 26 °F (−3 °C)
- Game attendance: 76,862
- Referee: Alex Kemp
- TV announcers (CBS): Jim Nantz, Tony Romo, Tracy Wolfson and Evan Washburn
- Recap, Game Book

Game information

First quarter

- DEN – Courtland Sutton 6-yard pass from Jarrett Stidham (Wil Lutz kick), 10:19. Broncos 7–0. Drive: 5 plays, 59 yards, 1:41.

Second quarter

- NE – Drake Maye 6-yard run (Andres Borregales kick), 2:10. Tied 7–7. Drive: 2 plays, 12 yards, 0:42.

Third quarter

- NE – Andres Borregales 23-yard field goal, 5:29. Patriots 10–7. Drive: 16 plays, 64 yards, 9:31.

Fourth quarter

- No scoring plays

Top passers

- NE – Drake Maye – 10/21, 86 yards
- DEN – Jarrett Stidham – 17/31, 133 yards, TD, INT

Top rushers

- NE – Rhamondre Stevenson – 25 rushes, 71 yards
- DEN – RJ Harvey – 13 rushes, 37 yards

Top receivers

- NE – Mack Hollins – 2 receptions, 51 yards
- DEN – Marvin Mims – 4 receptions, 62 yards

This was the sixth playoff match-up between the Broncos and Patriots, with the most recent meeting happening nearly 10 years ago to the day when the Broncos defeated the Patriots in the AFC Championship Game, 20–18, to advance to Super Bowl 50. Denver held a perfect 4–0 record against New England in playoff games played in Denver. Denver and New England had not played each other since the 2023 regular season. This was the first AFC Championship Game since 2017 not to feature the Kansas City Chiefs, and the first since 2010 to involve neither Tom Brady nor Patrick Mahomes. The Patriots tied the Pittsburgh Steelers for the league lead in AFC Championship Game appearances with 16 and the Broncos made their 11th appearance. With Broncos quarterback Bo Nix sidelined, the Patriots entered the game as the largest road favorite in the history of the AFC title game.

The first two drives of the game for both teams combined for just 7 yards. On Denver’s second drive, Jarrett Stidham connected with Marvin Mims for a 52-yard pass, which set up a Courtland Sutton 6-yard touchdown from Stidham two plays later. An 11-play Broncos drive at the start of the second quarter was stopped when their offense failed on a 4th-and-1 on New England’s 14-yard line; afterwards, Broncos head coach Sean Payton stated he regretted not kicking the field goal to go up ten. With 2:58 left in the half, Stidham attempted to throw the ball away after a Patriots' blitz, but Stidham's pass attempt was overturned by the referees and ruled a backwards pass, which was recovered by the Patriots at Denver's 12-yard line. Two plays later, Drake Maye ran it in for a rushing touchdown to tie the score at seven. Neither team would score the rest of the half.

As snow started to fall, the Patriots held the ball for 9:31 on a 16-play opening drive of the third quarter, but could only come away with a Andrés Borregales 23-yard field goal to go up 10–7. With 11 seconds left in the third quarter, and the snow starting to fall more aggressively, Borregales missed a 46-yard field goal. At 4:42 left in the fourth quarter, and the field now fully covered in snow, Leonard Taylor slightly tipped a Wil Lutz 42-yard field attempt to prevent a tie. Stidham threw an interception to Christian Gonzalez on the second play of the Broncos' next drive with 2:17 left in the game. The Patriots iced the game when Maye ran for seven yards after a play action fake for a first down to give New England their first playoff win in Denver.

Since 2001, the Chiefs and Patriots have accounted for 15 of 25 AFC Super Bowl appearances this century. The Patriots also extended their NFL-leading Super Bowl appearance to 12, four more than any other team.

==== NFC: Seattle Seahawks 31, Los Angeles Rams 27 ====
Los Angeles Rams vs. Seattle Seahawks – Game summary

Quarter	1	2	3	4	Total
Rams	3	10	14	0	27
Seahawks	10	7	14	0	31

at Lumen Field, Seattle, Washington

- Date: January 25, 2026
- Game time: 3:30 p.m. PST/6:30 p.m. EST
- Game weather: Sunny, 41 °F (5 °C)
- Game attendance: 68,773
- Referee: Clay Martin
- TV announcers (Fox): Kevin Burkhardt, Tom Brady, Erin Andrews and Tom Rinaldi
- Recap, Game Book

Game information

First quarter

- SEA – Kenneth Walker III 2-yard run (Jason Myers kick), 9:50. Seahawks 7–0. Drive: 7 plays, 81 yards, 3:36.
- LAR – Harrison Mevis 44-yard field goal, 8:50. Seahawks 7–3.Drive: 6 plays, 47 yards, 1:42.
- SEA – Jason Myers 27-yard field goal, 0:54. Seahawks 10–3.Drive: 12 plays, 56 yards, 7:21.

Second quarter

- LAR – Harrison Mevis 50-yard field goal, 12:21. Seahawks 10–6. Drive: 8 plays, 33 yards, 3:43.
- LAR – Kyren Williams 9–yard pass from Matthew Stafford (Harris Mevis kick), 1:55. Rams 13–10. Drive: 12 plays, 87 yards, 7:23.
- SEA – Jaxon Smith-Njigba 14-yard pass from Sam Darnold (Jason Myers kick), 0:20. Seahawks 17–13. Drive: 5 plays, 74 yards, 0:34.

Third quarter

- SEA – Jake Bobo 17-yard pass from Sam Darnold (Jason Myers kick), 12:02. Seahawks 24–13. Drive: 1 play, 17 yards, 0:05.
- LAR – Davante Adams 2-yard pass from Matthew Stafford (Harrison Mevis kick), 9:41. Seahawks 24–20. Drive: 4 plays, 75 yards, 2:21.
- SEA – Cooper Kupp 13-yard pass from Sam Darnold (Jason Myers kick), 4:52. Seahawks 31–20. Drive: 9 plays, 65 yards, 4:49.
- LAR – Puka Nacua 34-yard pass from Matthew Stafford (Harrison Mevis kick), 2:06. Seahawks 31–27. Drive: 5 plays, 87 yards, 2:46.

Fourth quarter

- No scoring plays

Top passers

- LAR – Matthew Stafford – 22/35, 374 yards, 3 TD
- SEA – Sam Darnold – 25/36, 346 yards, 3 TD

Top rushers

- LAR – Blake Corum – 9 rushes, 55 yards
- SEA – Kenneth Walker III – 19 rushes, 62 yards, TD

Top receivers

- LAR – Puka Nacua – 9 receptions, 165 yards, TD
- SEA – Jaxon Smith-Njigba – 10 receptions, 153 yards, TD

The Rams and Seahawks have met twice in the NFL playoffs, with the Rams winning both Wild Card matchups: 27–20 in the 2004 playoffs and 30–20 in the 2020 playoffs, both of which are Seattle's only two home losses in the playoffs since moving to the NFC in 2002. The NFC West rivals split both their meetings against each other in the regular season. The Rams won in Week 11, 21–19, at SoFi Stadium, while the Seahawks won a pivotal Week 16 game, 38–37, in overtime at Lumen Field. Their Week 16 game was considered one of the best games of the season. In addition, just one yard and one point separated the two teams this season in their two meetings. The Rams made their 12th NFC Championship Game, and third since moving back to Los Angeles in 2016. This was the Seahawks' fourth appearance in the round. (Note: The Seahawks were members of the NFC in 1976 and then members of the AFC from 1977 to 2001, before rejoining the NFC in 2002. Including their only appearance (1983) in the AFC Championship Game (0–1), they hold a combined 3–1 record between both Conference Championship Games.)

In the first playoff matchup between the #1 scoring offense (Rams) and #1 scoring defense (Seahawks) since the 2014 NFC Championship Game, the Rams started the game with the ball and went three-and-out. The Seahawks quickly scored a touchdown on a 7-play drive that took just 3:36 on a Kenneth Walker III 2-yard goal-line run. Over their next possessions, the Rams and Seahawks traded field goals to put the score at 10–3 at the end of the first quarter. Three minutes into the second quarter, Rams kicker Harrison Mevis kicked a 50-yard field goal to cut the Seahawks’ lead to four. The Rams then took a 13–10 lead on a 12-play, 87-yard, 7:35 drive on a Kyren Williams 9-yard pass from Matthew Stafford. Jaxon Smith-Njigba starred on the Seahawks’ final possession of the half, catching a 42-yard pass and 14-yard touchdown, to go back up 17–13.

The Seahawks' opening drive of the third quarter stalled after a holding penalty, but Rams punt returner Xavier Smith muffed the punt on Los Angeles' 17-yard line, which was recovered by Seattle. On the next play, Sam Darnold threw a 17-yard pass to Jake Bobo to go up 24–13. Stafford led the Rams down the field on just four plays, scoring a touchdown on a 4-yard pass to Davante Adams. It was Adams' tenth touchdown inside the 5-yard line this season. Former Ram Cooper Kupp caught a red zone pass from Darnold and ran it into the end zone for 13 yards on Seattle’s next possession to extend their lead to 11. Cornerback Riq Woolen, who dropped a potential interception earlier in the drive, was called for a 15-yard taunting penalty, which kept a Rams drive that had stalled alive; on the ensuing play after the penalty, Puka Nacua shook Woolen to get open on a deep route and caught a 34-yard touchdown to cut into Seattle’s lead, 31–27, with 2:46 left in the third quarter. On the sidelines after the drive, Woolen and a few of his defensive teammates were seen arguing. The Seahawks defense stepped up in the red zone on the Rams next drive by stopping them from scoring on a 7:24, 14-play drive, with the game now deep into the fourth quarter. On their final offensive drive, the Seahawks picked up multiple key first downs to force the Rams to use all of their timeouts. They still punted the ball back to the Rams with 31 seconds left, but Nacua could not get out of bounds on what turned out to be the last play of the game and the clock ran out.

The Rams' weakness all season proved to be special teams and this was not rectified in time for the playoffs, which was exemplified when Smith muffed the punt at the start of the third quarter. Darnold and Stafford both played at high levels. Darnold had three touchdown passes, 346 yards, and key throws to burn significant clock on the Seahawks’ last drive, while Stafford finished with 374 yards and three touchdowns of his own. Njigba caught 10 passes for 153 yards, scoring a touchdown just before the half. Nacua essentially matched him with 9 catches for 163 yards and a touchdown. Adams, on the losing end of his fifth NFC Championship Game, caught 4 catches for 89 yards and a touchdown. Walker scored his fourth rushing touchdown of the playoffs and had 111 all-purpose yards. The Seahawks returned to the Super Bowl for the first time since 2015, which was also against the Patriots.

== Super Bowl LX: Seattle Seahawks 29, New England Patriots 13 ==
Super Bowl LX – Seattle Seahawks vs New England Patriots – Game summary

Quarter	1	2	3	4	Total
Seahawks	3	6	3	17	29
Patriots	0	0	0	13	13

at Levi's Stadium, Santa Clara, California

- Date: February 8, 2026
- Game time: 3:30 p.m. PST/6:30 p.m. EST
- Game weather: Fair, 67 °F (19 °C)
- Game attendance: 70,823
- Referee: Shawn Smith
- TV announcers (NBC): Mike Tirico, Cris Collinsworth, Melissa Stark and Kaylee Hartung
- Recap, Game Book

Game information

First quarter

- SEA – Jason Myers 33-yard field goal, 11:58. Seahawks 3–0. Drive: 8 plays, 51 yards, 3:02.

Second quarter

- SEA – Jason Myers 39-yard field goal, 11:16. Seahawks 6–0. Drive: 8 plays, 55 yards, 2:54.
- SEA – Jason Myers 41-yard field goal, 0:11. Seahawks 9–0. Drive: 9 plays, 34 yards, 2:39.

Third quarter

- SEA – Jason Myers 41-yard field goal, 9:12. Seahawks 12–0. Drive: 10 plays, 69 yards, 4:50.

Fourth quarter

- SEA – AJ Barner 16-yard pass from Sam Darnold (Jason Myers kick), 13:24. Seahawks 19–0. Drive: 5 plays, 37 yards, 1:46.
- NE – Mack Hollins 35-yard pass from Drake Maye (Andres Borregales kick), 12:27. Seahawks 19–7. Drive: 3 plays, 65 yards, 0:57.
- SEA – Jason Myers 26-yard field goal, 5:35. Seahawks 22–7. Drive: 6 plays, 30 yards, 3:02.
- SEA – Uchenna Nwosu 44-yard interception return (Jason Myers kick), 4:27. Seahawks 29–7.
- NE – Rhamondre Stevenson 7-yard pass from Drake Maye (pass failed), 2:21. Seahawks 29–13. Drive: 8 plays, 65 yards, 2:06.

Top passers

- SEA – Sam Darnold – 19/38, 202 yards, TD
- NE – Drake Maye – 27/43, 295 yards, 2 TD, 2 INT

Top rushers

- SEA – Kenneth Walker III – 27 rushes, 135 yards
- NE – Drake Maye – 5 rushes, 37 yards

Top receivers

- SEA – Cooper Kupp – 6 receptions, 61 yards
- NE – Mack Hollins – 4 receptions, 78 yards, TD

This was the New England Patriots and Seattle Seahawks' second Super Bowl against each other, following the Patriots' thrilling Super Bowl XLIX win over the Seahawks in 2014. In this match-up, Seattle dominated the game from the start, not allowing New England to score until the fourth quarter. The Seahawks defense tied the all-time Super Bowl record by recording seven sacks against Patriots quarterback Drake Maye, who also set a new record for most sacks taken in a single postseason. Seattle ultimately won the game 29–13, with running back Kenneth Walker III winning Super Bowl MVP. This was Seattle's second Super Bowl win in franchise history.

== Media coverage ==
Broadcasting rights of the Wild Card round was split between the NFL's existing broadcasters: CBS, Fox, NBC, ESPN and Amazon Prime Video. CBS had one game this season, which was an AFC contest which it is guaranteed annually, Fox aired two games, an NFC Wild Card game which is guaranteed annually, as well as a second game as part of a rotation with CBS and NBC since 2020. NBC's Wild Card game aired on Sunday night, while ESPN's Wild Card game aired on Monday night, with a simulcast on ABC and the Manningcast on ESPN2. This was the second season that Prime Video exclusively streamed a Wild Card game.

This was the third season that ESPN/ABC, Fox, CBS and NBC each aired one divisional playoff game.

CBS and Fox had the rights to the AFC Championship Game and NFC Championship Game, respectively.

NBC televised Super Bowl LX under the annual rotation of Super Bowl broadcasters.

ESPN Deportes, Fox Deportes, Telemundo and Universo aired all ESPN/ABC, Fox and NBC games in Spanish respectively.

Peacock, Paramount+, Fox One and the ESPN DTC service streamed all NBC, CBS, Fox and ESPN/ABC games, respectively, Amazon streamed its games in multiple feeds on Twitch on non-television devices. The league's streaming service NFL+ streamed every postseason game on mobile devices only, regardless of broadcaster.
