= Super Bowl LXIII =

2029 National Football League championship game

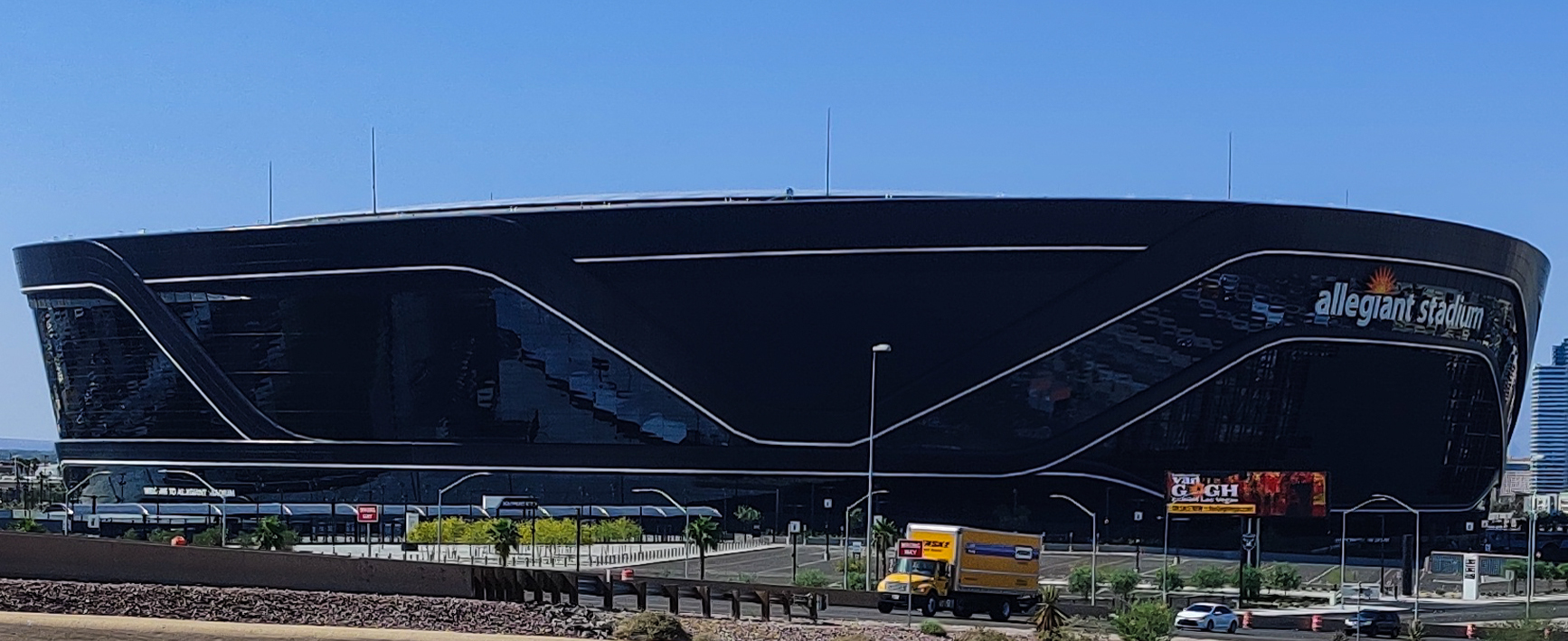
- Allegiant Stadium in 2021
- Date: February 11, 2029
- Stadium: Allegiant Stadium; Las Vegas, Nevada

TV in the United States
- Network: Television: Fox; Fox Deportes (Spanish); Streaming: Fox One; NFL+

Radio in the United States
- Network: Westwood One

Super Bowl LXIII is the upcoming American football championship game of the National Football League (NFL) for the 2028 season. The game is scheduled to be played on Sunday, February 11, 2029, at Allegiant Stadium in Las Vegas, Nevada.

This will be the second Super Bowl to be held in the state of Nevada, following Super Bowl LVIII held at the same venue exactly five years earlier. The game will be televised nationally by Fox.

== Background ==
=== Host selection ===
The league has made all decisions regarding hosting sites from Super Bowl LVII (held in February 2023) onward. There is no bidding process per site: the league selects a potential venue unilaterally, the chosen team puts together a hosting proposal, and then the league owners vote to determine whether it is acceptable. On March 30, 2026, the NFL announced that Super Bowl LXIII would be played at Allegiant Stadium in Paradise, Nevada, home of the Las Vegas Raiders. This will be the second Super Bowl to be held in the state of Nevada, following Super Bowl LVIII, which was won in overtime by the Kansas City Chiefs over the San Francisco 49ers.

== Broadcasting ==
=== United States ===
==== Television ====
Super Bowl LXIII will be televised nationally by Fox. It will be the sixth Super Bowl to be broadcast as part of the 11-year television contract, which allows a four-year rotation between CBS, Fox, NBC and ABC/ESPN.

==== Streaming ====
The game is planned to be streamed live on Fox One and Tubi, as well as NFL+ via mobile devices.

==== Radio ====
Westwood One is planned to hold the national radio rights to the game.

=== International ===
- In the United Kingdom and Ireland, the game will be televised on the free-to-air TBC.
- In Latin America, the game will be televised by TBC.
- In Germany and Austria, the game will be televised by TBC.
