= NFL on NBC Radio =

American sports radio program

From 1985–1986, the NBC Radio Network was the official, national radio provider for National Football League games. The program succeeded (and was itself, ultimately succeeded by) the CBS Radio Network's package.

== Background ==
On March 6, 1985, NBC Radio and the National Football League entered into a two-year agreement granting NBC the radio rights to a 37-game package in each of the 1985–1986 seasons. The package included 27 regular season games and 10 postseason games.

=== Prior to 1985 ===
NBC Radio, as early as 1934, had carried a handful of NFL games; it was particularly associated with carrying the Detroit Lions' annual Thanksgiving contests nationwide since their inception, helping to establish the Lions as a permanent part of the Thanksgiving tradition.

On April 5, 1961, NBC was awarded a two-year contract for radio and television rights to the NFL Championship Game for US$615,000 annually, $300,000 of which was to go directly into the NFL Player Benefit Plan.

From the 1966–1976 seasons, NBC Radio alternated with CBS Radio in coverage of the Super Bowl. After sharing coverage of Super Bowl I, NBC Radio would go on to broadcast only odd numbered Super Bowls. Jim Simpson served as the play-by-play man for all of NBC Radio's broadcasts (with the exceptions of Super Bowl III, which was called by Charlie Jones and Super Bowl V, which was called by Jay Randolph) during this era. Simpson, Jones and Randolph were joined on color commentary by George Ratterman (Super Bowls I and III), Pat Summerall (Super Bowl III), Al DeRogatis (Super Bowl V), Kyle Rote (Super Bowl VII), and John Brodie (Super Bowls IX and XI).

For their coverage of Super Bowl III at the end of the 1968 season, NBC used Pat Summerall (best known for his work for CBS and subsequently, Fox) to provide an "NFL prospective" on the coverage. This was due in part to the fact that NBC was at the time, the network television provider of the American Football League (whereas CBS was the network television provider for the pre-merger National Football League). In return, for CBS Radio's coverage of Super Bowls I, II and IV, they used Tom Hedrick, normally the radio voice of the Kansas City Chiefs, to provide an "AFL perspective" for their coverage.

== Ratings ==
In January 1986, NBC Radio figures indicated an audience of 10 million for their coverage Super Bowl XX between the Chicago Bears and New England Patriots.

In 1987, NBC Radio's broadcast of Super Bowl XXI between the New York Giants and Denver Broncos was heard by a record 10.1 million people.

== Announcers ==
=== Play-by-play ===
1. Don Criqui
2. Mel Proctor
3. Marty Glickman (1985)/Tom Davis (1986)

=== Color commentary ===
1. Bob Trumpy
2. Dave Rowe
3. Stan White

Bob Trumpy also hosted a national, postgame call-in show called NFL Live. NFL Live would officially become the name of the pregame show for the NFL on NBC television program.

As the lead broadcast team, Criqui and Trumpy were responsible for calling Monday Night Football and the Super Bowl. They performed these duties in tandem with their assignments on television; at the time Trumpy served as Criqui's analyst on Sunday afternoons.

=== Thanksgiving Day series ===
==== 1985 ====
1. Don Criqui/Bob Trumpy (Detroit vs. New York Jets)
2. Mel Proctor/Dave Rowe (Dallas vs. St. Louis Cardinals)

==== 1986 ====
1. Don Criqui/Bob Trumpy (Detroit vs. Green Bay)
2. Mel Proctor/Dave Rowe (Dallas vs. Seattle)

==== Playoffs ====
===== 1985–86 =====
====== Wild Card playoffs ======
1. Joe McConnell/Stan White (New England vs. New York Jets)
2. Don Criqui/Bob Trumpy (New York Giants vs. San Francisco)

====== Divisional playoffs ======
1. Marty Glickman/Stan White (Miami vs. Cleveland)
2. Mel Proctor/Dave Rowe (Los Angeles Rams vs. Dallas)
3. Don Criqui/Bob Trumpy (Chicago vs. New York Giants)
4. Mel Proctor/Dave Rowe (New England vs. Los Angeles Raiders)

====== Conference Championships ======
1. Mel Proctor/Dave Rowe (Chicago vs. Los Angeles Rams)
2. Don Criqui/Bob Trumpy (New England vs. Miami)

===== 1986–1987 =====
====== Wild Card playoffs ======
1. Don Criqui/Bob Trumpy (New York Jets vs. Kansas City)
2. Mel Proctor/Dave Rowe (Washington vs. Los Angeles Rams)

====== Divisional playoffs ======
1. Tom Davis/Stan White (Cleveland vs. New York Jets)
2. Mel Proctor/Dave Rowe (Washington vs. Chicago)
3. Don Criqui/Bob Trumpy (New York Giants vs. San Francisco)
4. Mel Proctor/Dave Rowe (Denver vs. New England)

====== Conference Championships ======
1. Mel Proctor/Dave Rowe (Denver vs. Cleveland)
2. Don Criqui/Bob Trumpy (New York Giants vs. Washington)

=== Pro Bowl ===
==== 1986 ====
1. Don Criqui/Bob Trumpy

==== 1987 ====
1. Mel Proctor/Bob Trumpy

== NBC's later relationship with the NFL ==
NBC Radio was bought by Westwood One in 1987, shortly after NBC Radio lost NFL rights. Additionally, Westwood One has owned the rights (either alone or in conjunction with CBS) to broadcast NFL games since NBC Radio lost them, and generally broadcast NFL games under the title CBS Radio Sports in conjunction with CBS Radio. Westwood One (along with its NFL rights) was acquired by Dial Global in 2011, and following the 2011 postseason Dial Global retired the Westwood One branding. In 2012, Dial Global announced it would be the distributor for NBC Sports Radio programming once the network launched in 2013. Though Dial Global changed its name to back to Westwood One in 2013, the organization distributed NBC Sports Radio programs from 2013 to 2020. Through this period, though NBC Sports Radio aired general discussion of NFL games and news, broadcast coverage of live NFL games continued to be carried solely by the national program NFL on Westwood One Sports and local radio broadcasters. However, Westwood One does presently acknowledge the NBC Radio broadcasts in 1986 as part of the entire history of the network's football coverage.

=== NBC NFL Sunday (2006 radio program) ===
NBC Television broadcast at least some NFL games every season from 1965 to 1997, when they lost the rights to carry the American Football Conference package to CBS. In 2006, the NBC television network resumed their National Football League coverage under the NBC Sunday Night Football umbrella. As part of the relaunch of their coverage, NBC became a co-producer of Westwood One's radio pregame/highlight show NFL Sunday, adding the network's name to the coverage and turning it into an abbreviated radio version of Football Night in America. Al Trautwig hosted the show for the first several weeks of the season before being taken off the coverage for unspecified reasons. Chris Carlin subbed for Trautwig for a week before Scott Graham took over the hosting duties and continued to helm the show for the remainder of the season. In addition to the typical NFL Sunday score rundown and a preview of the game ahead, NBC analysts (usually Jerome Bettis or Cris Collinsworth) would provide commentary. After the 2006 season, Westwood One returned NFL Sunday to its previous format and ended the co-production arrangement with NBC.
