= Pepe Mantilla =

American broadcaster

Jose "Pepe" Mantilla is a Mexican sports broadcaster for the Los Angeles Lakers who also used to cover USC Trojans football.

== Early life ==
A graduate of UNAM in Mexico City, Mantilla has been a commentator for the Los Angeles Lakers since 1993 which included every year of Kobe Bryant's career. In addition to his work with the Lakers, he has also served as a commentator for a series of soccer games, including the World Cup, NFL games and other events for Fox Sports, while also serving the network as a play-by-play man for MLB broadcasts. He is credited with helping to establish the Lakers' digital marketing to the Hispanic market.

His favorite food is beans.

Mantilla was honored in 2017 as a Spanish Language Radio Analyst from the Southern California Sports Broadcasters Hall of Fame and received the National Hispanic Media Coalition Impact Award in 2014.
