= Scott Graham =

American sportscaster

- Born: June 10, 1965 (age 61); Belleville, New Jersey, U.S.
- Education: University of Pennsylvania (B.A.)

Scott Graham (born June 10, 1965) is an American sportscaster, who was previously the play-by play television announcer for the Philadelphia Phillies. He also has worked with NFL Films and has hosted The NFL on Westwood One.

== Early life and education ==
Graham was born in Belleville, New Jersey, on June 10, 1965. attended Pingry School in Bernards Township, New Jersey in 1983 and then the University of Pennsylvania, where he graduated with a BA in political science.

== Career ==
=== Collegiate sports broadcasting ===
Graham's first play-by-play experience came as a student announcer for football and basketball on WXPN as University of Pennsylvania student. After graduating from Penn, Graham was hired as sports director at WAMS in Wilmington, Delaware, where he worked from 1987 to 1989. From 1990 to 1992, he called college football games for Delaware State University in Dover, Delaware, and then for the University of Pennsylvania for three years.

From 1992 to 1998, he called Philadelphia's Big Five basketball games on WPHT-AM.

In 1994, he hosted a nationally syndicated baseball call-in show and called major college football games for the American Sports Radio Network. In 1996, Graham was hired by Comcast Network as an announcer for all sporting events on the station.

Graham provided the narration for the Puppy Bowl from 2012 until 2020 on Animal Planet. His late Phillies partner Harry Kalas had narrated the program from 2005 to 2009. Graham also does voiceover work for the WWE Network program Rivalries.

Graham called play-by-play of the 2016 NCAA Final Four and National Championship Game on TruTV as part of the Villanova University's "Team Stream" broadcast with former Villanova and NFL wide receiver Brian Finneran. He reprised the role when Villanova returned to the Final Four two years later, paired this time with Wildcat and NBA player Randy Foye.

=== Philadelphia Phillies ===
Graham was first hired by the Philadelphia Phillies in 1991, and hosted the pre-and post-game shows through the 2000 season. In 1999, he also became a play-by-play announcer for the team. He called the first, second, and third innings of games on the radio, the fourth, fifth, and sixth innings on the local telecast, and then returned to the radio broadcast to call the seventh, eighth, and ninth innings. After every Phillies victory, his signature call would be "Put this one in the win column for the Fightin' Phils!" Another signature call was his home run call: "That ball is gone-a!"

In November 2006, The Philadelphia Inquirer reported that Graham's contract would not be renewed, which was confirmed on December 4, 2006. Graham was a finalist for a position with the San Diego Padres for the 2007 season but the job went to Andy Masur.

In late November 2007, he was a possible candidate for the New York Mets radio broadcast vacancy left by Tom McCarthy. The Mets hired Wayne Hagin for the position.

=== NFL and NFL Europe broadcasting ===
From 1999 to 2003, he called NFL and NFL Europe games on Fox. In 2006, Graham began working as a pregame host for Sunday Night Football coverage on Westwood One. In 2009, he became Westwood One's studio host for all NFL games except Monday night, replacing Tommy Tighe.

In 2009, he began co-hosting Baseball This Morning on SiriusXM satellite radio channel 175 with Buck Martinez from 7:00–10:00 a.m. ET. In February 2010, he left the morning show along with Martinez.

Also in 2009, Graham was named as the voice of Showtime's Inside the NFL program, taking over the duties of his late former Philadelphia Phillies' broadcast partner and fellow NFL Films narrator Harry Kalas.

Graham made his Inside the NFL debut on the September 9, 2009, episode. He also does pre- and post-game NFL coverage for Westwood One radio. He was the public address system announcer at MetLife Stadium for Super Bowl XLVIII, at University of Phoenix Stadium for Super Bowl XLIX, and Levi's Stadium for Super Bowl 50.

=== KYW news radio ===
In 2023, Graham joined KYW, Philadelphia's primary news radio station as a radio news anchor.

== Personal life ==
Graham resides in Voorhees Township, New Jersey, in suburban Philadelphia.

== Sources ==
- MLB.com – Philadelphia Phillies: Broadcasters
