= Fox One =

American video streaming service

- Logo used since 2025
- Website type: Streaming television, OTT platform
- Available in: 2 languages
- List of languages: English; Spanish
- Country of origin: United States
- Area served: U.S., U.S. territories, and Mexico
- Owner: Fox Corporation
- CEO: Pete Distad
- Industry: Entertainment, mass media
- Products: Streaming media, video on demand, digital distribution
- Website: www.fox.com (U.S. and U.S. territories); www.foxone.mx (Mexico)
- Commercial: Yes
- Registration: Required
- Launched: August 21, 2025; 14 months ago
- Current status: Active

Fox One is a streaming television service owned by Fox Corporation that was launched on August 21, 2025. The service includes programming from all of Fox's broadcast and most of their cable properties, except Fox Soccer Plus. Pay TV providers which provide access to the company's networks through TV Everywhere authentication will automatically allow access to the service for their subscribers for no additional cost, including streaming access to Fox affiliates.

== History ==
In July 2023, Fox shut down its TV Everywhere app "Fox Now", splitting up its networks and content amongst the Fox Sports, Fox News, Fox Local, and Tubi apps. Less than two years later, in February 2025, following the cancellation of the proposed joint venture Venu Sports, Fox hired Venu's former CEO, Pete Distad and announced a replacement service, named Fox One.

In early August 2025, Fox announced the service would launch on August 21 and cost $19.99 per month at launch. A bundle with Fox Nation would cost $24.99 per month. There will be no original nor exclusive content specifically produced for the service.

Fox One was officially launched in the United States on August 21, 2025, by Fox Corporation. The service was introduced as the company’s first unified streaming platform combining its news, sports, and entertainment programming, ignoring Fox Now's previous existence. On October 2, 2025, Fox One added a bundled subscription with ESPN Unlimited priced at $39.99 per month, giving subscribers access to ESPN’s linear networks, ESPN+, and other digital sports content.

On October 20, 2025, it was announced that the service would launch in Mexico, replacing Caliente TV. It would be available on Claro Video starting that day, gradually on other platforms, and as a standalone app starting at the end of the year.

== Programming ==
=== United States ===
The service includes live and on-demand access to Fox Broadcasting Company, Fox's regional owned-and-operated stations, Fox News, Fox Business, Fox Weather, Fox Sports, Fox Sports 1, Fox Sports 2, Big Ten Network, and Fox Deportes. Subscribers are able to bundle Fox Nation, Big Ten Plus, and/or ESPN's direct-to-consumer streaming service for an additional fee.

=== International ===
The platform features sports content from the Fox channel in Mexico, including Liga MX, Liga MX Femenil, UEFA Champions League, Concacaf Champions Cup, Premier League, Ligue 1, MLB, LMB, Formula E, Lucha Libre AAA Worldwide, among others.

== See also ==
- List of streaming media services
