= NFL+ =

Subscription sports streaming service

- Available in: English
- Predecessors: NFL Field Pass; NFL Audio Pass; NFL Game Rewind; NFL Game Pass (U.S. version)
- Area served: United States
- Owner: National Football League
- Website: https://www.nfl.com/plus
- Users: 2 million (As of 2023)

NFL Game Pass International
- Available in: English
- Area served: Outside the United States
- Owner: DAZN (worldwide licensee: 2023–32)
- Website: https://www.dazn.com/nfl-game-pass

NFL+ is an over-the-top subscription service operated by the National Football League (NFL) in the United States. The service offers live-streaming of the radio broadcasts of all NFL games, streaming of the television broadcasts of in-market games on mobile devices, streaming of out-of-market preseason games, live access to NFL Network, and library content from NFL Films. The service's premium tier offers on-demand replays of NFL games, including alternate "All-22" and "Coaches Film" presentations, and live access to NFL RedZone.

Outside the United States, NFL Game Pass International is distributed by the over-the-top streaming service DAZN, either a standalone subscription or an add-on to an existing DAZN package. The primary differences between the domestic NFL+ service and the international Game Pass version are that the latter is generally sold as a single combined tier, and also includes live streaming of regular season and postseason games regardless of device.

The services are an amalgamation of several streaming services previously offered by the NFL. NFL Audio Pass (formerly NFL Field Pass) originally launched in 2003 in partnership with RealNetworks to stream radio broadcasts of NFL games. In 2006, the league launched NFL Game Pass as its streaming service for international markets, offering both live and on-demand replays of game for those outside the United States. The league then launched NFL Game Rewind in 2008 to offer on-demand replays to U.S. customers before merging it with NFL Audio Pass in 2015 to form a U.S. version of NFL Game Pass. In turn, the U.S. version of Game Pass was merged with the NFL's in-market mobile streaming rights (formerly held by Verizon Media) in 2022 to form NFL+. DAZN then signed a ten-year deal in 2023 to distribute the international version of NFL Game Pass.

== History ==
In January 2003, the NFL announced a partnership with RealNetworks to serve as its streaming media partner, offering exclusive multimedia features during the playoffs via the company's RealOne SuperPass subscription service. Chris Russo, the league's senior vice president of new media and publishing, stated that the playoff content was a pilot that could lead to "a subscription program that includes elements such as video, audio, enhanced analysis and fantasy football" in the future.

Ahead of the 2003 NFL season, the NFL launched two subscription services in partnership with RealNetworks, including NFL.com Fantasy Extra–which offered expanded analysis and video content oriented towards fantasy football players, and NFL Field Pass–which would carry the radio broadcasts for all NFL games, video features on NFL.com (including game highlights), the weekly program NFL Insider Radio, and coverage of team press conferences. To enforce exclusive regional rights and encourage use of the service, the NFL prohibited local radio affiliates from including game broadcasts in their internet radio streams.

In 2006, the NFL launched NFL Game Pass as its streaming service for international markets in cooperation with Yahoo! Sports; without the regional or national rights restrictions in the United States, this international version could offer live NFL games, as well as live access to NFL Network and NFL RedZone.

The league later launched NFL Game Rewind in 2008 for U.S. users, offering on-demand streaming of completed NFL games, including "Coaches Film" and "All-22" feeds. NFL Field Pass was renamed NFL Audio Pass prior to the 2010 season. That year, the NFL also started live streaming preseason games online. In 2015, the NFL merged NFL Game Rewind with NFL Audio Pass, forming a single service under the NFL Game Pass branding in the United States.

The NFL previously maintained an exclusive mobile streaming rights package with Verizon Communications, as part of its official wireless carrier sponsorship of the league; streaming of in-market and nationally televised games on smartphones was exclusive to the Verizon-operated "NFL Mobile" service, which was only available as a paid add-on for Verizon Wireless subscribers. This exclusivity deal prohibited the NFL's television partners from streaming their telecasts on smartphones, thus network-run TV Everywhere streams could only be viewed on PCs and tablet computers. Under a five-year extension of the agreement beginning in the 2017–18 NFL playoffs and 2018 NFL season, Verizon waived this exclusivity to take advantage of its acquisition of Yahoo!; mobile in-market streams, as well as other NFL-related digital content, was made available via Yahoo! Sports, while NFL broadcasters were authorized to stream games via their platforms on all device classes.

In May 2022, it was reported that with the expiration of the NFL's agreement with Verizon (which had divested AOL and Yahoo! to Apollo Global Management in 2021), its teams had approved a proposal to paywall mobile in-market streams behind a new "NFL Plus" service. NFL+ was officially announced on July 25, 2022, succeeding the U.S. version of Game Pass. The service was split into two tiers of the service, with the basic service offering in-market streaming on mobile devices, streaming of radio broadcasts and most preseason games, as well as library content from NFL Films and NFL Network. The on-demand replays of games then became available on the premium tier of NFL+.

In 2023, live access of NFL Network and NFL RedZone was added to the basic and premium tiers of NFL+, respectively. DAZN also signed a ten-year agreement to distribute the NFL Game Pass International service, either as a standalone subscription or as an add-on to an existing DAZN package. In addition to offering live and on-demand replays of games, and live access to NFL Network and NFL RedZone, the international version also offers other NFL and DAZN related programming.

In 2024, DAZN launched NFL Travel Pass, a weekly subscription allowing Americans traveling abroad to stream games, who would otherwise be geo-blocked from accessing NFL+ outside the United States and would have to pay full price for a regular monthly or annual NFL Game Pass International subscription.

In 2025, ESPN and the NFL reached an agreement that includes the opportunity for fans to bundle ESPN’s DTC service with NFL+ Premium, as well as through a Disney+ bundle.

== See also ==
- NFL Sunday Ticket
