= NFL on Fox =

NFL football broadcast telecasts (1994–present)

- Logo used since 2014
- Genre: American football game telecasts
- Presented by: Fox NFL Sunday crew List of NFL on Fox broadcasters
- Narrated by: Dick Ervasti (1994–2001); John Garry (2006–present)
- Theme music composer: Scott Schreer
- Opening theme: "NFL on Fox theme music"
- Ending theme: Same as opening
- Country of origin: United States
- Original language: English
- No. of seasons: 33 (through 2026 season)
- No. of episodes: 3,300+

Production
- Production locations: Various NFL stadiums (game telecasts); Fox Network Center; Los Angeles (pre-game, halftime and post-game shows)
- Camera setup: Multi-camera
- Running time: 210 minutes and until game ends (inc. adverts)
- Production companies: National Football League; Fox Sports

Original release
- Network: Fox; Fox One
- Release: August 12, 1994 – present

Related
- Fox NFL Sunday; Fox NFL Kickoff

The NFL on Fox is an American presentation of the National Football League (NFL) games produced by Fox Sports, and televised on the Fox television network and streaming service Fox One.

Game coverage is usually preceded by Fox NFL Kickoff and Fox NFL Sunday and is followed on weeks when the network airs a Doubleheader by The OT. The latter two shows feature the same studio hosts and analysts for both programs, who also contribute to the former. In weeks when Fox airs a doubleheader, the late broadcast (which airs nationwide in nearly all markets, there typically being only one to three games taking place at the time) airs under the brand America's Game of the Week, frequently featuring the Dallas Cowboys due to their national appeal.

Fox aired its inaugural NFL game telecast on August 12, 1994, with a preseason game between the Denver Broncos and the San Francisco 49ers at Candlestick Park in San Francisco. Coverage formally began the following month on September 4, with the premiere of Fox NFL Sunday, followed by a slate of six regionally televised regular season games on the first Sunday of the 1994 season.

== History ==
Though Fox was growing rapidly as a network, and had established itself as a presence, it was still not considered a major competitor to the more established "Big Three" broadcast networks (ABC, CBS and NBC). Fox management, having seen the critical role that soccer programming had played in the growth of British satellite service BSkyB, believed that sports, and specifically professional football, would be the engine that would turn Fox into a major network the quickest.

=== Early bids ===
To this end, Fox had bid aggressively for football broadcast rights almost from the start. It notably passed on the original United States Football League (USFL), which had hoped to move to the fall in 1986, the same time Fox was to debut, and was seeking a broadcast contract; the USFL would shut down instead. In 1987, Fox's first full year on the air, ABC initially hedged on renewing its contract to carry Monday Night Football – then the league's crown-jewel program – and was in the middle of negotiations to reach a new contract, due to an increased expense of the rights. Fox made an offer to the NFL to acquire the Monday Night Football contract for the same amount ABC that had been paying to carry the package, about US$1.3 billion at the time. However, the NFL, in part because Fox had not yet established itself as a major network, chose to renew its contract with ABC.

Meanwhile, after the Fox Broadcasting Company was launched, David Dixon, founder of the above-mentioned USFL, proposed the creation of the "American Football Federation", a spring league that would be made up of ten teams and draft high school graduates who were declared academically ineligible to play College Football by the NCAA. The proposed league never came to fruition.

Despite having a few successful shows in its slate and scoring a major coup when longtime NBC affiliate WSVN in Miami switched to Fox in 1989 after NBC bought longtime CBS affiliate WTVJ, Fox did not have a significant market share until the early 1990s when Fox parent News Corporation (which became 21st Century Fox through the July 2013 spin-off of its publishing unit, now the current News Corp.) began to upgrade some of its local affiliates – and eventually purchased additional stations from other television station groups, such as New World Communications and Chris-Craft Industries' BHC Communications and United Television, making it the largest owner of television stations in the United States. The time now filled by NFL on Fox on Sunday afternoons during the fall and winter months was formerly in the control of the stations themselves (and still is to some extent outside of the NFL season, particularly during weeks when no sports programming is scheduled at all by Fox, as well as on non-doubleheader weeks during the season or in home markets when a competing channel is airing a home game cancelling a doubleheader on Fox stations in those areas), which usually filled the timeslots with either syndicated television series (both first-run and off-network) and/or movie blocks. The Sunday afternoon timeslot in the spring is filled by NASCAR on Fox's coverage of the NASCAR Cup Series.

=== Fox outbids CBS for the NFC package ===
Six years after its first attempt, the league's television contracts for both conferences and for the Sunday and Monday prime time football packages came up for renewal again in 1993.

Many expected that the NFL would receive less money than the $3.6 billion for four years that ABC, CBS, NBC, TNT, and ESPN had paid in 1990. Fox wanted the NFL to build credibility for itself; even those working in television thought of it as "the one that has that cartoon show" (The Simpsons). More than 85% of affiliates were UHF stations. Knowing that it would likely need to bid considerably more than the incumbent networks, Fox bid $1.58 billion to obtain a four-year contract for the broadcast rights to the National Football Conference (NFC), exceeding CBS's bid by more than $100 million per year. The NFC was considered the more desirable conference than the American Football Conference (AFC), whose television package was being carried at the time by NBC, due to the NFC's presence in most of the largest U.S. markets, such as New York City, Chicago, Philadelphia, and Dallas, the last of which was gaining a national following in the 1990s. Fox also caught CBS at an inopportune time, as the network was in a distant third in the ratings at the time and was going under cost-cutting measures under Laurence Tisch (whose family co-owns the New York Giants) that would eventually lead to its sale to Westinghouse Broadcasting in 1995.

Despite so much skepticism that Fox had to assure the NFL and media that Bart Simpson would not be an announcer, to the surprise of many in the sports and media industries, on December 17, 1993, the NFL selected the bid offered by Fox, stripping CBS of football for the first time since 1956. Fox's coverage, in addition to being able to televise NFC regular season and playoff games, also included the exclusive U.S. television rights to Super Bowl XXXI (held in 1997) under the initial contract, which took effect with the 1994 season.

The unexpectedly high bids from Fox and other networks increased the NFL salary cap, new in 1994, to $34 million from the predicted $32 million. Tisch had apparently underestimated the value of its NFL rights with respect to its advertising revenues and to its promotional opportunities for other programming on the network. Indeed, Fox was still an upstart player in 1993, not yet considered on par with CBS, NBC and ABC, the three longer established major networks (Fox, by comparison, had debuted in October 1986 as the only venture at a fourth television network since the 1956 demise of the DuMont Television Network to truly compete with the "Big Three"). The network already had offbeat hits such as The Simpsons, Married... with Children, and Beverly Hills, 90210 on its schedule. However, Fox did not have a sports division up to that point, and its news division was a few years away from fruition (most Fox stations outside of a few owned by the network did not even produce their own news programming), and most Fox affiliates were often either full-power UHF stations or low-powered stations. In addition, there were some smaller markets that were not yet served by a local Fox affiliate; back in 1991, the Foxnet cable channel began operations to provide the network's programming to those areas until a new over-the-air affiliate was made available.

==== CBS personalities move to Fox and major affiliation switches ====
John Madden joked when he joined the network that it should be called Fox Sport, "because the only sport we had at Fox was football, NFL football", but Rupert Murdoch's vast resources allowed the network to grow quickly, primarily to the detriment of CBS. After bringing in David Hill from Murdoch's U.K.-based Sky Sports to head-up the new Fox Sports division, Fox began luring over members of the CBS Sports staff, hiring longtime producer Ed Goren as Hill's second-in-command. Fox was also able to procure Pat Summerall and Madden to be its lead broadcast team, a capacity they had been serving for CBS. Terry Bradshaw, who was previously co-host of The NFL Today, was added to serve as the pregame show's lead analyst. Dick Stockton and Matt Millen also came over from CBS and became the network's #2 broadcast team, while James Brown, who had called play-by-play for CBS' game telecasts, was hired to be the studio host.

Fox also hired a set of the next generation of young, up-and-coming play-by-play announcers for its lower-level broadcast crews: 26-year-old Kenny Albert, son of legendary sports announcer Marv Albert; 30-year-old Thom Brennaman, son of longtime Cincinnati Reds announcer Marty Brennaman; 25-year-old Joe Buck, son of legendary sports announcer Jack Buck; and 34-year-old Kevin Harlan, son of Green Bay Packers executive Bob Harlan.

Fox sought to raise its station profile as the start of its NFL contract came closer by approaching other broadcasters about switching their VHF stations (channels 2 to 13) to the network from one of the other established networks. On May 23, 1994, News Corporation struck an alliance with New World Communications, a television and film production company that by now was a key station group with several VHF CBS affiliates in NFC markets in its portfolio, and wary of a CBS without football. Through the deal, in which also Fox purchased a 20% interest in the company, nearly all of New World's stations (including several that the company was in the process of acquiring from Citicasters and Argyle Communications at the time the deal was struck) switched en masse to Fox beginning that September and continuing through September 1996 as existing affiliation contracts with their previous network partners came to an end (network subsidiary Fox Television Stations bought New World Communications outright in July 1996).

In the summer of 1994, SF Broadcasting (a recently formed joint venture between Fox and Savoy Pictures) purchased four stations from Burnham Broadcasting, which also became Fox affiliates between September 1995 and January 1996. In the NFC markets affected by the deals, Fox gained VHF affiliates in eight primary markets (Atlanta, Dallas, Detroit, Green Bay, New Orleans, Phoenix, St. Louis and Tampa) and three satellite markets (Austin, Greensboro and Milwaukee), adding to the four that the network had before the deal. The new affiliates in St. Louis and Greensboro switched shortly before the Rams relocated from Los Angeles and the Carolina Panthers began play with the 1995 preseason. Besides giving the network leverage in attracting new affiliates, the rights gave Fox many new viewers and a platform for advertising its other shows.

Fox's acquisition of the National Football Conference contract severely affected CBS, beyond losing a marquee sporting event and some of its key talent and production staff. Not only was it largely relegated to former Fox affiliates and lesser known independent stations in the markets affected by Fox's affiliation agreement with New World, but CBS' older-skewing programming slate caused it to struggle further in the ratings, pushing it to third place, ahead of fourth-place Fox. CBS had hoped to replace the NFL with National Hockey League (NHL) rights, but Fox then promptly outbid CBS for those as well; in addition, Fox took over the rights to Major League Baseball (MLB) in 1996, after the cancellation of The Baseball Network, which was a joint venture between NBC and ABC at the time and had replaced CBS two years prior. CBS began rebuilding itself after the network took the AFC television contract from NBC in 1998.

=== A brand new era ===
Fox's acquisition of National Football League television rights was a watershed event not only for Fox, but for the NFL as well. Not only was it the event that placed Fox on a par with the "Big Three" broadcast networks, but it also ushered in an era of growth for the NFL, which continues on to this day. While the heavy concentration of major cities in NFC markets compared to the smaller markets generally served by the AFC that virtually guaranteed a substantial audience, its instant success has nonetheless been remarkable given the differences between Fox's coverage and the coverage provided by ABC, CBS, ESPN, TNT and NBC up to that time.

==== "Same Game, New Attitude" ====
Fox used the slogan "Same Game, New Attitude" to promote its new NFL package (it did the same for its new Major League Baseball coverage in 1996). The network's pre-game show, Fox NFL Sunday focused more on entertainment and less on in-depth discussion of game strategy.

Hill, who later said "Most of my concepts about the way sport should be produced, I’ve stolen from video games", suggested to Madden that broadcasts resemble Madden NFL. Fox's NFL coverage introduced bolder and innovative graphics, for instance, the FoxBox, a continuous on-screen time-and-score graphic that Hill had originally used on Sky Sports's coverage of the Premier League. It also used parabolic microphones to include the sounds of the stands and of the on-field action (including conversations and strategy outlines between coaches and players). These innovations were adopted by rival networks and helped to drive the development of further innovations such as the on-air display of virtual first-down and scrimmage lines.

==== 1990s ====
To help kick off NFL coverage on Fox, the NFL gave Fox the doubleheader for Week 1 in 1994. The NFL schedule makers also gave Fox a gift: a rivalry game between the Dallas Cowboys and Pittsburgh Steelers at Three Rivers Stadium. Attracting two of the NFL's largest fanbases as well as the two-time defending Super Bowl champions, the game (a 26-7 Cowboys win in what would be a preview of Super Bowl XXX the following year) would be given the national doubleheader slot with Summerall and Madden as Fox's first nationally-televised matchup.

In 1989, John Madden, then of CBS awarded the first "Turkey Leg Award", for the Thanksgiving Day game's most valuable player. Pursuant to its name, it was an actual cooked turkey leg, and players typically took a celebratory bite out of the leg for the cameras during post-game interviews. The gesture was seen mostly as a humorous gimmick relating to Madden's famous multi-legged turkey, Madden brought the award to Fox in 1994, and it continued through 2001. Because of the loose and informal nature of the award, at times it has been awarded to multiple players. On one occasion in 1994, it was given to players of both teams.

The Week 15, 1995 match-up between the Arizona Cardinals and the San Diego Chargers was part of an experiment by Fox where Terry Bradshaw and Jimmy Johnson provided analysis throughout the game with no play-by-play.

At the end of the 1996 season, Fox broadcast its first ever Super Bowl. Super Bowl XXXI would be the first of three Super Bowls to be called by Pat Summerall and John Madden while with Fox (Super Bowls XXXIII and XXXVI being the others). The telecast ended up being the highest-rated program in the history of the then ten-year-old Fox network, and it currently ties Super Bowl XLII for the highest-rated program in the entire history of the network. Fox's broadcast was also the first Super Bowl to have a constant, live-updating graphic for the score, time and down, and distance. The FoxBox was used also in Super Bowl XXXIII, and the graphic positioned over live action has become the norm in virtually all sports broadcasts at the national and regional production levels.

Following the 1997 season, Joe Buck did not call another NFL game on Fox until 2001. For Fox's first two years of NFL coverage, Buck was paired with Tim Green on the fourth-tier team. And in 1997, Buck was teamed with Bill Maas on the fourth-tier team. Between the 1998-2000 seasons, Buck would often be assigned to working at Fox NFL Sunday studio for halftime coverage whenever the main pregame crew was on the road. Kevin Harlan left Fox after this season to join the NFL on CBS. Harlan and Bill Maas anchored Fox's halftime coverage for Week 6, as the Fox NFL Sunday crew did the pregame show from Green Bay's Lambeau Field.

In 1998, Fox had a broadcast of the Washington Redskins/Tampa Bay Buccaneers game scheduled for Week 16. On the day the game was supposed to be broadcast, President Bill Clinton was impeached by Congress and Fox broke into local programming to cover the events. The football game (called by Sam Rosen and Jerry Glanville) began as scheduled and was shown in split screen. Jerry Glanville left Fox after this season to join The NFL Today on CBS.

For Fox's coverage of Super Bowl XXXIII at the end of the 1998 season, the starting lineups were shown using a virtual television. To television viewers, it appeared as if the end zone opened up and a giant television came up out of the ground. The virtual television displayed video announcing the starting lineups. The virtual television effect was provided by PVI Virtual Media Services using their L-VIS virtual graphics system.

===== 2000s =====
2001 was the final year of commentating NFL games full-time for Pat Summerall, as his retirement was announced earlier that year. 2001 was also John Madden's last year of commentating on Fox, as he moved to ABC to commentate on Monday Night Football alongside Al Michaels. Madden would soon become the first person to announce Super Bowls on different networks in consecutive years when he called Super Bowl XXXVII on ABC with Michaels.

Fox's telecast of Super Bowl XXXVI was presented in a 480p enhanced-definition widescreen format marketed as "Fox Widescreen". While promoted as having better quality than standard-definition, and being the first U.S. sporting event produced in a widescreen format with the same production as the main feed for standard-definition viewers (rather than using a separate production for the widescreen feed), it was not true high definition, but still matched the aspect ratio of HDTV sets. As previously alluded to, this was Summerall's 26th and final Super Bowl broadcast on television or radio. It was also the eighth and final Super Bowl telecast (and final NFL telecast of any kind) for the Summerall and Madden announcing team. The two had become the NFL's most famous broadcast duo since they were paired together in 1981 on CBS.

Joe Buck, Troy Aikman, and Cris Collinsworth replaced Pat Summerall and John Madden as the number 1 announcing team. Summerall, however, would continue to work for Fox in 2002, calling almost all Dallas Cowboys games alongside Brian Baldinger. One notable exception was in Week 8, when Summerall called the Cowboys-Seattle Seahawks game alongside Daryl Johnston and Baldinger worked the Arizona Cardinals-San Francisco 49ers game alongside Kenny Albert. At this point, it would become common practice for Joe Buck to take time off from calling NFL games in order to cover postseason baseball for Fox.

When John Madden left Fox after 2001, the network introduced a new award for their Thanksgiving Day telecast starting in 2002, named the "Galloping Gobbler." It was represented by a small figurine of a cartoonish, silver turkey wearing a football helmet striking a Heisman-like pose. Much like Cleatus and Digger, the original Galloping Gobbler trophy reflected Fox's irreverent mascots, and went through several iterations. Unimpressed by its tackiness after having won four Turkey Legs in the 1990s, the inaugural winner, Emmitt Smith, famously threw the 2002 award into a trash can.

Following the 2004 season, Cris Collinsworth left Fox Sports. After sitting out the 2005 season, he returned to NBC Sports for the 2006 season. For the 2006 season (the first after James Brown left to return to CBS as host of The NFL Today), Fox experimented with a traveling pre-game show, hosted by Joe Buck from the site of the game to which he was assigned. The halftime and postgame shows were hosted by Curt Menefee. During Week 14 of the regular season, Thom Brennaman, Charles Davis and Barry Alvarez took over the #4 team for Sam Rosen and Tim Ryan.

During Weeks 6–8 of the 2006 regular season, Dick Stockton filled in for Joe Buck, during the MLB playoffs, and Kenny Albert filled in for Stockton, who was filling in for Buck. During Weeks 6–8 of the 2007 regular season, Kenny Albert filled in for Buck, during the MLB playoffs. During Week 6 and 7 of the 2007 regular season, Matt Vasgersian filled in for Albert, who was filling in for Buck. During Week 7 of the 2007 regular season, Matt Devlin filled in for Vasgersian, who was filling in Albert. And during Week 8 of the 2007 regular season, Thom Brennaman filled in for Albert, who was filling in for Buck.

November 8, 2009 (Week 9) featured a special two-hour pregame show originating in Afghanistan. The regular Fox NFL Sunday crew hosted the pregame show; Chris Rose served as studio host and anchored in-game highlights. John Lynch and Trent Green served as studio analysts for the halftime and postgame reports.

===== 2010s =====
2010 was Chris Rose's final season calling NFL games for Fox until he departed for MLB Network. Rose was a part of the eighth-tier team with Ross Tucker. During Week 5 of the regular season, Chris Myers filled in for Dick Stockton, who was calling MLB playoffs for TBS. Myers also filled in for in for Rose during Weeks 11 and 13 of the regular season. At this point, Joe Buck, Troy Aikman, and Pam Oliver became Fox's longest-tenured broadcast team, surpassing the team of Pat Summerall and John Madden. During Weeks 6-8 of the regular season, Thom Brennaman filled in for Buck during the MLB playoffs. During Weeks 15-17 of the regular season Charles Davis filled in for Jim Mora, who accepted the head coaching job at UCLA Bruins in 2012.

During Week 6 of the 2012 regular season, Thom Brennaman was set to call the New York Giants vs. San Francisco 49ers football game instead of Joe Buck, who was scheduled to call the National League Championship Series. Sam Rosen was scheduled to fill in for Thom Brennaman while Brennaman filled in for Buck. However, Fox Sports president Eric Shanks brought up the idea of a two sport, same-day doubleheader if both the San Francisco Giants and St. Louis Cardinals won their divisional series. When St. Louis beat the Washington Nationals on Friday night, Buck went to San Francisco instead of Washington, D.C. and called both the 49ers football game and the Giants baseball game.

Fox did not send its #2 team of Kenny Albert, Daryl Johnston, and Tony Siragusa to cover the playoffs in 2012, marking the first time since Fox acquired NFL rights that they did this. Instead the #3 team of Thom Brennaman and Brian Billick were in the booth for the Divisional Playoffs, as they called the Seattle Seahawks at Atlanta Falcons match-up. Erin Andrews, who had joined Fox after leaving ESPN, joined the #1 team of Buck, Aikman, and Oliver for the playoffs that year. Chris Myers meanwhile joined the Brennaman/Billick/Laura Okmin crew for the Divisional game.

After the 2012 season, Ron Pitts left Fox Sports after being part of the NFL broadcast team for 18 years and joined OK!TV. Kevin Burkhardt replaced him. The following year, Burkhardt, John Lynch, and Andrews called the Divisional Playoff game between the New Orleans Saints and the Seattle Seahawks. Andrews once again joined Pam Oliver as sideline reporter for Wild Card weekend, NFC Championship, Thanksgiving, and Super Bowl XLVIII. Andrews and Oliver would later swap teams the following season with Andrews joining Buck and Aikman, and Oliver joining Burkhardt and Lynch.

Meanwhile, Brian Billick was not offered a contract extension with the NFL on Fox after his contract expired after the 2013 season. Tim Ryan left Fox after 2013 when he accepted the job as the San Francisco 49ers radio color commentator. And Tom McCarthy left Fox after 2013 and joined rival CBS. David Diehl replaced Billick as Thom Brennaman's analyst, while Ronde Barber replaced Ryan as Chris Myers' analyst. For Week 7, Tim Brando replaced Mike Goldberg after Goldberg performed poorly during a Week 6 game and cursed out his critics on Twitter.

During Weeks 6–8 of the 2013 season, Thom Brennaman filled in for Joe Buck, Sam Rosen filled in for Kevin Burkhardt, and Charissa Thompson filled in for Erin Andrews; Joe Buck, Kevin Burkhardt, and Erin Andrews were all on Major League Baseball on Fox playoff duty. Meanwhile, Justin Kutcher filled in for Thom Brennaman. During Week 13 of the 2013 season, Dick Stockton, Brady Quinn, and Kristina Pink were assigned college football responsibilities, leading to a makeshift #6 team. As the rotational broadcaster Brennaman was moved down to fill in for Stockton. He was joined by Donovan McNabb and Charissa Thompson. Kutcher once again filled in for Brennaman. In Week 15, Kutcher again filled in for Brennaman because this time, Brennaman had voice problems.

In 2015, Charles Davis replaces David Diehl as Thom Brennaman's analyst. Meanwhile, Sam Rosen replaced Mike Goldberg and Tim Brando on the #7 team. Kirk Morrison moved down to the #7 team and was joined by Chris Cooley and Matt Millen as rotating analysts. Laura Okmin and Tony Siragusa swapped broadcast teams as sideline reporters/analysts, joining the #3 and #4 teams, respectively. Holly Sonders joined the #3 and #5 team as a rotating sideline reporter. Danielle Trotta joined Peter Schrager as a rotating reporter for the #7 broadcast team. Brady Quinn moved down to the #8 team, where he was joined by his CFB broadcast partner Joe Davis. On September 27, 2015, Richard Deitsch of SI.com reported that, "in an effort to get Holly Sonders reps as an NFL sideline reporter", Fox Sports management pulled various assignments they had originally given Laura Okmin and Jennifer Hale on the #3 and #5 teams, respectively, and reassigned them to Sonders. The 2015 season marked Tony Siragusa's final season with Fox.

During Weeks 5–8 of the 2015 season, Sam Rosen filled in for Kevin Burkhardt while Burkhardt worked the studio shows for Fox's MLB Playoff coverage. During Week 5, Justin Kutcher filled in for Kenny Albert while Albert worked the American League Division Series between the Texas Rangers and Toronto Blue Jays. During Weeks 6 and 8 Thom Brennaman filled in for Joe Buck, Kutcher filled in for Thom Brennaman, and Peter Schrager filled in for Erin Andrews during the MLB Playoffs.

During Week 5 of the 2016 season, Kenny Albert had been scheduled to work the Los Angeles Dodgers-Washington Nationals National League Division Series series and the Washington Redskins-Baltimore Ravens game. Both events occurred 40 miles apart from Friday to Sunday. Rain postponed the Game 2 of the NLDS to Sunday and Fox kept Albert on baseball coverage, with Sam Rosen taking his place alongside Daryl Johnston. Sam Rosen remained with Daryl Johnston in Weeks 6–8, while Kenny Albert was elevated to the #2 team with John Lynch. The 2016 season was John Lynch's last with Fox as he leave to become the general manager of the San Francisco 49ers. During Week 8, Matt Smith filled in for Sam Rosen on #7 broadcast team during the MLB Playoffs. Rosen was with the #2 team in London, filling in for Kevin Burkhardt. During Weeks 6–8, Thom Brennaman filled in for Joe Buck while the latter called the NLCS and World Series. Justin Kutcher took Brennaman's place on the #4 announcing crew.

During Weeks 5–8 of the 2017 season, Kenny Albert filled in for Kevin Burkhardt while Burkhardt worked the studio shows for Fox's MLB Playoff coverage. During Weeks 5–8, Sam Rosen filled in for Kenny Albert while he was with the #2 team. During Weeks 6–8, Thom Brennaman, for the 9th straight year, filled in for Joe Buck while the latter called the ALCS and World Series. Either Dan Hellie or Justin Kutcher took Thom Brennaman's place on the #4 announcing crew. Originally, Jay Cutler was slated to join Kevin Burkhardt and Charles Davis. Cutler ended up coming out of retirement for 2017, signing with the Miami Dolphins due to the injury of Ryan Tannehill.

Also in 2017, Ronde Barber and Daryl Johnston switched broadcast teams; Barber joined Kenny Albert and Johnston joined Chris Myers. Chris Spielman became Thom Brennaman's permanent broadcast partner. However, he became Dan Hellie's temporary partner for Weeks 6 and 7 and Justin Kutcher's temporary partner for Week 8. David Diehl became Sam Rosen's permanent partner except for Week 14 when Brady Quinn joined Rosen and for Week 17 when Matt Millen joined him. Greg Jennings became Tim Brando's temporary partner for the Tampa Bay Buccaneers-Green Bay Packers game on Week 13. Meanwhile, Mark Schlereth joined Fox Sports this year and became Dick Stockton's broadcast partner. Mike Pereira, who previously served as offsite rules analyst, moved to an on-site role with the lead broadcast team for select games. Dean Blandino, who recently resigned from his title as VP of Officiating earlier in the year, replaced Pereira as rules analyst when Pereira was on those select games.

During Week 8 of the 2018 season, for the first time, Thom Brennaman filled in for Kenny Albert as the number 3 team while Joe Buck did the World Series from Dodger Stadium, 5 miles away. Buck remained on Thursday Night Football, going to Houston on the World Series' travel day from Boston to Los Angeles, but he waived the opportunity for a same-day, two-sport doubleheader on Sunday over concerns about getting from one venue to the other in Los Angeles traffic. With Kristina Pink moving to a co-sideline reporter for Thursday Night Football, the #3 team of Kenny Albert/Ronde Barber had rotating sideline reporters throughout the season.

===== 2020s =====
Weeks before the 2020 season, Fox dropped Thom Brennaman following the controversy surrounding his use of a homophobic slur while working as the television voice of the Cincinnati Reds. Kevin Kugler took over Brennaman's slot on the #6 team with Chris Spielman. With Charles Davis departing for CBS, his position at the #2 team with Kevin Burkhardt was filled by Daryl Johnston, who in turn was replaced by Brock Huard and Greg Jennings on the #5 team with Chris Myers. Adam Amin replaced Dick Stockton on the now-promoted #3 pairing with Mark Schlereth, though Stockton would continue to call select games when necessary. Jonathan Vilma replaced Ronde Barber on the #4 team with Kenny Albert.

Spielman left Fox after Week 14 to join the Detroit Lions front office. Huard took over Spielman's place with Kugler. Stockton retired following the season.

The 2021 season saw a few changes on the broadcast team. The #1 team with Buck, Aikman and Andrews added Tom Rinaldi as a second sideline reporter, while the #2 team led by Burkhardt now featured Greg Olsen as its analyst. Johnston was reunited with Myers, while Mark Sanchez was hired and paired alongside Kugler. Gus Johnson and Aqib Talib rounded out the team, and would call a select number of games.

In 2022, Buck and Aikman left Fox to join Monday Night Football. Burkhardt and Olsen were promoted to replace Buck and Aikman on the #1 team. It was announced, however, on May 10, 2022, that Tom Brady would join the #1 team upon his retirement from playing. Meanwhile, Joe Davis, who had replaced Buck as the lead voice of Fox's MLB broadcasts, moved to the #2 team after serving as a fill-in announcer for a number of seasons. Davis was joined by Daryl Johnston and Pam Oliver. Sideline reporter Kristina Pink then joined the #3 team with Adam Amin and Mark Schlereth after serving the same role on Thursday Night Football. Elsewhere, Johnston's spot with Myers on the #5 team was filled in by Robert Smith, and Shannon Spake replaced Lindsay Czarniak on the #4 team with Kenny Albert and Jonathan Vilma. During Week 6, Fox College Football play-by-play voice Noah Eagle filled in for Amin on the #3 team while the latter worked the 2022 National League Division Series, while Brandon Gaudin filled Davis' role. In Weeks 7, 8 and 9, Amin temporarily replaced Davis on the #2 team while Myers moved to the #3 team and Gaudin took his place on the #5 team. During this period, Burkhardt continued to call NFL games, but Matt Vasgersian filled in for him in the studio during MLB postseason coverage. In Week 17, Jason Benetti made his NFL on Fox debut calling the Arizona Cardinals–Atlanta Falcons game with Brady Quinn.

Rules analyst Mike Pereira missed the 2023 season due to injury, leaving Dean Blandino as the sole rules analyst for the duration of the season. Pereira returned in 2024, again splitting duties with Blandino, though he mainly appears on screen with Burkhardt's team.

Brady officially joined the NFL on Fox in 2024, serving as the #1 analyst with Burkhardt. Olsen was then bumped to the #2 analyst role with Davis. Johnston is then paired with Kugler on the #5 team, while Sanchez moved to the #3 pairing with Amin. Mark Schlereth replaced Robert Smith on the #6 team with Myers, and Megan Olivi replaced the departing Shannon Spake on the #4 team with Albert and Vilma. Jason Benetti called a few games in October due to Amin and Davis' MLB postseason assignments.

The broadcast crews for 2025 remained mostly intact, except for the sideline reporter on the Kugler–Johnston crew, as Allison Williams replaced the departing Laura Okmin. On the midnight of October 5, however, analyst Mark Sanchez was arrested in a hospital after getting stabbed and get involved in a brawl inside an Indianapolis bar. Sanchez had been assigned to do analysis for the Las Vegas Raiders–Indianapolis Colts Week 5 game with Chris Myers, but his spot on the booth was ultimately filled by Brady Quinn. Mark Schlereth was later moved to Myers' group for the rest of the season. Meanwhile, Fox college football announcer Eric Collins stepped in alongside Jason Benetti while Joe Davis and Adam Amin were busy covering MLB postseason games in October. On November 6, it was reported that Drew Brees would join the NFL on Fox team as a game analyst and will be assigned to Adam Amin's crew for the rest of the season, while Fox officially cut ties with Mark Sanchez.

=== Post-game show: The OT ===
Beginning in 2005, Fox's post-game show was expanded to a half hour-long slot (regularly scheduled at 7:30 p.m. Eastern Time) and branded as The OT, competing against NBC's primetime pregame Football Night in America. The program, in addition to providing analysis of the day's NFL games, sends viewers to the remaining ongoing regional games after their main game ends (or meets the NFL's rules regarding a switch to a more compelling matchup, outside of home markets) until the end of the last game.

Fox had previously scheduled first-run sitcoms, the comedic video series The World's Funniest!, and animated series in the 7:00 p.m. hour during the NFL season, but these were often subjected to pre-emption (resulting in episodes being delayed by one week or more) due to overruns of late afternoon games into the hour, which impacted their ratings performance; as a result of the postgame show's expansion, the network generally delayed carriage of first-run programming during the first hour of Sunday prime time to midseason (one exception was the freshman sitcom Mulaney in 2014, which was pushed to the hour that November due to struggling ratings in its original 9:30 Eastern slot), primarily limited to burn-offs of already failed series.

=== Changes for 2006 ===
After the 2005 season, James Brown left Fox to return to CBS Sports, where he would become the host of the CBS network's NFL pregame show The NFL Today. On August 16, 2006, after weeks of speculation, the network officially announced that Joe Buck would take over the role as host vacated by Brown. The move also resulted in the show switching from being broadcast from a permanent Los Angeles studio to a portable studio configuration, similar to the pregame show for NASCAR on Fox, in which analysts Terry Bradshaw, Howie Long and Jimmy Johnson joined Buck at the stadium site to which Buck is assigned as play-by-play announcer for one of that week's telecasts. Curt Menefee worked all halftime shows and all postgame shows on Sundays when no doubleheader was scheduled, also from the same game site with the same analysts. Menefee hosted Fox NFL Sunday during the several weeks in October when Buck was not available; during that time, Buck called Major League Baseball postseason games, including the World Series. The pregame shows on October 15, 22 and 29 were broadcast from the Los Angeles studios; the show returned to the road on November 5.

It was also announced that weather reporter Jillian Barberie (now Jillian Reynolds) would not return for the coming season, as Barberie wished to stay at home in Los Angeles with her family. Barberie did participate in at least one of the studio shows. During the 2006 season, Chris Rose provided narrated updates highlighting other NFL games during the Fox broadcasts from the Los Angeles studio.

After the 2006 NFL season, Fox NFL Sunday returned to the Los Angeles studio throughout the entire 2007 regular season and for the two weeks of that year's postseason. Curt Menefee became the full-time host of the pregame show, while Joe Buck reverted to strictly handling play-by-play duties.

=== 2010 Monday night special ===
Fox presented a limited Monday night game between the New York Giants and Minnesota Vikings on December 13, 2010. The game had been originally scheduled to be played on the afternoon on December 12, but due to the collapse of the roof of the Metrodome early that morning due to weight from heavy snowpack, the game was moved on short notice to Ford Field in Detroit as that facility already had their full television setup still in place after a Packers–Lions game. Fox Sports had kept their cameras on in the Metrodome overnight the night before the originally scheduled game day and captured the stadium roof collapse in full detail; the video of the early morning collapse, captured at multiple angles, aired on that day's edition of Fox NFL Sunday and quickly went viral.

The game was only made available on the main Fox stations in the New York and Twin Cities media markets; owned-and-operated station WNYW and affiliate WXXA-TV aired the game in the New York City and Albany television markets, while Minneapolis–St. Paul owned-and-operated station KMSP-TV, and affiliates KXLT-TV in Rochester and KQDS-TV in Duluth, Minnesota carried the game for the Vikings' markets. The game was also carried on satellite provider DirecTV through its NFL Sunday Ticket package.

Coincidentally, this was the first game since 1992 that Brett Favre did not start an NFL game, as he was placed on the inactive list due to a shoulder injury, ending his streak of 297 consecutive regular season games; Tarvaris Jackson started in his place and subsequently Joe Webb had his first ever down in an NFL game. In addition, it was the first ever regular-season Monday night game in Ford Field.

This was the first time that either CBS or Fox produced a Monday night game that would only be broadcast in the markets of the competing teams; a similar situation would later happen on November 24, 2014, when CBS televised a Monday night game between the New York Jets and the Buffalo Bills that was relocated from Ralph Wilson Stadium to Ford Field due to a major lake-effect snowstorm that affected Western New York.

=== Long term contract extension, Thursday Night Football (2018–2022) ===
On December 14, 2011, the NFL, along with Fox, NBC and CBS announced that the league had extended rights deal with all three networks through the 2022 season. The three-network rights deal includes the continued yearly rotation of the Super Bowl between Fox, NBC and CBS, meaning that Fox would air Super Bowls XLVIII (2014), LI (2017), LIV (2020), and LVII (2023). The contract included a new "cross-flexing" policy introduced in 2014, under which a limited number of all-NFC games normally assigned to Fox may now be moved to CBS Sports, and vice versa with AFC games.

On January 31, 2018, the NFL announced that Fox had acquired the broadcast television rights to the Thursday Night Football package from 2018 through 2022. Fox would air eleven games per season in simulcast with NFL Network, replacing CBS and NBC. Fox would reportedly pay an average of $660 million per season for this package.

=== Renewal of rights, departure of Buck and Aikman, and arrival of Tom Brady (2023–2033) ===
On March 18, 2021, the NFL, along with Fox, NBC, CBS, and ABC/ESPN announced a new rights deal with all four networks through the 2033 season. Fox will maintain its NFC package of Sunday afternoon games but will no longer broadcast Thursday Night Football. The four-network rights deal also includes yearly rotation of the Super Bowl between CBS, Fox, NBC, and ABC meaning that Fox Would air Super Bowl LIX (2025), and will air Super Bowls LXIII (2029), and LXVII (2033). The contract continues the "cross-flexing" policy introduced in 2014. Fox will also have exclusive rights to Christmas Day games, when the schedule allows.

The 2022 offseason saw a major departure from Fox Sports, with Joe Buck and Troy Aikman both leaving Fox for ESPN to become the new broadcast team for Monday Night Football. At the time of Buck and Aikman's departure, Fox had not yet announced who would replace them as their main broadcast team, but it was suggested that their #2 play-by-play commentator Kevin Burkhardt may be promoted to replace Buck, with his current partner Greg Olsen possibly joining him. Eventually, on May 10, Fox announced that they had signed 7-time Super Bowl champion Tom Brady to become their lead color commentator, when he retires from playing. Brady would become the highest paid analyst in history, passing Aikman and CBS's Tony Romo, signing a massive 10-year, $375 million contract. Later, it was officially announced that Burkhardt and Olsen would replace Buck and Aikman as Fox's #1 team, with Olsen staying until Brady retires. Tom Brady has joined Fox Sports in the fall of 2024.

== Theme music ==
The iconic NFL on Fox theme music was composed by Scott Schreer; at the time of its introduction, Schreer considered the theme to be a contrast to other television sports themes, as it carried a dark, orchestral, and cinematic sound. The music was partially inspired by the opening theme of Tim Burton's 1989 Batman film; Fox Sports president David Hill had heard the theme while waiting in line for a Batman ride at an amusement park in California, and suggested to creative director George Greenberg (who had recently defected to Fox from ABC Sports) in a phone call that the overlying theme for Fox's NFL theme music should be "Batman plays football". Greenberg enlisted Schreer to compose the theme, describing Hill's request as sounding like "Batman on steroids". Schreer and his team pitched three separate songs to Greenberg and Hill, who then spliced them together into one for the final version. A more somber, piano-based version of the theme also exists. It is most often heard before commercial breaks during injury timeouts, to highlight the seriousness of the injury in question. It also replaced the regular theme music for a brief time in 2001 following the September 11 attacks.

Beginning at the 2010 National League Championship Series, the NFL on Fox theme became the official theme music for all Fox Sports broadcasts, regardless of sport. In particular, current Fox Sports president Eric Shanks believed that the special theme music it had previously used for post-season baseball was not upbeat enough, and that the change would "[give] all of our sports sort of that marquee feel and it gives us a more upbeat way to come on the air." The change also resulted in the removal of the long-time Major League Baseball on Fox theme also composed by Schreer. However, the network later began to backpedal from this standardization (including commissioning new theme music for USGA golf tournaments, and licensing the NBA on NBC theme "Roundball Rock" for college basketball broadcasts on Fox), and discontinued the use of the NFL theme music on non-football broadcasts entirely in 2020.

=== In-game music ===
In December 2010, Fox experimented with using an in-game soundtrack during a regional game between the Arizona Cardinals and Carolina Panthers. The following week on December 16, Fox publicly announced that it would also feature it during a game on December 20 between the San Francisco 49ers and Seattle Seahawks. Fox Sports president Eric Shanks revealed that CSI: Miami composer Jeff Cardoni had contributed music for the experiment, and saw potential in the concept, explaining that "just like music in movies, you have to use it at the right times. And imagine trying to score a movie the first time you're seeing it." The concept was met with mixed reaction; sports blogger Michael David Smith believed that the music was "goofy", distracting and added nothing to the game.

== Digital on-screen graphics ==
=== 1994–1996 ===
When its NFL telecasts debuted in the 1994 season, Fox's coverage featured the first "scoring bug." Originally appearing as a transparent white half-capsule-shaped graphic in the upper left corner of the screen, it displayed the score and game clock throughout the entire telecast, a first for an NFL television broadcast.

=== 1996–2000 ===
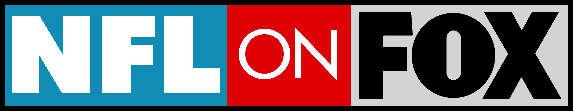
NFL on Fox logo used from 1998 to 2002.

By 1996, the graphic changed to a full-statistics panel, where down and distance, penalty, and key in-game statistics would pop in and out when necessary. The basic design of the scoring bug, which was named the "FoxBox", mimicked the version used on Fox's MLB coverage. For Fox's coverage of Super Bowl XXXIII at the end of the 1998 season, the starting lineups were shown using a virtual television. To television viewers, the effect appeared as if the end zone opened up and a giant television screen rose from the ground. The virtual television display showed video announcing the starting lineups. The virtual television effect was provided by PVI Virtual Media Services using its L-VIS virtual graphics system.

=== 2001–2002 ===
For the 2001 and 2002 seasons, Fox's NFL telecasts used the same graphics that were previously introduced on the network's NASCAR and Major League Baseball coverage. The graphics package was an updated version of the 1998 design, but the score bug changed from a compact box to a horizontal banner spanning the top of the screen, and included a scrolling graphic displaying real-time scores of other games in progress. A simple black rectangle with a shaded translucent area spanned the top of the screen from left to right, displaying the abbreviations of both teams in white. The scores were shown in white boxes next to the team. The center showed the game clock in white, to its right was the quarter ("1st QTR", "2nd QTR", etc.), and to the right of the quarter was the play clock; the NFL on Fox logo was on the far right. Starting in Super Bowl XXXVI and used full-time for the 2002 season, the white scoring boxes were re-colored to yellow. This was also the last year that the score graphic used an effect in which a team's initials flashed in its two primary colors when a team scored (for example, when the Green Bay Packers scored a touchdown during a Fox telecast, the "GB" initials and box would flash in green and gold for a few seconds as the six points for the touchdown were added, then again with the extra point). A laser sound also accompanied the effect for the guest and home teams in 2001, but was replaced with percussive sound beats in 2002 for the home team only.

=== 2003–2005 ===
NFL on Fox logo used from 2003 to 2005.

For the 2003 season, Fox's NFL coverage debuted a new graphics package.

Instead of being a large black rectangle consistently, the score bug alternated between a large black rectangle and several small, black parallelograms, and the shaded area above it was removed. Team logos were now used, in place of their abbreviations, and scores were shown in white text in black parallelograms. During the 2003 NFL playoffs, however, the logos were removed and the team abbreviations were rendered again in white lettering in the background of the team's main color.

The graphics package itself was eventually rolled out to Fox Sports' other properties in subsequent months, including NASCAR; however, Major League Baseball broadcasts continued to use the 2001 score bugs and graphics in 2004, but then began using this on-screen appearance during the MLB playoffs that year.

The score bug returned to a large black rectangle at the start of the 2004 season. The team logos returned, this time looking more "three-dimensional" in appearance and with their respective abbreviations beside the logos. Electronic eggcrate in the team's primary color was used whenever that certain team calls timeout, scores a touchdown, or a field goal. It would be shown in red whenever the team challenges a play. In addition during a touchdown or field goal, the right side of the banner would have a split flashing "light", then the words "TOUCHDOWN or FIELD GOAL (team)" in the same electronic lettering scrolling left.

During Week 11 of the 2004 season, the team logos were once again replaced with the abbreviations. First seen on the network's Major League Baseball postseason broadcasts that year, this time, they were rendered in electronic eggcrate lettering in the team's main color. When team-specific information was displayed in the banner, such as the hang time of a punt or a touchdown, the abbreviation would revert to the team's logo. During the 2005 holiday season, for the Week 15 Saturday game (between the Tampa Bay Buccaneers and New England Patriots), a new white banner, resembling a chrome finish (first introduced at the start of Fox's coverage of the 2005 World Series) debuted, with animated snow accumulating on top with an animated snowplow periodically clearing the snow from the screen. The following week, the new banner was adopted for all games, but without the snow animation. The team abbreviations became white letters against the team's main color.

=== 2006–2009 ===
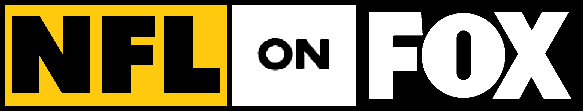
NFL on Fox logo used from 2006 to 2013.

Fox Sports again unveiled a new graphics package for its NFL coverage at the start of the 2006 season. The score bug began featuring the real-time scores as a permanent fixture on the extreme right side, while the coloring of the banner changes to the colors of the team currently possessing the ball. During playoff games and games featured on days other than the network's traditional game broadcast days or holidays (such as the Thanksgiving Day AFC/NFC game), the scoring bar instead shows either the NFL Thanksgiving logo, the NFL Divisional Playoffs/NFC Championship logo Super Bowl XLII, or a special banner with a message from Fox Sports observing whichever holiday falls during that week (for instance, confetti and a party horn with a traditional Happy New Year message).

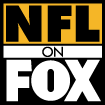
Alternate NFL on Fox logo used from 2003 to 2013.

At the beginning of the 2006 season, the virtual on-field graphic showing an arrow pointing towards the direction of advancement and the down/yardage information, which had begun use in 2004 on 3rd downs and had been expanded to most plays in 2005, began to be used on all plays from all games. This feature was later added by CBS, NBC, ESPN, and the NFL Network over the course of the next few years until all networks used it by the 2008 season. At the same time, the down/yardage information is also displayed on the scoring banner, resulting in duplicate presentation of the same information. The bar was also enhanced for high definition and is thinner than previous versions, with little translucency. The NFL on Fox logo was also repositioned to the far left instead of the far right. During high definition broadcasts, the area above the banner features a translucent slanting pattern going from left-to-right across the screen. During the 2006 preseason telecasts, the quarter was indicated by four illuminating buttons (the number of buttons that were lit indicated the quarter being played), but due to difficulties in visibility, the quarter returned to being numerically represented for the regular season. On the rare occasion during a game in which the field lines are not visible (such as those dealing with snow or rain), a small bug pops up on the bottom left side of the screen with the logo of the team that is currently in possession as well as text indicating where the ball is (e.g., Arizona-Own 41 Yard Line).

This graphics package was once again expanded to most of Fox Sports other properties in the following months; including College Football; NASCAR; and in April 2008, MLB. Fox's MLB coverage continued using the late-2005 graphics in 2007; and then in 2009, baseball broadcasts dropped this on-screen look entirely in favor of the graphics package used on FSN at the time.

Beginning on November 15, 2009 (Week 10 of the 2009 season), scores from other ongoing NFL games that appear on the right side of the banner would have an arrow indicating which team was in possession of the ball; a red arrow indicated that the team is at the red zone. Fox's NFL telecasts were the only major telecasts of the league's games to not feature timeout indicators until the 2010 season, save for the number of timeouts that each team has on the right side of the banner.

==== December 31, 2006, San Francisco/Denver game ====
There was one exception to this package for the 2006 season, as Fox had to revert to the then-current score bug and graphics package used by Fox Sports Net (and formerly the main one used by Fox Sports) for its final regular season game of the year, the San Francisco 49ers vs. the Denver Broncos on December 31, 2006, due to a blizzard (the second to occur in the span of a week) hitting Denver, preventing the usual amount of equipment for Fox's NFL coverage to arrive before the game. FSN Rocky Mountain (the FSN network that served the Denver market at the time, since replaced by AT&T SportsNet Rocky Mountain) assisted in the production of the game on short notice by providing the graphical production and other production services. In addition, the "1st & Ten" graphic lines denoting the line of scrimmage and first down line were unavailable for this broadcast. This graphic was also used in Week 5 of the 2007 season in a game between the Arizona Cardinals and St. Louis Rams.

=== 2010–2013 ===
A new graphics package for Fox's NFL telecasts debuted during an August 19, 2010, pre-season game, as Fox began to broadcast its sports programming with graphics optimized for 16:9 displays rather than the 4:3 safe area, resulting in the network asking cable and satellite providers to comply and use the #10 Active Format Description code to send out over Fox programming, which displays 16:9 content in a letterboxed format on 4:3 screens (largely on the analog affiliate feed carried by the provider), in concert with Fox News Channel and its related news productions for the Fox network also switching to full widescreen presentation. This was promoted during that first game by the Fox broadcast team as giving a "widescreen viewing experience" to standard definition viewers, using the usual examples of more video information on the screen to demonstrate the new presentation (such as two cheerleaders off to the side displayed in a widescreen shot, but cut out of a 4:3 shot).

The graphics package is an upgraded version of the 2006 design with a "much more colorful 3D look", implemented using a new infrastructure using products developed by Vizrt, which was also rolled out to other Fox Sports networks in subsequent months – NASCAR in February 2011 and then Major League Baseball in April 2011 on both the Fox network and FSN affiliates. The score banner previously used was replaced by an unconventional FoxBox-styled layout, positioned in the top left corner of the screen, with team logos and scores on either side, lights indicating timeouts on the side rims, with the play clock and quarter positioned in the center. Initially, the play clock also appeared within the center area with 10 seconds remaining, sliding the time remaining in the quarter upward. However, the play clock indicator was soon moved to the bar sliding out of the bottom to show downage.

Due to issues with some cable providers and Fox affiliates (particularly those carried by digital subchannels or low-power analog television stations) in implementing the AFD #10 widescreen mode, or for other broadcasters that still broadcast with content framed for 4:3 displays instead of defaulting to 16:9 like Fox (such as CBS and NBC, along with ESPN and NFL Network until they also switched to 16:9 with letterboxed SD feeds), feeds of Fox's NFL games have been offered with graphics positioned for 4:3 displays instead of 16:9, and in most cases, only one game per week was broadcast with exclusively 16:9 graphics.

Small tweaks were made for the 2011 season, including the timeout indicators counting upward instead of downward, and the possession indicator now appearing alongside the team that currently is in possession of the ball. Additionally, the scoreboard next to the Fox Sports bug for other ongoing NFL games was replaced by a traditional ticker; the bug was made slightly smaller and rounder as well. Special holiday animations also appeared with the banner package; digitally animated leaves fell on top of the FoxBox on Thanksgiving, while falling snow piles on top during the last two weeks of December in observance of the Christmas and holiday season, with the timeout indicators being changed in the latter instance to resemble strings of Christmas lights.

After two years of using the unconventional layout, for 2012, a more traditional FoxBox was introduced; team abbreviations (in the team's primary color) are stacked on the left side of the box, with timeout lights positioned underneath each team abbreviation, and a possession indicator to the left of it. The clock/quarter indicator is on the right side. Down and distance pops out of the bottom, while the timeout/penalty/touchdown animation is the same as in the unconventional design of the previous two seasons. Also for the 2012 season, Fox began providing play-by-play commentary of all games in Spanish on its second audio program channel. In 2013, in observance of the holiday season, Christmas lights returned to the FoxBox along the sides of the graphic, but they no longer correspond to timeouts. When a team scores, calls a timeout or gets called on a penalty, the lights change from red, green and blue to the corresponding team's color for the duration of the graphic, before returning to the normal colors.

During the 2013 NFC Championship Game, "Crank It Up" from NASCAR on Fox was used for Seattle Seahawks crowd noise.

=== 2014–2016 ===
For the 2014 season, the graphics were changed to match those that had previously been introduced on Fox Sports's Major League Baseball and NASCAR coverage. The graphics package itself is similar to the previous look, but with a more boxy appearance, and the fonts used are rounder and have less of an athletic appearance than previous packages used by Fox. The layout of the score bug is essentially a mirror image of the already-introduced MLB graphic, except that the NFL version is on the top-left of the screen; the baseball version was originally on the bottom-left (it was moved to the bottom-right beginning in 2016). Like the MLB graphic, the bug has two components: a main box and a dynamic strip. The main bug contains the team abbreviations, stacked on top of the team scores. The possession indicator is a line above the team holding the ball; timeout indicators, which are counting downward, are stacked next to the scores. This unconventional layout of displaying the scores (also used in 2010 and 2011) was only used for NFL coverage; college football and MLB coverage used the traditional layout with the team abbreviations to the left of the scores.

The dynamic strip normally shows the next down that will occur, such as "3rd Down". It changes to show down and distance and the play clock, and turns yellow if a flag is thrown. When a score occurs, the dynamic strip disappears and the main box changes to show the logo of the team scoring, along with the type of score ("TOUCHDOWN", "FIELD GOAL", "SAFETY"). For a penalty, the main box shows the logo of the offending team, while the dynamic strip turns yellow and displays the type of penalty. When a timeout is called, the dynamic strip turns to the color of the team taking the timeout and displays "Timeout", while the main box displays the team's logo over a neutral gray background. After a few seconds, the main box returns to the scores and a small gray box with the team logo appears next to the word "Timeout" in the dynamic strip.

For a review or a challenge, the dynamic strip moves from the bottom to the right side of the main box and turns red, displaying whether it is a challenge, an official review, or a scoring review. When the decision is announced, the strip expands to show the result of the review on a yellow background. After a few seconds, the strip shifts back to the bottom of the main box and if a timeout is charged on a lost challenge, the strip shows the team charged with the timeout.

For regular season games only, beginning with Week 3 of 2016, the record for each team was added to the box, making the team abbreviations of each team smaller.

Fox gradually worked elements of a new square-edged graphics package with thinner fonts into secondary situations during the 2016 season. This package (in white instead of black) was used for Fox's Super Bowl LI pregame, halftime, and post game shows, but the game broadcast itself continued to use the 2014 package. However, the translucent shading around the scoreboard was removed for the Super Bowl.

=== 2017–2019 ===
A new graphics package was introduced for the NFL on Fox, starting on August 27, 2017. After three years of using the unconventional layout from the previous package, the score bug reverted to a horizontal banner, except it's positioned across the bottom of the screen. Additionally, team names are displayed instead of their abbreviations and the clock is located towards the right of the bug and the down and distance is displayed on the far right. Also, timeout indicators are shown below the team names and the possession indicator, which was originally shown below the team's score (through Week 4 of the 2017 NFL season), is now shown above the team's score. When showing stats or player info, the score bug briefly moves to the bottom left of the screen then returns to its previous position. With this, all five of the NFL's broadcast partners (CBS, ESPN, Fox, NBC and NFL Network) had score banners across the bottom of the screen, with Fox being the last of the five to make the switch.

As for the graphics package itself, it is an upgraded version of the 2014 design and eventually, it was rolled out on almost all of Fox Sports' properties, including Fox's college football and basketball coverage on Fox and FS1, the 2017 MLB postseason and in February 2018, NASCAR on Fox.

For NFL playoff games (from 2017–present) and Thursday Night Football, which Fox picked up from 2018 to 2021, the yellow-and-black "NFL on Fox" logo on-screen and on graphics and transitions is replaced by a blue-and-white "Fox (playoff round) then the NFL logo" or "Fox|NFL Network" logo respectively. In some transitions, it is instead replaced by the full "TNF presented by Bud Light" logo. Fox also produces NFL Network exclusives on non-Fox/NBC Thursdays until 2021, on some Sunday mornings, and on late-season Saturdays; these games replace the "NFL on Fox" logo with an NFL Network logo on a black square, the size of the "NFL on Fox" logo.

=== 2020–2022 ===
During Super Bowl LIV, Fox introduced a new on-air appearance specific to its football broadcasts, replacing the previous rectangular appearance with gradient-shaded rhomboids The score bug was changed to a pod-like appearance in the bottom-center, showing only team logos, with both teams positioned in opposing directions, and the game clock and yardage shown on a stripe below the scores. Translucent strips on the bottom of the screen are used to show quarterback statistics following each play. Selected players are depicted in graphics using stylized "comic book" illustrations rather than traditional photos, and during the Super Bowl, lower thirds featured typefaces based on the Kansas City Chiefs' and San Francisco 49ers' wordmarks. These graphics took effect full-time for football telecasts on Fox after the Super Bowl, including the XFL, and the subsequent NFL and college football seasons.

Fox has sometimes lowered its score bug to a lower position on selected games in what was believed to be an attempt to frustrate the NFL RedZone channel, causing the game clock and quarter number to be obscured by the channel's own ticker. This forced the channel to overlay its own scoreboard or hide its ticker when simulcasting Fox games where this is in effect.

=== 2023–2025 ===
Fox introduced a new NFL graphics package in 2023 during Super Bowl LVII. Described as a "modernized" evolution of the prior 2020 graphics by Fox's executive producer Brad Zager, it maintained aspects of the prior package such as the pod-like score bug (which maintained a similar layout, but refreshed and made slightly bigger) and illustrated player photos. Unlike the 2020 graphics, this package was not adopted by Fox's college football coverage, which introduced their own bespoke graphics that season.

=== 2025– ===
Fox launched a new NFL graphics package in 2025 during Super Bowl LIX, which debuted full-time during the 2025 season; the new package returns to a flat design aesthetic, with the score bug and lower thirds utilizing a separated design with limited backgrounds (with the game clock in the center on a translucent black rectangle, scores and team logos displayed to its left and right with no backing at all, and quarterback statistics now shown to the left and right of the screen respectively), and a custom typeface derived from the Fox wordmark. At the Super Bowl, the bug utilized large team abbreviations that were displayed on colored rectangles in their respective colors, with timeout indicators directly beneath them; upon Fox's 2025 preseason game, the design was modified to replace the rectangles with team logos closer-resembling the previous graphics, with timeouts moved below the scores instead.

The new graphics were largely panned on social media for their basic appearance. By contrast, user experience (UX) designer John Gruber praised the graphics for their conciseness, including their deliberate lack of chrome (comparing it to the adoption of a flat design scheme by Apple's iOS 7 mobile operating system), and conveying all necessary game information while being legible at all screen sizes (including small screens such as smartphones, and larger TVs in public spaces such as bars). He argued that "[viewers] raised a ruckus only because it's so much better that what most viewers noticed is only that it's so different".

== Nielsen ratings ==
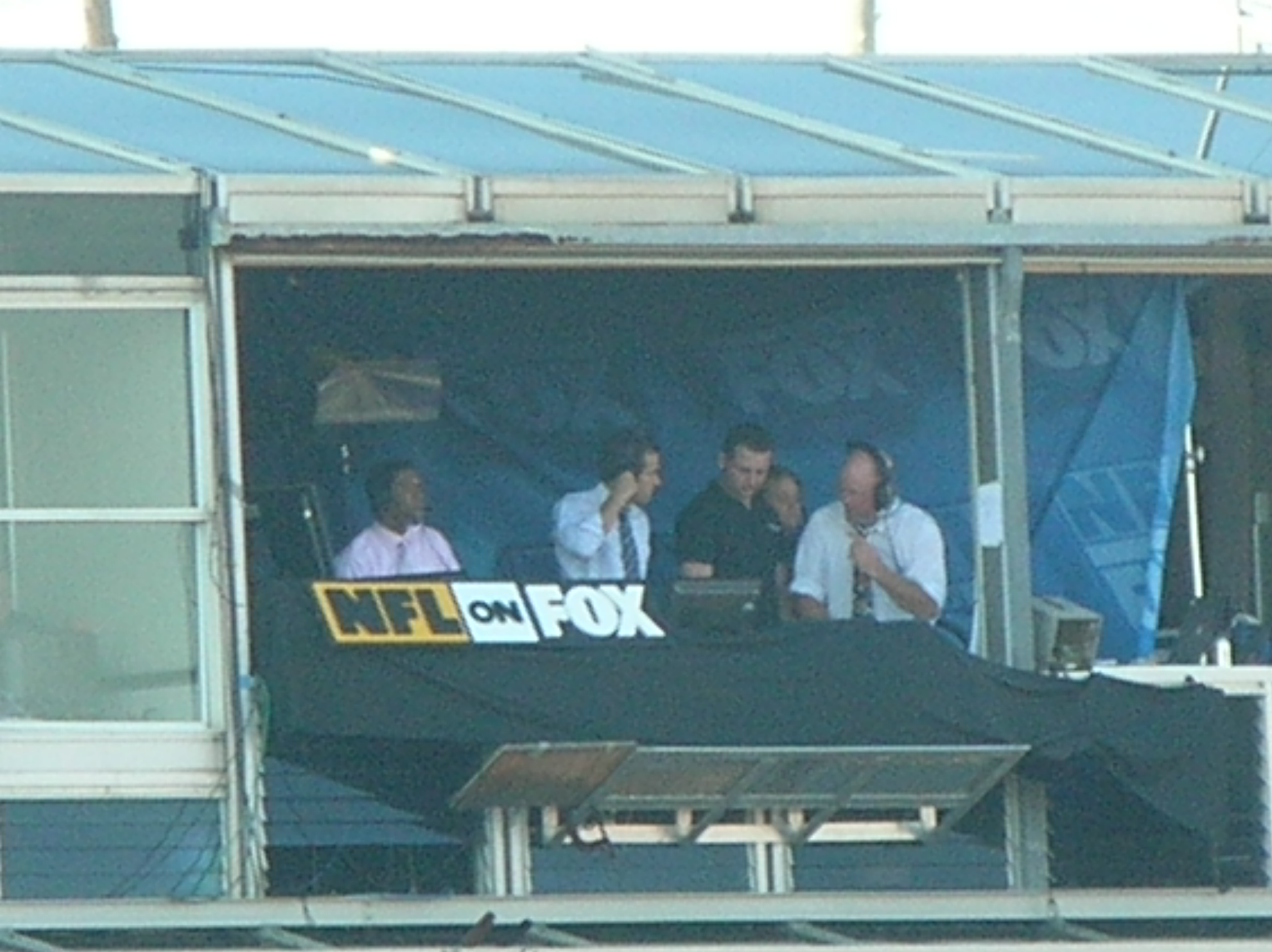
The NFL on Fox booth at Candlestick Park during a game on November 16, 2008. Matt Vasgersian and J. C. Pearson are calling the game.

Fox NFL Sunday had been the ratings leader among network pregame coverage from its debut in 1994 (as it was the only network pregame show at the time to air for one hour prior to kickoff). However, in 2006, NFL Sunday was overtaken in the ratings by CBS' The NFL Today. The swing in ratings dominance was said to be correlated with the move of original Fox NFL Sunday host James Brown back to CBS, where he had been serving as a play-by-play broadcaster before his jump to Fox in 1994.

The network's NFL game telecasts have generally posted strong viewership and continuously led Fox network's most watched programs in terms of viewership. For the 2009 season, in particular, the network's NFL games scored an average rating of 16.827 million viewers. The Detroit Lions' Thanksgiving game against the Green Bay Packers in 2025 was Fox's most-watched regular-season game ever, with 47.7 million viewers.

With an average U.S. audience of over 126 million viewers, Fox's February 9, 2025, telecast of Super Bowl LIX was the most watched Super Bowl and overall broadcast in U.S. television history, beating the previous record of 123.7 million viewers set last year for Super Bowl LVIII.

== Criticism and controversies ==
=== 2006 playoffs controversies ===
The Fox Broadcasting Company came under fire by the Parents Television Council (PTC) for showing a New Orleans Saints fan wearing a shirt which read "FUCK DA EAGLES" in Saints colors. Three days after the broadcast, the network apologized for the incident. The Saints fan, Heather Rothstein, was contacted by Maxim and was given a photo shoot that appeared in the men's magazine.

During the 2006 NFC Championship between the Chicago Bears and the New Orleans Saints at Soldier Field, in a shot taken from the overhead camera angle of the crowd, three Bears fans were seen giving an obscene gesture towards the field.

=== Mike Goldberg suspension ===
On October 14, 2014, Mike Goldberg (who mainly served as an announcer for the network's Ultimate Fighting Championship coverage at that time) voluntarily pulled himself from commentating duties for the October 19, Minnesota Vikings–Buffalo Bills game telecast, after engaging in a series of arguments, some laced with profanities, with various Twitter users. The impetus of Goldberg's response was the heavy criticism that he received on social media for committing verbal gaffes and other issues – including misidentifying and mispronouncing names of players and coaches from both teams – after commentating the October 12 game between the Vikings and Detroit Lions, which was the first time that Goldberg had called an NFL game for Fox.

A spokesperson for Fox Sports said that Goldberg "was quick to apologize for this unfortunate and regrettable situation and understands he made a mistake" and would not call any NFL games for the network for the remainder of the 2014 season, as he was originally scheduled to conduct only those two games (Tim Brando crossed over from Fox College Football to fill in for Goldberg on the Vikings-Bills broadcast). Goldberg tweeted that the decision was mutually agreed upon between him and Fox Sports management, stating that he did not want to be "a distraction on the upcoming broadcast".

== Other professional football coverage ==
=== XFL ===
In 2019, Fox Sports reached an agreement with the XFL to air 21 games during the 2020 XFL season, as well as one semifinal. Two games were scheduled for Thursday night primetime windows on Fox. Curt Menefee (host of Fox NFL Sunday) and Joel Klatt (lead analyst for Fox's Big Noon Saturday) served as Fox's lead XFL broadcast team in 2020. Fox also auditioned Greg Olsen for the second XFL broadcast team in October 2019 by having him call an NFL game during his bye week from the Carolina Panthers and eventually hired him as color commentator for the second broadcast team, which features Kevin Burkhardt on play-by-play. Brock Huard was the sideline reporter for Fox's lead broadcast while Jenny Taft covered the sidelines for their second broadcast team. In week 5, New Orleans Saints star Cameron Jordan served as a guest sideline reporter for Fox's lead broadcast. On March 12, 2020, amid the COVID-19 pandemic in the United States, the XFL announced that the league would be cancelling the rest of the season.

=== The Spring League ===
In 2020, Fox Sports announced an agreement to televise The Spring League. As part of the agreement, Fox also had the ability to acquire a future minority equity stake in TSL. Fox Sports 1 aired all 8 Fox Sports games during the 2020 The Spring League Fall season, including the championship game. Alex Faust and Jordan Palmer served as the lead broadcast for the TSL in 2020. Joel Klatt also did color commentary for select games.

During the 2021 The Spring League season, Fox expanded its coverage to include every game across Fox, FS1 and FS2. Fox aired 7 games, including the championship. Fox used a team of play-by-play and color commentators for its coverage. Play-by-play talent included Kevin Kugler, Brandon Gaudin, Alex Faust, and Noah Eagle. Color talent included Joel Klatt, Brock Huard, Mark Helfrich, Petros Papadakis, and Jordan Palmer. The championship game averaged 418,000 viewers on Fox.

=== United States Football League ===
In June 2021, Fox became the minority owner in the United States Football League (USFL), the spiritual successor to The Spring League. In 2022, Fox aired 15 games, including one semifinal and the championship. The opening game was broadcast on April 16, 2022, on both Fox and NBC. Fox produced the game and NBC produced all studio coverage. It was the first football game to be simulcast across two major American broadcast networks since the 2007 New England Patriots–New York Giants game. Like for its coverage of the XFL, Curt Menefee and Joel Klatt served as the lead broadcast team for the USFL on Fox. Kevin Kugler and Mark Sanchez served as the second broadcast team. Brock Huard reported from the sidelines during select games. Fox also aired a 13-part documentary series called "United by Football: A Season in the USFL" which produced by the league, NFL Films and Fox Sports. The series followed the USFL players and coaches "behind-the-scenes" during the 2022 season. The 2022 championship averaged 1.8 million viewers on Fox.

In 2023, Fox aired 18 games, including one semifinal. Commentary crews remained largely the same, though Devin Gardner joined Fox as a color commentator for select games.

=== United Football League ===
Following the merger of the XFL and USFL into the UFL, the UFL announced that Fox Sports had acquired partial television rights to the league along with ESPN and ABC.

For the 2024 UFL season, Fox will air 19 regular season games (three weeks will have two games distributed regionally), one division championship, and the championship game.

== See also ==
- NFL on CBS
- NBC Sunday Night Football
- Monday Night Football
- Fox NFL Sunday
- Fox NFL Kickoff
- Thursday Night Football

Records
| Preceded by CBS | National Football Conference broadcaster 1994–present | Succeeded by Incumbent |
| Preceded by CBS (shared with NBC (2016–2017)) | NFL Thursday Night Football broadcaster (with NFL Network); 2018–2021 | Succeeded by Prime Video |
