= Gameday =

Gameday (or GameDay) may refer to:

- College GameDay (disambiguation), several shows produced by ESPN
- GameDay (software)

== See also ==
- Game day (disambiguation)
