= Stan Honey =

American yachtsman (born 1955)

Stan Honey (born April 8, 1955) is an American professional offshore navigator with world sailing records and a businessman who founded Etak and Sportvision.

Honey's track record as a navigator includes a victory in the 2005-06 Volvo Ocean Race onboard ABN Amro I and eleven wins in Transpac races across the Pacific Ocean. He has held the speed record for sailing around the World, and across the Atlantic and Pacific Oceans. He was named U.S. Sailing's 2010 Rolex Yachtsman of the Year for his critical role in cutting the nonstop circumnavigation record to 48 days aboard the 103-foot French trimaran Groupama 3.

As a businessman, he is the father of consumer on-screen navigation, including the automotive navigation systems used around the world, with his company Etak. The initial start-up funding came from Nolan Bushnell, famous for starting Atari and Chuck E. Cheese's Pizza Time Theatre.

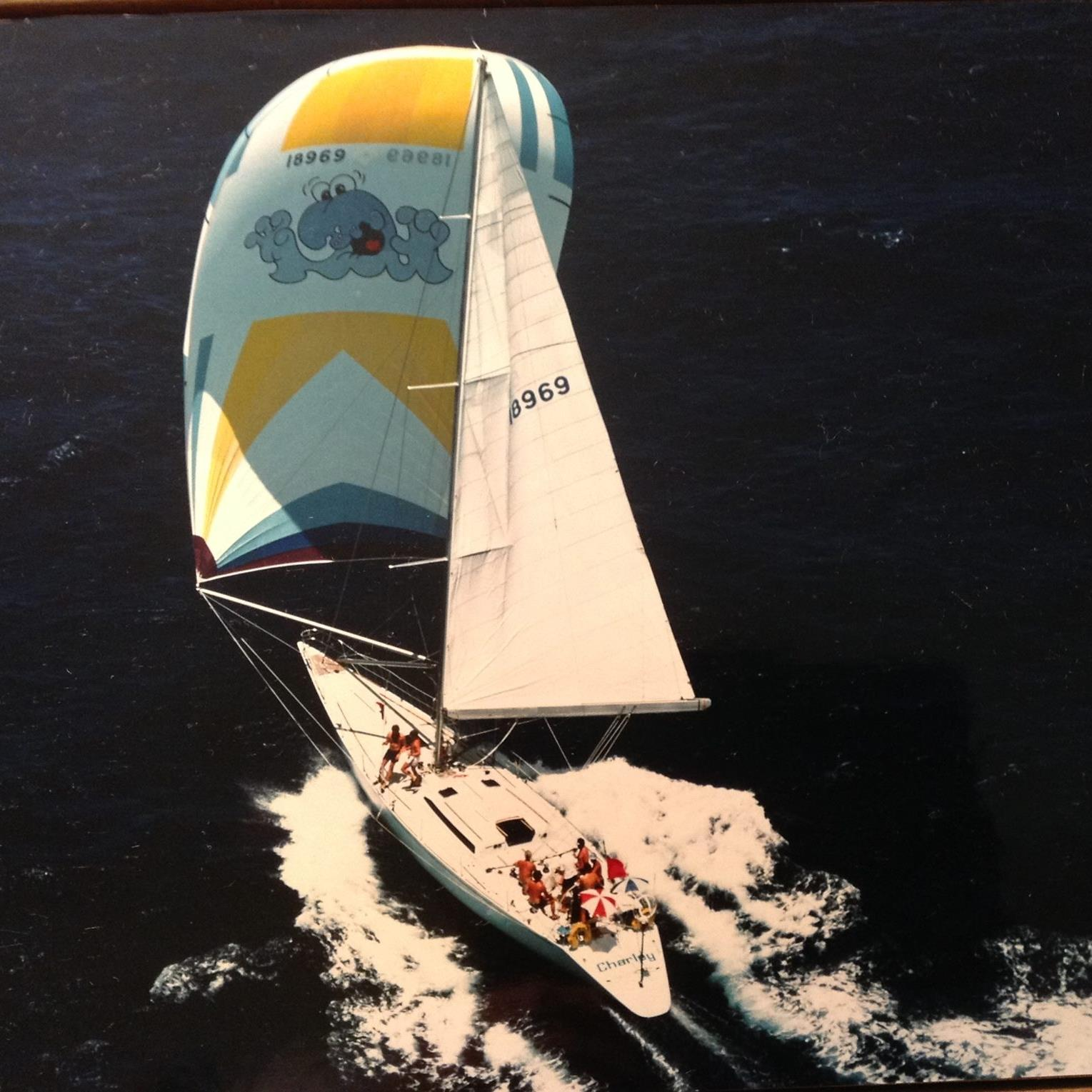
Nolan Bushnell's 67ft ULDB Charley (Ron Holland design, 1983)

"[Co-founder Stan Honey] was doing military-related research at SRI International in 1983 when he sailed with Pong inventor and Atari founder Nolan Bushnell to victory in a Transpac race aboard 'Charley', Bushnell's new 67ft racing yacht. Bushnell was impressed with Honey's navigational electronics and asked whether he had any other ideas. Honey suggested a car navigation system. Bushnell gave him $500,000 in seed money, and digital-mapping firm Etak (named after a Polynesian term for navigation) was born."

While at SRI, he earned his master's degree in electrical engineering at Stanford University.

With his company Sportvision, he invented the technology that displays the first-down line on your TV in American football, the "glowing" hockey pucks, baseball strikes, and the real-time "player cards" in international football (soccer).

He was the head sailing coach and selection judge in Disney's movie Morning Light.

Stan Honey was the Director of Technology for the 34th America's Cup. He and his team won The George Wensel Technical Achievement Award for America's Cup LiveLine.

Honey was inducted into the National Sailing Hall of Fame in 2012.

He is married to Sally Lindsay Honey, a two-time US Yachtswoman of the Year.

In 2016, Honey was the navigator on board the 100 foot supermaxi Comanche during her successful attempt at breaking the monohull Trans-Atlantic speed record. His unprecedented strategy of riding a single system ahead of a storm for the whole crossing is considered key to its success, taking only 5 days, 14 hours.

In 2022 Sally and Stan won the 52nd edition of the Newport Bermuda Race in their Cal 40, Illusion. Thereby winning the St. David's Lighthouse trophy with 108 boats competing over the 635 nautical mile course.
