= David W. Crain =

American engineer

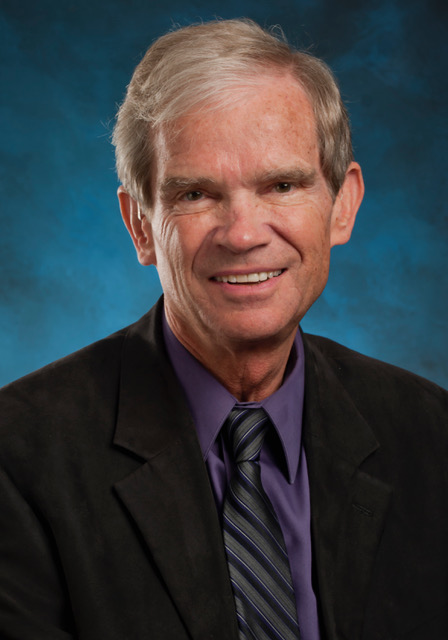
- Crain in 2018
- Born: November 24, 1946 (age 79); Monterey Park, California
- Education: University of Southern California (BS, MS, PhD)
- Spouse: Sheila Crain (m. 1967)
- Children: 2

David W. Crain (born 1946) is an American engineer who is known for conceiving and patenting the "1st and Ten" graphical overlay system used in sports television broadcasts.

== Early life and education ==
Crain was born in 1946 in California. He graduated from Don Bosco Technical Institute in Rosemead, California. He earned a Bachelor of Science in physics (1968), a Master of Science in materials science (1971), and a Ph.D. in materials science (1976) from the University of Southern California (USC). His doctoral dissertation, titled "Charge Motion in the Variable Threshold Memory Transistor," focused on the development of flash memory transistors. His 1976 paper, titled "Charge Centroid and Trapping Model for MNOS Structures" builds a physical model that explains how and where electrons get trapped inside metal nitride oxide silicon (MNOS) non‑volatile memory devices.

== Career ==
Crain began his career by joining the United States Naval Oceans System Command in 1968 in San Diego, California, where he worked on the development of microelectronics for anti-submarine warfare systems. During his tenure, he patented the technology that later evolved into the "1st and Ten" system commonly referred to as the football "yellow first-down line". Crain was awarded US Patent 4084184 "TV Object Locator and Image Identifier" on April 11, 1978. The patent was conceived as a calibration method for two-dimensional depiction of three-dimensional space, inspired by well-established downrange targeting techniques like sonar and radar. The invention, described below, was not utilized in broadcasts until ESPN and SportVision implemented it years later.

Crain transitioned to Sempra in 1976 where he rose to Director of Corporate Strategy and later joined Fluor Corporation in 1996 as Director of Markets and Strategies. He was active in MESA, a California organization supporting underserved and underrepresented students pursuing calculus-based Science, Technology, Engineering and Mathematics (STEM) and served as Statewide Industry Advisory Board Chairman from 1987 to 1989. In 1999, he co-founded the Association for Strategic Planning and served as its president. He was inducted into the Hall of Fame of the reincorporated International Association for Strategic Professionals in 2009.

Crain has served as a professor at Pepperdine Graziadio Business School, Cal Poly Pomona, and the University of Southern California.

== "1st and Ten" Invention ==
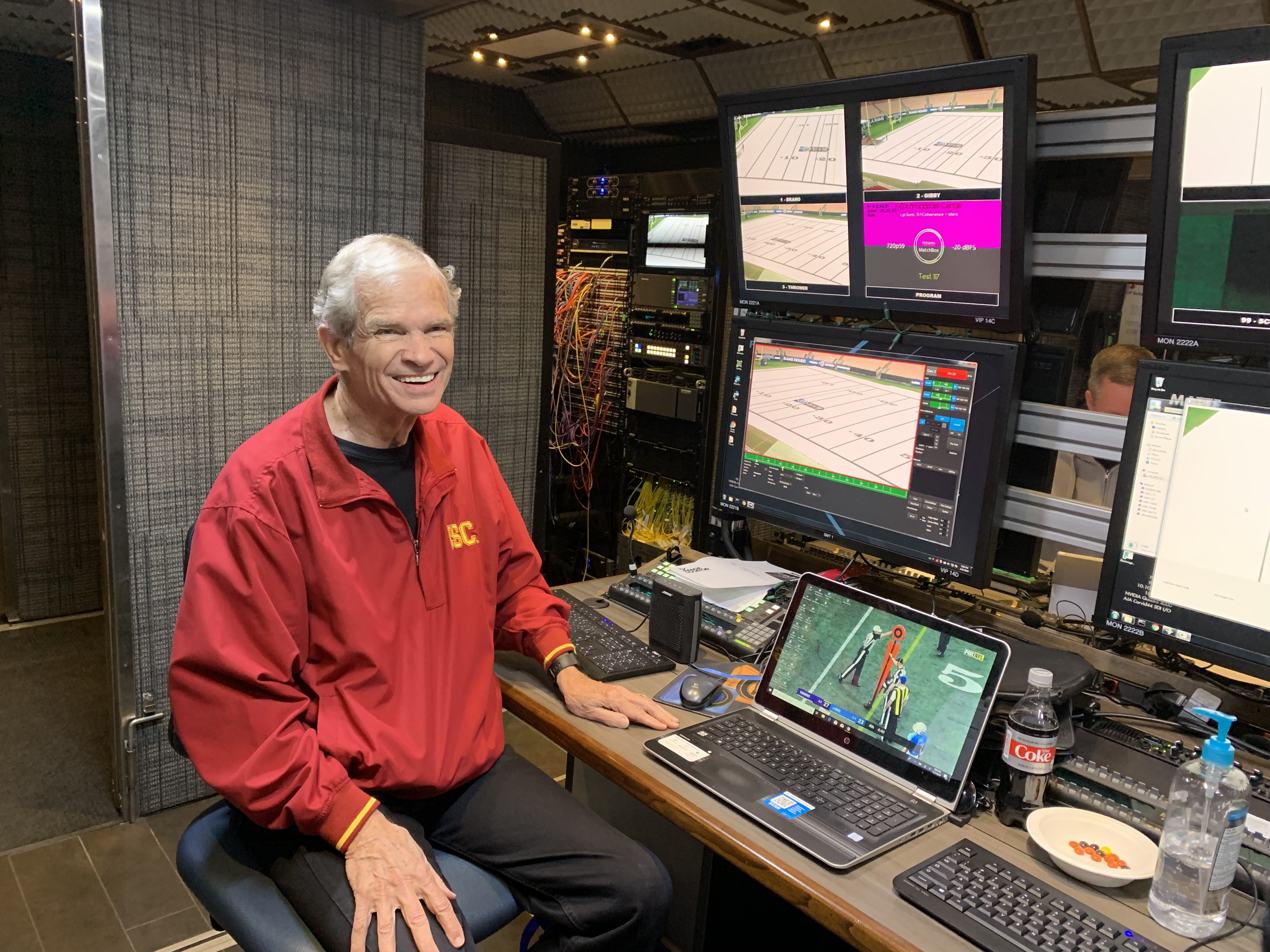
Crain in front of a 2012 implementation of the system envisioned in his original patent.

Crain was awarded US Patent 4084184 "TV Object Locator and Image Identifier" on April 11, 1978. One use of the technology was to create on-field markings to allow TV viewers to identify the distance needed to achieve a first down in televised football games. It did so by inserting graphical elements on the field of play as if they were physically present. He presented the concept to Roone Arledge and Roger Goodman of ABC News and Sports and to Robert T. McKinley of the CBS Technology Center. At the time, the broadcast industry was not ready to use Crain's invention. ABC producers told Crain, “To superimpose graphics over a live play is taboo at ABC and probably in the broadcast industry. Have you ever been in an NFL sound truck during a live telecast? It is sheer chaos in there and we don’t need some computer brought in to add confusion. Too much cost, too much equipment, too many cameras, for something that may be only used 4 times a game." The invention was brought to market 20 years later and was introduced on ESPN football telecasts in 1998 when signal processing technology had the speed to keep up with insertion of dynamic objects in the field of view. It is now widely used in network sports broadcasts of all types and is considered the foundation technology for augmented reality (AR) video applications. Table 1 below lists the top 31 patents issued between 1978 and 2019 that reference Crain’s original invention.

Table 1. Top Inventions Citing Crain's Patent
| Patent Number | Date Awarded | Patent Name | Inventor |
|---|---|---|---|
| US 4084184 A | 4/11/1978 | TV Object locator and image identifier | Crain; David W. |
| US 4490742 A | 12/25/1984 | Encoding apparatus for a closed-circuit television system | Wurtzinger; Richard E. |
| US 4855820 A | 8/8/1989 | Down hole video tool apparatus and method for visual well bore recording | Barbour; Joel |
| US 4928175 A | 5/22/1990 | Method for the three-dimensional surveillance of the object space | Haggren; Henrik |
| US 4963984 A | 10/16/1990 | Optical projection camera alignment system and method | Womack; Kenneth H. |
| US 4985779 A | 1/15/1991 | Improved method and apparatus for generating halftone images | Gall; Winrich |
| US 5892554 A | 4/6/1999 | System and method for inserting static and dynamic images into a live video broadcast | DiCicco; Darrell S. et al. |
| US 5808695 A | 9/15/1998 | Method of tracking scene motion for live video insertion systems | Rosser; Roy J. et al. |
| US 5912700 A | 6/15/1999 | System for enhancing the television presentation of an object at a sporting event | Honey; Stanley K. et al. |
| US 5672820 A | 9/30/1997 | Object location identification system for providing location data of an object being pointed at by a pointing device | Rossi; John H. et al. |
| US 5917553 A | 6/29/1999 | Method and apparatus for enhancing the broadcast of a live event | Honey; Stanley K. et al. |
| US 6252632 B1 | 6/26/2001 | System for enhancing a video presentation | Cavallaro; Richard H. |
| US 5953077 A | 9/14/1999 | System for displaying an object that is not visible to a camera | Honey; Stanley K. et al. |
| US 6195122 B1 | 2/27/2001 | Spatial referenced photography | Vincent; Robert |
| US 6266100 B1 | 7/24/2001 | System for enhancing a video presentation of a live event | Gloudemans; James R. et al. |
| US 6229550 B1 | 5/8/2001 | Blending a graphic | Gloudemans; James R. et al. |
| US 6100925 A | 8/8/2000 | Image insertion in video streams using a combination of physical sensors and pattern recognition | Rosser; Roy J. et al. |
| US 6466275 B1 | 10/15/2002 | Enhancing a video of an event at a remote location using data acquired at the event | Honey; Stanley K. et al. |
| US 7075556 B1 | 7/11/2006 | Telestrator system | Meier; Kevin R. et al. |
| US 6965397 B1 | 11/15/2005 | Measuring camera attitude | Honey; Stanley K. et al. |
| US 7230653 B1 | 6/12/2007 | Method and apparatus for real time insertion of images into video | Overton; Kenneth J. et al. |
| US 6909438 B1 | 6/21/2005 | Video compositor | White; Marvin S. et al. |
| US 7206434 B2 | 4/17/2007 | Method and system for measurement of the duration an area is included in an image stream | Overton; Kenneth J. et al. |
| US 7341530 B2 | 3/11/2008 | Virtual strike zone | Cavallaro; Richard H. et al. |
| US 20050001852 A1 | 1/6/2005 | System and method for inserting content into an image sequence | Dengler, John D. et al. |
| US 8335345 B2 | 12/18/2012 | Tracking an object with multiple asynchronous cameras | White; Marvin S. et al. |
| US 8218002 B2 | 7/10/2012 | Method and apparatus providing computer generated images over a network with a point of view corresponding to images acquired during navigation of an imaging device | Maguire, Jr.; Francis J. |
| US 8330812 B2 | 12/11/2012 | Method and apparatus for producing and storing, on a resultant non-transitory storage medium, computer generated (CG) video in correspondence with images acquired by an image acquisition device tracked in motion with respect to a 3D reference frame | Maguire, Jr.; Francis J. |
| US 8786415 B2 | 7/22/2014 | Tracking system using proximity and/or presence | Cavallaro; Richard H. et al. |
| US 9215383 B2 | 12/15/2015 | System for enhancing video from a mobile camera | Milnes; Kenneth A. et al. |
| US RE45062 E | 8/5/2014 | Apparatus for inducing attitudinal head movements for passive virtual reality | Maguire, Jr.; Francis J. |
| US 10290119 B2 | 5/14/2019 | Multi view camera registration | White; Marvin S. et al. |
