= 1st & Ten (graphics system) =

Computer system that inserts graphics into televised coverage of American football

The 1st and Ten line displays the yard line needed for a first down during an ESPN Sunday Night Football broadcast.

1st & Ten is a computer system that augments televised coverage of American football by inserting graphical elements on the field of play as if they were physically present; the inserted element stays fixed within the coordinates of the playing field and obeys the visual rules of foreground objects occluding background objects. Developed by Sportvision and PVI Virtual Media Services, it is best known for generating and displaying a yellow first down line over a live broadcast of a football game—making it easier for viewers to follow play on the field. The line is not physically present on the field and is seen only by the television audience.

1st & Ten is sometimes used generically to refer to the class of systems capable of adding first down lines and similar visual elements and not just the Sportvision system. However, PVI's competing system is more accurately named L-VIS, for Live Video Insertion System.

Over time, usage has evolved. Some football broadcasts change the color of the line from yellow to red on 4th down, or show a second computer-generated line (usually blue in color) that marks the line of scrimmage. Lines can also be projected to show other types of field position, including markings for the red zone and the optimum maximum distance for a placekicker's statistical field goal range. In extreme weather situations, an entire virtual field with yard and boundary markers can be projected onto the field in order to allow league officials, broadcasters and viewers some way to follow action when all field markings are obscured by snow, fog or mud.

The system makes use of a combination of motion sensors mounted on the broadcast cameras to record what they are viewing, and/or the use of match moving computer graphics technology and an enhanced version of chroma key or "green screen" technology.

== History and development ==
The idea of creating an on-field marker to help TV viewers identify first down distances was conceived and patented in 1978 by Naval Oceans System Command engineer David W. Crain, who presented the concept to Roone Arledge and Roger Goodman of ABC News and Sports and to the CBS Technology Center. At the time, both decided the broadcast industry was not ready to use Crain's invention.

In 1998, ESPN programmer Gary Morgenstern and others revived the idea. ESPN's NFL coordinating producer, Fred Gaudelli, was tasked with overseeing an implementation for his network. The 1st & Ten line was first broadcast by Sportvision, a private company, during ESPN's coverage of a Cincinnati Bengals-Baltimore Ravens game on September 27, 1998. A few weeks later, on Thanksgiving Day in 1998, Princeton Video Image (PVI) aired its version of the virtual yellow down line on a CBS broadcast of a Pittsburgh Steelers–Detroit Lions game. Four years later, SportsMEDIA introduced a third version during NBC coverage of a Notre Dame game.

The rivalry between PVI and Sportvision began with a collaboration. In July 1995, PVI had successfully used its L-VIS (Live Video Insertion System) match moving technology to broadcast virtual advertising behind the home plate on a local broadcast of a Trenton Thunder baseball game. In January 1996, Roy Rosser, director of special projects at PVI, saw Sportvision's FoxTrax puck on the broadcast of the 1996 NHL All-Star Game and realized that a combination of L-VIS and FoxTrax would allow virtual insertions in a wider range of situations than either could do on its own, given the power of affordable computers. He contacted Stan Honey, CTO at Sportvision, and the two companies undertook a joint demonstration of their combined technologies during the 1996 World Series between the Atlanta Braves and the New York Yankees at the Atlanta–Fulton County Stadium. The test was not a success and the two companies parted ways, each developing complementary systems that were eventually used to broadcast Sportvision's "First and Ten" line and PVI's "Yellow Down Line". In October 1999, SportVision sued PVI alleging that PVI's virtual signage, first down line and other products infringed Fox/Sportvision patents. In August 2001, PVI counterclaimed against Sportvision in the federal court action, alleging that Sportvision's virtual strike zone and virtual signage products infringed a PVI patent. In 2002, the companies settled the lawsuits out of court through a cross-licensing deal.

== Before the game ==
Each football field has a unique crown and contour and is not perfectly flat in order to facilitate drainage, so a 3D model is made of the field prior to the game. Due to the low amount of change throughout a football season, this 3D model is usually only generated once a season at most. It also has a unique color palette, typically various shades of green, depending on the type of surface (i.e. real or artificial grass) and the weather (e.g. bright, shady or even snowing). In addition, after cameras are set up, the position of the camera relative to the field is established to be used in conjunction with the previously created 3D model of the field.

== Cameras ==
There are usually a number of cameras shooting the field, but typically only three or four main cameras are used for an American football broadcast (one on the fifty-yard line, and one on each twenty-yard line, with most high profile games also having a Skycam, as described below). The cameras with video that will be used with the graphics system have electronic encoders within parts of the camera assembly (in the lens and the moving platform the camera sits on, sometimes called a "panhead") that monitor how the camera is used during the game (pan, tilt, zoom, focus and extender). The encoders transmit that info live 30 or more times per second to the broadcaster's production truck, where it is processed by Sportvision computers (typically one for each camera). A camera with this type of extra hardware is usually called an "instrumented" camera. This information helps keep the yellow 1st & ten line in the proper place without being distorted whenever the camera follows the players or the ball.

== See also ==
- FoxTrax
- Match moving
- L-VIS
