= Sportvision =

American sports technology company

Sportvision was a private company, launched in January 1998, that provided various television viewing enhancements to a number of different professional sporting events. They worked with NFL, NBA, NASCAR, NHL, MLB, PGA and college football broadcasts. Sportvision was co-founded by CEO Bill Squadron, CTO Stan Honey and COO Jerry Gepner, who had all worked together at Fox Sports and its parent company, News Corporation.

The Emmy-award winning technology company introduced numerous groundbreaking innovations for sports broadcast, including the 1st & Ten yellow line for football and the K Zone pitch-tracking system for baseball, both done with ESPN. Sportvision's inventions paved the way for increased use of technology across sports and sports media.

By way of background, in 1996, Rick Cavallaro, working for Stan Honey at Etak (then owned by Fox/News America) developed a way to track hockey pucks with a blue halo as seen by television viewers. It was assumed at that time that viewers had a hard time keeping track of the puck. Released as the FoxTrax puck, it was not a success but led to the 1998 formation of the Sportvision company and later that year the development of the 1st & Ten computer system, which generates and displays the yellow first down line that a TV viewer sees during a live football broadcast. The system became a major hit with television viewers when used during a broadcast of the Super Bowl. It has since become part of all standard American professional and college football and Canadian pro football broadcasts.

Another popular Sportvision product is seen in broadcasts of NASCAR races. It is called RACEf/x, and creates virtual flags above the cars to make them easier to follow by the viewers.

Sportvision also created the PITCHf/x system used by Major League Baseball to provide pitch data to users of MLB.com GameDay and viewers of Fox, Fox Sports Net, Rogers Sports Net and TBS, until its replacement by Statcast in 2017.

The latest attempt for hockey was tested for deployment during the 2015 NHL All-Star weekend. The new system used computer chips to standardize and increase the volume of data tracked during the course of a game.

In a deal finalized on October 4, 2016, Sportvision was acquired by SMT.

== See also ==
- SMT (media corporation)
- PVI Virtual Media Services
