= Game day =

Game day may refer to:

- "Game Day" (Awake), a television episode
- "Game Day" (Ballers), a television episode
- "Game Day" (Matlock), a television episode
- "Game Day" (Ozark), a television episode
- "Game Day" (The Wire), a television episode
- "Game Day", an episode of the TV series Pajanimals
- Game Day, a 1999 film starring Richard Lewis
- Game Day, a 2005 children's book by Ronde Barber and Tiki Barber
- AFL Game Day, an Australian television program

== See also ==
- Gameday (disambiguation)
