= PVI Virtual Media Services =

- Founded: 1990
- Parent: ESPN

PVI Virtual Media Services is one of the companies behind the virtual yellow-down-line shown on television broadcasts of American football games in the United States and Canada. Founded in 1990 as Princeton Electronic Billboard, PVI Virtual Media Services was a wholly owned subsidiary of Cablevision Systems Corporation (NYSE: CVC) with a research and operations facility in Lawrenceville, NJ before being acquired by ESPN in December, 2010.

== Services ==
L-VIS displays a virtual TV screen showing the Defensive Line Up during the Fox broadcast of Super Bowl XXXIII.

The company pioneered the vision-based, match moving technology that allows the virtual insertion of images and video into broadcast video signals in real time, i.e., while the program is being broadcast. In addition to the virtual yellow down line, the technology has been used to place virtual advertising in broadcasts of soccer, baseball, ice hockey games and, more controversially, on some TV news shows, including the CBS 2000 New Year's Eve show when an NBC logo behind Dan Rather in Times Square, NY, was covered over with a virtual CBS logo.

Originally marketed as L-VIS (Live Video Insertion System), their systems are now called inVU systems to emphasize their use of pattern recognition of images, and that motion sensors are not required on the broadcast cameras that the system is working with.

== History ==
The company was founded as Princeton Electronic Billboard (PEB) in 1990 by Roy Rosser and Brown Williams, based on patents on match moving enhancements filed by Roy Rosser. Brown Williams had been a senior manager at David Sarnoff Research Center (now part of SRI International) and knew that they had developed advanced, vision based pattern recognition and tracking technology for various U.S. defense agencies. A contract was placed with Sarnoff to develop a prototype that was delivered in early 1994. Although the prototype showed great promise in the laboratory, it proved wholly inadequate when tried out at the Baltimore Orioles 1994 season opener.

Roy Rosser and a small team of programmers and consultants spent the next 18 months re-engineering the system, inventing novel methods and algorithms of pattern recognition and tracking so that the match making could work to the standards required by TV broadcasters under the variable conditions of a real game using the computing power then available. In July 1995, the system was first used to place virtual advertising behind home plate on a cable broadcast of a Trenton Thunders game. Later in the year, the L-VIS system was used to provide Parmalat virtual advertising in the center-circle of a soccer pitch during the Parmalat Cup played at the NJ Meadowlands Stadium. In April 1996, the San Francisco Giants became the first Major League Baseball team to regularly use the L-VIS system for virtual insertions for their home games at Candlestick Park.

In March 2002, PVI acquired Israeli company SciDel Technologies, from its founders and major shareholder Scitex Corporation. SciDel developed a technology to insert electronic virtual advertisements into live and taped televised sporting events, which it sold as a managed service in the European market.

On April 16, 2004, PVI aired Strike Zone, High Home Cam, and Ball Tracer on Fox's prime time broadcast of a New York Yankees–Boston Red Sox game. However, Fox retired those three graphics after the prime time telecast.

In December 2010, PVI was acquired by ESPN. The R&D team moved from the old Lawrenceville NJ office to a new office building near the Hamilton train station. The team continued the effort of inserting virtual graphics in sports broadcasting. College Football, Basketball, Baseball, NBA production at ESPN uses vMagic for many different effects.

On July 20, 2017, ESPN announces to the PVI team that their jobs are eliminated and the office is closed.

== See also ==
- Sportvision
