= SMT (media company) =

American broadcasting company

- Formerly: SportsMEDIA Technology Corporation
- Type: Private
- Industry: Broadcast, Digital distribution, Event support
- Founded: 1985
- Founder: Gerard J. Hall
- Number of locations: Durham, North Carolina Fremont, California Jacksonville, Florida Munich, Germany Toronto, Canada
- Products: Computer software, computer hardware
- Number of employees: 750
- Website: http://www.smt.com

SMT (formerly Sports MEDIA Technology Corporation) is a business that specializes in graphics for broadcasts, webcasts and live events in sports and entertainment. They were the first company to employ real-time scoring and wireless data systems on television. SMT’s customers include broadcasting television networks, regional and specialty networks and sports governing bodies. In 2012 it acquired IDS (Information and Display Systems) as a division of the company to provide scoring, results and statistics on-site for live events. In 2016, SMT acquired Chicago-based rival Sportvision.

== History ==
SMT was founded in 1985 by Gerard J. Hall after developing the first real-time scoring and wireless data delivery system for the PGA Tour to replace walkie-talkie communication used at the time. He developed a way to interface real-time scoring with TV production using personal computers.

Hall provided this interface from 1988 to 1991 for NBC Sports’ coverage of PGA Tour telecasts. In June 1990, he formally incorporated what was then known as SportsMEDIA Technology Corporation with an eye toward offering TV interface technology to other sports television broadcasters. Shortly thereafter, the company signed an exclusive four-year agreement with ESPN to provide interface TV graphics services for many live sporting events. The scoring system used by SportsMEDIA became modified during this period to include compiling statistics based on performance or event data of a sports or performance event or activity. The system received a U.S. patent in 1996.

Following the end of the exclusive ESPN contract, Hall led SportsMEDIA Technology into the design and development of the first clock-and-score graphic on TV, the SportsMEDIA Autograph device. It became known as the Fox Box, and it set constant on-air graphic scoreboards as a standard operating procedure for all sports telecasts.

By the late 1990s, SportsMEDIA Technology began providing statistics for CBS Sports announcers to use every year during broadcasts of the NCAA Final Four basketball tournament, as well as shot clocks, game clocks and scores that appear on screen.

By 2000, the company began providing graphics, statistics, world feeds and video enhancements to the annual Super Bowl broadcast. For Super Bowl XLVII in 2013, six cameras were calibrated with the first down line by SMT.

In the early 2000s, SportsMEDIA Technology moved into the virtual graphics realm with what it branded as “Sports Media Augmented Reality Technology” (SMART). Its first-down line product, called SMART Virtual Insertion Publisher (VIP), was used first by NBC Sports in 2003 for Notre Dame games to indicate where a football team had to cross on a field in order to score a first down. SMART VIP provided the virtual first-down line for Monday Night Football coverage by ABC Sports in 2004.

In September 2010, SportsMEDIA Technology raised $12.5 million in outside capital to finance its expansion. Vicente Capital Partners, a Los Angeles-based private equity firm, received a minority ownership stake in the business as part of the deal.

SportsMEDIA Technology changed its name to SMT in January 2011. The company said the name change reflected its expansion into other sectors besides sports, such as entertainment, education and medicine.

Looking for an acquisition that would add new products and services to its current product mix and help it expand its market reach, SMT acquired Jacksonville, Fla.-based Information and Display Systems, LLC, also known as IDS, in February 2012, in a deal that doubled the size of SMT. IDS's scoring and statistics systems and display boards and systems are used at such events as Wimbledon, the US Open, the French Open and the Australian Open. As part of the deal, SMT operated IDS as a wholly owned business unit of SMT, while Gerard J. Hall became CEO of both companies and remained as president of SMT.

SMT launched a company called (n+1) design studio in 2013 to focus on motion graphic design and branding. Clients include Revolt TV, Food Network, Fantasy Sports Network, CrossFit Games, NASCAR and the Women’s Tennis Association.

In a deal finalized Oct. 4, 2016, SMT acquired Sportvision, a company founded in 1998 with more than 70 patents and best known for popular on-screen graphics like the yellow “1st & Ten” line in football, the “PITCHf/x” virtual strike zone in baseball, and the “RACEf/x” pointer system in NASCAR. The transaction was unanimously approved by SMT’s board of directors and was financed through a minority-round investment by Eldridge Industries, Vicente Capital Partners, and SMT CEO Gerard J. Hall.

== Leadership ==
Gerard J. Hall serves as the founder, president and CEO of SMT. Upon graduation from Harvard University in 1981, he won the St. Andrew’s Scholarship to attend Scotland’s University of Edinburgh, where he pursued a Master of Science in computer science. Hall continued his graduate studies while teaching computer science at the University of Central Florida before leaving in 1986 to work with the Epson Computer Corporation. He established what would become SMT two years later.

Hall was a 2013 finalist for the EY Entrepreneur Of The Year Award in the Southeast, which includes Alabama, Georgia, North Carolina, South Carolina and Tennessee.

== Products ==
=== ISO Track ===
SMT's ISO Track software features an on-screen, image-based pointer graphic that identifies and tracks vehicles, horses, cyclists and athletes in real-time for events such as professional motorsports, horse racing, cycling stage races and marathons. The image-recognition tracking software does not require the traditional stationary camera and has been deployed for events including the Indianapolis 500, the Kentucky Derby, the Tour de France and the New York City Marathon.

=== GOTO Board ===
SMT’s GOTO Board (Giant On-Air Talent Operated Board) is a large touchscreen monitor and analysis tool that announcers use to stop and pause video and drag-and-drop statistics. It has been used both in sports and entertainment shows, such as MLB Network and the BET channel’s 106 & Park music video show.

=== SMART and Augmented Reality ===
SMT’s SMART system utilizes SMT’s image-stitch technology to display graphics and signage within a live virtual scene. SMART Line produces digital markers on a pitch, such as the first down marker on a football field, and SMART VIP displays on-air graphics including signage, billboards and video displays. SMART Studio produces real-time 3D virtual studios.

For NBC Sunday Night Football, SMT has provided augmented reality products such as Night Vision, which can be used on replays to highlight the on-field action by blacking out the field around the players while retaining the yard markers.

== Awards ==
- Two 2010 Silver Telly awards for video production and supporting virtual graphics
- 2010 PromaxBDA Sports Marketing Award
- 2010 Davey Award TV Sports
