= FoxTrax =

Augmented reality system

FoxTrax, also referred to as the glowing puck, is an augmented reality system that was used by Fox Sports' telecasts of the National Hockey League (NHL) from 1996 to 1998. The system was intended to help television viewers visually follow a hockey puck on the ice, especially near the bottom of the rink where the traditional center ice camera was unable to see it due to the sideboards obstructing the puck's location. The system used modified hockey pucks containing shock sensors and infrared emitters, which were then read by sensors and computer systems to generate on-screen graphics, such as a blue "glow" around the puck, and other enhancements such as trails to indicate the hardness and speed of shots.

The system was first used during the 1996 NHL All-Star Game, and was used until the end of the 1997–1998 season. FoxTrax received mixed reviews from viewers and critics; although some viewers thought that FoxTrax helped them follow the game more easily, the concept was criticized (especially by Canadian critics) for being a gimmick that distracted from the game.

== History ==
In 1994, Fox won a contract to broadcast NHL games in the United States. David Hill, the head of Fox Sports at the time, believed that if viewers could easily follow the puck, the game would seem less confusing to newcomers, and hence become more appealing to a broader audience. Hill pitched the idea to Rupert Murdoch, who approved the development of FoxTrax under electrical engineer Stan Honey. The FoxTrax puck was first used during the 1996 NHL All-Star Game. It was last used during the first game of the 1998 Stanley Cup Finals. Fox was scheduled to televise Games 5 and 7, but the series ended in four games. In August 1998, the NHL broadcast rights went to ABC, and FoxTrax was not brought back for the final season.

Fox has since used "FoxTrax" as a branding for other on-screen tracking graphics in other sports properties, such as a virtual strike zone during baseball games, and statistics displays during NASCAR events. They are related to the puck in name only.

== Construction and operation ==
The technology was co-developed with Etak; the system utilized a modified hockey puck, cut in half to embed an array of infrared emitters, a shock sensor, and an embedded circuit board and battery. The halves of the puck were then bound back together using an epoxy. The modified pucks were engineered to have the same weight and balance as an unmodified NHL puck; chief engineer Rick Cavallaro noted that players could tell if the puck was even slightly off its normal weight, as it behaved differently. While the puck passed rigorous tests by the NHL to qualify as an official puck, some players who tested the puck felt that it had more rebound.

The puck emitted infrared pulses that were detected by cameras, whose shutters were synchronized to the pulses. Data from the cameras was transmitted to a production trailer nicknamed the "Puck Truck", which contained SGI workstations used to calculate the coordinates of candidate targets, and render appropriate graphics onto them. The puck was given a blue-colored glow. Passes were indicated with the bluish glow plus a tail indicating its path. When the puck moved faster than 70 miles per hour, a red tail was added. The blue glow was initially intended as a placeholder effect; while Fox Sports' graphics department intended to create a different design for the graphic, the blue blur was kept.

Despite rumors that Fox employees would sometimes go into the stands to retrieve a puck that left the playing area, the pucks were not re-usable, and only had a battery life of around 18 minutes. Around 50 pucks were brought to each game where FoxTrax was deployed, while Cavallaro noted that they were prized by spectators.

== Public response ==
The FoxTrax system was widely criticized by hockey fans, who felt that the graphics were distracting and meant to make the broadcasts cater towards casual viewers; sportswriter Greg Wyshynski stated that FoxTrax was "cheesy enough that it looked like hockey by way of a Mighty Morphin Power Rangers production budget", and considered it "a sad commentary on what outsiders thought of both hockey and American hockey fans". Acknowledging that Canadian-born journalist Peter Jennings (who was interviewed as a guest during the 1996 All-Star Game that introduced the technology) stated on-air that Canadians would "probably hate it", Wyshynski suggested that FoxTrax was an admission that American viewers were "too hockey-stupid to follow the play" or "need to be distracted by shiny new toys in order to watch the sport."

In 2002, an informal poll by ESPN solicited opinions from readers on the worst innovations in sports history, without specifying choices in advance. The Fox glow puck came in 6th place, just behind free agency. A survey commissioned by Fox itself claimed that 10 out of 10 respondents liked the new puck. In 2014, sportswriter Aaron Brown of Slate called it "one of sports broadcasting’s most-ridiculed experiments."

Cavallaro defended FoxTrax in a 1997 paper for IEEE Computer Graphics and Applications, calling it an "overall success" that contributed to higher ratings for Fox. "While we certainly had moments of doubt, the Puck Truck proved successful at every event it attended," he wrote. "It's true that some fans don't care for the effect, but many think it's an improvement." He later claimed that "most people were impressed by the technology even if they hated the effect." Building upon his work, Cavallaro co-established a new company known as Sportvision in 1998, which marketed other forms of sports graphics technologies, including virtual down lines for football.

As part of a larger project with SAP and Sportvision, the NHL had since experimented with player and puck tracking using embedded microchips. The new system's capabilities were demonstrated on-air during the 2019 NHL All-Star Game. The NHL planned to deploy tracking at all arenas for the 2019–20 season, however this was delayed to the 2020–21 season due to a change in technology provider.
