= GameDay (software) =

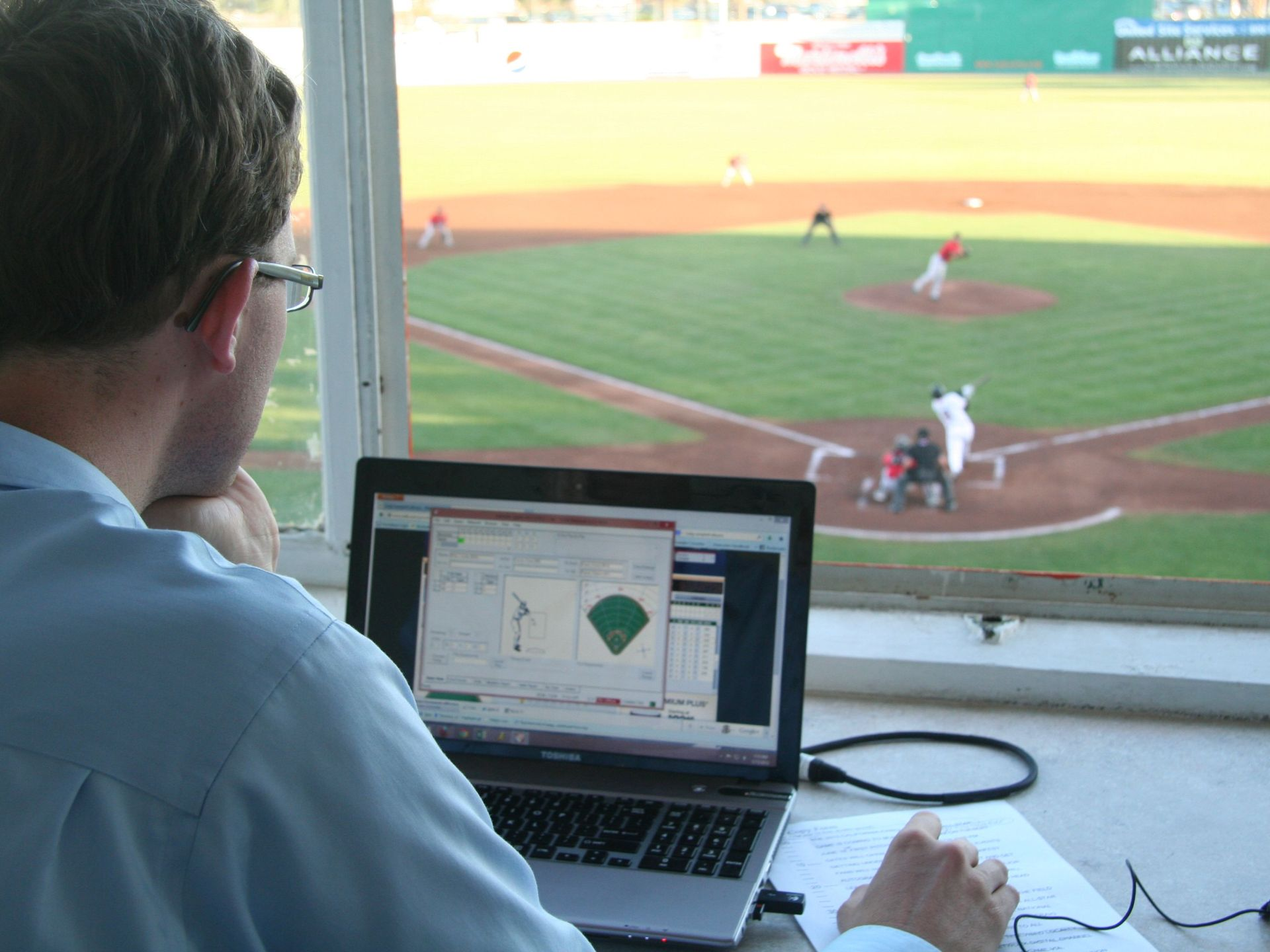
Feeding the Gameday client at the San Jose Giants, 2013

GameDay is a software program that allows sports fans to track games with live stats. For Major League Baseball, it was introduced in 2002, a year after all team sites were migrated to MLB.com. The software provides improved features such as camera angle and pitch speed, as well as pitch angle and break. It also contains a news ticker. The service was free until 2023, when it was incorporated in GameDay 3D available only to paid subscribers.
