= Dallas Cowboys =

NFL team in the Dallas metropolitan area

- Current season
Logo	Wordmark
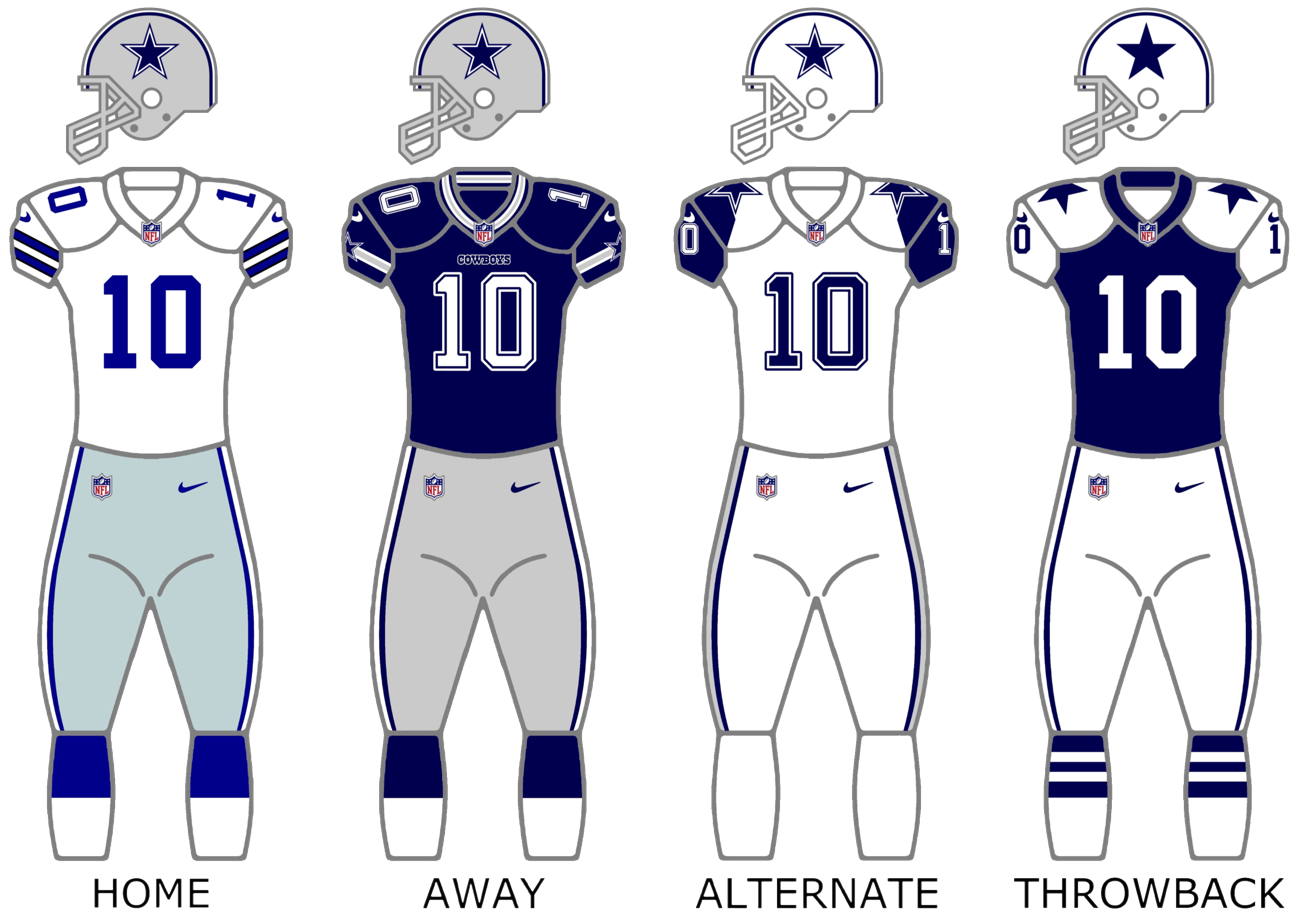
- Uniforms

General information
- Founded: January 28, 1960; 66 years ago
- Stadium: AT&T Stadium; Arlington, Texas
- Headquartered: Ford Center at The Star; Frisco, Texas
- Colors: Navy blue, silver, royal blue, metallic silver blue, white
- Fight song: Cowboys Stampede March
- Mascot: Rowdy
- Website: dallascowboys.com

Personnel
- Owner: Jerry Jones
- CEO: Stephen Jones
- General manager: Jerry Jones
- Head coach: Brian Schottenheimer

Nicknames
- America's Team; The 'Boys; Big D; Doomsday Defense (under Tom Landry)

Team history
- Dallas Cowboys (1960–present)

Home fields
- Cotton Bowl (1960–1971); Texas Stadium (1971–2008); AT&T Stadium (2009–present)

League / conference affiliations
- National Football League (1960–present): Western Conference (1960); Eastern Conference (1961–1969); Capitol Division (1967–1969); National Football Conference (1970–present); NFC East (1970–present)

Championships
- Super Bowl championships: 5 1971 (VI), 1977 (XII), 1992 (XXVII), 1993 (XXVIII), 1995 (XXX)
- Conference championships: 10: NFL Eastern: 1966, 1967; NFC: 1970, 1971, 1975, 1977, 1978, 1992, 1993, 1995
- Division championships: 25: NFL Capitol: 1967, 1968, 1969; NFC East: 1970, 1971, 1973, 1976, 1977, 1978, 1979, 1981, 1985, 1992, 1993, 1994, 1995, 1996, 1998, 2007, 2009, 2014, 2016, 2018, 2021, 2023

Playoff appearances (36)
- NFL: 1966, 1967, 1968, 1969, 1970, 1971, 1972, 1973, 1975, 1976, 1977, 1978, 1979, 1980, 1981, 1982, 1983, 1985, 1991, 1992, 1993, 1994, 1995, 1996, 1998, 1999, 2003, 2006, 2007, 2009, 2014, 2016, 2018, 2021, 2022, 2023

Owners
- Clint Murchison Jr. (1960–1984); Bum Bright (1984–1989); Jerry Jones (1989–present)

The Dallas Cowboys are a professional American football team based in the Dallas–Fort Worth metroplex. The Cowboys compete in the National Football League (NFL) as a member of the National Football Conference (NFC) East division. The team is headquartered in Frisco, Texas, and has played its home games at AT&T Stadium in Arlington, Texas, since its opening in 2009. The stadium took its current name prior to the 2013 season, following the team's decision to sell the stadium's naming rights to telecommunications company AT&T.

The Cowboys joined the NFL as an expansion team in 1960. The team's national following might best be represented by its NFL record of consecutive sellouts. The Cowboys' streak of 190 consecutive sold out regular and postseason games (home and away) began in 2002. The franchise has made it to the Super Bowl eight times, tying it with the Pittsburgh Steelers, Denver Broncos, and San Francisco 49ers for second-most Super Bowl appearances in history behind the New England Patriots' record 12 appearances. Their eight NFC championships are tied for most in the conference's history. The Cowboys are the only NFL team to record 20 straight winning seasons (from 1966 to 1985) during which they missed the playoffs only twice (1974 and 1984).

In 2015, the Dallas Cowboys became the first sports team to be valued at $4 billion, making it the most valuable sports team in the world, according to Forbes. In 2016, the Cowboys also became the most valuable sports team at $4 billion, a record they have held since by also being the first sports team to reach a worth of $10 billion dollars. As of late 2025, the Cowboys are valued at about $13 billion. The Cowboys also generated $620 million in revenue in 2014, a record for a U.S. sports team. In 2018, they also became the first NFL franchise to be valued at $5 billion and making Forbes' list as the most valued NFL team for the 12th straight year.

== History ==
=== Origins ===
Prior to the formation of the Dallas Cowboys, there had not been an NFL team south of Washington, D.C. since the Dallas Texans folded in 1952 after only one season. Two businessmen had tried and failed to get Dallas a team in the NFL: Lamar Hunt responded by forming the American Football League with a group of owners, which would spur the NFL to expand beyond twelve teams. Oilman Clint Murchison Jr. persisted with his intent to bring a team to Dallas, but George Preston Marshall, owner of the Washington Redskins, had a monopoly in the South (after the addition of Dallas, the South would see three further teams - NFL teams in Atlanta and New Orleans, and an AFL team in Miami - added in the next six years).

Murchison had tried to purchase the Washington Redskins (now Commanders) from Marshall in 1958 with the intent of moving them to Dallas. An agreement was struck, but as the deal was about to be finalized, Marshall called for a change in terms, which infuriated Murchison, and he called off the deal. Marshall then opposed any franchise for Murchison in Dallas. Since NFL expansion needed unanimous approval from team owners at that time, Marshall's position would prevent Murchison from joining the league.

Marshall had a falling out with the Redskins band leader Barnee Breeskin, who had written the music to the Redskins fight song "Hail to the Redskins", and Marshall's wife had penned the lyrics. Breeskin owned the rights to the song and was aware of Murchison's plight to get an NFL franchise. Angry with Marshall, Breeskin approached Murchison's attorney to sell him the rights to the song before the expansion vote in 1959: Murchison subsequently purchased "Hail to the Redskins" for $2,500.

Before the vote to award franchises in 1959, Murchison revealed to Marshall that he now owned the song, and barred Marshall from playing it during games. After Marshall launched an expletive-laced tirade, Murchison sold the rights to "Hail to the Redskins" back to Marshall in exchange for his vote, the lone one against Murchison getting a franchise at that time, and a rivalry was born. Murchison hired CBS Sports executive and former Los Angeles Rams general manager Tex Schramm as team president and general manager, San Francisco 49ers scout Gil Brandt as head of player personnel, and New York Giants defensive coordinator Tom Landry as head coach, thus forming a triumvirate that would lead the Cowboys' football operations for three decades.

=== Tom Landry years (1960–1988) ===
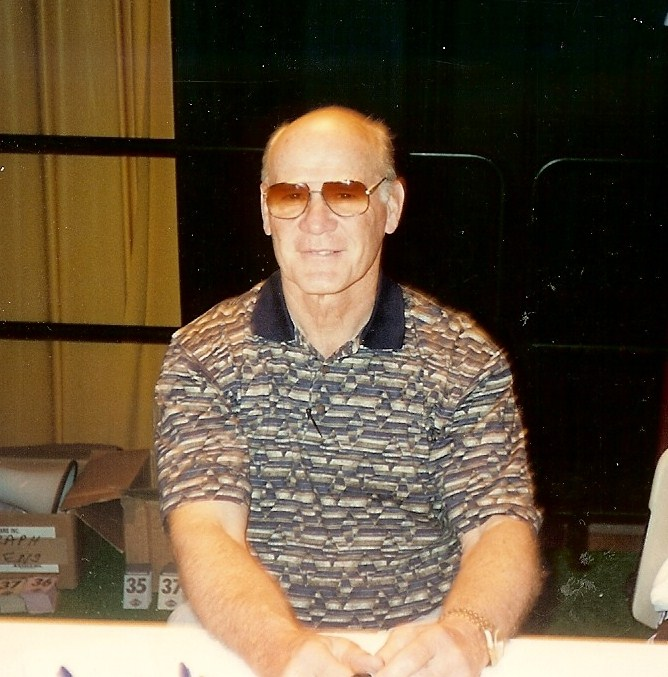
Tom Landry, pictured here in 1997, coached the team from 1960 to 1988 and led the Cowboys to five Super Bowl appearances and two Super Bowl victories in 1971 and 1977

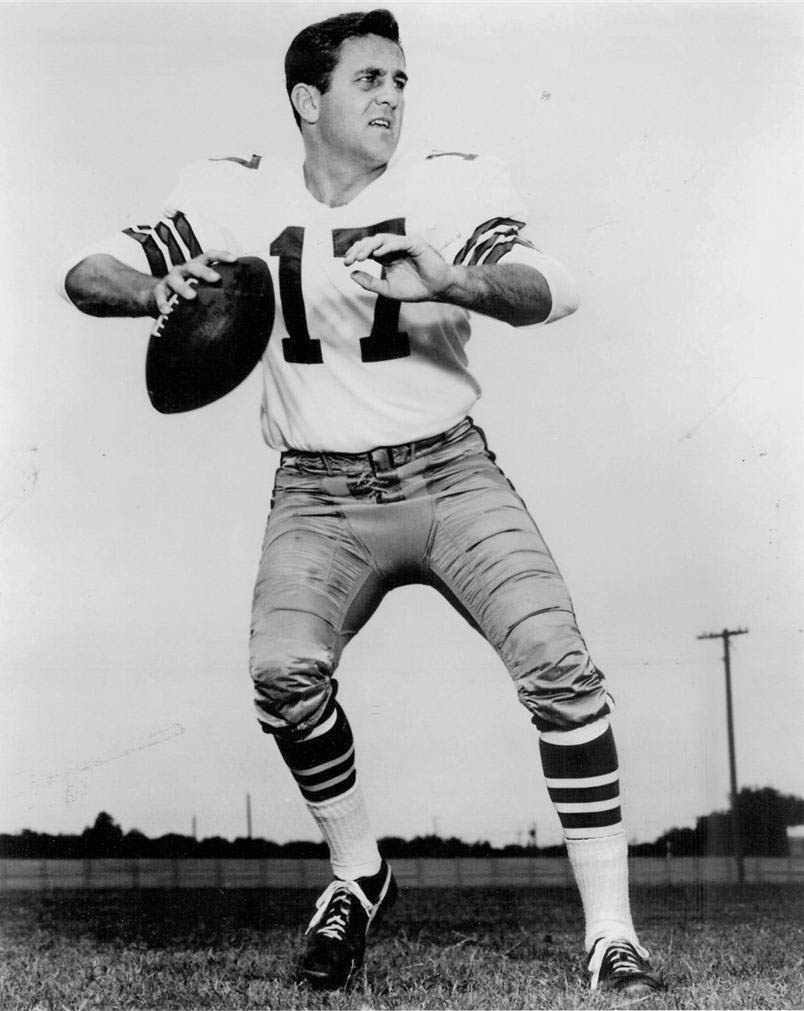
Don Meredith was the first franchise quarterback of the Cowboys. NFL Films cited Meredith as the first "star" of the franchise, leading them to back-to-back NFL Championship Game appearances during the 1966 and 1967 seasons, both times falling one game shy of the Super Bowl

Like most expansion teams, the Cowboys struggled at first. They failed to win a game in their inaugural season. However, Landry slowly brought the team to respectability. In 1965, they finally got to .500. They broke all the way through a year later, winning consecutive Eastern Conference titles in 1966 and 1967. However, they lost the NFL Championship Game each time to the Green Bay Packers with the second loss coming in the 1967 Ice Bowl. They would win consecutive division titles in 1968 and 1969 when the NFL adopted a divisional format, but were defeated in the playoffs both years by the Cleveland Browns.

From 1970 through 1979, the Cowboys won 105 regular season games, more than any other NFL franchise during that time span. In addition, they appeared in five Super Bowls, winning two (1971 and 1977).

Led by quarterback Craig Morton, the Cowboys had a 10–4 season in 1970. They defeated Detroit 5–0 in the lowest-scoring playoff game in NFL history and then defeated San Francisco 17–10 in the first-ever NFC Championship Game to qualify for their first Super Bowl appearance in franchise history, a mistake-filled Super Bowl V, where they lost 16–13 to the Baltimore Colts courtesy of a field goal by Colts' kicker Jim O'Brien with five seconds remaining in the contest. Despite the loss, linebacker Chuck Howley was named the Super Bowl MVP, the first and only time in Super Bowl history that the game's MVP did not come from the winning team.

==== Super Bowl VI champions (1971) ====
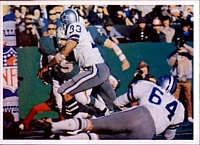
The Cowboys playing the Miami Dolphins in Super Bowl VI in 1971

The Cowboys moved from the Cotton Bowl to Texas Stadium in week six of the 1971 season. Landry named Roger Staubach as the permanent starting quarterback to start the second half of the season, and Dallas was off and running. The Cowboys won their last seven regular season games (finishing 11–3) before dispatching the Minnesota Vikings and San Francisco 49ers in the playoffs to return to the Super Bowl. In Super Bowl VI, behind an MVP performance from Staubach and a then Super Bowl record 252 yards rushing, the Cowboys crushed the upstart Miami Dolphins, 24–3, to finally bury the "Next Year's Champions" stigma.

After missing the playoffs in 1974, the team drafted well the following year, adding defensive lineman Randy White (a future Hall of Fame member) and linebacker Thomas "Hollywood" Henderson. The fresh influx of talent helped the Cowboys back to the playoffs in 1975 as a wild card, losing to the Pittsburgh Steelers, 21–17, in Super Bowl X.

==== Super Bowl XII champions (1977) ====
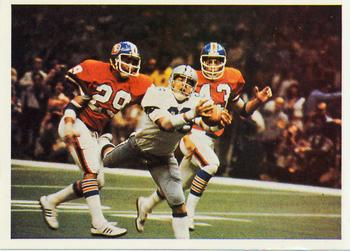
The Cowboys playing against the Denver Broncos in Super Bowl XII in 1977

Dallas began the 1977 season 8–0, finishing 12–2. In the postseason, the Cowboys routed the Chicago Bears 37–7 and Minnesota Vikings 23–6 before defeating the Denver Broncos 27–10 in Super Bowl XII in New Orleans. As a testament to Doomsday's dominance in the hard-hitting game, defensive linemen Randy White and Harvey Martin were named co-Super Bowl MVPs, the first and only time multiple players have received the award. Dallas returned to the Super Bowl following the 1978 season, losing to Pittsburgh 35–31. Bob Ryan, an NFL Films editor, dubbed the Cowboys "America's Team" following the Super Bowl loss, a nickname that has earned derision from non-Cowboys fans but has stuck through both good times and bad. Danny White became the Cowboys' starting quarterback in 1980 after quarterback Roger Staubach retired. Despite going 12–4 in 1980, the Cowboys came into the playoffs as a wild card team. In the opening round of the 1980–81 NFL playoffs, they avenged their elimination from the prior year's playoffs by defeating the Rams. In the Divisional Round, they squeaked by the Atlanta Falcons 30–27. For the NFC Championship, they were pitted against division rival Philadelphia Eagles, the team that won the division during the regular season. The Eagles captured their first conference championship and Super Bowl berth by winning 20–7.

1981 brought another division championship for the Cowboys. They entered the 1981–82 NFL playoffs as the number 2 seed. Their first postseason saw them blow out Tampa Bay in a 38–0 shutout. The Cowboys then advanced to the NFC Championship Game against the San Francisco 49ers, the number 1 seed. Despite having a late 4th quarter 27–21 lead, they would lose to the 49ers 28–27. 49ers quarterback Joe Montana led his team on an 89-yard game-winning touchdown drive, connecting with Dwight Clark in a play known as The Catch.

The 1982 season was shortened after a player strike. With a 6–3 record, Dallas made it to the playoffs for the 8th consecutive season. As the number 2 seed for the 1982–83 NFL playoffs, they eliminated the Buccaneers 30–17 in the Wild Card round and dispatched the Packers 37–26 in the Divisional round to advance to their 3rd consecutive Conference championship game. However, the third time was not the charm for the Cowboys as they fell 31–17 to their division rival and eventual Super Bowl XVII champions, the Washington Redskins.

Although it was not apparent at the time, the loss in the 1982 NFC title game marked the end of an era. For the 1983 season, the Cowboys went 12–4 and made it once again to the playoffs, but were upset at home in the Wild Card by the Rams 24–17. However, 1983 was a missed opportunity as prior to their playoff defeat, the Cowboys had a chance to clinch the NFC East and home-field advantage throughout the playoffs against Washington in the penultimate week of the regular season, but were defeated soundly 31–10 at home, and conceded control of the division to the Redskins in which they would not relinquish a week later. Prior to the 1984 season, Murchison sold the Cowboys to another Texas oil magnate, H.R. "Bum" Bright and his ten partners. Dallas posted a 9–7 record that season but missed the playoffs for the first time in 10 seasons and only the second time in 18 years. After going 10–6 in 1985 and winning a division title, the Cowboys were shut out 20–0 by the Rams in the Divisional round in Los Angeles.

Hard times came for the organization as they went 7–9 in 1986, 7–8 in 1987, and 3–13 in 1988. During this time period, Bright became disenchanted with the team. During an embarrassing home loss to Atlanta in 1987, Bright told the media that he was "horrified" at Landry's play calling. During the savings and loan crisis, Bright's savings and loan was taken over by the FSLIC. With most of the rest of his money tied up in the Cowboys, Bright was forced to sell the team to Jerry Jones on February 25, 1989, for $150 million.

=== Jerry Jones era (1989–present) ===
==== Jimmy Johnson years (1989–1993) ====
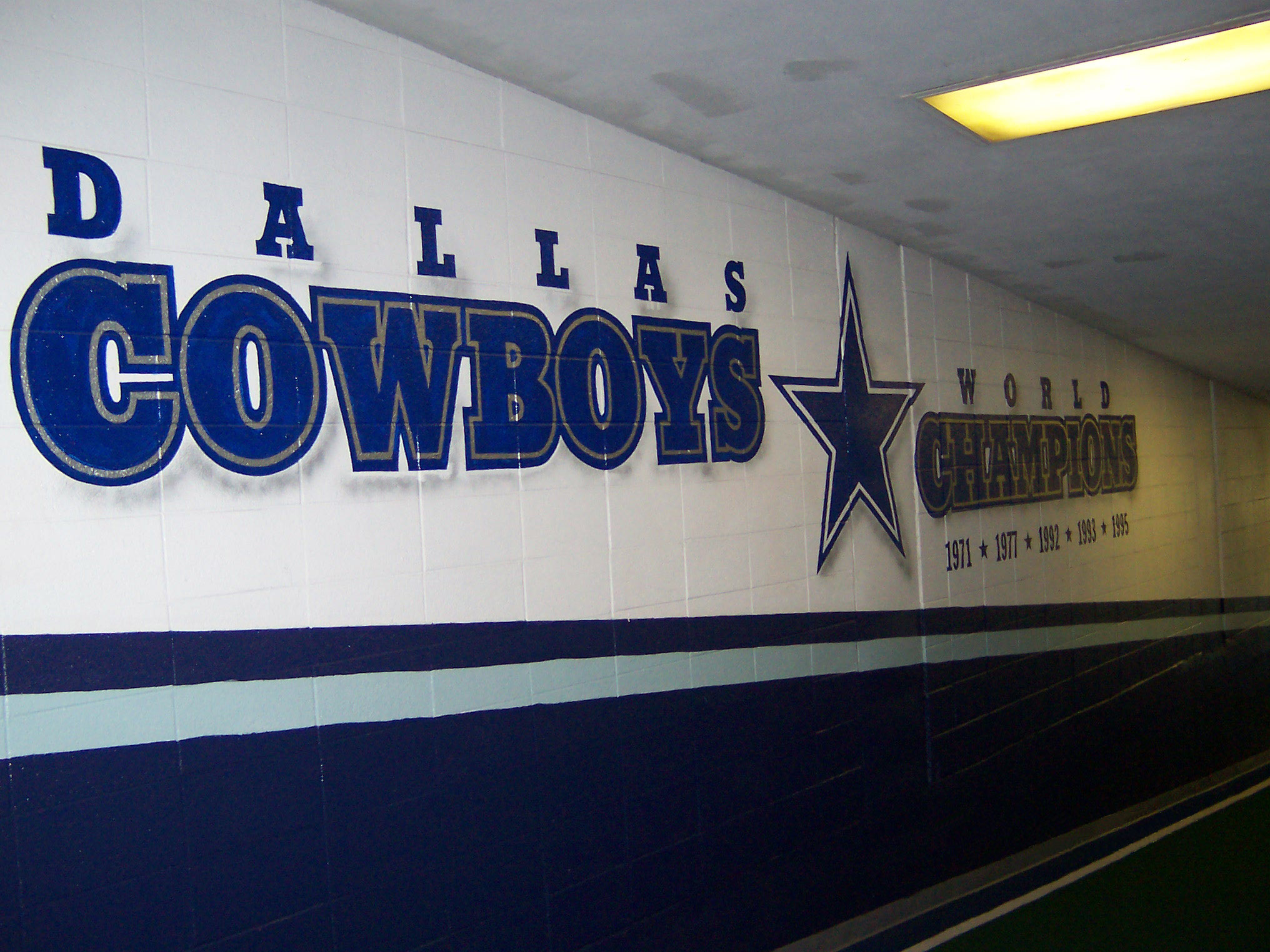
The five-time world champions mural

Jones immediately fired Tom Landry, the only head coach in franchise history, replacing him with University of Miami head coach Jimmy Johnson, who was also Jones' teammate at the University of Arkansas as a fellow defensive lineman. The hiring of Johnson also reunited Johnson with second-year wide receiver Michael Irvin, who had played collegiately at Miami. With the first pick in the draft, the Cowboys selected UCLA quarterback Troy Aikman. Later that same year, they would trade veteran running back Herschel Walker to the Minnesota Vikings for five veteran players and eight draft choices. Although the Cowboys finished the 1989 season with a 1–15 record, their worst in almost 30 years, "The Trade" later allowed Dallas to draft a number of impact players to rebuild the team.

Johnson quickly returned the Cowboys to the NFL's elite. Skillful drafts added fullback Daryl Johnston and center Mark Stepnoski in 1989, running back Emmitt Smith in 1990, defensive tackle Russell Maryland and offensive tackle Erik Williams in 1991, and safety Darren Woodson in 1992. The young talent joined holdovers from the Landry era such as wide receiver Michael Irvin, guard Nate Newton, middle linebacker Ken Norton Jr., and offensive tackle Mark Tuinei, defensive tackle Jim Jeffcoat, and veteran pickups such as tight end Jay Novacek and defensive end Charles Haley.

Things started to look up for the franchise in 1990. On Week 1 Dallas won their first home game since September 1988 when they defeated the San Diego Chargers 17–14. They went 2–7 in their next 9 games but won 4 of their last 6 games to finish the season with a 4th place 7–9 record.

Coming into 1991 the Cowboys replaced offensive coordinator Dave Shula with Norv Turner; the Cowboys raced to a 6–5 start, then defeated the previously unbeaten Redskins despite injury to Troy Aikman. Backup Steve Beuerlein took over and the Cowboys finished 11–5. In the Wild Card round they defeated the Bears 17–13 for the Cowboys' first playoff win since 1982. In the Divisional round their season ended in a 38–6 playoff rout by the Lions.

==== Super Bowl XXVII champions (1992) ====
In 1992 Dallas set a team record for regular-season wins with a 13–3 mark. They started off the season by defeating the defending Super Bowl champion Redskins 23–10. Going into the playoffs as the number 2 seed they had a first round bye before facing division rival the Philadelphia Eagles. The Cowboys won that game 34–10 to advance to the NFC Conference Championship game for the first time in 10 years. They were pitted against the San Francisco 49ers, the top seed. On January 17, 1993, the Cowboys went to Candlestick Park and defeated the 49ers 30–20 to clinch their first Super Bowl berth since 1978. Dallas defeated the Buffalo Bills 52–17 in Super Bowl XXVII, during which they forced a record nine turnovers. Johnson became the first coach to claim a national championship in college football and a Super Bowl victory in professional football.

==== Super Bowl XXVIII champions (1993) ====
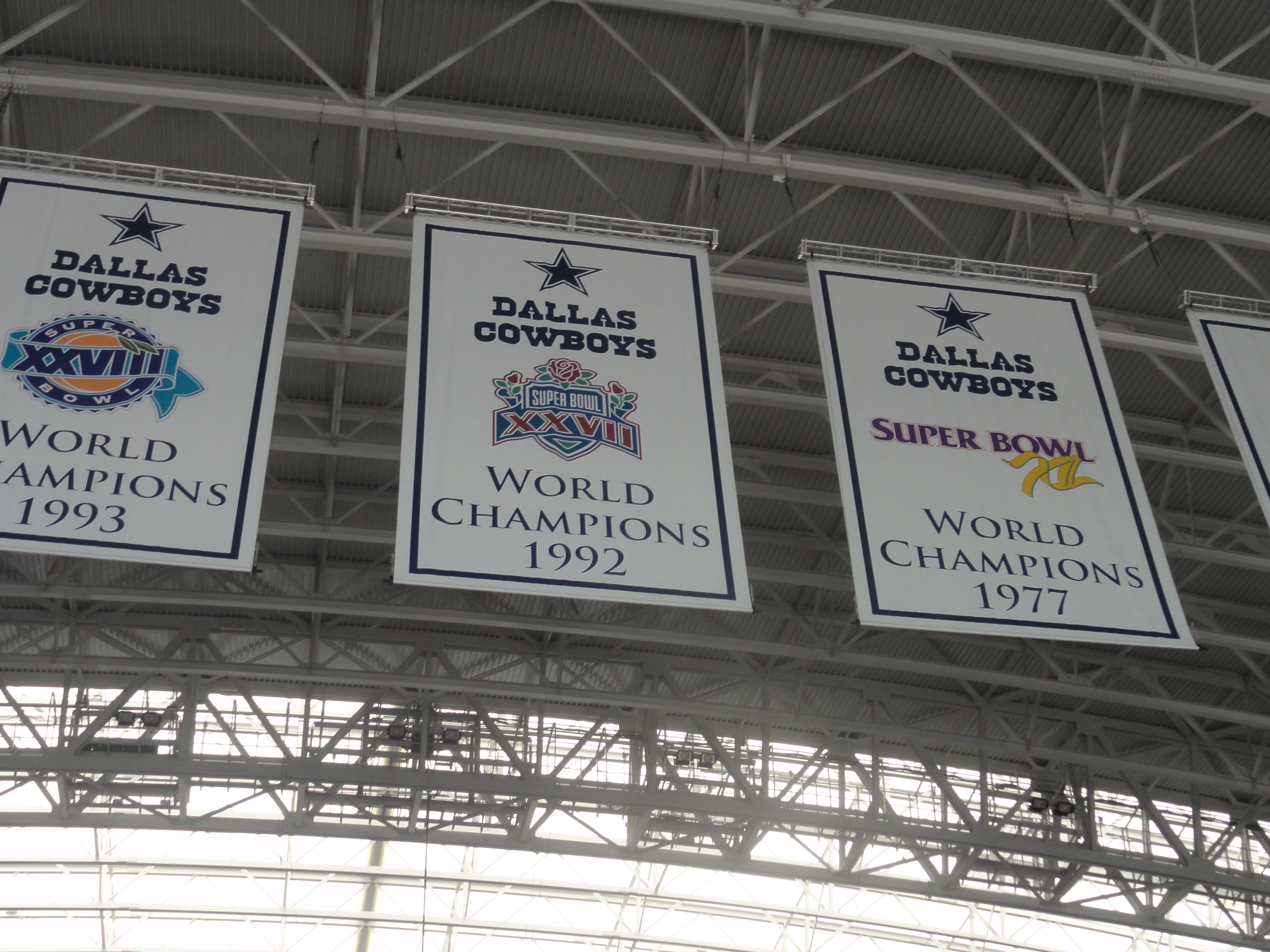
Dallas Cowboys championship banners inside AT&T Stadium

Despite starting the 1993 season 0–2, Dallas finished the regular season 12–4 as the number 1 seed of the NFC. Dallas sent a then-NFL record 11 players to the Pro Bowl in 1993: Aikman, safety Thomas Everett, Irvin, Johnston, Maryland, Newton, Norton, Novacek, Smith, Stepnoski, and Williams. They defeated the Green Bay Packers 27–17 in the divisional round. In the NFC Conference Championship, Dallas beat the 49ers in Dallas, 38–21. The Cowboys again defeated the Buffalo Bills in Super Bowl XXVIII, 30–13 (becoming the first team in NFL history to win a Super Bowl after starting 0–2).

==== Barry Switzer years (1994–1997) ====
Only weeks after Super Bowl XXVIII, however, friction between Johnson and Jones culminated in Johnson stunning the football world by announcing his resignation. Jones then hired former University of Oklahoma head coach Barry Switzer to replace Johnson. The Cowboys finished 12–4 in 1994. They once again clinched a first-round bye and defeated Green Bay 35–9 in the Divisional Round. They missed the Super Bowl, however, after losing to the San Francisco 49ers in the NFC Championship Game, 38–28.

==== Super Bowl XXX champions (1995) ====
Prior to the start of 1995 season Jerry Jones lured All-Pro cornerback Deion Sanders away from San Francisco. Dallas started the season 4–0 including shutting out their division rival New York Giants 35–0 at Giants Stadium to open their season. Emmitt Smith set an NFL record with 25 rushing touchdowns that season. They ended the season 12–4 and went into the playoffs as the number 1 seed. In the Divisional round, they dispatched their division rival Eagles 30–11 to advance to their fourth consecutive NFC Conference Championship Game, in which they defeated Green Bay, 38–27. In Super Bowl XXX the Cowboys defeated the Pittsburgh Steelers 27–17 at Sun Devil Stadium for their fifth Super Bowl championship, tied with the San Francisco 49ers for the most by any NFC team. Switzer joined Johnson as the only coaches to win a college football national championship and a Super Bowl.

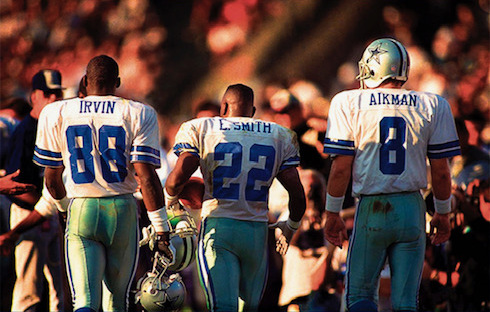
The trio of Troy Aikman, Emmitt Smith, and Michael Irvin (known as "The Triplets") led the Cowboys to three Super Bowl wins

The glory days of the Cowboys were again beginning to dim as free agency, age, and injuries began taking their toll. Star receiver Michael Irvin was suspended by the league for the first five games of 1996 following a drug-related arrest; he came back after the Cowboys started the season 2–3. They finished the regular season with a 10–6 record, won the NFC East title, and entered the playoffs as the number 3 seed in the NFC. They defeated Minnesota 40–15 in the Wild Card round but were eliminated in the Divisional Round of the playoffs 26–17 by the Carolina Panthers.

The Cowboys went 6–10 in 1997, losing the last six consecutive games of the season, with discipline and off-field problems becoming major distractions. As a result, Switzer resigned as head coach in January 1998 and former Steelers offensive coordinator Chan Gailey was hired to take his place.

==== Gailey and Campo years (1998–2002) ====
Gailey led the team to two playoff appearances with a 10–6 record in 1998 and an NFC East championship, the Cowboys' sixth in seven years, but the Cowboys were upset at home in the Wild Card Round of the playoffs by the Arizona Cardinals 20–7.

In 1999 Dallas went 8–8 in a season that featured Irvin suffering a career-ending cervical spine injury in a loss to the Philadelphia Eagles at Veterans Stadium. The season ended in a 27–10 Wild Card playoff loss to the Minnesota Vikings. Gailey was fired and became the first Cowboys coach who did not take the team to a Super Bowl.

Defensive coordinator Dave Campo was promoted to head coach for the 2000 season. Prior to the season starting cornerback Deion Sanders was released after 5 seasons with the team. He later signed with the division rival Washington Redskins. In Week 1, they were blown out 41–14 by the Philadelphia Eagles. That game was very costly when veteran quarterback Troy Aikman suffered a serious concussion which ultimately ended his career. Longtime NFL quarterback Randall Cunningham filled in for Aikman for the rest of the season at quarterback. The Cowboys finished the season in 4th place with a 5–11 record. The only highlights of 2000 were Emmitt Smith having his 10th consecutive 1,000-yard rushing season and a season sweep over the Redskins.

2001 was another hard year in Dallas. Prior to the season starting Aikman was released from the team and he retired due to the concussions he had received. Jerry Jones signed Tony Banks as a quarterback. Banks had been a starter for half of the season the previous year for the Super Bowl XXXV champion Baltimore Ravens before being benched. Jones also drafted quarterback Quincy Carter in the second round of that year's draft, and Banks was released during the preseason. Ryan Leaf, Anthony Wright, and Clint Stoerner all competed for the quarterback position that season. Dallas again finished at 5–11, last place in the NFC East, but they swept the Washington Redskins for the 4th consecutive season.

Prior to the 2002 season Dallas drafted safety Roy Williams with the 8th overall pick. The season started out low as the Cowboys lost to the expansion Houston Texans 19–10 in Week 1. By far the highlight of 2002 was on October 28, when during a home game against the Seattle Seahawks, Emmitt Smith broke the all-time NFL rushing record previously held by Walter Payton. Their Thanksgiving Day win over the Washington Redskins was their 10th consecutive win against the Redskins. However, that was their final 2002 win as the team lost their next four games to finish with another last-place 5–11 record. The losing streak was punctuated with a Week 17 20–14 loss against the Redskins. That game was Smith's last game as a Cowboys player; he was released during the offseason. Campo was immediately fired as head coach at the conclusion of the season.

==== Bill Parcells years (2003–2006) ====
Jones then lured Bill Parcells out of retirement to coach the Cowboys. The Cowboys became the surprise team of the 2003 season getting off to a hot 7–2 start, but went 3–4 for the rest of the season. They were able to grab the second NFC wild-card spot with a 10–6 record but lost in the Wild Card round to eventual conference champion Carolina Panthers, 29–10.

In 2004 Dallas was unable to replicate their 2003 success and ended 6–10. Quincy Carter was released during the preseason and was replaced at quarterback by Vinny Testaverde.

Dallas got off to a great 7–3 start for the 2005 season but ended up only in 3rd place with a 9–7 record. Prior to the beginning of that season, they signed veteran Drew Bledsoe as starting quarterback.

2006 was an interesting year for the Cowboys. Prior to the season, they signed free agent wide receiver Terrell Owens who was talented yet controversial. The Cowboys started the season 3–2. During a week 7 matchup against the New York Giants, Bledsoe, who had been struggling since the start of the season, was pulled from the game and was replaced by backup Tony Romo. Romo was unable to salvage that game and Dallas lost 36–22. However, Romo was named the starter for the team and went 5–1 in his first 6 games. Dallas ended the season with a 9–7 2nd-place finish. They were able to clinch the number 5 playoff seed. They traveled to play the Seattle Seahawks where the Seahawks won 21–20. After the season Parcells retired and was replaced by Wade Phillips.

==== Wade Phillips years (2007–2010) ====
Dallas started the 2007 season with a bang, winning their first five games. They won 12 of their first 13 games, with their only loss during that span being to the New England Patriots, who went undefeated that season. Despite dropping two of their last three regular-season games, the Cowboys clinched their first number 1 NFC seed in 12 years, which also granted them a first-round bye and home-field advantage throughout the playoffs. They lost in the divisional round 21–17 to the eventual Super Bowl champion New York Giants.

In the tumultuous 2008 season, the Cowboys started off strong, going 3–0 for the second straight year, en route to a 4–1 start. However, things soon went downhill from there, after quarterback Tony Romo suffered a broken pinkie in an overtime loss to the Arizona Cardinals. With Brad Johnson and Brooks Bollinger playing as backups, Dallas went 1–2 during a three-game stretch. Romo's return showed promise, as Dallas went 3–0. However, injuries mounted during the season, with the team losing several starters for the year, such as Kyle Kosier, Felix Jones, safety Roy Williams, punter Mat McBriar, and several other starters playing with injuries. Entering December, the 8–4 Cowboys underperformed, finishing 1–3. They failed to make the playoffs after losing to the Philadelphia Eagles in the final regular-season game which saw the Eagles reach the playoffs instead.

On May 2, 2009, the Dallas Cowboys' practice facility collapsed during a wind storm. The collapse left twelve Cowboys players and coaches injured. The most serious injuries were special teams coach Joe DeCamillis, who suffered fractured cervical vertebrae and had surgery to stabilize fractured vertebrae in his neck, and Rich Behm, the team's 33-year-old scouting assistant, who was permanently paralyzed from the waist down after his spine was severed.

The 2009 season started positively with a road win against the Tampa Bay Buccaneers, but fortunes quickly changed as Dallas fell to a 2–2 start. In week five, with starting wide receiver Roy Williams sidelined by injury, receiver Miles Austin got his first start of the season and had a record-setting day (250 yards receiving and 2 touchdowns) to help lead Dallas to an overtime win over the Kansas City Chiefs. Following their bye week, they went on a three-game winning streak including wins over the Atlanta Falcons and NFC East division rival Philadelphia Eagles. Despite entering December with a record of 8–3, they lost their slim grip on 1st place in the division with losses to the New York Giants and San Diego Chargers. Talks of past December collapses resurfaced, and another collapse in 2009 seemed validated. However, the team surged in the final three weeks of the season with a 24–17 victory against the eventual Super Bowl XLIV champion New Orleans Saints at the Louisiana Superdome, ending the Saints' previously unbeaten season in week 15. For the first time in franchise history, they posted back-to-back shutouts when they beat their division rivals, the Washington Redskins (17–0) and Philadelphia Eagles (24–0) to end the season. In the process, the Cowboys clinched their second NFC East title in three years as well as the third seed in the NFC Playoffs. Six days later, in the wild-card round of the playoffs, Dallas played the Eagles in a rematch of week 17. The Cowboys defeated the Eagles for the first Cowboys post-season win since the 1996 season, ending a streak of six consecutive NFL post-season losses. However, their playoff run ended after being routed 34–3 in the Divisional Round against the Minnesota Vikings.

After beginning the 2010 season at 1–7, Phillips was fired as head coach and was replaced by offensive coordinator Jason Garrett as the interim head coach.

==== Jason Garrett years (2010–2019) ====
With Garrett as interim head coach, the Cowboys finished the 2010 season 6–10 after beginning at 1–7. With this improvement, the Cowboys signed Garrett as the head coach for the 2011 season.

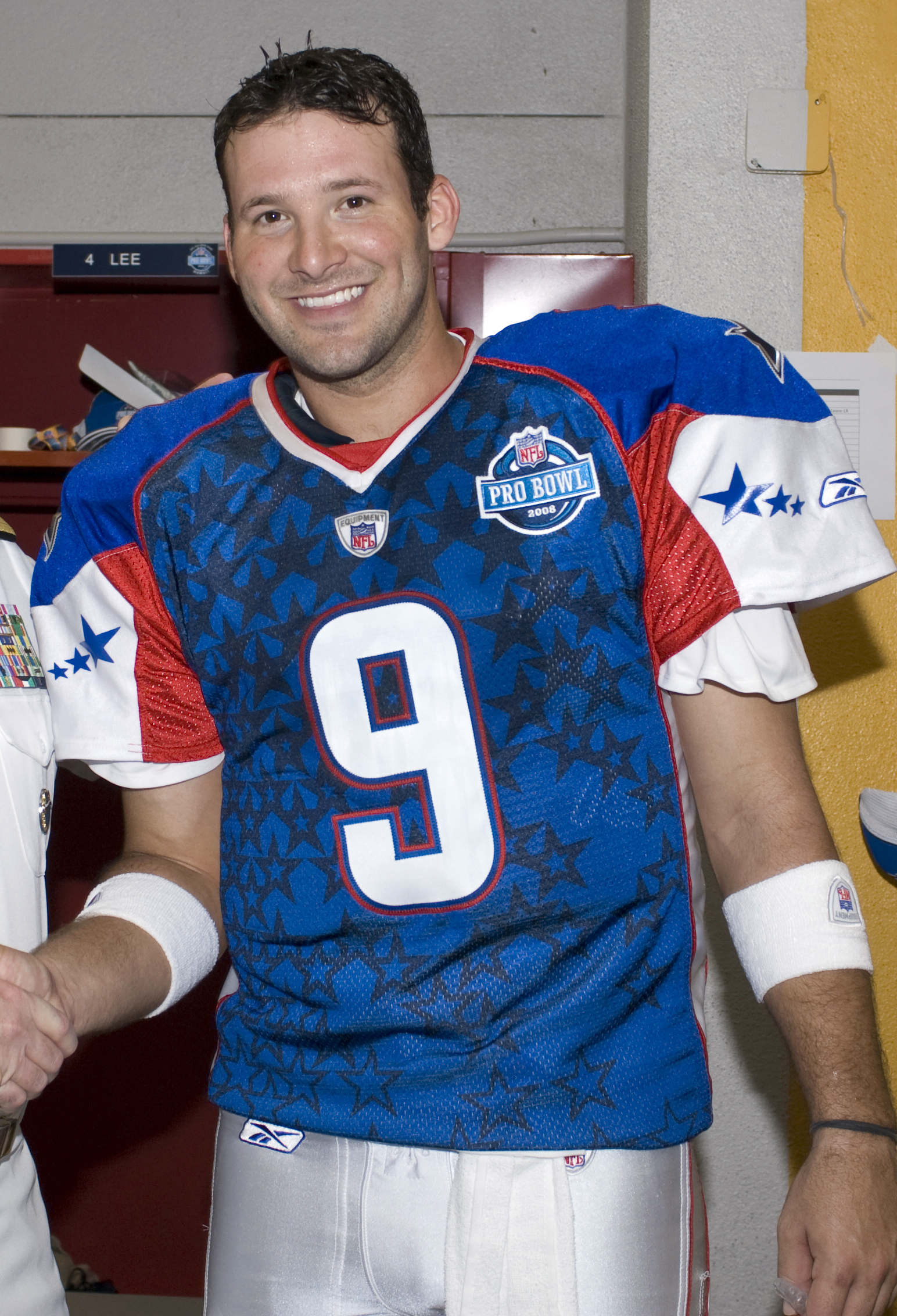
Tony Romo, pictured here in 2008, was starting quarterback for the Cowboys from 2006 to 2015

To start the 2011 season the Cowboys played the New York Jets on a Sunday night primetime game in New York, on September 11. The Cowboys held the lead through most of the game, until a fumble, blocked punt, and interception led to the Jets coming back to win the game. In week 2 the Cowboys traveled to San Francisco to play the San Francisco 49ers. In the middle of the 2nd quarter, while the Cowboys trailed 10–7, Tony Romo suffered a rib injury and was replaced by Jon Kitna. Kitna threw 1 touchdown and 2 interceptions until Romo returned in the 3rd quarter as Dallas trailed 17–7. Romo then threw 3 touchdown passes to Miles Austin as the Cowboys rallied to send the game into overtime. On their opening possession after a 49ers punt, Romo found wide receiver Jesse Holley on a 78-yard pass, which set up the game-winning field goal by rookie kicker Dan Bailey. The Cowboys ended the season 8–8. They were in a position to win the NFC East but lost to the New York Giants in a Week 17 primetime Sunday Night game on NBC which allowed the Giants to win the division. The Giants would go on to win Super Bowl XLVI.

The Cowboys started off the 2012 season on a high note by defeating the defending Super Bowl champion New York Giants 24–17 on the opening night of the season. They would hover around the .500 mark for the majority of the season. They lost a close Week 6 game to eventual Super Bowl XLVII champion Baltimore Ravens 31–29 at M&T Bank Stadium in Baltimore. Going into Week 17 they found themselves once again one win away from winning the division. Standing in their way were the Washington Redskins, who had beaten them on Thanksgiving at AT&T Stadium and who were one win away from their first division title since 1999. Led by Robert Griffin III the Redskins defeated the Cowboys at home 28–18. Dallas once again finished the season 8–8.

In the 2013 season the Cowboys started off by defeating the New York Giants for the second straight year; this time 36–31. It was the first time since 2008 that the Cowboys were able to defeat the Giants at home. The win was punctuated by Brandon Carr intercepting an Eli Manning pass for a touchdown late in the 4th quarter. For the third straight year, Dallas once again found itself stuck in the .500 area. In Week 5, they lost a shootout to the eventual AFC champion Denver Broncos 51–48. They battled it out with the Philadelphia Eagles for control of the division throughout the season. In December however they lost 2 crucial back-to-back games to the Chicago Bears and Green Bay Packers. They were very successful in division games having a 5–0 division record heading into another Week 17 showdown for the NFC East crown against the Eagles. That included beating the Washington Redskins 24–23 on Week 16 thanks to the late-game heroics of Tony Romo. However, Romo received a severe back injury in that game which prematurely ended his season. The Cowboys called upon backup quarterback Kyle Orton to lead them into battle on the final week of the season. Orton was unsuccessful who threw a game-ending interception to the Eagles which allowed the Eagles to win 24–22. Dallas ended the year at 8–8 for the third year in a row. The two differences from this 8–8 ending compared to the others was that Dallas ended the season in second place compared to the 2 previous 3rd-place finishes, along with their season-ending defeat taking place at home instead of on the road.

To start off the 2014 season Dallas began by losing to the San Francisco 49ers 28–17. After that, they went on a 6-game winning streak. The highlight of this streak was defeating the Super Bowl XLVIII champion Seattle Seahawks at CenturyLink Field 30–23. In Week 8, the Washington Redskins ended the Cowboys' winning streak by winning in overtime 20–17, and Romo injured his back again. He missed next week, a home loss to the Arizona Cardinals 28–17 with backup quarterback Brandon Weeden. Romo returned in Week 9 to lead a 31–17 victory over the Jacksonville Jaguars, which was played at Wembley Stadium in London, England as part of the NFL International Series. Dallas played their traditional Thanksgiving home game against their division rival Philadelphia Eagles. Both teams were vying for first place in the division with identical 8–3 records. The Eagles got off to a fast start and the Cowboys were unable to catch up, losing 33–10. They would rebound the next week when they defeated the Chicago Bears 41–28. Week 15 was a rematch against 1st place Philadelphia. This time it was the Cowboys who got off to a fast start going up 21–0. Then the Eagles put up 24 points but Dallas came back to win 38–27 to go into first place for the first time in the season and improve to 10–4. Going into their Week 16 matchup at home against the Indianapolis Colts, Dallas was in a position to clinch their first division title since 2009 by defeating the Colts 42-7 and the Eagles losing that week to the Redskins. They became the 2014 NFC East Champions, eliminating the Eagles from the playoffs. Dallas ended the regular season with a 12–4 record and an 8–0 away record when they won on the road against Washington 44–17.

On January 4, 2015, the Cowboys, as the number 3 seed, hosted the number 6 seed Detroit Lions in the wild-card round of the NFL playoffs. In the game, the Lions got off to a hot start, going up 14–0 in the first quarter. Dallas initially struggled on both sides of the ball. However, towards the end of the second quarter, Romo threw a 76-yard touchdown pass to Terrance Williams. Matt Prater of the Lions would kick a field goal before halftime to go up 17–7. Dallas came out swinging to start the second half by picking off Detroit quarterback Matthew Stafford on the first play of the third quarter. However, the Cowboys failed to capitalize on the turnover, as Dan Bailey missed a field goal during Dallas's ensuing drive. Detroit then kicked another field goal to make the score 20–7. A DeMarco Murray touchdown later in that quarter closed the gap to 20–14. A 51-yard Bailey field goal almost 3 minutes into the fourth quarter trimmed the Cowboys' deficit to 3. The Lions got the ball back and started driving down the field. On 3rd down-and-1 of that Lions drive, Stafford threw a 17-yard pass intended for Lions tight end Brandon Pettigrew, but the ball hit Cowboys linebacker Anthony Hitchens in the back a fraction of a second before he ran into Pettigrew. The play was initially flagged as defensive pass interference against Hitchens. However, the penalty was then nullified by the officiating crew. The Cowboys got the ball back on their 41-yard line and had a successful 59-yard drive which was capped off by an 8-yard touchdown pass from Romo to Williams to give the Cowboys their first lead of the game at 24–20. The Lions got the ball back with less than 2:30 to play in regulation. Stafford fumbled the ball at the 2-minute mark. The fumble was recovered by Cowboys defensive end DeMarcus Lawrence, who then fumbled the ball which was recovered by the Lions. Lawrence would redeem himself by sacking Stafford on a 4th down-and-3 play. The sack led to Stafford fumbling the ball again, which Lawrence recovered to seal the game for the Cowboys, who won 24–20. This was the first time in franchise playoff history that Dallas had been down by 10 or more points at halftime and rallied to win the game.

The following week, the Cowboys traveled to Lambeau Field in Green Bay, Wisconsin to play the Green Bay Packers in the Divisional Round. Despite having a 14–7 halftime lead, the Cowboys fell to the Packers 26–21, thus ending their season. The season ended on a controversial overturned call of a completed catch at the 1-yard line by Dez Bryant. The catch was challenged by the Packers, and the referees overturned the call because of the "Calvin Johnson rule".

During the 2015 offseason the Cowboys allowed running back DeMarco Murray to become a free agent. Murray signed with the division rival Philadelphia Eagles. On July 15 wide receiver Dez Bryant signed a 5-year, $70 million contract.

The Cowboys started the 2015 season at home against the New York Giants, in which Dallas won 27–26. Dez Bryant left the game early with a fractured bone in his foot. On the road against the Philadelphia Eagles, Romo suffered a broken left collarbone, the same one he injured in 2010, and Brandon Weeden replaced him. Dallas won 20–10 to begin the season 2–0, but then went on a seven-game losing streak. They finished the season 4–12 and last in their division.

In 2016, after a preseason injury to Tony Romo, rookie quarterback Dak Prescott was slated as the starting quarterback, as Romo was expected to be out 6–8 weeks. In week 1 against the New York Giants, Dallas lost 20–19. After this loss, Dallas would go on an eleven-game winning streak. After much speculation leading to a potential quarterback controversy, Romo made an announcement that Prescott had earned the right to take over as the Cowboys starting quarterback.

In game 10, Romo suited up for the first time in the season and was the backup quarterback. Dallas defeated the Baltimore Ravens to win their 9th straight game, breaking a franchise record of 8 straight games set in 1977. It also marked rookie running back Ezekiel Elliott breaking Tony Dorsett's single-season rushing record for a Cowboys rookie. Prescott also tied an NFL rookie record held by Russell Wilson and Dan Marino by throwing multiple touchdowns in 5 straight games. Dallas finished 13–3, tying their best 16-game regular-season record. While Dallas defeated the Green Bay Packers at Lambeau Field in week 6, the Packers would win at AT&T Stadium in the divisional round of the NFL playoffs on a last-second field goal, ending the Cowboys' season.

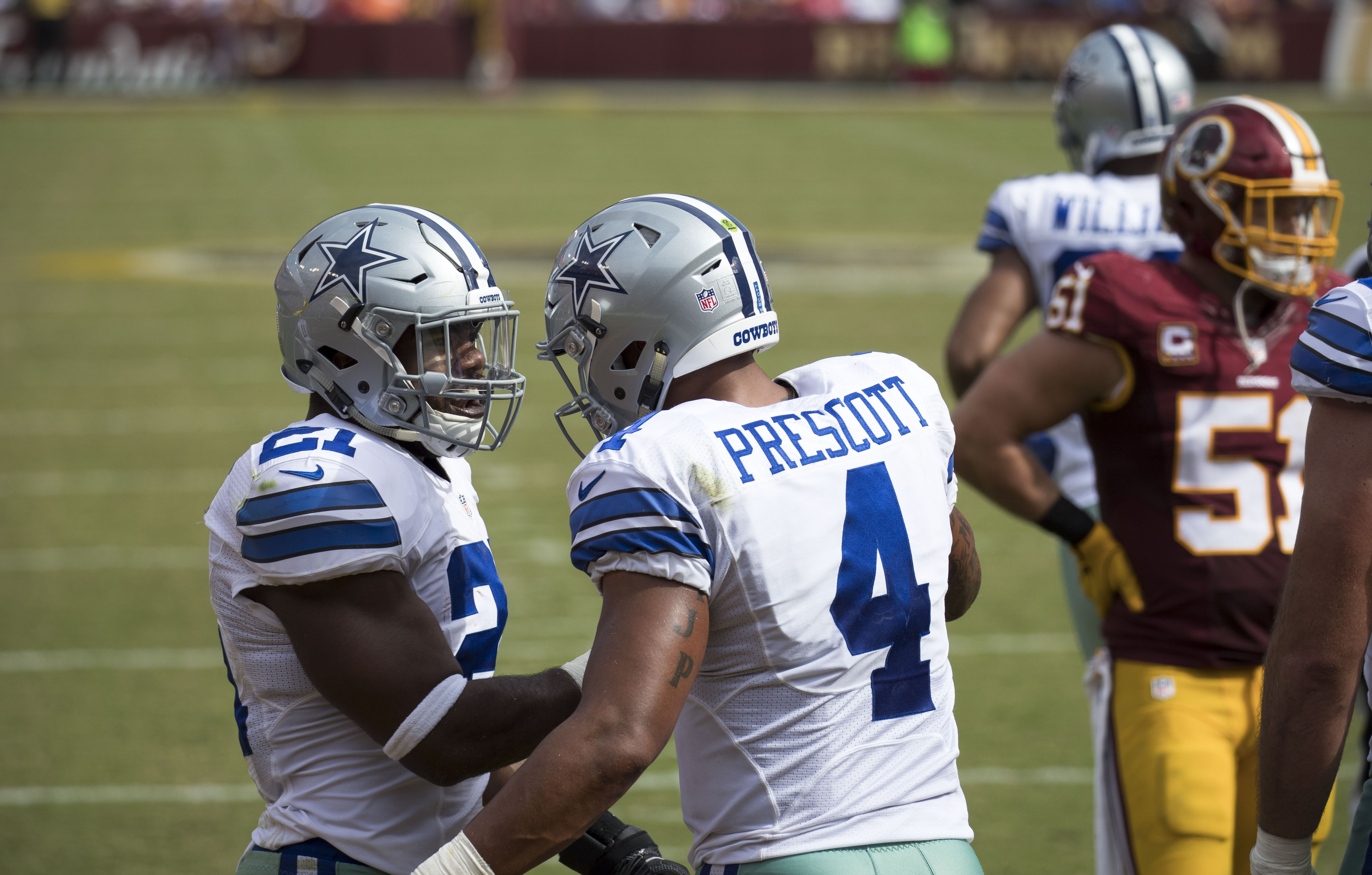
Dak Prescott and Ezekiel Elliott were both Rookie of the Year finalists in 2016 after leading the team to a 13–3 record, with the former winning the award

Dak Prescott was named NFL Rookie of the Year in the NFL honors on February 4, 2017, and Ezekiel Elliott led the league in rushing yards. Jason Garrett was named Coach of the Year. Both Prescott and Elliott made the 2017 Pro Bowl. This is the first time the Cowboys sent two rookies to the Pro Bowl.

2017 was the first season since 2002 without quarterback Tony Romo, who retired on April 4 after 14 seasons with the Cowboys. The season also featured second-year running back Ezekiel Elliott being suspended for 6 games after violating the league's conduct policy. The suspension was to begin at the start of the year but was pushed back to November. The Cowboys finished the year at 9-7 without making the playoffs. Following the season, Dez Bryant was released after eight seasons in Dallas and tight end Jason Witten, who holds several franchise receiving records, retired after 15 seasons, ending an era.

The Dallas Cowboys' 2017 season was the subject of the third season of Amazon's sports documentary series All or Nothing. The series is produced by NFL Films.

In the 2018 season, the Cowboys finished with a 10–6 record and won the NFC East. In the Wild Card Round, the Cowboys defeated the Seattle Seahawks 24–22 before losing 30–22 to the Los Angeles Rams in the Divisional Round.

==== Mike McCarthy years (2020–2024) ====
Following the end of the 2019 season, where the Cowboys missed the playoffs for the 7th time in the last 10 seasons, it was announced that the team had parted ways with longtime head coach Jason Garrett. Both Marvin Lewis (former Bengals coach) and Mike McCarthy (former Packers coach who led Green Bay to a Super Bowl win) were interviewed for the head coaching position.

McCarthy and the Cowboys picked up the first win against the Atlanta Falcons in Week 2. On October 11, the Cowboys' 2020 season was all but lost when quarterback Dak Prescott suffered a grievous ankle injury that ended his season. Despite the loss of Prescott, McCarthy's first year Cowboys still remained in the running for a playoff appearance throughout most of the regular season. They would go on to finish the season with a 6–10 record, which ranked the team third in the NFC East Division. Throughout the 2020 season, the Cowboys' defense struggled massively. Following the season, defensive coordinator Mike Nolan and defensive line coach Jim Tomsula were dismissed.

The Cowboys' 2021 season resulted in the first winning season since 2018, and with the San Francisco 49ers' Week 16 loss to the Tennessee Titans, the Cowboys clinched their first playoff berth also since 2018. Following a Denver Broncos' loss to the Las Vegas Raiders, the Cowboys clinched the NFC East, based on strength-of-victory tiebreakers; this was their first division title since 2018. They swept the NFC East for the first time since 1998. Rookie Micah Parsons was awarded as Defensive Rookie of the Year, and contributed to a league-leading defense. The Cowboys' strong offense finished the year with 530 points, the most in the league, and a team record. They finished the season with a 12–5 record, their best since 2016. But despite high expectations, the Cowboys lost in the wild card round of the playoffs to the San Francisco 49ers 23–17.

The 2022 season saw a repeat of the 12–5 record. Despite losing to the Jacksonville Jaguars in Week 15, the Cowboys clinched a playoff berth after a loss by the Washington Commanders later that day. This marked the first time since 2006–2007 the Cowboys qualified for the postseason in consecutive seasons. Quarterback Dak Prescott was awarded as Walter Payton NFL Man of the Year, for his contributions to the community and charity. In the wild-card round of the playoffs, the Cowboys defeated the Tampa Bay Buccaneers to win their first road playoff game since their Super Bowl-winning 1992 season, and ended their winless streak against Tom Brady in what proved to be Brady's last game in his career. However, they were defeated by the San Francisco 49ers for the second consecutive season, this time in the divisional round, their seventh consecutive divisional round defeat.

On February 16, 2022, a settlement of $2.4 million was paid after four cheerleaders accused Rich Dalrymple, the now-retired senior vice president of public relations and communications, of voyeurism in their locker room as they undressed during a 2015 event at AT&T Stadium.

After the NFL allowed teams to seek blockchain sponsorships, the Cowboys became the first team to do so, signing a multi-year contract with the platform Blockchain.com on April 13, 2022.

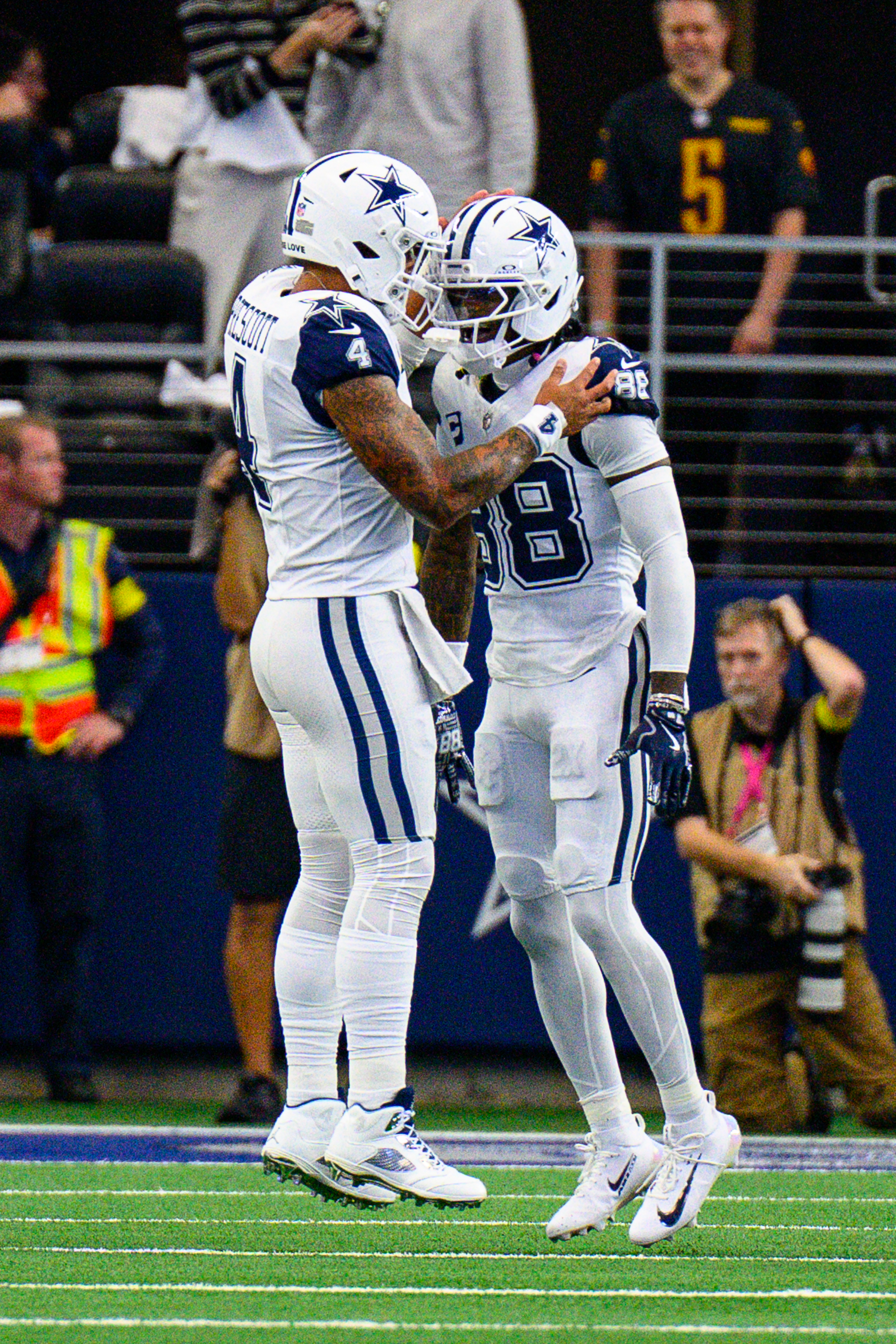
Dak Prescott and CeeDee Lamb led the league in multiple statistical categories in 2023, including passing touchdowns, passing completions, and receptions.

In 2023, the Cowboys again achieved a 12–5 record, for the third year in a row. The team won the NFC East division for the first time since the 2021 season and the second time in three seasons. They ended up in a three-way tie with the San Francisco 49ers and the Detroit Lions for first place in the NFC at 12–5. However, they lost the conference record tiebreaker to the 49ers but won the head to head tiebreaker over the Lions, giving them the second seed in the playoffs. Although the Cowboys lost to the Buffalo Bills in Week 15, they clinched their third straight playoff berth before taking the field when the Green Bay Packers and Atlanta Falcons lost to the Tampa Bay Buccaneers and Carolina Panthers, respectively. This marked the Cowboys' first run of three consecutive postseason appearances since appearing in six straight from 1991 to 1996. However, the Cowboys collapsed in the playoffs, and, despite having one of the best-ranked offenses and defenses of the league, were defeated 48–32 by their rival, seventh-seeded Green Bay Packers in the Wild Card round, at one point trailing 48–16 during the fourth quarter. With the loss, the Cowboys became the first team to lose to a #7 seed since the playoff bracket expanded for the 2020–21 NFL playoffs. This also marked the first time a team failed to reach a Conference Championship Game despite winning at least 12 games in three consecutive seasons. Dak Prescott led the league in passing touchdowns, with 36, and passing completions, with 410, and CeeDee Lamb led the league in receptions, with 135. The latter also set single-season franchise records for receptions and receiving yards.

The 2024 season was their first season since 2020 without Dan Quinn as defensive coordinator, as the Washington Commanders hired him to be their head coach. He was replaced in that role by former Minnesota Vikings head coach Mike Zimmer, who returned to the Cowboys after eighteen years. The Cowboys failed to improve upon their 12–5 record from the past three seasons, and finished the season with a 7–10 record and failed to make the playoffs for the first time since 2020.

On January 13, 2025, it was announced that McCarthy would not be returning as head coach of the Dallas Cowboys due to a contract dispute.

==== Brian Schottenheimer years (2025–present) ====
On January 24, 2025, it was announced that Brian Schottenheimer had been promoted from offensive coordinator to head coach.

The 2025 season was the Cowboys' first season since 2013 without perennial All-Pro guard Zack Martin or defensive end DeMarcus Lawrence. Martin announced his retirement on February 20, and Lawrence signed with the Seattle Seahawks during free agency. This season also marked the departure of All-Pro defensive end Micah Parsons, as the Cowboys traded him to the Green Bay Packers in exchange for defensive tackle Kenny Clark and two first round draft picks amid a contract holdout.

The Cowboys improved upon their 7–10 record from the previous season, with a 7–9–1 record, but missed the playoffs for the second straight season. Despite having the second-best offense in the league, due in part to the arrival of wide receiver George Pickens and running back Javonte Williams, as well as one of the best special teams units led by Brandon Aubrey, the defense was ranked as the league's worst in many statistical categories, most notably points allowed per game, at 551, and touchdowns allowed, at 60, as well as ranking in the bottom three in multiple defensive categories, such as yards allowed. The season also marked franchise record-worsts for points and touchdowns allowed. Defensive coordinator Matt Eberflus was dismissed after a single season.

== Thanksgiving Day games ==
In their seventh season in 1966, the Cowboys agreed to host a second NFL Thanksgiving game; the tradition of a team hosting on Thanksgiving had been popularized by the Detroit Lions (who had hosted a game on the day mostly un-interrupted since moving to Detroit in 1934). General manager Tex Schramm wanted to find a way to boost publicity on a national level for his team, which had struggled for most of the 1960s. In fact, the NFL guaranteed a cut of the gate revenue in the belief that the game would not be a hit because of said struggle. With a kickoff just after 5 p.m. CST, over eighty thousand fans (and millions viewing on CBS) saw the Cowboys beat the Cleveland Browns 26–14 at the Cotton Bowl.

In 1975 and 1977, at the behest of Commissioner Pete Rozelle, the St. Louis Cardinals replaced Dallas as a host team. Dallas then hosted St. Louis in 1976 in an effort by the NFL to give St. Louis national exposure. Although the Cardinals, at the time known as the "Cardiac Cards" due to their propensity for winning very close games, were a modest success at the time, the games did not prove as successful. Owing to factors that ranged from ugly contests to opposition from the Kirkwood–Webster Groves Turkey Day Game (a local high school football contest) led to Dallas resuming regular hosting duties in 1978. It was then, after Rozelle asked Dallas to resume hosting Thanksgiving games, that the Cowboys requested (and received) an agreement guaranteeing the Cowboys a spot on Thanksgiving Day for good; as such, the Cowboys play in the late afternoon.

== Logos and uniforms ==
=== Logo ===
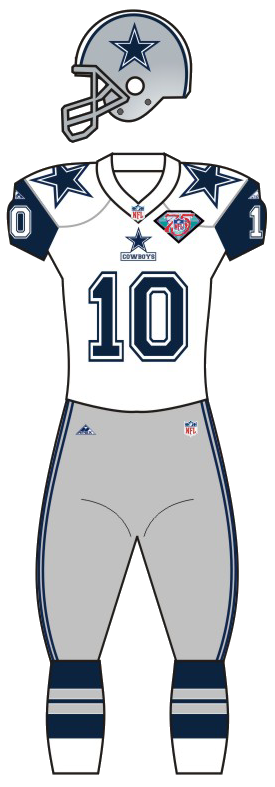
The throwback double-star uniforms introduced in 1994 for the NFL's 75th Anniversary

The Dallas Cowboys' blue star logo, which represents Texas as "The Lone Star State", is one of the most well-known team logos in professional sports. The blue star originally was a solid shape until a white line and blue border were added in 1964. The logo has remained the same since. Today, the blue star has been extended to not only the Dallas Cowboys, but owner Jerry Jones' defunct AFL team, the Dallas Desperados that used a similar logo based on that of the Cowboys. The blue star also is used on other entries like an imaging facility and storage facility.

=== Uniforms ===
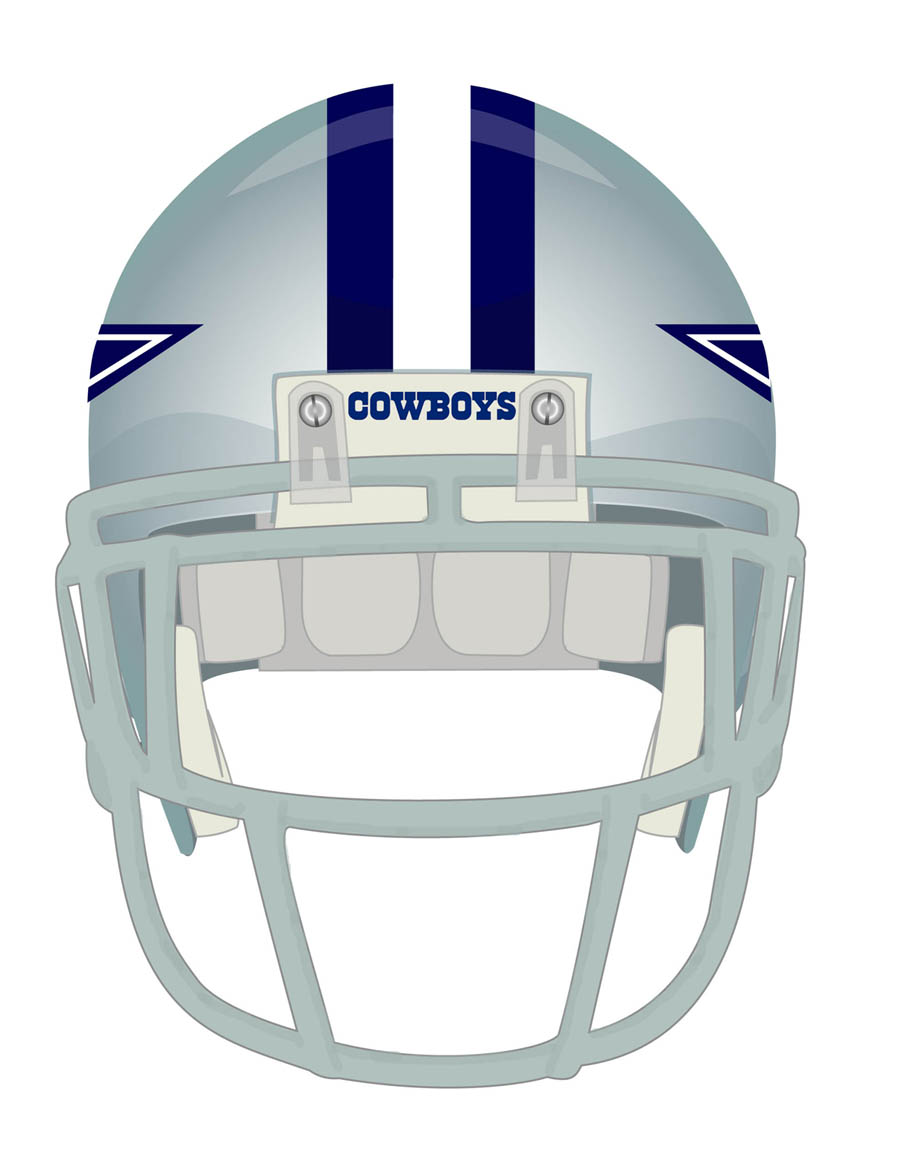

Back of Dallas Cowboys helmet

Front and back of Cowboys helmet

The Dallas Cowboys' white home jersey has royal blue (PMS 287 C) solid socks, numbers, lettering, and two stripes on the sleeves outlined in black. The home pants are a common metallic silver-green color (PMS 8280 C) that helps bring out the blue in the uniform. The navy (PMS 289 C) road jerseys (nicknamed the "Stars and Stripes" jersey) have white lettering and numbers with navy pinstripes. A white/gray/white stripe is on each sleeve as well as the collared V-neck, and a Cowboys star logo is placed upon the stripes. A "Cowboys" chest crest is directly under the NFL shield. The away pants are a pearlish metallic-silver color (PMS 8180 C) and like the home pants, enhance the navy in the uniforms. The team uses a serifed font for the lettered player surnames on the jersey nameplates.

The team's helmets are also a unique silver with a tint of blue known as "Metallic Silver Blue" (PMS 8240 C) and have a blue/white/blue vertical stripe placed upon the center of the crown. The Cowboys also include a unique, if subtle, feature on the back of the helmet: a blue strip of Dymo tape with the player's name embossed, placed on the white portion of the stripe at the back of the helmet.

==== Home and away uniform history ====
1960 uniforms

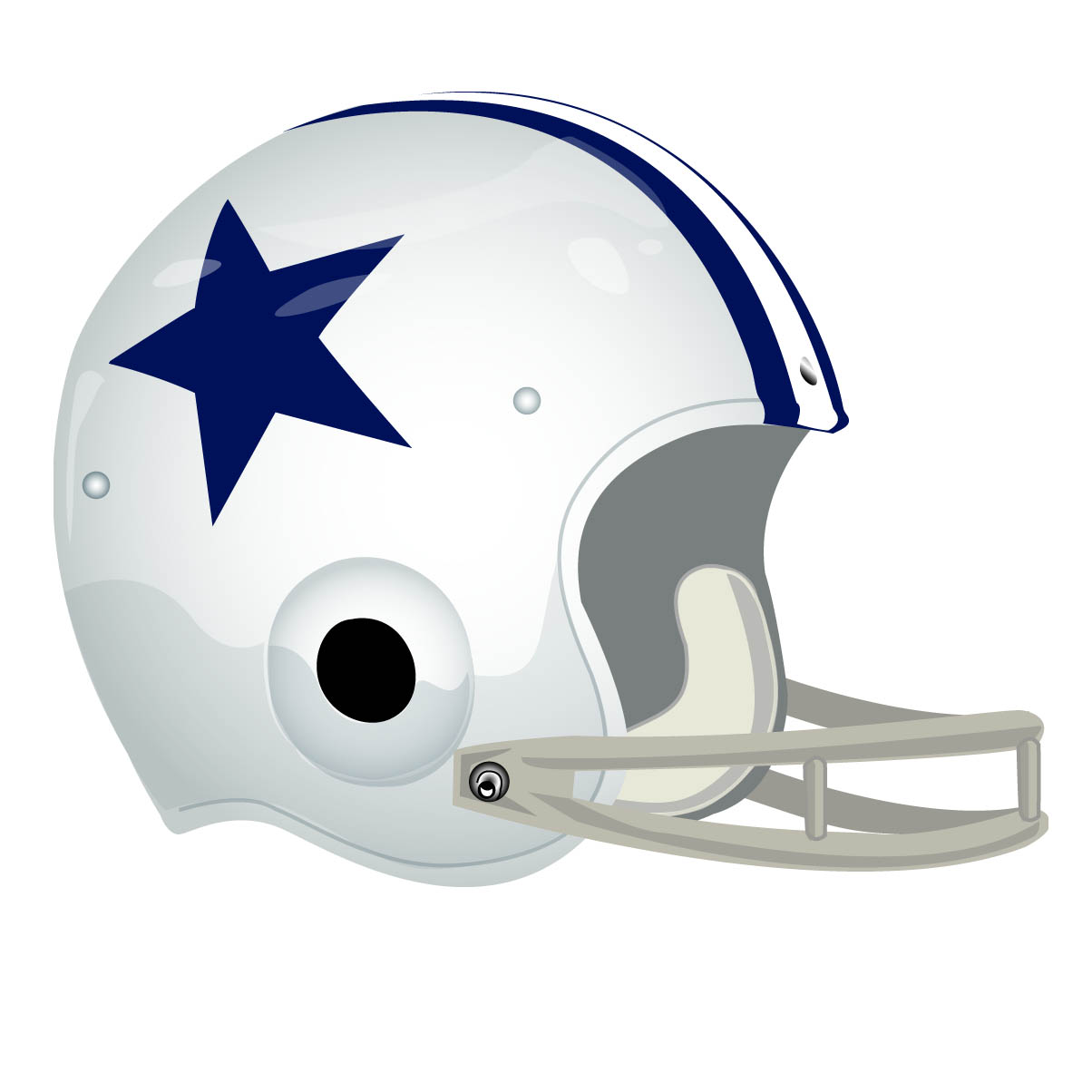
Helmet

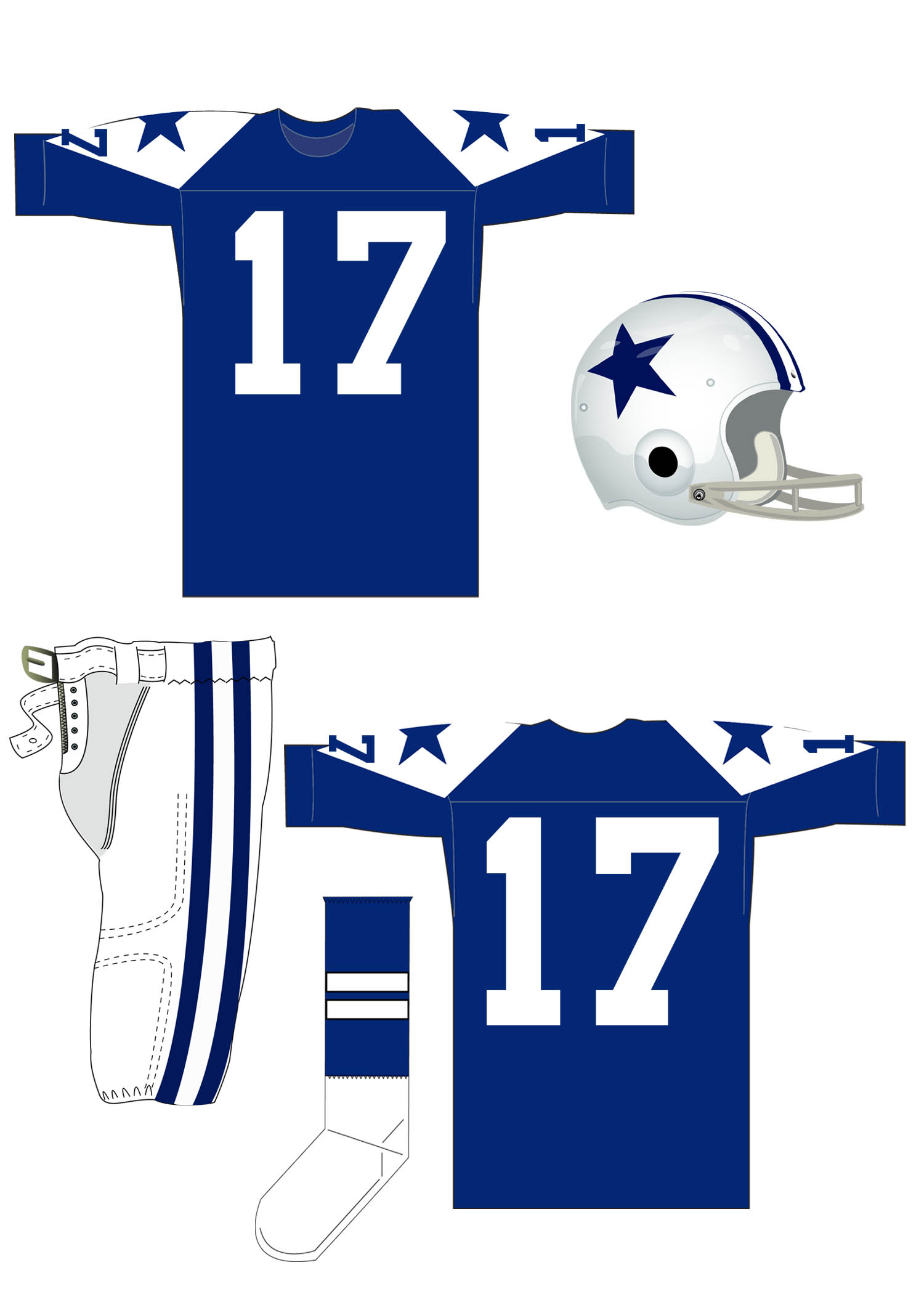
Blue home

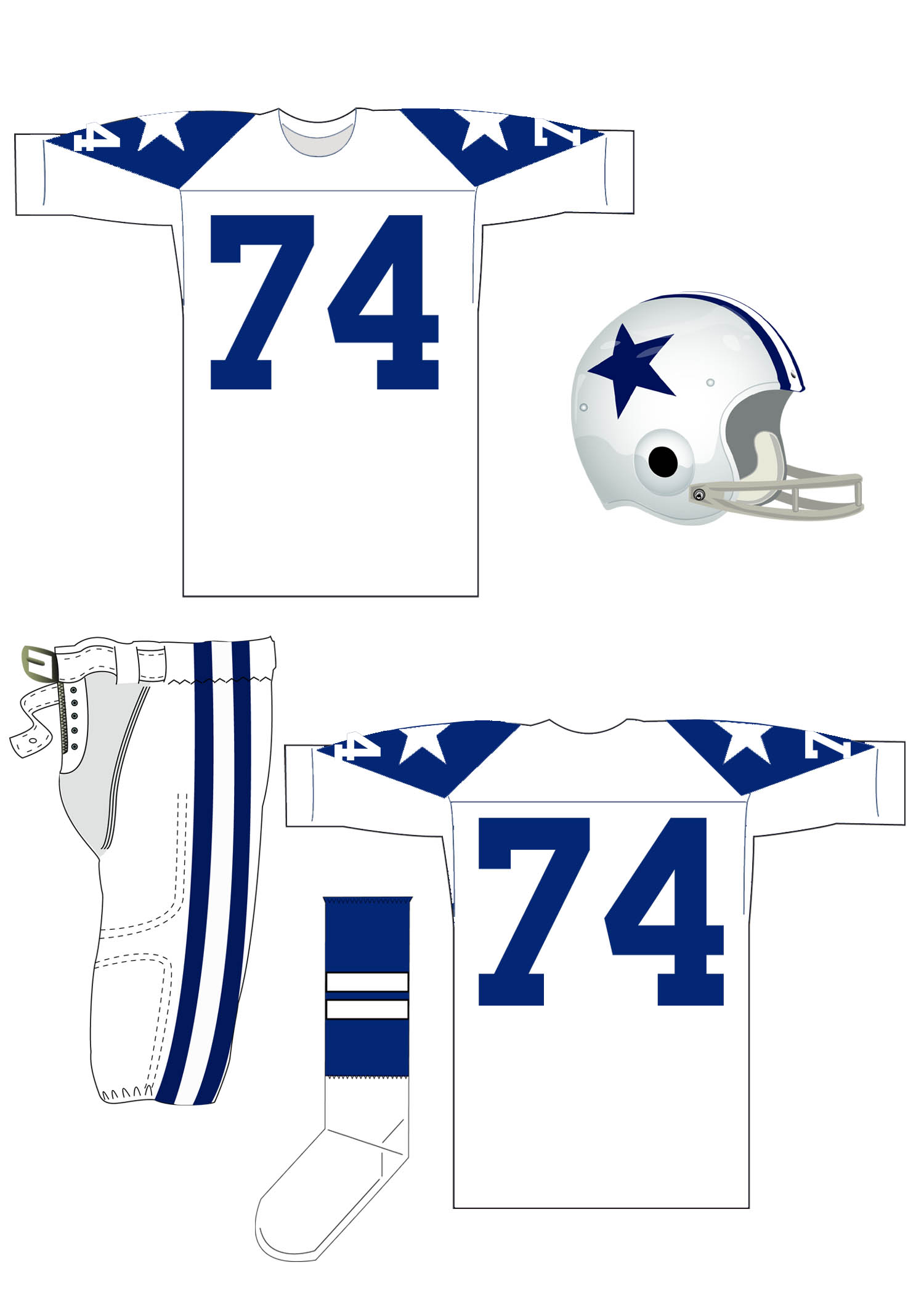
White away

1964 uniforms

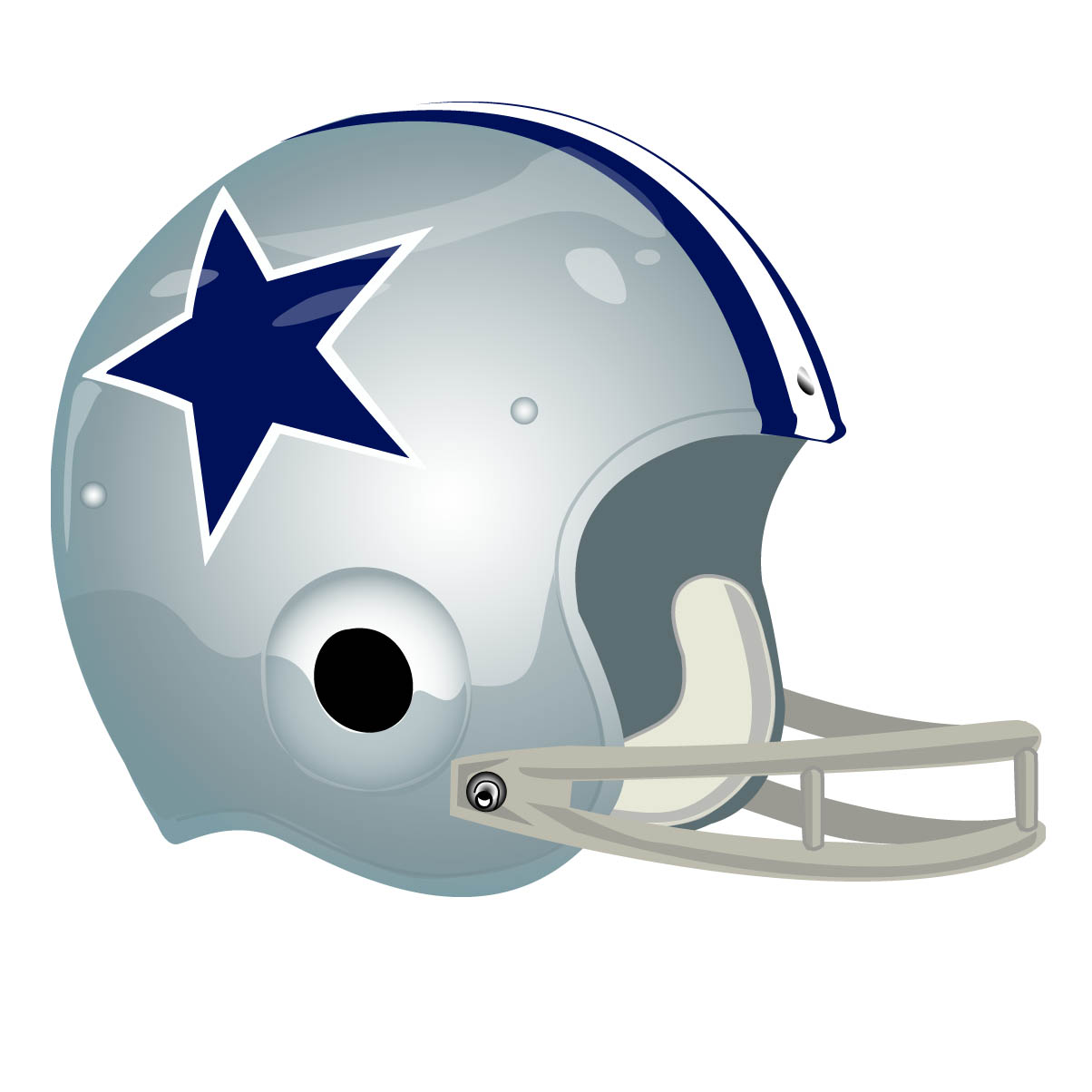
Helmet

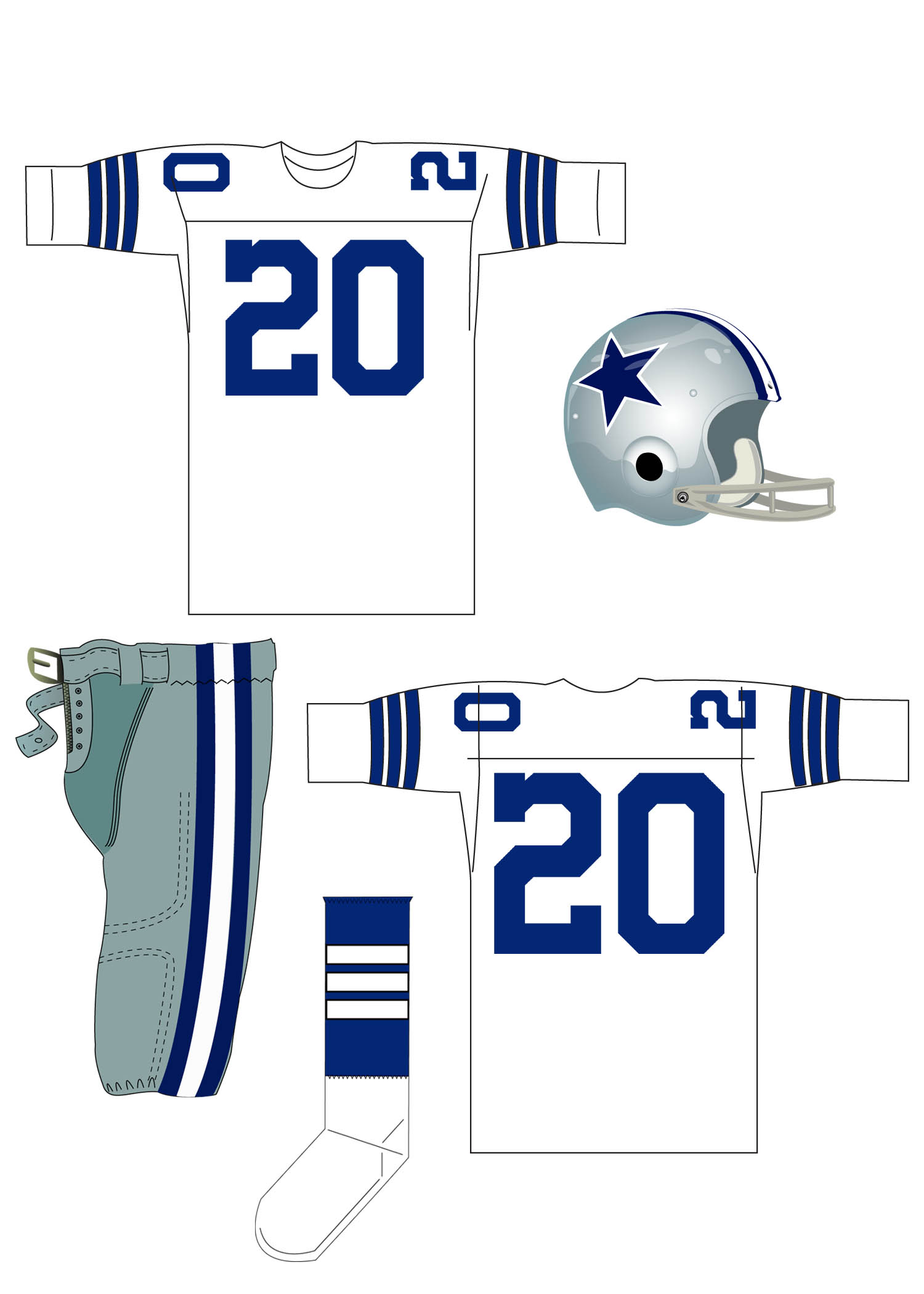
White home

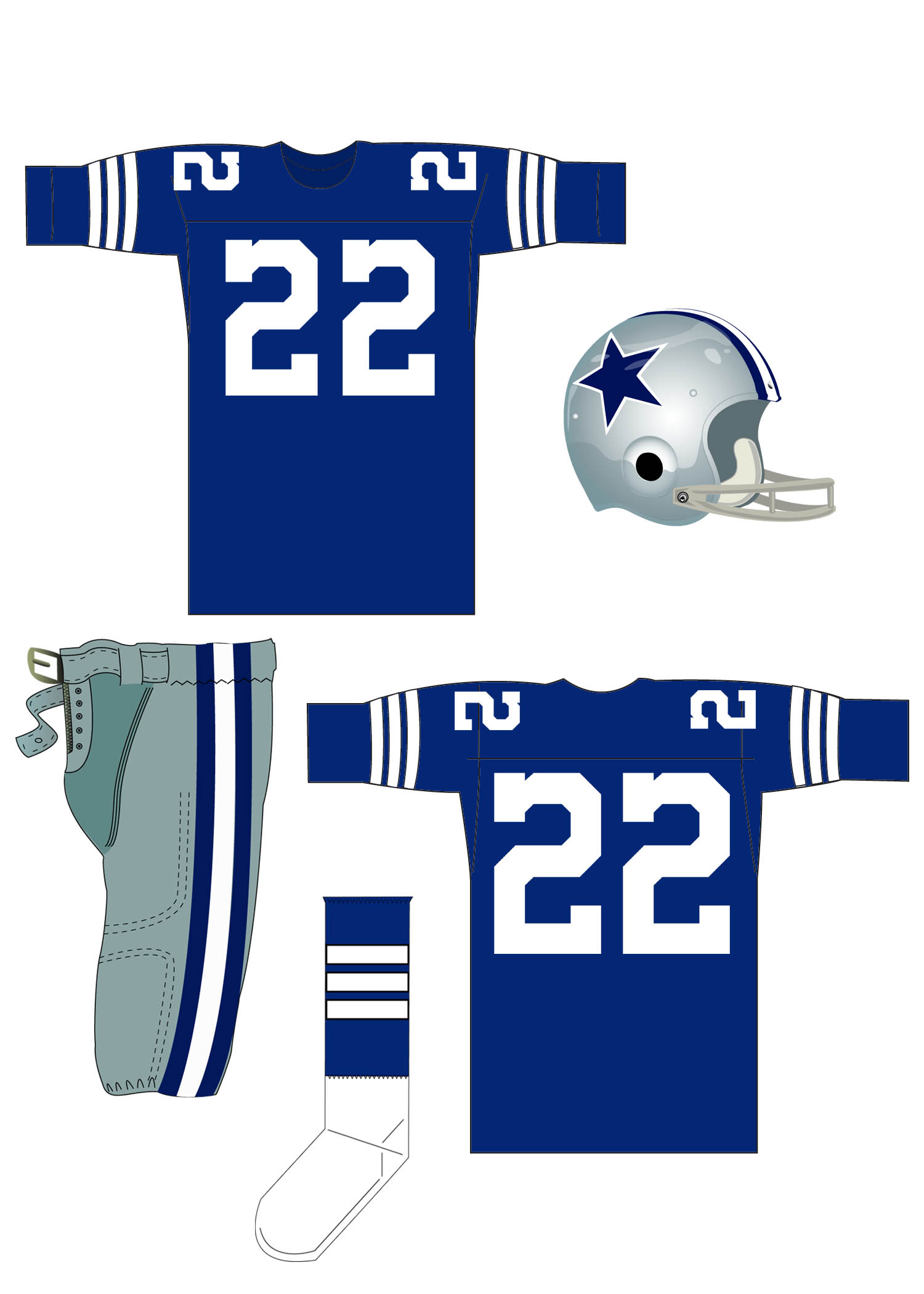
Blue away

When the Dallas Cowboys franchise debuted in 1960, the team's uniform included a white helmet adorned with a simple blue star and a blue-white-blue stripe down the center crown. The team donned blue jerseys with white sleeves and a small blue star on each shoulder for home games and the negative opposite for away games. Their socks also had two horizontal white stripes overlapping the blue.

In 1964, the Cowboys opted for a simpler look (adopting essentially the team's current uniform) by changing their jersey/socks to one solid color with three horizontal stripes on the sleeves; the white jersey featured royal blue stripes with a narrow black border, the royal blue jersey white stripes with the same black outline. The star-shouldered jerseys were eliminated; "TV" numbers appeared just above the jersey stripes. The new helmet was silver-blue, with a blue-white-blue tri-stripe down the center (the middle white stripe was thicker). The blue "lone star" logo was retained, but with a white border setting it off from the silver/blue. The new pants were silver/blue, with a blue-white-blue tri-stripe. In 1964, the NFL allowed teams to wear white jerseys at home; several teams did so, and the Cowboys have worn white at home ever since, except on certain and special "throwback" days.

In 1966, the team modified the jerseys, which now featured only two sleeve stripes, slightly wider; the socks followed the same pattern. In 1967 the "lone star" helmet decal added a blue outline to the white-bordered star, giving the logo a bigger, bolder look. The logo and this version of the uniform have seen little change to the present day.

The only notable changes from 1970 to the present were:

- 1970 to 1973: The "TV" numbers were moved from the shoulders to the sleeves above the stripes (the TV numbers returned to the shoulders on the white jerseys in 1974, but remained on the sleeves of the blue jerseys through 1978).
- 1982 to 1988: The pants featured a white uniform number in an elliptical blue circle worn near the hip.
- the removal of the indented serifs on the front and back jersey numbers in the early 1980s (seen currently on the throwback jersey)
- 1980: The blue jersey was rendered in a slightly darker shade than the 1964–79 version; from 1981 to 1994 the dark jerseys sported numbers that were gray with white borders and a blue pinstripe. The stripes on the sleeves and socks also used the same gray with white border scheme (sans navy pinstripe).
- 1982 to present: Player names on jersey backs, which were originally in block-letter style, were slightly smaller and in a footed "serif" style.
- 1996 to present: The blue jersey features white/gray/white stripes on each sleeve and the collared V-neck, the Cowboys star logo placed upon the sleeve stripes, white lettering and numbers with navy pinstripes, and the "Cowboys" wordmark in the center of the neckline. The "Cowboys" wordmark was also placed at that same spot on the white jersey from 1996 to 1998.

During the 1976 season, the blue-white-blue stripe on the crown of the helmets was temporarily changed to red-white-blue to commemorate the United States' bicentennial anniversary. This stripe configuration returned in 2021 and is now worn for one regular season game annually when the team pays tribute to Medal of Honor recipients.

In 1994, the NFL celebrated their 75th Anniversary, and the Dallas Cowboys celebrated their back-to-back Super Bowl titles by unveiling a white "Double-Star" jersey on Thanksgiving Day. This jersey was used for special occasions and was worn throughout the 1994–95 playoffs. During the same season, the Cowboys also wore their 1960–63 road jersey with a silver helmet for one game as part of a league-wide "throwback" policy.

During the 1995 season, the team wore the navy "Double-Star" jersey for games at Washington and Philadelphia and permanently switched to solid color socks (royal blue for the white uniform, and navy blue for the dark uniform). The navy "Double-Star" jersey was not seen again until the NFL's Classic Throwback Weekend on Thanksgiving Day 2001–2003.

In 2004, the Cowboys resurrected their original 1960–1963 uniform on Thanksgiving Day. This uniform became the team's alternate or "third jersey" and was usually worn at least once a year, primarily Thanksgiving Day. Two exceptions were when the Cowboys wore their normal white uniforms on Thanksgiving in 2007 and 2008. While the team didn't wear the throwback uniform exactly on Thanksgiving Day in those two years, Dallas wore them on a date around Thanksgiving for those two years. In 2007 Dallas wore the throwback uniform on November 29, 2007, against the Green Bay Packers. In 2008 Dallas wore the throwback uniform on November 23, 2008, against the San Francisco 49ers. The team went back to wearing this uniform at home on Thanksgiving Day in 2009 while their opponent was the Oakland Raiders who wore their AFL Legacy Weekend throwbacks. Dallas wore this alternate uniform on October 11, 2009, as part of one of the NFL's AFL Legacy Weekends when they traveled to Kansas City to play the Chiefs who were sporting their AFL Dallas Texans' uniforms. This created a rare game in which neither team wore a white jersey and the first time the Cowboys wore the alternative uniform as a visiting team. The 1960–1963 uniform may also be used on other special occasions. Other instances include the 2005 Monday Night game against the Washington Redskins when the team inducted Troy Aikman, Emmitt Smith, and Michael Irving into the Cowboys Ring of Honor, and the 2006 Christmas Day game against the Philadelphia Eagles.

In 2013, the NFL issued a new helmet rule stating that players would no longer be allowed to use alternate helmets due to the league's enhanced concussion awareness. This caused the Cowboys' white 1960s throwback helmets to become non-compliant. However, this rule became moot in 2022 when the NFL once again allowed teams to use an alternate helmet again, and the Cowboys reintroduced the 1960s white helmet.

During the "one-shell era", in 2013, 2014, 2016, and 2017, the team wore their normal blue jerseys at home for Thanksgiving; the only exceptions were in 2015 and 2020 when the Cowboys wore the "Color Rush" uniforms (see below), and in 2018, 2019 and 2021 when they wore their regular white uniforms. In 2017, the team initially announced that they will wear blue jerseys at home on a more regular basis, only to rescind soon after.

In 2015, the Cowboys released their Color Rush uniform, featuring a variation of the 1990s "Double Star" alternates with white pants and socks. The uniform was first used in a Thanksgiving game against the Carolina Panthers and in subsequent Thursday Night Football games since 2016. In 2022, the "Color Rush" uniforms would be worn with a white helmet; this design would emulate their current silver helmets but without any silver elements.

The Cowboys also unveiled a navy uniform-white pants combination which was first used on December 10, 2017, against the Giants. On Christmas Day in 2025 at the Commanders, the Cowboys wore this combination with their "Arctic White" alternate helmets; this was after the NFL allowed teams to wear their alternate helmets with the primary uniforms and vice versa.

In 1964, Tex Schramm started the tradition of the Cowboys wearing their white jersey at home, contrary to an unofficial rule that teams should wear colored jerseys at home. Schramm did this because he wanted fans to see a variety of opponents' colors at home games.

According to current Cowboys' Equipment Director, Mike McCord, another reason why the team chose to wear white uniforms at home was because of the intense Texas heat during the early part of the season at Texas Stadium.

Throughout the years, the Cowboys' blue jersey has been popularly viewed to be "jinxed" because the team often seemed to lose when they wore them. This purported curse drew attention after the team lost Super Bowl V with the blue jerseys. However, the roots of the curse likely date back earlier to the 1968 divisional playoffs, when the blue-shirted Cowboys were upset by the Cleveland Browns in what turned out to be Don Meredith's final game with the Cowboys. Another example was a 1976 regular season road game against the St. Louis Cardinals, in which the Cardinals elected to wear white as the home team and promptly defeated the then-undefeated Cowboys 21–17 for their first loss in six games.

Since the white home uniform tradition began in 1964, the only season Dallas never wore blue uniforms in a regular season game was in the 1972 season, even though they wore them thrice in the preseason. The only other times Dallas wore blue in one regular season game came in 1968, 1975, 1976, 1977, 1998, 2010, and 2020. Conversely, the 2019 season saw Dallas wear their blue uniforms eight times, the most of any season.

Since the 1970 NFL-AFL merger, league rules were changed to allow the Super Bowl home team to pick their choice of jersey. Most of the time, Dallas will wear their blue jerseys when they visit Washington, Philadelphia (sometimes), Miami, or one of the handful of other teams that traditionally wear their white jerseys at home during the first half of the season due to the hot climates in their respective cities or other means. Occasionally opposing teams will wear their white jerseys at home to try to invoke the curse, such as when the Philadelphia Eagles hosted the Cowboys in the 1980 NFC Championship Game, as well as their November 4, 2007, meeting. Various other teams followed suit in the 1980s.

Although Dallas has made several tweaks to their blue jerseys over the years, Schramm said he did not believe in the curse. Since the league began allowing teams to use an alternate jersey, the Cowboys' alternates have been primarily blue versions of past jerseys and the Cowboys have generally had success when wearing these blue alternates. With the implementation of the 2013 NFL helmet rule for alternate jerseys, the team decided instead to wear their regular blue jerseys for their Thanksgiving game, something they have not done at home since Schramm started the white-jersey-at-home tradition.

As of the 2025 season, the Cowboys have a cumulative 101–104–3 regular season record in their blue uniforms. They are also 17–14 at home while wearing the blue uniforms since 2001. The Cowboys also sport a 9–5 record when wearing the primary blue uniform/white pants combination since its 2017 debut.

The Cowboys are 2–6 in playoff games while wearing the blue uniforms. The only victories with the blue uniforms came in the 1978 NFC Championship Game against the Los Angeles Rams, and the 2022 NFC Wild Card Round against the Tampa Bay Buccaneers.

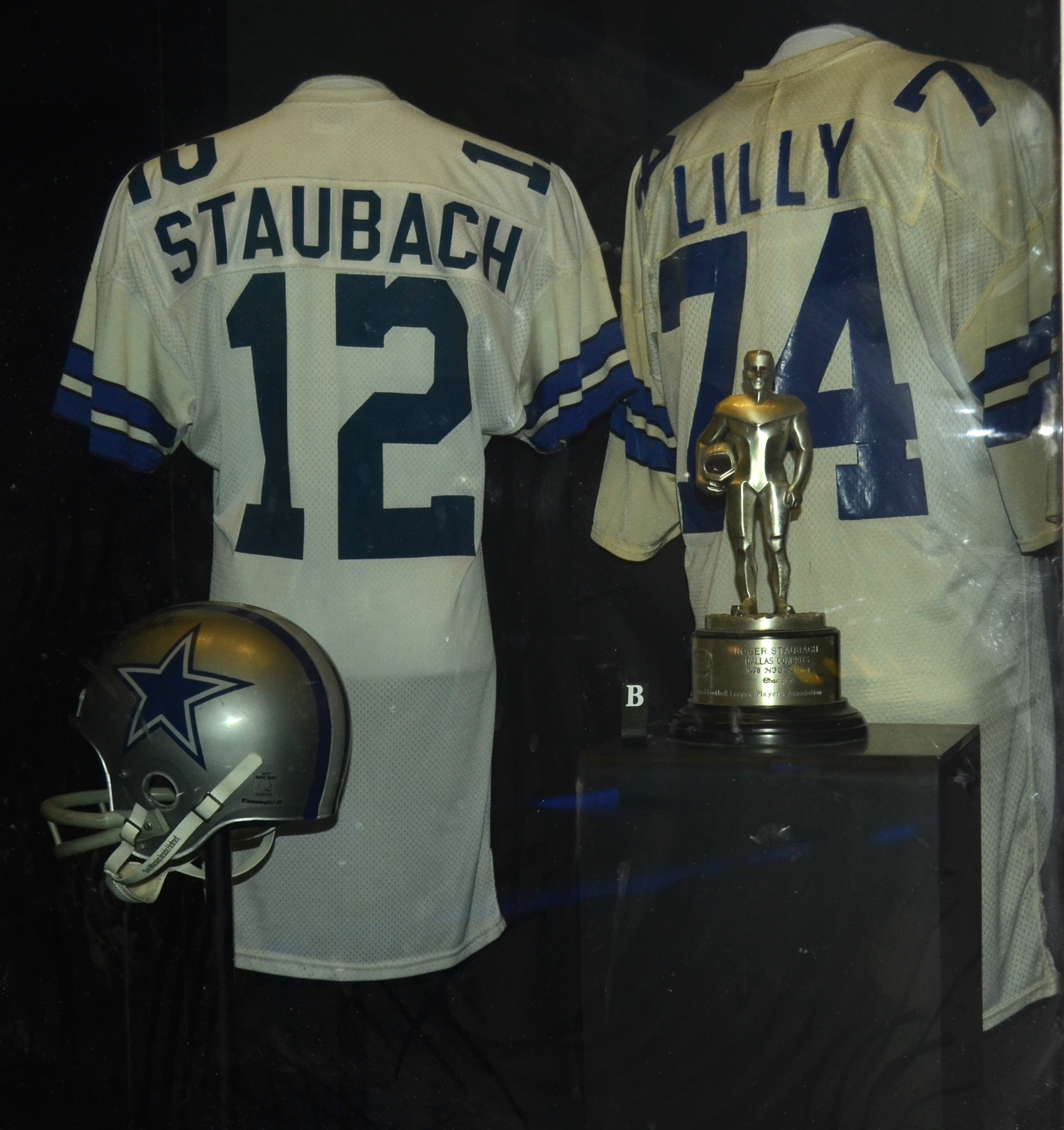
Roger Staubach and Bob Lilly jerseys shown at the Pro Football Hall of Fame in Canton, Ohio

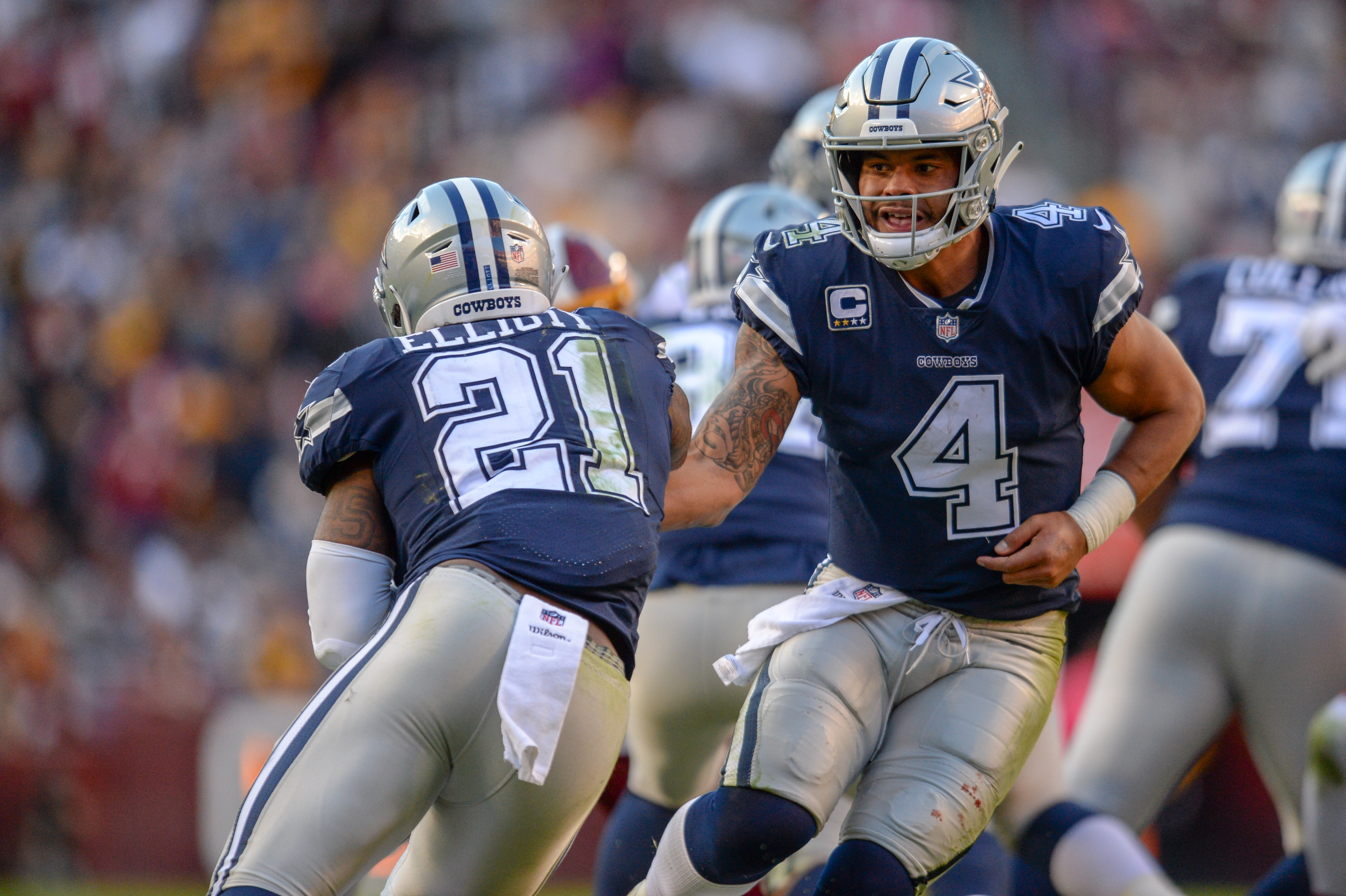
Quarterback Dak Prescott handing the ball off to running back Ezekiel Elliott, both in the blue jerseys during a 2018 game

==== Thanksgiving Day uniforms ====
With the Dallas Cowboys traditionally hosting Thanksgiving Day games, the team donned new uniforms when they unveiled their white "Double-Star" jersey for the first time on November 24, 1994. This game later became synonymous with future Cowboys Head Coach (2010–2019); then 3rd string Quarterback Jason Garrett as he led a come-from-behind victory against the Green Bay Packers.

In the 2004 season, the team went further into Cowboys history by choosing to don blue jerseys worn in their first 4 years of existence, which included white helmets and pants. However, keeping consistent with modern marketing, navy blue was used for this version as opposed to the original 1960-1963 royal color jersey. Aside from the 2007 and 2008 seasons, the Cowboys continued to use this "throwback" uniform through Thanksgiving Day 2012.

Before the start of the 2013 season, the NFL announced a "One-helmet" rule to help prevent potential player concussions. This regulation also prevented the Cowboys from pairing the white helmets with the throwback uniforms, as the team will often use the traditional silver-blue as their primary helmets throughout the season.

In the 2015 season, the Cowboys chose to wear a variation of the 1994 "Double-Star" jersey as their Color Rush on Thanksgiving Day against the Carolina Panthers on November 26, 2015. Since then, the Color Rush was only used again on Thanksgiving against the Washington Football Team on November 26, 2020. In all other seasons, the team opted to wear their standard white or blue uniforms.

In 2022, the NFL restored the use of alternate helmets and the Cowboys reinstated the white helmet and navy 'throwback" uniforms on November 24, 2022, against the New York Giants.

== Stadiums ==
=== Cotton Bowl ===
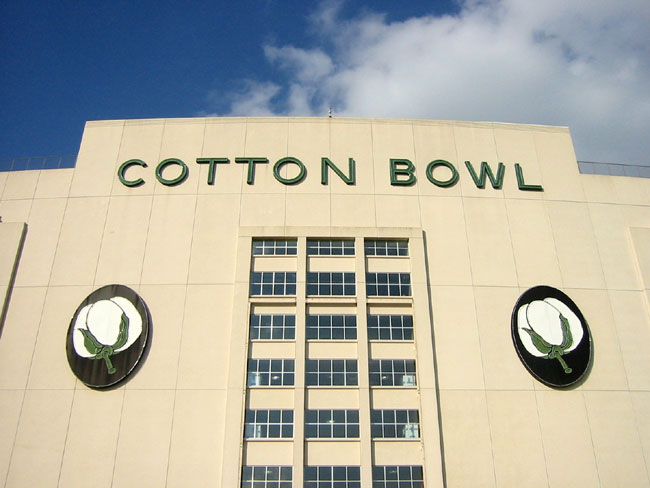
The main entrance to the Cotton Bowl in Dallas

The Cotton Bowl is a stadium which opened in 1932 and became known as "The House That Doak Built" due to the immense crowds that former SMU running back Doak Walker drew to the stadium during his college career in the late 1940s. Originally known as the Fair Park Bowl, it is located in Fair Park, site of the State Fair of Texas. Concerts or other events using a stage allow the playing field to be used for additional spectators. The Cotton Bowl was the longtime home of the annual Cotton Bowl Classic college football bowl game, for which the stadium is named. (Beginning with the January 2010 game, the Cotton Bowl Classic has been played at AT&T Stadium in Arlington.) The Dallas Cowboys called the Cotton Bowl home for 11 years, from the team's formation in 1960 until 1971, when the Cowboys moved to Texas Stadium. It is the only Cowboys stadium within the Dallas city limits. The Cowboys hosted the Green Bay Packers for the 1966 NFL Championship at the Cotton Bowl.

=== Texas Stadium ===
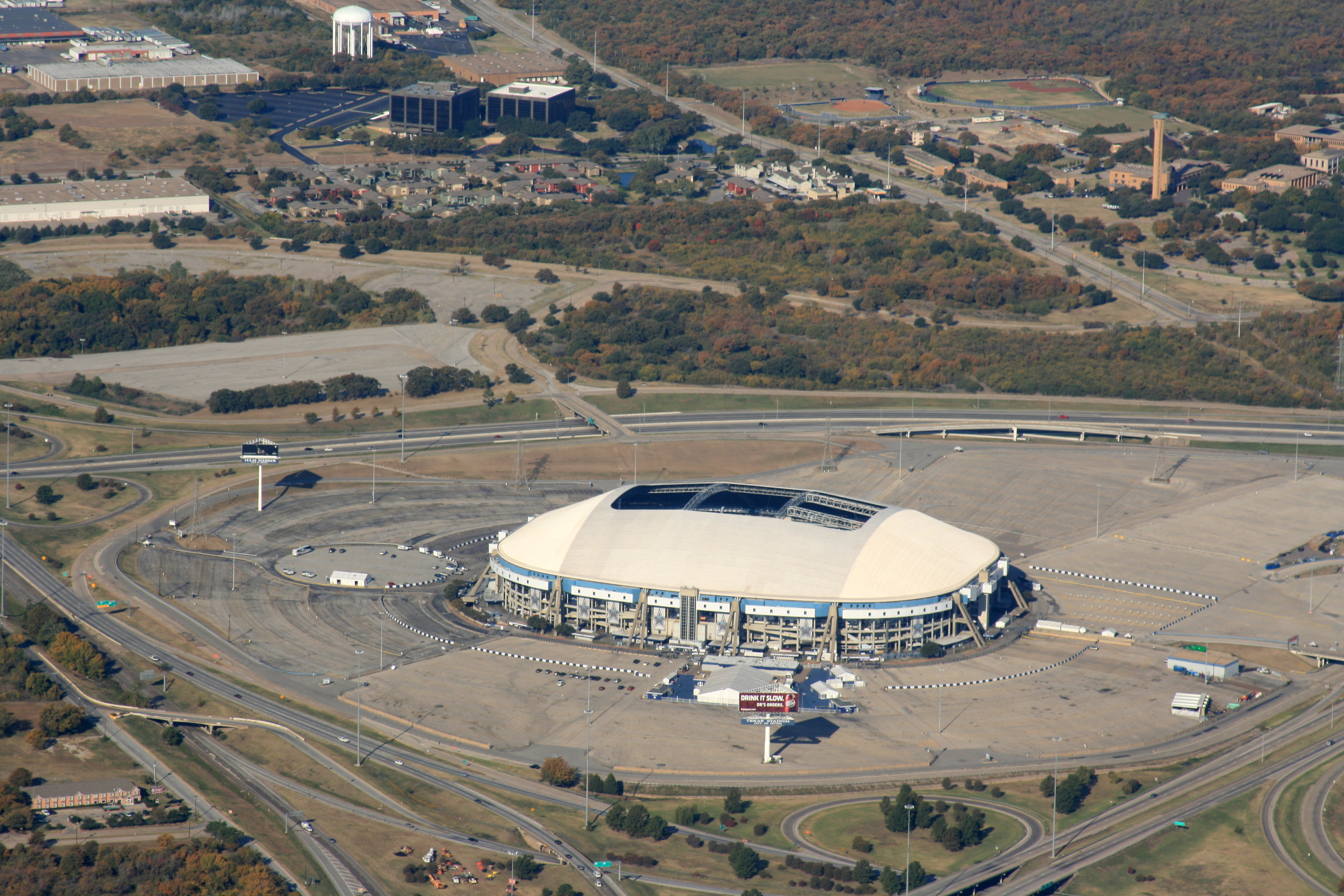
The outside of Texas Stadium in Irving, Texas

For the majority of the franchise's history the Cowboys played their home games at Texas Stadium. Just outside the city of Dallas, the stadium was located in Irving, Texas. The stadium opened on October 24, 1971, at a cost of $35 million and with a seating capacity of 65,675. The stadium was famous for its hole-in-the-roof dome. The roof's worn paint had become so unsightly in the early 2000s that it was repainted in the summer of 2006 by the City of Irving. It was the first time the famed roof was repainted since Texas Stadium opened. The roof was structurally independent from the stadium it covered. The Cowboys lost their final game at Texas Stadium to the Baltimore Ravens, 33–24, on December 20, 2008. After Cowboys Stadium was opened in 2009, the Cowboys turned over the facility to the City of Irving.

In 2009, it was replaced as home of the Cowboys by Cowboys Stadium, which officially opened on May 27, 2009, in Arlington. Texas Stadium was demolished by implosion on April 11, 2010.

=== AT&T Stadium ===
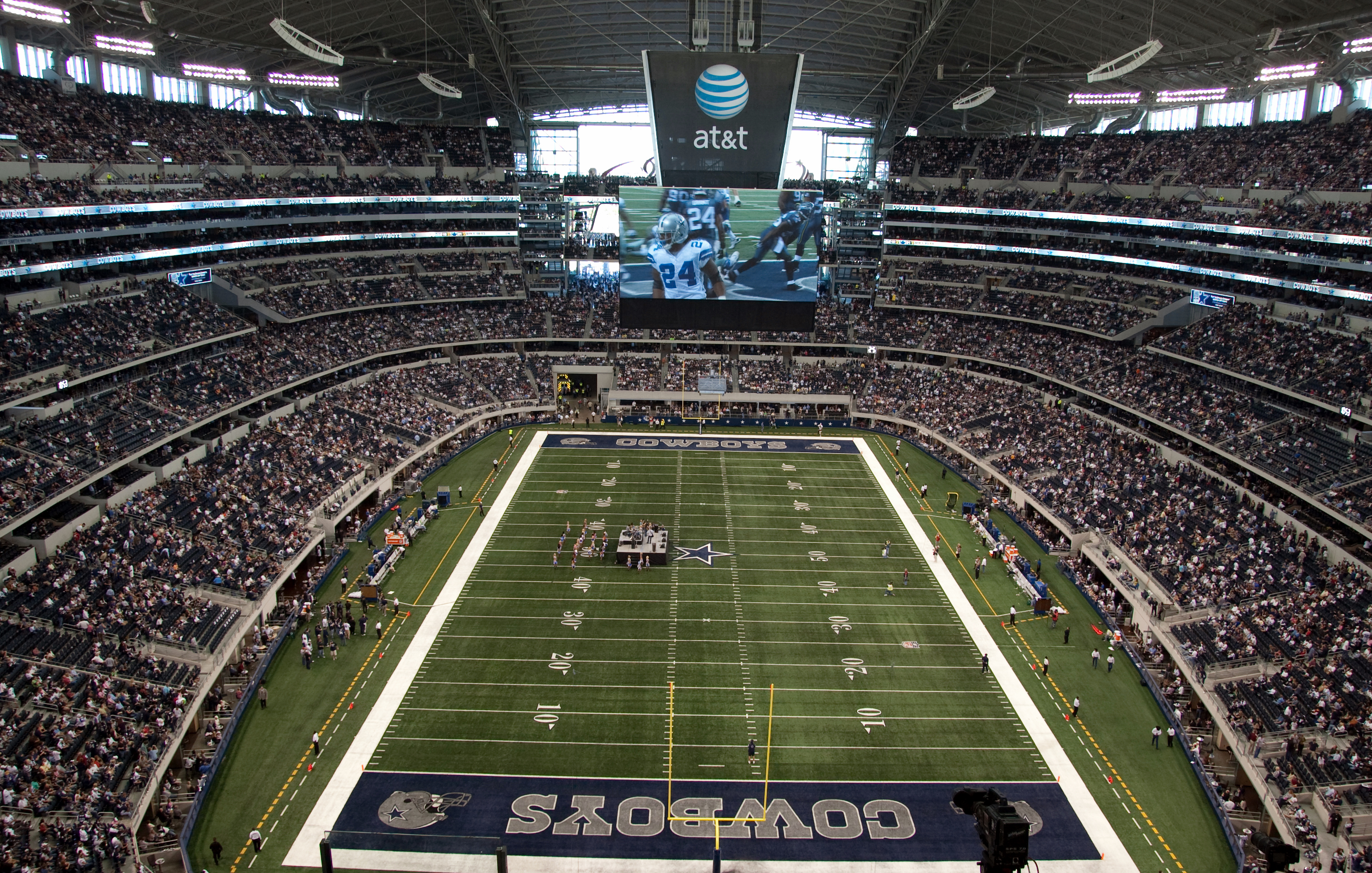
AT&T Stadium (located in Arlington, Texas) during a game

AT&T Stadium, previously named Cowboys Stadium, is a domed stadium with a retractable roof in Arlington, Texas. After failed negotiations to build a new stadium on the site of the Cotton Bowl, Jerry Jones, along with the city of Arlington, funded the stadium at a cost of $1.3 billion. The stadium is located in Tarrant County, Texas, the first time the Cowboys has called a stadium home outside of Dallas County. It was completed on May 29, 2009, and seats 80,000, but is expandable to seat up to 100,000. AT&T Stadium is among the largest domed stadiums in the world.

A highlight of AT&T Stadium is its gigantic, center-hung high-definition television screen, at one point the largest in the world. The 160 by 72 feet (49 by 22 m), 11,520-square-foot (1,070 m^{2}) scoreboard surpassed the 8,736 ft^{2} (812 m^{2}) screen that opened in 2009 at the renovated Kauffman Stadium in Kansas City as the world's largest. In 2011, Charlotte Motor Speedway unveiled its plans for a new HDTV screen larger than the one in AT&T Stadium; that larger screen has since been completed.

At the debut pre-season game of Cowboys Stadium, a punt by Tennessee Titans kicker, A. J. Trapasso, hit the 2,100 in. screen above the field. The punt deflected and was ruled in-play until Titans coach Jeff Fisher informed the officials that the punt struck the scoreboard. (Many believe Trapasso was trying to hit the suspended scoreboard, based on replays and the angle of the kick.) The scoreboard is, however, within the regulation of the NFL guidelines – hanging approximately five feet above the minimum height. No punts hit the scoreboard during the entire 2009 regular season during an actual game. Also, on August 22, 2009, the day after AJ Trapasso hit the screen, many fans touring the facility noted that half of the field was removed with large cranes re-positioning the screen. According to some fans, a tour guide explained that Jerry Jones invited a few professional soccer players to drop kick soccer balls to try to hit the screen. Once he observed them hitting it consistently he had the screen moved up another 10 feet.

The first regular season home game of the 2009 season was against the New York Giants. A league record-setting 105,121 fans showed up to fill Cowboys Stadium for the game before which the traditional "blue star" at the 50-yard line was unveiled for the first time; however, the Cowboys lost in the final seconds, 33–31.

The Cowboys got their first regular-season home win on September 28, 2009. They beat the Carolina Panthers 21–7 with 90,588 in attendance. The game was televised on ESPN's Monday Night Football and marked a record 42nd win for the Cowboys on Monday Night Football.

On July 25, 2013, the Cowboys announced that AT&T would be taking over the rights to the name of the stadium.

== Training camp sites ==
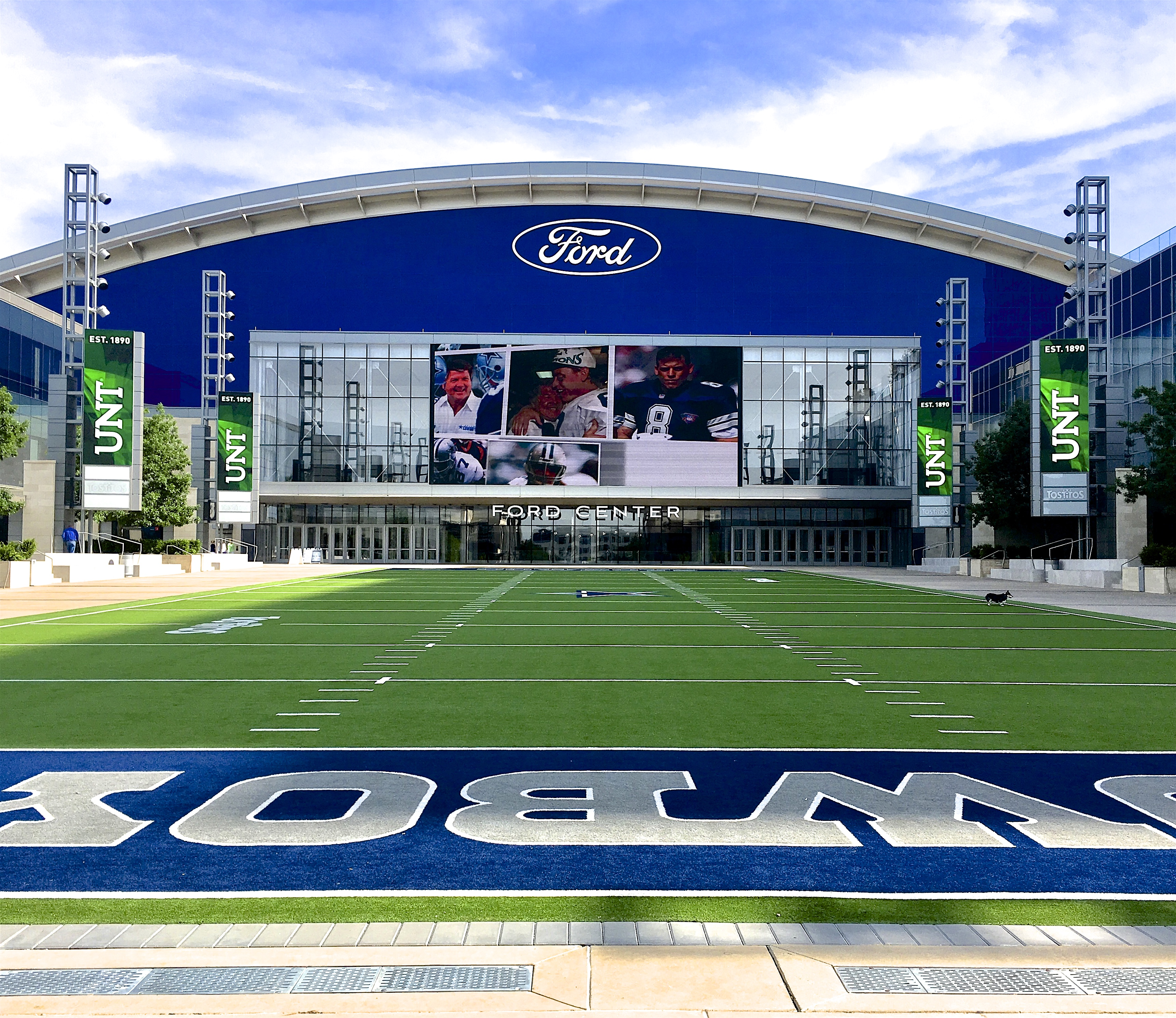
The Cowboys' corporate headquarters and practice facility are situated on a 91-acre campus named the Ford Center at the Star in Frisco, Texas

Dallas Cowboys training camp locations:

- 1960: Pacific University, Forest Grove, Oregon
- 1961: St. Olaf College, Northfield, Minnesota
- 1962: Northern Michigan College, Marquette, Michigan
- 1963–1989: California Lutheran College, Thousand Oaks, California
- 1990–1997: St. Edward's University, Austin, Texas
- 1998–2002: Midwestern State University, Wichita Falls, Texas
- 2001, 2004–2006, 2008, 2012–2015: River Ridge Sports Complex, Oxnard, California
- 2002–2003, 2007, 2009: The Alamodome, San Antonio, Texas
- 2010–2011: The Alamodome, San Antonio, Texas and River Ridge Sports Complex, Oxnard, California
- 2016–present: The Ford Center at The Star, Frisco, Texas

== Nationwide fanbase ==
=== Fan support ===
Ever since the team joined the NFL in 1960, the franchise have garnered strong fan support in both the Dallas–Fort Worth metroplex and the state of Texas. With its strong fanbase across the country, including the notable presence of fans at road games, the Cowboys are often referred to as "America's Team".

=== Criticism ===
Despite the historical success of the franchise and a large Cowboys' fanbase, many fans of other NFL teams have come to dislike the Cowboys. Over the years, the Cowboys' fanbase had been labeled as the most annoying in all of sports. ESPN host and commentator Stephen A. Smith has validated this claim.

== Rivalries ==
The NFC East, composed of the Cowboys, Philadelphia Eagles, the Washington Commanders and New York Giants, is one of the least-changed divisions of the original six formed in the wake of the NFL-AFL merger (its only major changes being the relocation of the Cardinals franchise from St. Louis to Arizona and its subsequent move to the NFC West in the league's 2002 realignment). Three of the four teams have been division rivals since the Cowboys' entry into the NFL. As such, the Cowboys have some of the longest and fiercest rivalries in the sport.

=== Divisional ===
==== Washington Commanders ====
The Washington Commanders and the Dallas Cowboys enjoy what has been called by Sports Illustrated the top NFL rivalry of all time and "one of the greatest in sports". Some sources trace the enmity to before the Cowboys were even formed, due to a longstanding disagreement between Washington owner George Preston Marshall and Cowboys founder Clint Murchison, Jr. over the creation of a new football team in the South, due to Marshall's TV monopoly in that region. The two teams' storied on-field rivalry goes back to 1960 when the two clubs first played each other, resulting in a 26–14 Washington victory. Since that time, the two teams have met in 126 regular-season contests and two NFC Championships. Dallas leads the regular season all-time series 78–46–2, and Washington leads the all-time playoff series 2–0. The Cowboys currently have a 14–7 advantage over Washington at FedEx Field. Some notable moments in the rivalry include Washington's victory over Dallas in the 1982 NFC Championship and the latter's 1989 win over Washington for their only victory that season. The last Cowboys game with Tom Landry as coach was a win over Washington on December 11, 1988. In the 2010s, Washington has struggled to consistently compete for the Division title, but still play the Cowboys particularly tough, posting an impressive upset victory against Dallas in 2014, despite being outclassed by the Cowboys in the overall standings. The 2010s also included an important game in week 17 of 2012 which saw Washington defeat Dallas 28–18 to win the NFC East.

==== Philadelphia Eagles ====
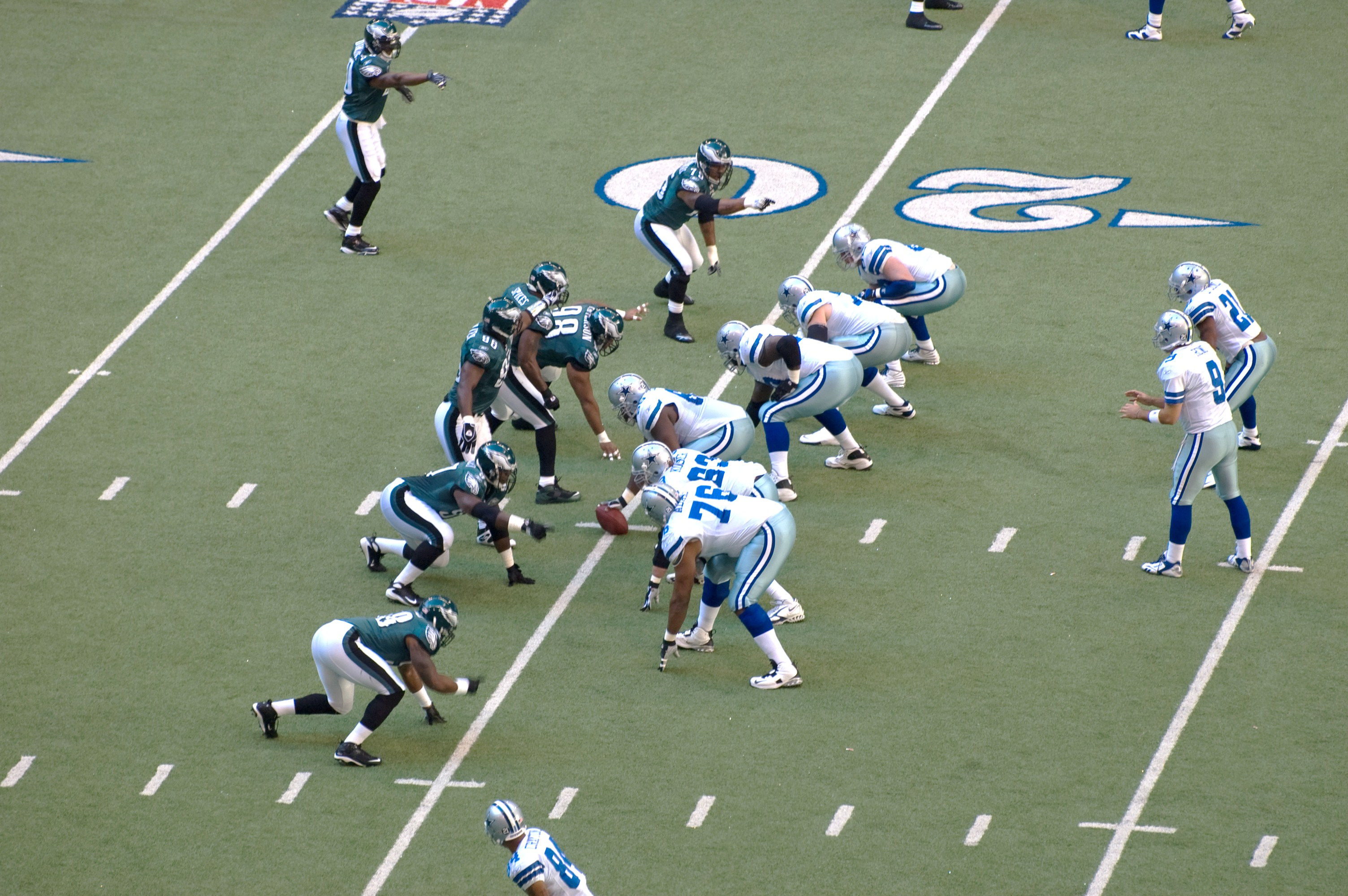
A game between the Cowboys and the Philadelphia Eagles in December 2007

The competition between the Cowboys and the Philadelphia Eagles has been particularly intense since the late 1970s, when the long-moribund Eagles returned to contention. In January 1981, the two teams faced off in the NFC Championship, with Philadelphia winning 20–7. A series of other factors heightened tensions during the 1980s and 1990s, including several provocative actions by Philadelphia fans and Eagles head coach Buddy Ryan. Among these were the 1989 Bounty Bowls in which Ryan allegedly placed a bounty on Dallas kicker Luis Zendejas and Veterans Stadium fans pelted the Cowboys with snowballs and other debris.

A 1999 game in Philadelphia saw Eagles fans cheering as Michael Irvin lay motionless on the field at Veterans Stadium. In 2008, the rivalry became more intense when in the last game of the year in which both teams could clinch a playoff spot with a victory, the Philadelphia Eagles defeated the Cowboys 44–6. The following season, the Cowboys avenged that defeat by beating the Eagles three times: twice during the regular season to claim the title as NFC East champions and once more in a wild-card playoff game by a combined score of 78–30, including a 24–0 shutout in week 17. That three-game sweep was Dallas' first over any opponent and the longest winning streak against the Eagles since 1992–1995 when Dallas won seven straight matches against Philadelphia.

During the 2013 season, Dallas won the first meeting 17–3 at Lincoln Financial Field in Philadelphia. The two teams met again in Week 17 at AT&T Stadium with the winner clinching the 2013 NFC East title. The Cowboys came into the game at a disadvantage with starting quarterback Tony Romo out with a season-ending back injury, which put backup Kyle Orton as the starter. It was a tight game with the Eagles up 24–22 with less than 2 minutes to go in regulation. Orton got the ball and started driving down the field when he was intercepted by the Eagles defense, which ended the game and the Cowboys season. In 2014, the Cowboys and Eagles both won against each other on the road with Philadelphia posting a dominant 33–10 win on Thanksgiving Day in Dallas, and Dallas returning the favor two weeks later by defeating the Eagles 38–27 at Lincoln Financial Field in Philadelphia. The second game between these rivals clinched a playoff spot for Dallas and led to formerly first-place Philadelphia missing out on the post-season. Dallas leads the all-time series 73–56.

==== New York Giants ====
The first game ever played between the New York Giants and Cowboys was a 31–31 tie on December 4, 1960. Dallas logged its first win in the series on October 29, 1961, and New York's first was on November 11, 1962. Among the more notable moments in the rivalry was the Giants' defeat of Dallas in the 2007 playoffs en route to their victory in Super Bowl XLII and winning the first regular-season game played at Cowboys Stadium in 2009. Dallas currently leads the all-time series 75–47–2.

=== Conference ===
==== San Francisco 49ers ====
The bitter rivalry between the Dallas Cowboys and San Francisco 49ers has been going on since the 1970s. The NFL Top 10 ranked this rivalry to be the tenth best in the history of the NFL. San Francisco has played Dallas in seven postseason games. The Cowboys defeated the 49ers in the 1970 and 1971 NFC Championship games, and again in the 1972 Divisional Playoff Game. The 1981 NFC Championship Game in San Francisco, which saw the 49ers' Joe Montana complete a game-winning pass to Dwight Clark in the final minute (now known as The Catch) is one of the most famous games in NFL history. The rivalry became even more intense during the 1992–1994 seasons. San Francisco and Dallas faced each other in the NFC Championship Game three separate times. Dallas won the first two match-ups, and San Francisco won the third. In each of these pivotal match-ups, the game's victor went on to win the Super Bowl. Both the Cowboys and the 49ers are tied for third all-time in Super Bowl victories to the Pittsburgh Steelers and New England Patriots, with five each. The 49ers-Cowboys rivalry is also part of the larger cultural rivalry between California and Texas. The 49ers lead the all-time series with a record of 20–19–1.

==== Green Bay Packers ====
The rivalry between the Dallas Cowboys and the Green Bay Packers is one of the best known intra-conference rivalries in the NFL. The two teams do not play every year; instead, they play once every three years due to the NFL's rotating division schedules, or if the two teams finish in the same place in their respective divisions, they would play the ensuing season. The rivalry has also resulted in notable playoff games.

The all-time regular seasons series record is 22–17–1 in favor of the Packers, and the postseason series is also in favor of the Packers at 5–4.

==== Los Angeles Rams ====
The Cowboys also had a fierce rivalry with the Los Angeles Rams, particularly during the 1970s and 1980s. The two teams played eight postseason games during this period, including two NFC championship games. Between 1975 and 1980, the Cowboys faced the Rams in the playoffs five times in a six-year period. In both 1975 and 1978, the Cowboys won the NFC championship on the road in blowout fashion, only to be followed by close defeats at home in next year's divisional round. The 1980 Wild Card Round saw Dallas follow up last year's playoff defeat with another blowout victory. As of 2022, the Cowboys and Rams tied the all-time regular season series 18–18, but the Rams lead the all-time playoff series 5–4, having recently defeated the Cowboys in the 2018 Divisional Round.

==== Minnesota Vikings ====
Between the Dallas Cowboys and Minnesota Vikings,. The teams have met seven times in the post-season, the Cowboys third most played playoff opponent. The rivalry is home to many key memories, including the famous 1975 Hail Mary pass against the Vikings, the Herschel Walker trade, the Randy Moss Thanksgiving game, and Brett Favre torching the Cowboys in what would be his last playoff win of his career in 2009. As of the 2025 season, the Cowboys lead the all-time series 19–16.

=== Interconference ===
==== Houston Oilers/Houston Texans ====
The Cowboys have an intrastate interconference rivalry with the Houston Texans for which they compete in either a preseason or regular season game for bragging rights in Texas, a tradition started between the teams prior to the Oilers relocating to Nashville, Tennessee to become the Tennessee Titans. The Texans defeated the Cowboys in the team's inaugural season in 2002. The Cowboys lead the all-time series 4–2.

==== Kansas City Chiefs ====
Due to the Cowboys driving his Dallas Texans out of the city, Chiefs owner Lamar Hunt held a grudge against the NFL franchise during the 1960s. In 2005, Jones compared Hunt to a wolf in sheep's clothing because of his interest in the Cowboys despite acting otherwise.

Still, Jones and Hunt were close friends and neighbors who lived by Preston Road. In 1998, Hunt created a trophy for their teams called the Preston Road Trophy that would be given to whoever won when they met. They often pranked each other when passing the trophy, while Jones quipped in 2025 that he would put it by the foot of his bed after reclaiming it from Kansas City.

CBS11 Sports wrote in 2017 that "it may not be Cowboys–Redskins, or Cowboys–Eagles, or Cowboys–Giants, but [the] Cowboys game against the Kansas City Chiefs is an old school rivalry."

==== Pittsburgh Steelers ====
The two teams met in the first regular-season game the Cowboys ever played in 1960 (a 35–28 loss to the Steelers), the first-ever regular-season victory for the expansion Cowboys in 1961, and would later meet in three Super Bowls, all of them closely contested events. The Steelers-Cowboys is to date the Super Bowl matchup with the most contests. The Steelers won Super Bowl X and Super Bowl XIII; both games were decided in the final seconds, first on a last-second throw by Roger Staubach, then as a fourth-quarter rally by Dallas fell short on an onside kick. The Cowboys won Super Bowl XXX in January 1996. It is said that the rivalry was fueled in the 1970s due to the stark contrast of the teams: the Cowboys, being more of a "flashy" team with Roger Staubach's aerial attack and the "flex" Doomsday Defense; while the Steelers were more of a "blue-collar" team with a strong running game and the 1970s-esque Steel Curtain defense, a contrast that still exists today. In addition, both teams have national fan bases rivaled by few NFL teams, and both come from areas with a strong following for football at all levels. Dallas leads the all-time series 17–16 including the playoffs.

== Players of note ==
=== Current roster ===
Dallas Cowboys roster
Quarterbacks (QB): 16 Sam Howell; 4 Dak Prescott; Running backs (RB): 30 Hunter Luepke FB; 33 Javonte Williams; Wide receivers (WR): 80 Camden Brown; 19 Ryan Flournoy; 88 CeeDee Lamb; 18 Jonathan Mingo; 3 George Pickens; 9 KaVontae Turpin RS; Tight ends (TE): 87 Jake Ferguson; 84 James Mitchell; 86 Luke Schoonmaker; 89 Brevyn Spann-Ford	Offensive linemen (OL): 66 T. J. Bass G; 56 Cooper Beebe C; 52 Tyler Booker G; 60 Tyler Guyton T; 77 Broderick Jones T; 51 Nick Leverett G; 67 Drew Shelton T; 73 Tyler Smith G; 78 Terence Steele T; Defensive linemen (DL): 90 Jonathan Bullard DT; 97 Kenny Clark DT; 93 Elijah Garcia DT; 91 Otito Ogbonnia DT; 99 LT Overton DT; 92 Quinnen Williams DT	Linebackers (LB): 55 Jaishawn Barham MLB; 45 Justin Barron MLB; 6 Donovan Ezeiruaku OLB; 7 Rashan Gary OLB; 41 James Houston OLB; 50 Shemar James MLB; 35 Marist Liufau OLB; 40 Von Miller OLB; 0 DeMarvion Overshown MLB; 53 Dee Winters MLB; Defensive backs (DB): 14 Markquese Bell S; 26 DaRon Bland CB; 11 Alijah Clark S; 13 Caleb Downs S; 2 Cobie Durant CB; 24 Malik Hooker S; 1 P. J. Locke S; 25 Joey Porter Jr. CB; 28 Shavon Revel CB; 23 Ameer Speed CB; 43 Juanyeh Thomas S; Special teams (ST): 5 Bryan Anger P; 17 Brandon Aubrey K; 44 Trent Sieg LS	Practice squad: 37 Israel Abanikanda RB; 36 Jashaun Corbin RB; 95 Tommy Dunn DT; 39 Tyrek Funderburk CB; 81 Jordan Hudson WR; 79 Marcellus Johnson T; 15 Derion Kendrick CB; 58 Isaiah Land OLB; 31 Kendre Miller RB; 64 Wanya Morris T; 96 Adedayo Odeleye DT (IPP); 42 Curtis Robinson LB; 83 Anthony Smith WR; 10 Kyle Trask QB; 46 Michael Trigg TE; Reserve: 20 Malik Davis RB (IR); 85 Princeton Fant TE (IR); 94 Kelvin Gilliam DT (IR); 32 Tyler Goodson RB (IR); 72 Matt Hennessy C (IR); 57 Malachi Lawrence OLB (IR); 29 Devin Moore CB (IR/DFR); 34 Jalen Thompson S (IR) 53 active, 14 practice squad (1 IPP), 8 reserve As of November 17, 2026. Rookies in italics.; Roster; Depth chart; Transactions

=== Pro Football Hall of Famers ===
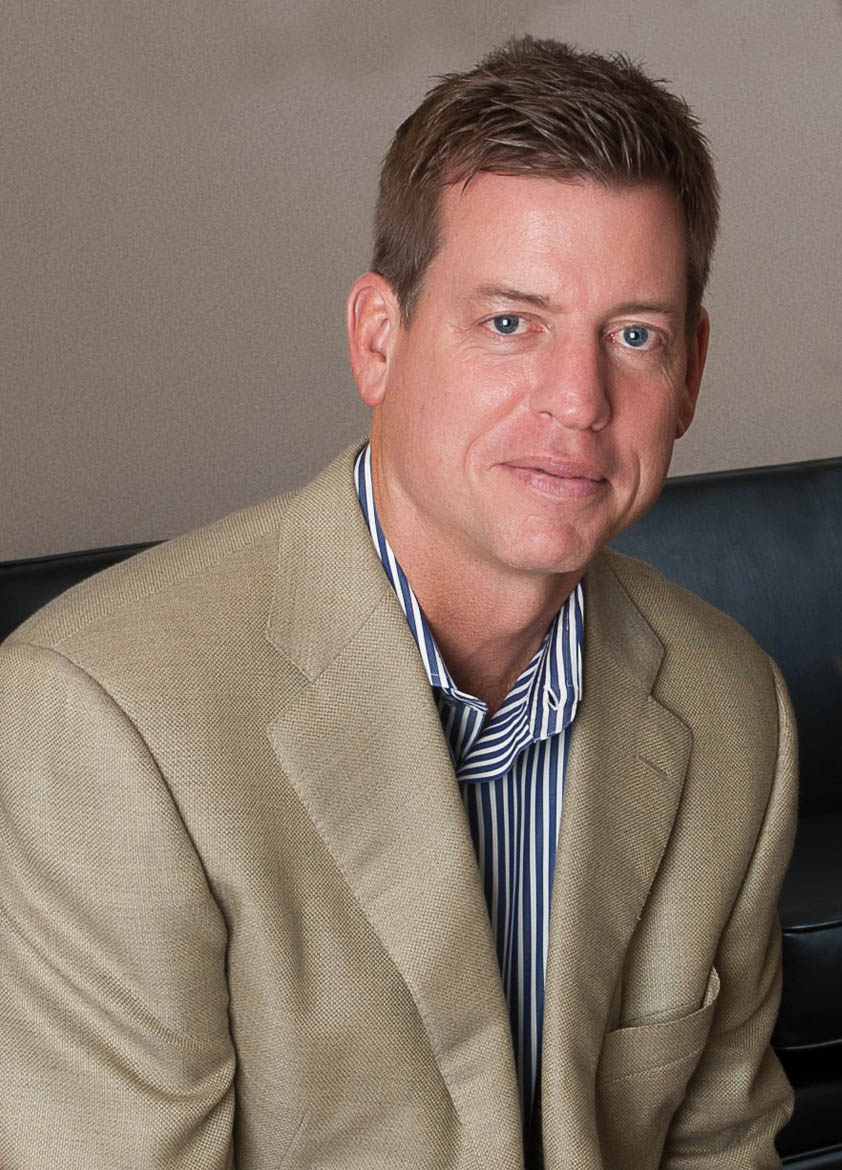
Hall of Fame QB Troy Aikman

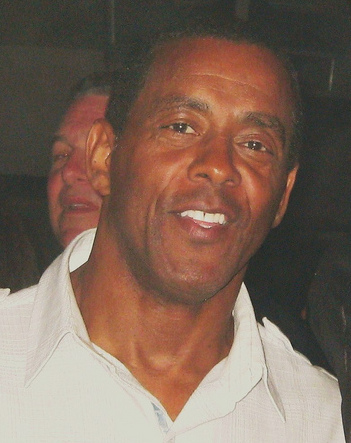
Hall of Fame RB Tony Dorsett

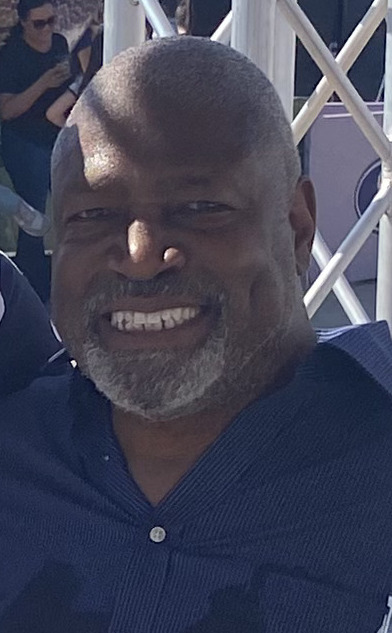
Hall of Fame DE Charles Haley

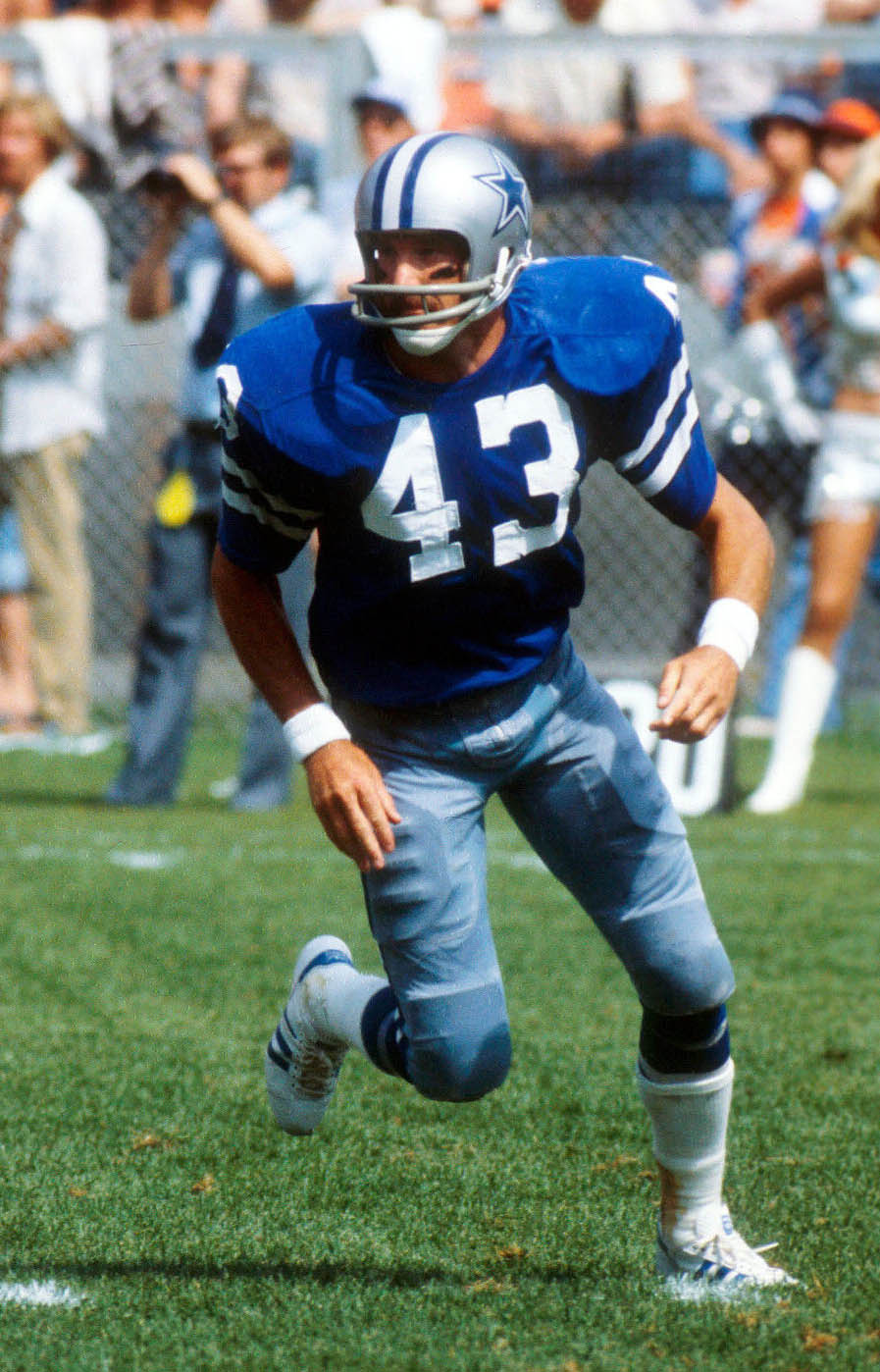
Hall of Fame S Cliff Harris

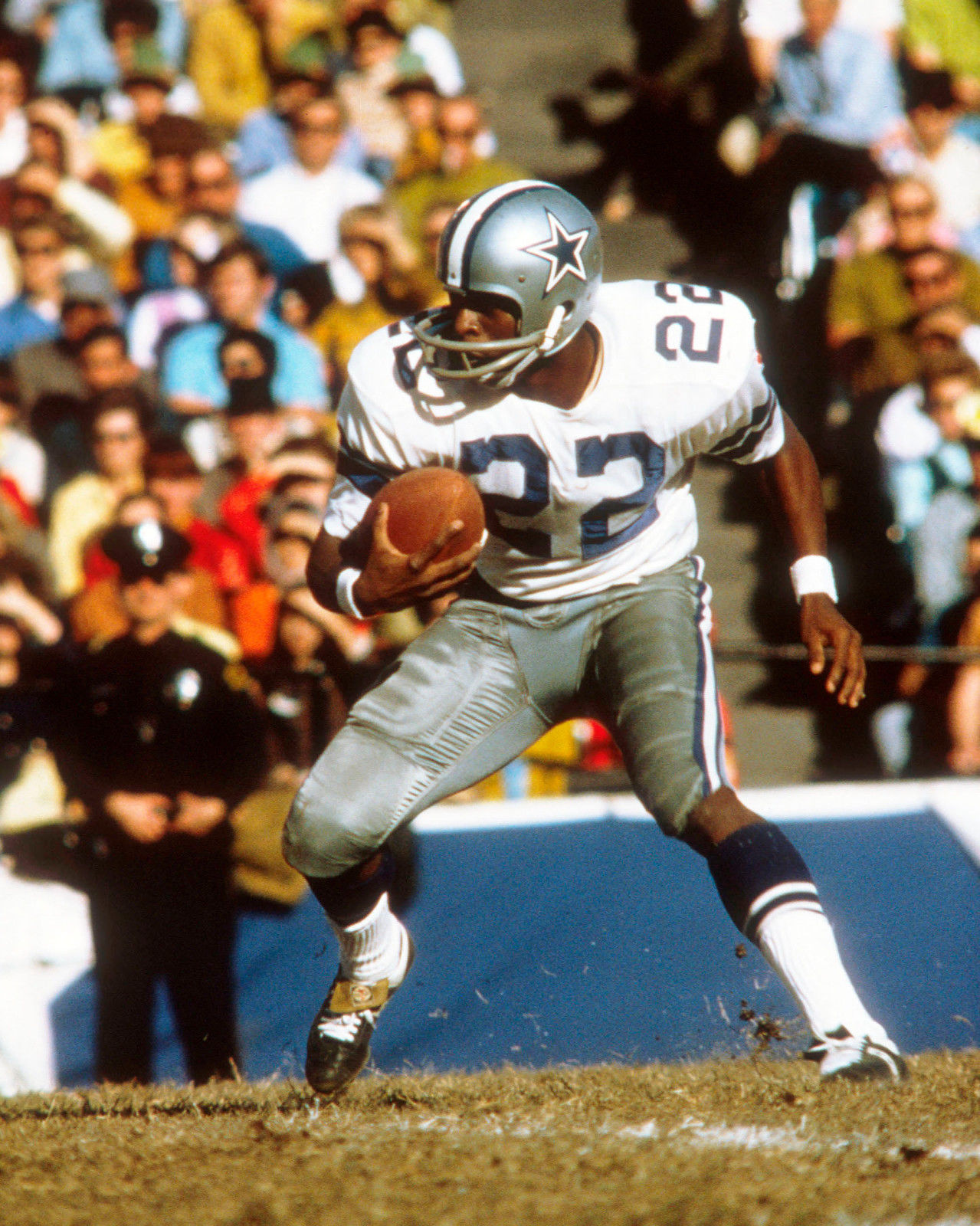
Hall of Fame WR Bob Hayes

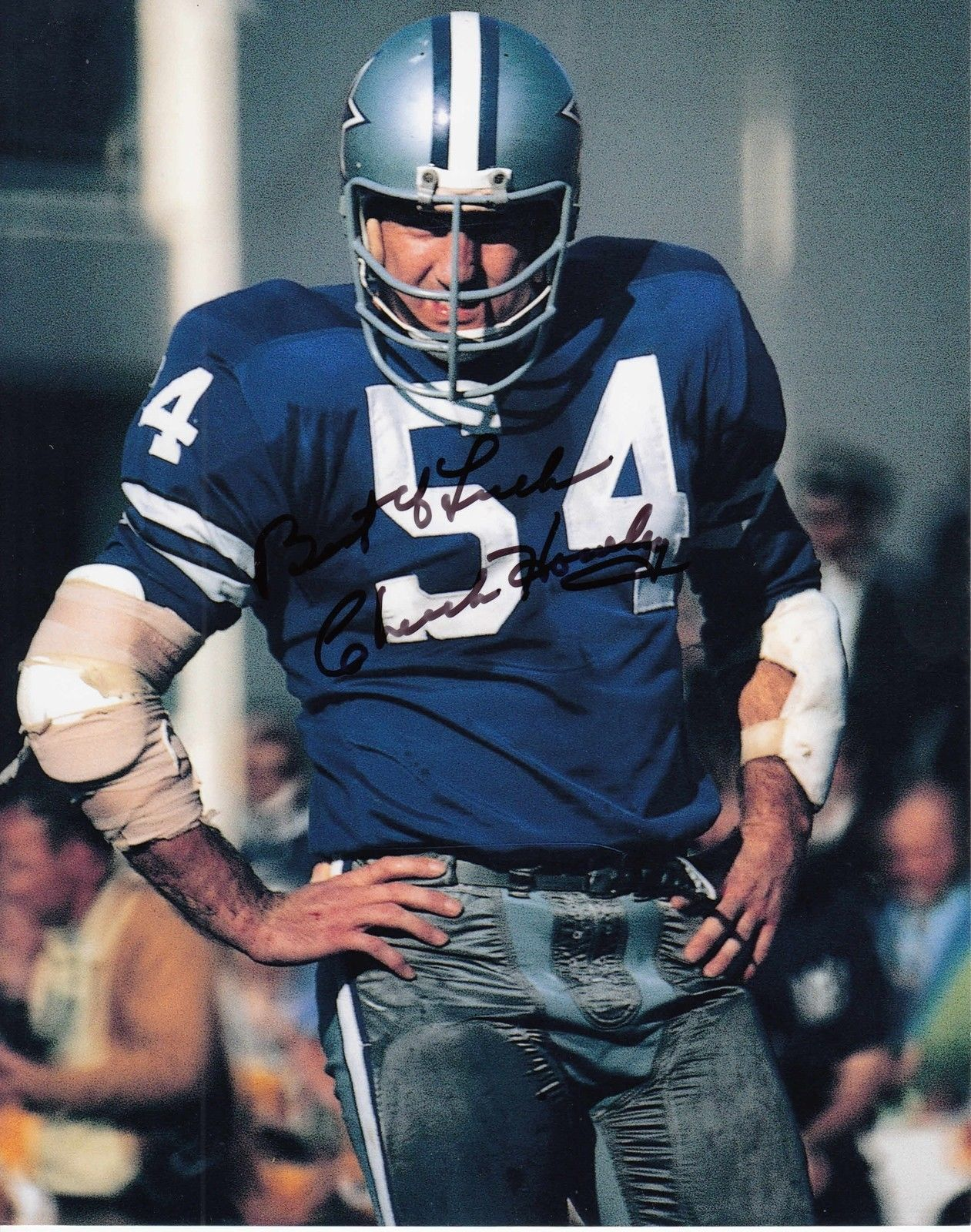
Hall of Fame LB Chuck Howley

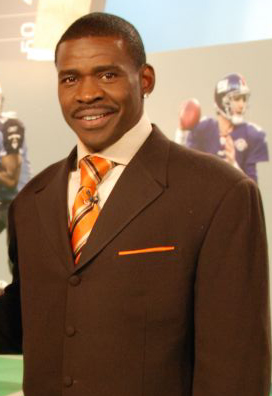
Hall of Fame WR Michael Irvin

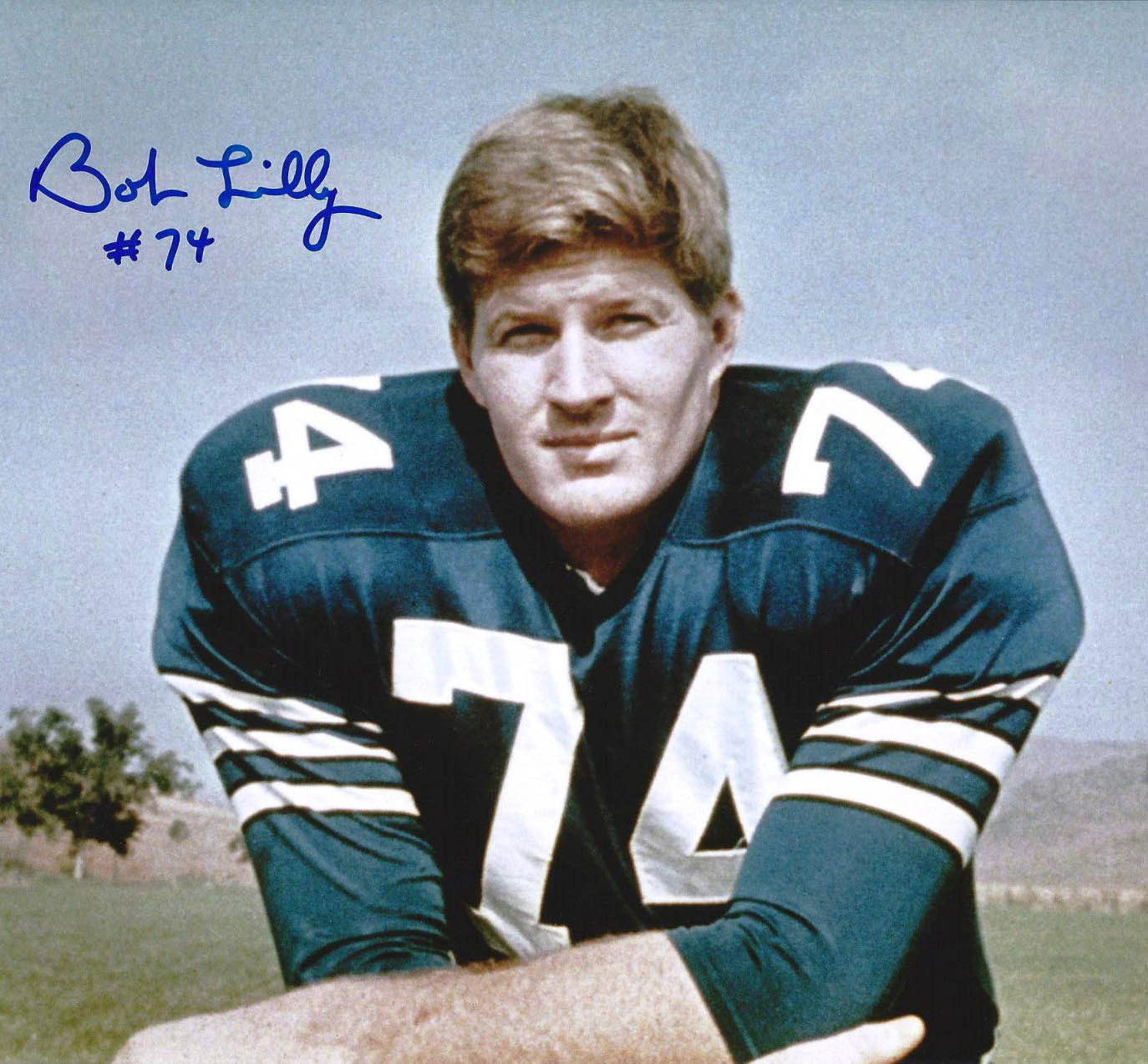
Hall of Fame DT Bob Lilly

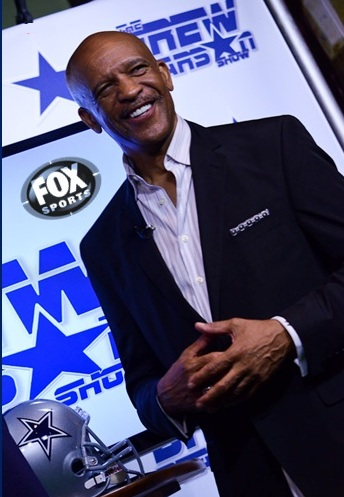
Hall of Fame WR Drew Pearson

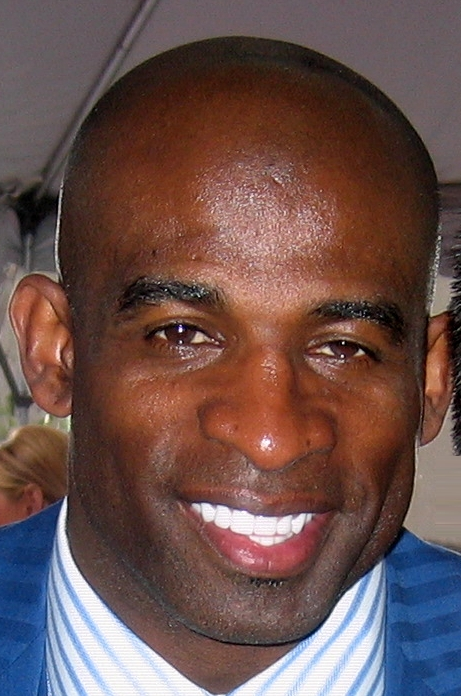
Hall of Fame CB Deion Sanders

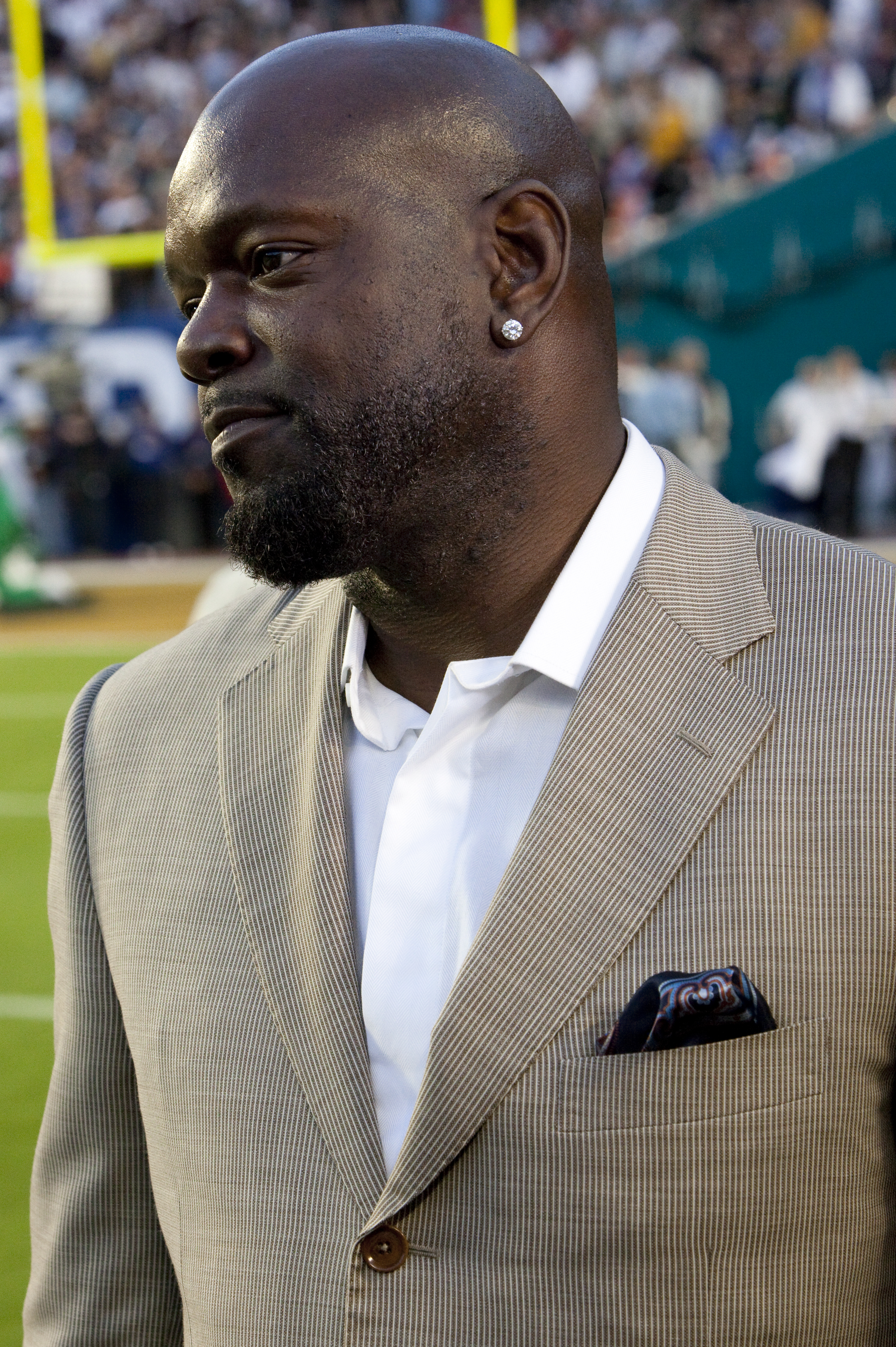
Hall of Fame RB Emmitt Smith

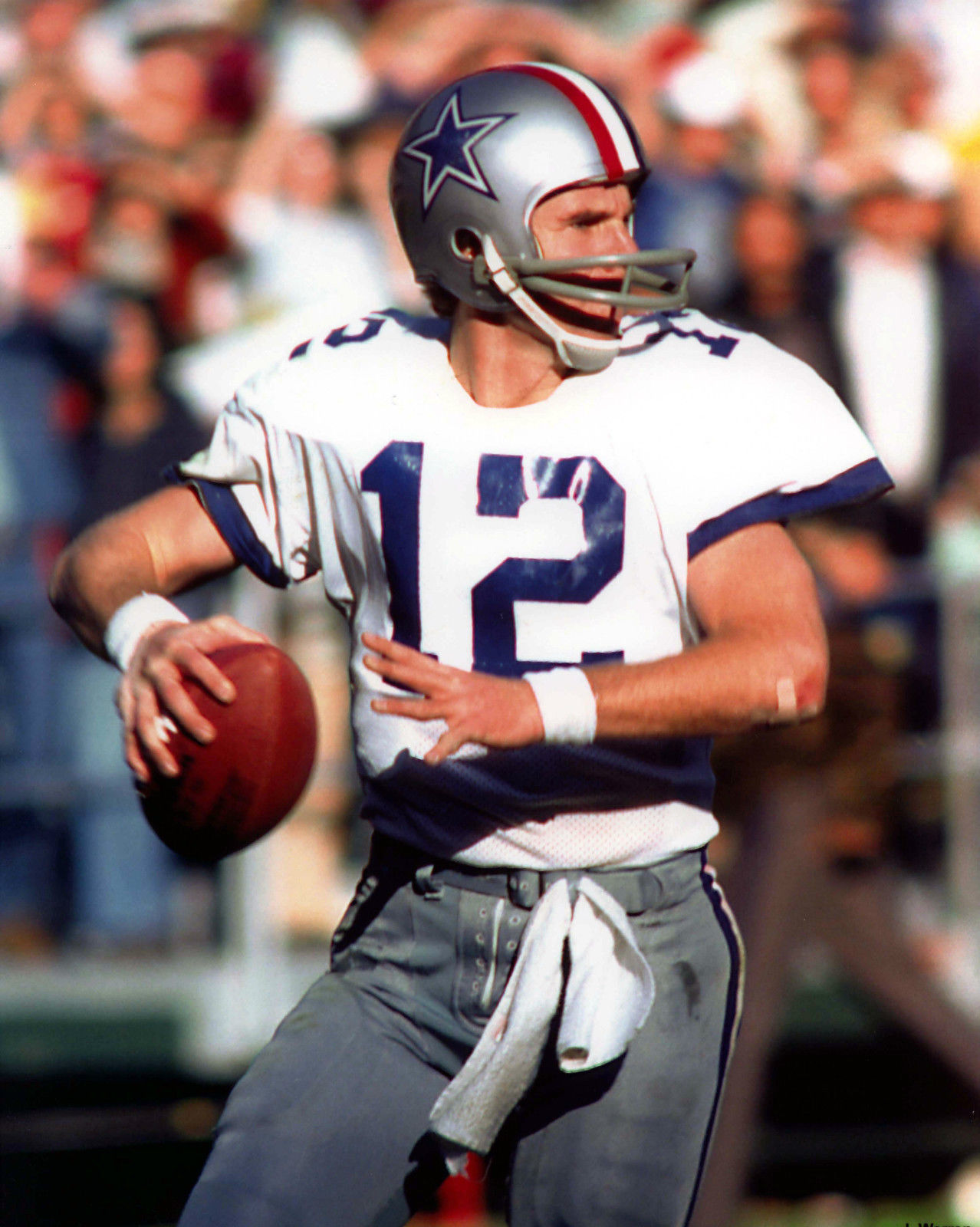
Hall of Fame QB Roger Staubach

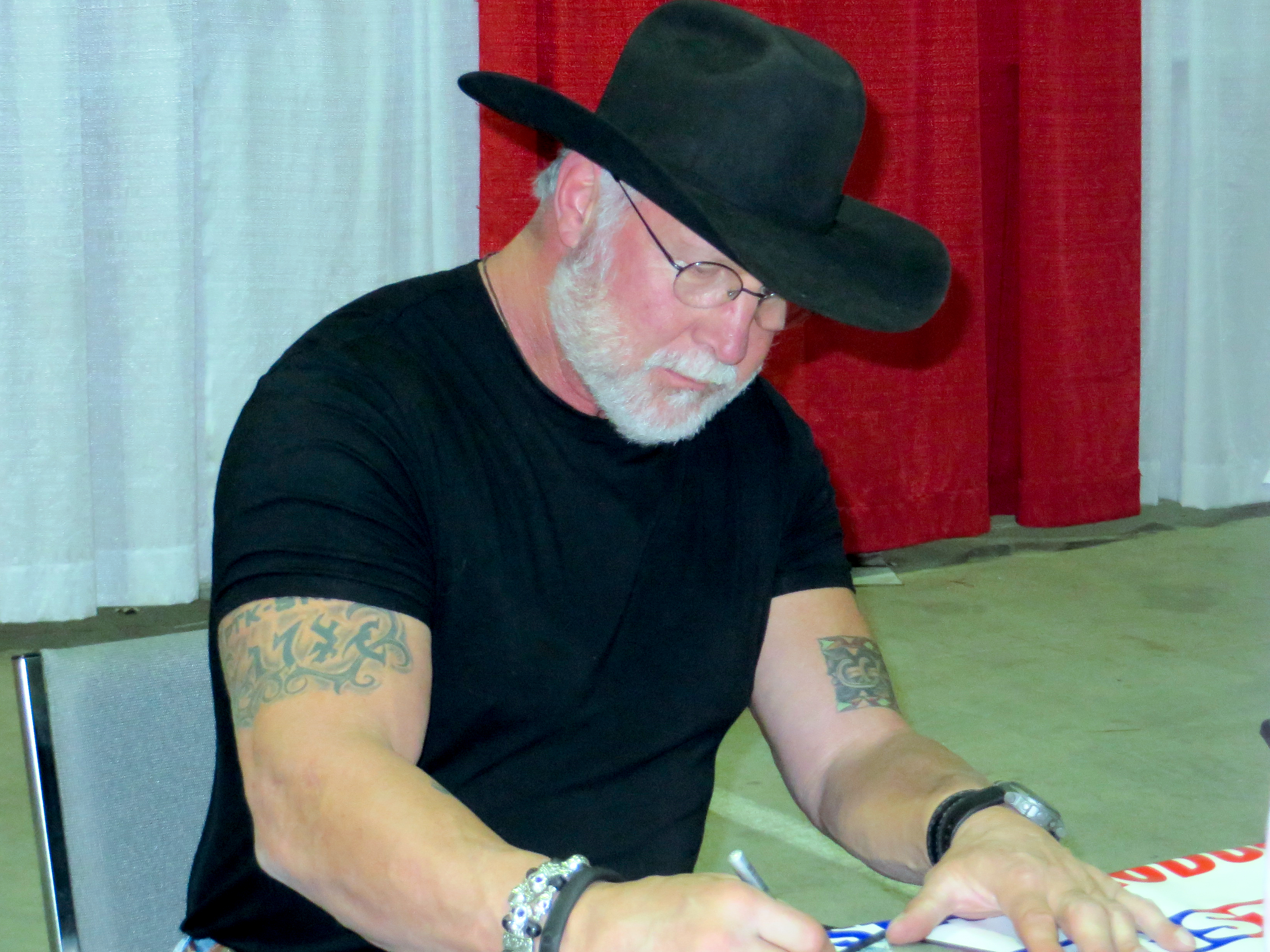
Hall of Fame DT Randy White

Dallas Cowboys Hall of Famers
Players
No.	Name	Position	Seasons	Inducted
79	Forrest Gregg	OT	1971	1977
19	Lance Alworth	WR	1971–1972	1978
74	Bob Lilly	DT	1961–1974	1980
26	Herb Adderley	CB	1970–1972	1981
12	Roger Staubach	QB	1969–1979	1985
89	Mike Ditka	TE	1969–1972	1988
33	Tony Dorsett	RB	1977–1987	1994
81	Jackie Smith	TE	1978	1994
54	Randy White	DT, LB	1975–1988	1994
20	Mel Renfro	CB	1964–1977	1996
25	Tommy McDonald	WR	1964	1998
8	Troy Aikman	QB	1989–2000	2006
70	Rayfield Wright	OT	1967–1979	2006
88	Michael Irvin	WR	1988–1999	2007
22	Bob Hayes	WR	1965–1974	2009
22	Emmitt Smith	RB	1990–2002	2010
21	Deion Sanders	CB, KR	1995–1999	2011
73	Larry Allen	G	1994–2005	2013
94	Charles Haley	DE	1992–1996	2015
81	Terrell Owens	WR	2006–2008	2018
17	Harold Carmichael	WR	1984	2020
43	Cliff Harris	S	1970–1979	2020
88	Drew Pearson	WR	1973–1983	2021
54	Chuck Howley	LB	1961–1973	2023
55	Zach Thomas	LB	2008	2023
94	DeMarcus Ware	LB	2005–2013	2023
Coaches and Contributors
Name		Position	Seasons	Inducted
Tom Landry		Coach	1960–1988	1990
Tex Schramm		President/GM	1960–1988	1991
Bill Parcells		Coach	2003–2006	2013
Jerry Jones		Owner/Executive	1989–present	2017
Gil Brandt		Executive	1960–1988	2019
Jimmy Johnson		Coach	1989–1993	2020

=== Super Bowl MVPs ===
The Cowboys have had seven players win Super Bowl MVP.

Super Bowl MVP Winners
Super Bowl	Player	Position
V	Chuck Howley	LB
VI	Roger Staubach	QB
XII	Randy White	DT
XII	Harvey Martin	DE
XXVII	Troy Aikman	QB
XXVIII	Emmitt Smith	RB
XXX	Larry Brown	CB

=== Ring of Honor ===
Unlike many NFL teams, the Cowboys do not retire jersey numbers of past standouts as a matter of policy. Instead, the team has a "Ring of Honor", which is on permanent display encircling the field. Originally at Texas Stadium, the ring is now on display at AT&T Stadium in Arlington. The first inductee was Bob Lilly in 1975 and by 2005, the ring contained 17 names, all former Dallas players except for one head coach and one general manager/president.

The Ring of Honor has been a source of controversy over the years. Tex Schramm was believed to be a "one-man committee" in choosing inductees and many former Cowboys players and fans felt that Schramm deliberately excluded linebacker Lee Roy Jordan because of a bitter contract dispute the two had during Jordan's playing days. When Jerry Jones bought the team he inherited Schramm's Ring of Honor "power" and immediately inducted Jordan.

Jones also has sparked controversy regarding his decisions in handling the "Ring of Honor". For four years he was unsuccessful in convincing Tom Landry to accept induction. Meanwhile, he refused to induct Tex Schramm (even after Schramm's induction to the Pro Football Hall of Fame). In 1993, thanks in part to the efforts of Roger Staubach as an intermediary, Landry accepted induction and had a ceremony on the day of that year's Cowboys-Giants game (Landry had played and coached for the Giants). In 2003, Jones chose to induct Tex Schramm. Schramm and Jones held a joint press conference at Texas Stadium announcing the induction. Schramm did not live to see his ceremonial induction at the Cowboys-Eagles game that fall.

Troy Aikman, all-time NFL leading rusher Emmitt Smith, and Michael Irvin, known as "The Triplets", were inducted into the Ring of Honor during halftime at a Monday Night Football home game against the archrival Washington Redskins on September 19, 2005.

Defensive end Charles Haley, offensive lineman Larry Allen, and wide receiver Drew Pearson were inducted into the Ring of Honor during halftime of the Cowboys' game vs. the Seattle Seahawks on November 6, 2011.

Safety Darren Woodson was inducted on November 1, 2015. Executive Gil Brandt was inducted on November 29, 2018.

The most recent inductees were DeMarcus Ware, who was inducted on October 29, 2023, and Jimmy Johnson, who was inducted on December 30, 2023.

Pro Football Hall of Fame finalist
Inducted or Enshrined in the Pro Football Hall of Fame

No.	Name	Position	Years With Club	Inducted
74	Bob Lilly	DT	1961–1974	November 23, 1975
17	Don Meredith	QB	1960–1968	November 7, 1976
43	Don Perkins	FB	1961–1968	November 7, 1976
54	Chuck Howley	LB	1961–1973	October 30, 1977
20	Mel Renfro	CB	1964–1977	October 25, 1981
12	Roger Staubach	QB	1969–1979	October 9, 1983
55	Lee Roy Jordan	LB, C	1963–1976	October 29, 1989
—	Tom Landry	Head coach	1960–1988	November 7, 1993
33	Tony Dorsett	RB	1977–1987	October 9, 1994
54	Randy White	DT, LB, DE	1975–1988	October 9, 1994
22	Bob Hayes	WR	1965–1974	September 23, 2001
—	Tex Schramm	General Manager	1960–1989	October 12, 2003
43	Cliff Harris	S	1970–1979	October 10, 2004
70	Rayfield Wright	OT	1967–1979	October 10, 2004
8	Troy Aikman	QB	1989–2000	September 19, 2005
88	Michael Irvin	WR	1988–1999	September 19, 2005
22	Emmitt Smith	RB	1990–2002	September 19, 2005
88	Drew Pearson	WR	1973–1983	November 6, 2011
94	Charles Haley	DE	1992–1996	November 6, 2011
73	Larry Allen	OG, OT	1994–2005	November 6, 2011
28	Darren Woodson	S	1992–2004	November 1, 2015
—	Gil Brandt	VP Player Personnel	1960–1988	November 29, 2018
94	DeMarcus Ware	LB	2005–2013	October 29, 2023
—	Jimmy Johnson	Head coach	1989–1993	December 30, 2023

=== Retired numbers ===
The Dallas Cowboys do not officially retire jersey numbers; however, some are kept "unofficially inactive". As of 2022, six numbers have been kept out of circulation: Troy Aikman's No. 8, Roger Staubach's No. 12, Bob Hayes' and Emmitt Smith's No. 22, Bob Lilly's No. 74, and Jason Witten's No. 82. The Cowboys are one of three NFL teams that do not officially retire numbers, with the other two being the Atlanta Falcons and Las Vegas Raiders.

=== Career leaders ===
- Passing yards: 35,989 Dak Prescott (2016–2025)
- Pass completions: 3,184 Dak Prescott (2016–2025)
- Passing touchdowns: 248 Tony Romo (2004–2016)
- Rushing yards: 17,162 Emmitt Smith (1990–2002)
- Rushing touchdowns: 153 Emmitt Smith (1990–2002)
- Receptions: 1,215 Jason Witten (2003–2017, 2019)
- Receiving yards: 12,977 Jason Witten (2003–2017, 2019)
- Receiving touchdowns: 73 Dez Bryant (2010–2017)
- Points scored: 986 Emmitt Smith (1990–2002)
- Field goals made: 186 Dan Bailey (2011–2017)
- Total punt yardage: 24,542 Mike Saxon (1985–1992)
- Punting average: 45.3 Mat McBriar (2003–2011)
- Kickoff return yards: 3,518 KaVontae Turpin (2022–2025)
- Punt Return yards: 1,803 Kelvin Martin (1987–1992, 1996)
- Pass interceptions: 52 Mel Renfro (1964–1977)
- Sacks: 117.0 DeMarcus Ware (2005–2013)
- Forced fumbles: 32 DeMarcus Ware (2005–2013)

=== Single-season leaders ===
- Passing yards: 4,903 Tony Romo (2012)
- Passing touchdowns: 37 Dak Prescott (2021)
- Rushing yards: 1,845 DeMarco Murray (2014)
- Rushing touchdowns: 25 Emmitt Smith (1995)
- Receptions: 135 CeeDee Lamb (2023)
- Receiving yards: 1,749 CeeDee Lamb (2023)
- Receiving touchdowns: 16 Dez Bryant (2014)
- Points: 150 Emmitt Smith (1995)
- Field goals made: 34 Richie Cunningham (1997)
- Total punt yardage: 3,665 Toby Gowin (2003)
- Punting average: 49.0 Mat McBriar (2008)
- Kickoff return yards: 1,399 Tyson Thompson (2005)
- Punt return yards: 548 James Jones, Jr. (1980)
- Pass interceptions: 11 Everson Walls (1981) & Trevon Diggs (2021)
- Sacks: 20.0 DeMarcus Ware (2008)

=== All-time first-round draft picks ===
The Cowboys have had the number one overall pick in the NFL Draft on three occasions.

== Head coaches and staff ==
=== Current staff ===
Dallas Cowboys staff
Front office: Owner/president/general manager – Jerry Jones; COO/executive vice president/director of player personnel – Stephen Jones; Executive vice president/chief brand officer – Charlotte Jones Anderson; Executive vice president/chief of sales – Jerry Jones Jr.; Vice president of player personnel – Will McClay; Vice president of football operations/football administration – Todd Williams; Senior director of football administration and technology – Jason McKay; Director of college scouting – Mitch LaPoint; Assistant director of college scouting – Chris Vaughn; Director of pro scouting – Alex Loomis; Director of advance scouting – Keith O'Quinn; Vice president of football strategy and operations – John Park; Senior director of salary cap/player contracts – Adam Prasifka; Director of player development – Bryan Wansley; Head coach: Head coach – Brian Schottenheimer; Offensive coaches: Offensive coordinator – Klayton Adams; Quarterbacks – Steve Shimko; Running backs – Derrick Foster; Assistant running backs – Jamel Mutunga; Wide receivers – Junior Adams; Assistant wide receivers – Stephen Bravo-Brown; Tight ends – Lunda Wells; Offensive line – Conor Riley; Assistant offensive line/quality control – Kyle Fuller; Pass game specialist – Ken Dorsey	Defensive coaches: Defensive coordinator – Christian Parker; Senior defensive assistant – Mike Pettine; Defensive line – Marcus Dixon; Assistant defensive line – Demeitre Brim; Outside linebackers – Chidera Uzo-Diribe; Inside linebackers – Scott Symons; Assistant linebackers – J.J. Clark; Defensive backs/pass game coordinator – Derrick Ansley; Secondary – Ryan Smith; Assistant secondary – Robert Muschamp; Pass rush consultant – Brandon Jordan; Special teams coaches: Special teams coordinator – Nick Sorensen; Assistant special teams – Carlos Polk; Coaching operations/support staff: Chief of staff – Tyler Boyles; Game management coordinator – Ryan Feder; Strength and conditioning: Strength and conditioning – Harold Nash; Assistant strength and conditioning – Cedric Smith; Assistant strength and conditioning – Kendall Smith; Assistant strength and conditioning/sport science – Braylon Tatum; → Coaching staff → Front office → More NFL staffs

== Radio and television ==
As of 2010, the Cowboys' flagship radio station is KRLD-FM. Brad Sham is the team's longtime play-by-play voice. Working alongside him is former Cowboy quarterback Babe Laufenberg, who returned in 2007 after a one-year absence to replace former safety Charlie Waters. The Cowboys, who retain rights to all announcers, chose not to renew Laufenberg's contract in 2006 and brought in Waters. However, Laufenberg did work as the analyst on the "Blue Star Network", which televises Cowboys preseason games not shown on national networks. The anchor station is KTVT, the CBS owned and operated station in Dallas. Previous stations which aired Cowboys games included KVIL-FM, KRLD, and KLUV-FM. Kristi Scales is the sideline reporter on the radio broadcasts.

During his tenure as Cowboys coach, Tom Landry co-hosted his own coach's show with late veteran sportscaster Frank Glieber and later with Brad Sham. Landry's show was famous for his analysis of raw game footage and for him and his co-host making their NFL "predictions" at the end of each show. Glieber is one of the original voices of the Cowboys Radio Network, along with Bill Mercer, famous for calling the Ice Bowl of 1967 and both Super Bowl V and VI. Mercer is perhaps best known as the ringside commentator of WCCW in the 1980s. Upon Mercer's departure, Verne Lundquist joined the network, and became their play-by-play announcer by 1977, serving eight years in that capacity before handing those chores permanently over to Brad Sham, who joined the network in 1977 as the color analyst and occasional fill-in for Lundquist.

Longtime WFAA-TV sports anchor Dale Hansen was the Cowboys color analyst with Brad Sham as the play-by-play announcer from 1985 to 1996.

Dave Garrett served as the Cowboys' play-by-play announcer from 1995 to 1997, when Brad Sham left the team and joined the Texas Rangers' radio network team as well as broadcast Sunday Night Football on Westwood One.

Seeking to expand its radio broadcasting scope nationally, the Cowboys began a five-year partnership with Compass Media Networks on February 2, 2011. The result was the America's Team Radio Network, a supplement to the franchise's regional one. Beginning with the 2011 season, Kevin Burkhardt and Danny White handled the broadcasts, with Jerry Recco as the studio host.

== Fight song ==
The Dallas Cowboys fight song, "Cowboys Stampede March" by Tom Merriman Big Band was the official fight song of the Dallas Cowboys. The Cowboys now play We Dem Boyz by Wiz Khalifa for starting defensive line, because of the saying "How Bout Dem Cowboys". For every touchdown scored by the Cowboys at a home game the song "Cowboys and Cut Cigars" by The Burning of Rome is played after a train horn.

== See also ==
- America's Team – Nickname for the Dallas Cowboys
- Dallas Cowboys Cheerleaders – NFL cheerleader squad for the Dallas Cowboys
- Doomsday Defense – Defense of Dallas Cowboys American football team
- List of Dallas Cowboys players
- List of Dallas Cowboys seasons

Preceded by Baltimore Colts	Super Bowl champions 1971 (VI)	Succeeded by Miami Dolphins
Preceded by Oakland Raiders	Super Bowl champions 1977 (XII)	Succeeded by Pittsburgh Steelers
Preceded by Washington Redskins	Super Bowl champions 1992 (XXVII), 1993 (XXVIII)	Succeeded by San Francisco 49ers
Preceded by San Francisco 49ers	Super Bowl champions 1995 (XXX)	Succeeded by Green Bay Packers
