= History of the Dallas Cowboys =

This article contains an in-depth explanation of the history of the Dallas Cowboys, a American professional football team that competes in the National Football League (NFL).

== 1960s ==
=== Origins ===
The first NFL team in Texas were the Dallas Texans, which was a short-lived franchise that played a single season in 1952. The team relocated to New York City, after the previous New York Yanks organization suffered finanical problems and Giles and Colin Miller purchased the team to move to Dallas ahead of the 1952 season. The Dallas Cowboys were the NFL's first modern-era expansion team. The NFL was late in awarding Dallas; after Lamar Hunt was rebuffed in his efforts to acquire an NFL franchise for Dallas, he became part of a group of owners that formed the American Football League with Hunt's AFL franchise in Dallas known as the Texans (later to become the Kansas City Chiefs). In an effort not to cede the South to the AFL, the NFL awarded Dallas a franchise, but not until after the 1960 college draft had been held. As a result, the NFL's first ever expansion team played its inaugural season without the benefit of a college draft.

Originally, the formation of an NFL expansion team in Texas was met with strong opposition by Washington Redskins owner George Preston Marshall. Despite being located in the nation's capital, Marshall's Redskins had enjoyed a monopoly as the only NFL team to represent the American South for over 20 years since moving from Boston in 1937. Marshall was not about to give up the Redskins' status as the "professional football team of Dixie" without a fight. His intransigence came as little surprise to Dallas' would-be owners, Clint Murchison Jr. and Bedford Wynne. To ensure the birth of their expansion team, the men bought the rights to the Redskins fight song, "Hail to the Redskins", and threatened to refuse to allow Washington to play the song at games. Needing the song, Marshall changed his mind, and the city of Dallas was granted an NFL franchise on January 28, 1960. This early confrontation between the two franchises helped to trigger what became one of the more heated National Football League rivalries, which continues to this day.

The team was first known as the Dallas Steers, then the Dallas Rangers. On March 19, 1960, the organization announced that the team name was the Cowboys to avoid confusion with the American Association Dallas Rangers baseball team. The founding investors of the Dallas Cowboys were Clint Murchison, Jr. (45%), John D. Murchison (45%), along with minority shareholders, Toddie Lee and Bedford Wynne (Director and Secretary) (5%) and William R. Hawn (5%). The new owners subsequently hired CBS Sports executive and former Los Angeles Rams general manager Tex Schramm as president and general manager, San Francisco 49ers scout Gil Brandt as player personnel director, and New York Giants defensive coordinator Tom Landry as head coach.

=== 1960–1964: Early struggles ===
==== 1960: Winless first year ====
The Cowboys began play in 1960, and played their home games a few miles east of Downtown Dallas at the Cotton Bowl. For their first three seasons, they shared this stadium with the Dallas Texans (now the Kansas City Chiefs franchise), who began play in the American Football League that same year. The 1960 Cowboys finished their inaugural campaign 0-11-1 with a roster largely made up of sub-par players (many well past their prime).

==== 1961–1964: Gradual improvement ====
The following year, the Cowboys made their first college draft selection, taking TCU Horned Frogs defensive tackle Bob Lilly with the 13th pick in the draft (although the Cowboys finished with the league's worst record in 1960, the first overall selection in the 1961 draft was given to the expansion team Minnesota Vikings). The 1961 season also saw the Cowboys pick up their first victory in franchise history, a win over the Pittsburgh Steelers in the first game of the season. The Cowboys had played the Steelers in their first ever regular season game only the year before. The Cowboys finished their second campaign with an overall 4–9–1 record.

In 1962, Dallas improved slightly, going 5–8–1.

After the season, the Cowboys became the sole professional football franchise in the Dallas-Fort Worth area, as the AFL's Dallas Texans, despite winning the 1962 AFL championship by a score of 20–17 in double overtime, moved to Kansas City and became the Kansas City Chiefs. The Chiefs eventually joined the NFL as part of the 1970 AFL–NFL merger.

In 1963, Dallas fell back to 4–10. In 1964, they posted another 5-8-1 campaign. During this period, the Cowboys had the misfortune of being associated as the city where President Kennedy was assassinated. The Cowboys' success later in the decade largely contributed to restoring civic pride in Dallas after the assassination.

During the early and mid-1960s, the Cowboys gradually built a contender. Quarterback Don Meredith was acquired in 1960, running back Don Perkins, linebacker Chuck Howley and Lilly were acquired in 1961, linebacker Lee Roy Jordan in 1963, cornerback Mel Renfro in 1964, and wide receiver Bob Hayes and running back Dan Reeves in 1965.

=== 1965–1969: First tastes of success and "Next Year's Champions" ===
Murchison was willing to be patient with the Cowboys despite their struggles. He believed in allowing experts to execute those portions of the business within their area of expertise. This led him to give Schramm, Brandt, and Landry wide autonomy in football matters. He also delegated much of his authority over the business side of the operation to Schramm, who represented the Cowboys at league meetings and exercised the team's voting rights.

This approach paid off in 1965, when the Cowboys went 7–7, achieving a .500 record for the first time. The seven wins were almost half as many as they had tallied in their first five seasons combined.

In 1966, the Cowboys posted their first winning season, finishing atop the Eastern Conference with a 10–3–1 record. Dallas sent eight players to the Pro Bowl, including Howley, Meredith, Perkins, and future Pro Football Hall of Fame members Hayes, Lilly, and Renfro. In their first-ever postseason appearance, the Cowboys faced the Green Bay Packers in the 1966 NFL Championship Game, with a trip to the first ever Super Bowl on the line. Green Bay defeated Dallas 34–27 by stopping the Cowboys on a goal line stand with 28 seconds remaining and went on to win Super Bowl I 35–10 against the Kansas City Chiefs.

Despite this loss, 1966 marked the start of an NFL-record-setting eight consecutive postseason appearances for the Cowboys. (Dallas later broke its own record with nine consecutive trips to the playoffs between 1975 and 1983, a record that was tied by the Indianapolis Colts when they reached the playoffs every year from 2002 to 2010, and broken by the 2009-2019 New England Patriots.) It was also the beginning of a still NFL record streak of 20 consecutive winning seasons that extended through 1985. That same year, the Cowboys adopted the practice of hosting Thanksgiving games. It is widely rumored that the Cowboys sought a guarantee that they would regularly host Thanksgiving games as a condition of their very first one (since games on days other than Sunday were uncommon at the time and thus high attendance was not a certainty). This is only partly true; Dallas had in fact decided to host games on Thanksgiving by their own decision because there was nothing else to do or watch on that day. With exception of 1975 and 1977, the Cowboys have hosted a game every Thanksgiving Day since.

In 1967, the Cowboys finished with a 9–5 record and had their first playoff victory, a 52–14 rout of the Cleveland Browns. They went on to face the Packers in the 1967 NFL Championship game, a rematch of the 1966 NFL championship game, with the winner advancing to Super Bowl II. The game, which happened on December 31, 1967, at Lambeau Field in Green Bay, turned out to be the coldest NFL game in history (about -13° F with a -40° wind chill). The Cowboys lost 21–17 on a one-yard quarterback sneak by Packers quarterback Bart Starr with 16 seconds remaining. The game later became known as the "Ice Bowl." Green Bay went on to win the Super Bowl again, this time against the Oakland Raiders.

Dallas remained one of the NFL's top teams for the remainder of the 1960s, easily winning their division in 1968 (with a 12–2 record) and in 1969 (with an 11–2–1 mark). Each season, however, ended with a decisive loss to the Cleveland Browns. The Browns in turn lost in the NFL championship game to the Baltimore Colts and Minnesota Vikings in the 1968 and 1969 seasons respectively. The 1968 Colts and 1969 Vikings subsequently lost Super Bowl III and Super Bowl IV to the New York Jets and Kansas City Chiefs, respectively. Repeated failures to achieve their ultimate goal earned the Cowboys the nickname "Next Year's Champions" and a reputation for not being able to "win the big one." Peter Gent, a wide receiver with Dallas from 1964 to 1968, later wrote a book called North Dallas Forty based on his observations and experiences with the team. This book was made into a movie of the same name in 1979. The book and movie depicted many of the team's players as carousing, drug-abusing partiers callously used by the team and then tossed aside when they became too injured to continue playing productively.

In 1969, ground was broken on a new stadium for the Cowboys to replace the Cotton Bowl. Texas Stadium in Irving, a Dallas suburb, was completed during the 1971 season.

At the end of the decade, the historians Robert A. Calvert, Donald E. Chipman, and Randolph Campbell wrote The Dallas Cowboys and the NFL, an inside study of the organization and financing of the team. A reviewer describes the Cowboys as a vital cog of "an industry that occupies an important segment of American time and attention . . . a sophisticated industry that has worked out complex statistics to select the best thrower of a forward pass. . . . [and] has reformed television habits . . . "

== 1970s ==
In the 1970s, the NFL underwent many changes as it absorbed the AFL and became a unified league, and the Cowboys underwent many changes as well. Meredith and Perkins retired in 1969 and new players were joining the organization, like Cliff Harris and Duane Thomas and Pro Football Hall of Famers Rayfield Wright, Mike Ditka, Herb Adderley and Roger Staubach.

=== 1970: First Super Bowl appearance ===
Led by quarterback Craig Morton, the Cowboys had a 10–4 season in 1970. A 38–0 shutout by the Cardinals was the low point of the year, but the team recovered to make it to the playoffs. They defeated Detroit 5–0 in the lowest-scoring playoff game in NFL history and then defeated San Francisco 17–10 in the first-ever NFC Championship Game to qualify for their first Super Bowl appearance in franchise history, a mistake-filled Super Bowl V, where they lost 16–13 to the Baltimore Colts courtesy of a field goal by Colts' kicker Jim O'Brien with five seconds remaining in the contest. Despite the loss, linebacker Chuck Howley was named the Super Bowl MVP, the first and only time in Super Bowl history that the game's MVP did not come from the winning team.

=== 1971: First Super Bowl victory and the move to Texas Stadium ===
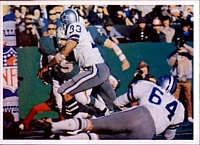
The Cowboys playing the Dolphins in their first Super Bowl championship.

The Cowboys moved from the Cotton Bowl to Texas Stadium in week six of the 1971 season. Although the first game in their new home was a 44–21 victory over New England, Dallas stumbled out of the gate by going 4–3 in the first half of the season, including losses to the mediocre New Orleans Saints and Chicago Bears. Landry named Staubach as the permanent starting quarterback to start the second half of the season, and Dallas was off and running. The Cowboys won their last seven regular season games (finishing 11–3) before dispatching of the Minnesota Vikings and San Francisco 49ers in the playoffs to return to the Super Bowl. In Super Bowl VI, behind an MVP performance from Staubach and a then Super Bowl record 252 yards rushing, the Cowboys crushed the upstart Miami Dolphins, 24–3, to finally bury the "Next Year's Champions" stigma. The Cowboys rushed for 252 yards, while holding the Dolphins, who went 17–0 in 1972, to 185 total yards.

=== 1972 ===
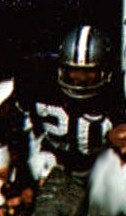
Mel Renfro, part of Dallas' famed "Doomsday Defense", pictured in action during Super Bowl V

The 1972 season was another winning one for the Cowboys, but their 10–4 record was only good for them to make the playoffs as a wild-card team. In the divisional playoffs they faced the San Francisco 49ers. The 49ers had a 28–13 lead and seemed to have avenged their playoff losses to Dallas in the two previous seasons. But after Landry benched Morton, Staubach threw two touchdown passes with less than two minutes remaining—including the game-winner to Ron Sellers—for a 30-28 Dallas win, the first of several dramatic comebacks led by Staubach during the 1970s. However, they were defeated by their archrival Washington Redskins 26–3 in the NFC Championship Game.

The Cowboys were now beginning to grow in popularity not just in Dallas, but nationwide. Their televised appearances on Thanksgiving Day games beginning in 1966 helped bring the Cowboys to a nationwide audience. Under Coach Landry, the so-called "Doomsday Defense" became a dominating force in the NFL. Dallas had also established several off-the-field innovations. The team was the first to use computers in scouting, the first to have a modern cheerleading squad performing sophisticated choreographed routines, and the first to broadcast games in Spanish. General manager Schramm became the most powerful GM in the NFL; it was he who pushed the league to adopt changes such as relocating the goal posts to the back of the end zone and (after the 1974 season) the use of instant replay. While Pittsburgh won more Super Bowls in the 1970s, Dallas emerged as the "glamour" team of the decade. The 1979 film North Dallas Forty, based on a book written by former Cowboys wide receiver Peter Gent, presented a veiled portrayal of the team's on-and-off field culture during this time.

=== 1974: 8–6, Playoffs missed ===
The Cowboys faltered slightly in 1974, finishing 8–6 and missing the playoffs for the first time in nine years. Bob Lilly retired following the season, capping his 14-year Hall of Fame career.

=== 1975: Third Super Bowl appearance ===
After missing the playoffs in 1974, the team drafted well the following year, adding defensive lineman Randy White (a future Hall of Fame member) and linebacker Thomas "Hollywood" Henderson. The influx of talent helped the Cowboys back to the playoffs in 1975 as a wild card, where they beat the Minnesota Vikings and Los Angeles Rams to advance to Super Bowl X, where they lost to the Pittsburgh Steelers, 21–17.

=== 1976 ===
In 1976, the team went 11–3, winning the NFC East. However, they were quickly eliminated from the playoffs with a 14–12 loss to the Rams.

For perhaps a season or two, some of the pro football teams played off season basketball. 1976 was one of those years. This page is the only mention of it on the Internet as of this notation.

The Dallas Cowboys beat The Pittsburgh Steelers 77 - 49 on May 17 at The Memorial Auditorium (now Convention Center) in Dallas, TX. [File:1976 Cowboys vs. Steelers program. submitted by Ron McKee]

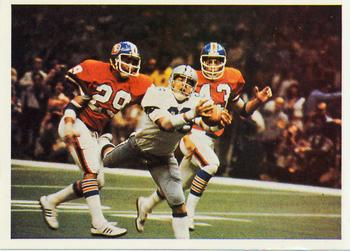
The Cowboys playing against the Broncos in Super Bowl XII.

=== 1977: Second Super Bowl victory ===
The Cowboys began the 1977 season 8–0 before losing in consecutive weeks to the St. Louis Cardinals in a Monday night home game and the Steelers in Pittsburgh. After the losses, however, the Cowboys won their final four regular season games. Dallas had both the #1 defense and #1 offense in the NFL. In the postseason, the Cowboys routed the Chicago Bears 37-7 and Minnesota Vikings 23–6 before defeating the Denver Broncos 27–10 in Super Bowl XII in New Orleans. As a testament to Doomsday's dominance in the hard-hitting game, defensive linemen Randy White and Harvey Martin were named co-Super Bowl MVPs, the first and only time multiple players have received the award.

=== 1978: Fifth Super Bowl appearance ===
After a slow start in 1978, Dallas won its final six regular season games to finish the season at 12–4. After an unexpectedly close divisional playoff game against the Atlanta Falcons at Texas Stadium, the Cowboys traveled to Los Angeles and shut out the Rams in the NFC Championship Game 28–0 to return to the Super Bowl. In Super Bowl XIII, Dallas faced the Steelers at the Orange Bowl in Miami. The Steelers outlasted the Cowboys 35–31, despite a furious comeback that saw Dallas score two touchdowns late in the fourth quarter. The game was not decided until the final 22 seconds, when a Dallas onside kick failed. Bob Ryan, an NFL films editor, dubbed the Cowboys "America's Team" following this season.

=== 1979 ===
Dallas finished the 1979 season 11–5. The team slumped in November but rallied to win its next two games. This set the stage for the regular season finale against Washington, with the winner capturing the NFC East title and the loser missing the playoffs. The Cowboys trailed 17–0, but then scored three touchdowns to take the lead. Led by running back John Riggins, the Redskins came back to build a 34–21 lead, but the Cowboys scored 2 touchdowns in the final five minutes -– including a Staubach touchdown pass to Tony Hill with less than a minute remaining –- for a 35–34 victory. The season ended with a whimper, however, as two weeks later, the underdog Rams traveled to Dallas and upset the Cowboys 21–19 in the divisional round of the playoffs. The Cowboys had a chance to win in the final two minutes after the Rams scored their final touchdown, but the Rams' defense stopped Staubach from making another comeback. The Rams went on to win the NFC Championship Game against the Tampa Bay Buccaneers 9-0 and reach Super Bowl XIV, which they lost to the defending champion, Pittsburgh, by a score of 31–19. After this game, repeated concussions compelled Staubach to announce his retirement a few months later in an emotional press conference at Texas Stadium.

All told, from 1970 through 1979, the Cowboys won 105 regular season games, more than any other NFL franchise during that span.

== 1980s ==
=== 1980–1982: Next year's champions again ===
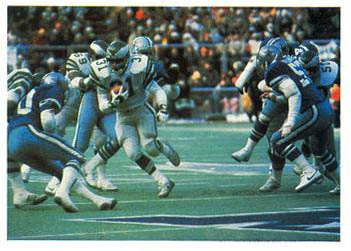
The Cowboys playing the Eagles in the 1980 NFC Championship Game.

Danny White became the Cowboys' starting quarterback in 1980. Without Staubach, not much was expected of the Cowboys, but they surprised everyone with a 12–4 regular season. Philadelphia also finished 12–4 but got the division title on a close tiebreaker. The Cowboys won the wildcard game at home against the Rams, then White engineered a late comeback to win the divisional playoff game in Atlanta. Dallas faced the Eagles in the NFC Championship Game, but lost 20–7 to their division rival in Veterans Stadium.

Dallas started the 1981 season 4–0, and captured the NFC East crown with another 12–4 record. Dallas dismantled the Tampa Bay Buccaneers in the divisional playoff 38–0. They then traveled to San Francisco to face the 49ers in the NFC Championship Game. Dallas led 27–21 with just under five minutes to play in the fourth quarter and appeared to be headed to their sixth Super Bowl appearance in franchise history. However, San Francisco quarterback Joe Montana led a long 49er drive that was capped by a Joe Montana touchdown pass to Dwight Clark with 51 seconds remaining. Dallas was not finished just yet, needing only a field goal to win. A White completion to Drew Pearson moved the ball into 49er territory and almost went for a touchdown. Two plays later, though, White fumbled after being hit, and San Francisco recovered to seal their 28–27 victory. San Francisco went on to win Super Bowl XVI. Clark's leaping grab in the end zone came to be famous as "The Catch", and represented a changing of the guard in the NFC from the dominant Cowboys teams of the 1970s to the dominant 49ers teams of the 1980s.

Dallas finished the strike-shortened 1982 season with a record of 6–3. The Cowboys held a one-game lead over the Redskins with two games to play in the regular season, but fell at home to Philadelphia, then lost a Monday night match in Minnesota (a game best known for Tony Dorsett's NFL record 99-yard touchdown run). Dallas played two home games in the unusual postseason "Super Bowl Tournament", defeating Tampa Bay and Green Bay. In the NFC Championship Game, Washington defeated Dallas 31–17 at RFK Stadium. This finished a remarkable run that saw the Cowboys play in 10 of 13 conference championship games.

=== 1983 ===
In the 1983 season, the Cowboys erased a 23–3 deficit at Washington to defeat the Super Bowl champion Redskins 31–30, then won their next six games. When Dallas and Washington squared off again in Week 15 at Texas Stadium, both teams had 12–2 records. However, the Redskins beat the Cowboys handily in that game, and Dallas subsequently lost its next two games to end its season (a rout by the 49ers in the regular season finale and an upset home loss to the Rams in the wild card playoff game).

=== 1984: 25th season ===
Change and controversy marked the Cowboys' 1984 season (its 25th, which Schramm commemorated as the "Silver Season"). Despite leading Dallas to the playoffs in each of his four seasons as starting quarterback, Danny White began to draw criticism for "not being able to win the big game", and several players privately expressed their preference for backup quarterback Gary Hogeboom. Landry decided to start Hogeboom, and while Dallas started the season 4–1, Hogeboom's inconsistency led to White regaining the starting job, but nevertheless the Cowboys suffered a Week 12 loss to the winless Bills in Buffalo, and needing a win in their final two games to secure a playoff spot, lost both. Dallas finished the 1984 season 9–7, and missed the postseason for the first time in a decade.

An important off-field change also took place in 1984. Clint Murchison, in dire financial straits because of a collapse in oil prices, sold the Cowboys to Dallas oilman H.R. "Bum" Bright in May. Bright voiced full confidence in Schramm, Landry, and Brandt, and largely continued Murchison's hands-off approach.

=== 1985 ===
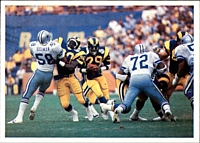
The Cowboys' defense attempting to stop a Rams' rushing play in the 1985-86 NFC Divisional Playoffs Game.

Bright's ownership coincided with a decline in the Cowboys' fortunes. The 1985 season saw an uneven string of wins and losses, the worst being in Week 11 when they were annihilated 44–0 by the unstoppable Chicago Bears, the team's first shutout since 1970. With a 10–6 record, the Cowboys won the division but were blanked by the Rams 20–0 in the playoffs. This was the franchise's final winning season and postseason appearance with Tom Landry as coach.

=== 1986 ===
The 1986 campaign started optimistically, with highly regarded offensive coordinator Paul Hackett and Heisman Trophy-winning Herschel Walker having joined the team. The Cowboys ran their record to 6–2, but White's wrist was broken in a mid-season loss to the Giants, and the team only managed to win one of its final seven games. Dallas finished with a 7–9 record, ending the franchise's streak of 20 consecutive winning seasons that had dated back to its first-ever winning season in 1966. To this date, no other NFL team has successfully matched this feat.

=== 1987 ===
Dallas started the 1987 season 1–1 before NFL players went on strike and management responded by hiring replacement players. Schramm, having anticipated the strike, assembled one of the better replacement teams, which was soon bolstered by several starters who crossed the picket line (including Dorsett, Danny White, and Randy White). However, the "Counterfeit Cowboys" lost at home to a Redskins team composed entirely of replacement players. Once the strike ended, Dallas' regular squad lost six of its next eight games to finish 7–8.

=== 1988: Tom Landry's final season ===
The Cowboys went into a free-fall in 1988. After starting the season 2–2, a last-second loss in New Orleans started a 10-game Cowboy losing streak. They would only win one other game that year to finish 3-13. Among the few bright spots in the season were the team's first-round draft pick, wide receiver Michael Irvin (whom Schramm had predicted would spur the team's "return from the dead"), and a Week 15 victory against the Redskins in Washington, Tom Landry's last.

=== 1989: Troy Aikman and Jerry Jones arrives ===
Bright found himself in dire financial straits in the late 1980s. He lost $29 million after Texas's largest bank failed in 1988, and his savings and loan was seized by federal regulators that same year. With most of his money tied up in the Cowboys, Bright was all but forced to sell the team to Arkansas businessman Jerry Jones on February 25, 1989. The next day, Jones' first act as owner was to fire Landry. The abrupt firing of the only coach the Cowboys had ever known attracted much criticism. In 2016, Jones revealed that Bright offered to fire Landry before the sale closed, knowing Jones would face savage criticism from the press if he did so himself. However, Jones declined the offer, wanting to be the one who made the decision to fire Landry. Earlier, Bright revealed that he had wanted to fire Landry himself as early as 1987, but backed off when Schramm claimed he didn't have a successor in place yet. Landry admitted to becoming more forgetful with play calling and clock management as he passed his 60th birthday, and to being a bit unwilling to adapt his offense for the NFL of the 1980s. Other longtime personnel were soon gone as well; Schramm resigned while Brandt was fired.

Unlike his predecessors, Jones took a very active role in running the team. He installed himself as his own general manager, and replaced Landry with University of Miami head coach Jimmy Johnson, who had played football at Arkansas alongside Jones in the 1960s. With their league-worst record in 1988, Dallas gained the #1 draft pick for 1989, UCLA QB Troy Aikman (Tom Landry had expressed interest in Aikman just before being fired). After Dallas opened the 1989 season 0–5, Johnson traded away Herschel Walker to the Minnesota Vikings for five veteran players and eight draft choices. (A total of 18 players or draft choices were involved in what was the largest trade in NFL history at the time.) The Cowboys finished the 1989 season with a 1–15 record, their worst record since the team's inception. Fellow rookie quarterback Steve Walsh, starting in place of an injured Aikman, led the team to its lone victory in a midseason Sunday night game in Washington.

The two games with Philadelphia in 1989 (which became known as the Bounty Bowls) were marked by hostility between the staff and fans of both teams. Eagles coach Buddy Ryan insulted Jimmy Johnson, saying that he did nothing in his tenure at the University of Miami except run the score up on bad teams and also made fun of his weight. Ryan reputedly wanted his players to injure Cowboys kicker Roger Ruzek, who had been cut from the Eagles early in the season, and in the season-ender in Philadelphia, the Cowboys were pelted with snowballs.

Dallas's 1–15 season of 1989 gave them the league's worst record for the second consecutive year. However, they did not get the #1 draft pick again, as they had forfeited their first-round pick the previous year when they took Steve Walsh in the Supplemental Draft.

== 1990s ==
Johnson quickly returned the Cowboys to the NFL's elite with a series of skillful drafts. Having picked Aikman, fullback Daryl Johnston and center Mark Stepnoski in 1989, Johnson added running back Emmitt Smith in 1990, defensive tackle Russell Maryland and offensive tackle Erik Williams in 1991, and safety Darren Woodson in 1992. The young talent joined holdovers from the Landry era such as wide receiver Michael Irvin, guard Nate Newton, linebacker Ken Norton, Jr., and offensive lineman Mark Tuinei, and veteran pickups such as tight end Jay Novacek and defensive end Charles Haley.

=== 1990 ===
In 1990, the Cowboys finished 7–9, with Smith being named NFC Offensive Rookie of the Year and Johnson earning Coach of the Year honors.

=== 1991 ===
In 1991, Dallas finished with an 11–5 record, making the playoffs for the first time since 1985. The Cowboys beat the Chicago Bears 17–13 in the wild card round. In the divisional round, they faced the Lions, who had beaten them earlier in the season. Detroit went in for a repeat performance, dismembering the Cowboys 38–6 for their first, and until the 2023 season only, postseason victory since 1957. The 1991 Cowboys also became the first team to feature the league leaders in rushing yards (Smith) and receiving yards (Irvin). The 1991 season also marked Dallas's return to Monday Night Football after an absence of two years.

=== 1992: Third Super Bowl victory ===
In 1992, the Cowboys finished with a 13–3 record (second best in the league), boasted the league's #1 defense, reached their peak in popularity (many road fans were cheering for the Cowboys), and finally avenged their 1981 NFC Championship Game loss to San Francisco by defeating the 49ers in the conference title game, 30–20, in a muddy Candlestick Park. The Cowboys went on to crush the Buffalo Bills in Super Bowl XXVII, 52–17, forcing a Super Bowl record nine turnovers. QB Troy Aikman was named MVP after completing 73.3% of his passes for 273 yards, four touchdowns, and no interceptions for a passer rating of 140.7, and even out rushed Bills running back Thurman Thomas 28 yards to 19 yards. Emmitt Smith rushed for 108 yards, and became the first NFL rushing champion to win a Super Bowl in the same season. Coach Johnson became the first coach to claim a National Championship in college football and a Super Bowl victory in professional football.

=== 1993: Fourth Super Bowl victory ===
The following season, the Cowboys finished with a 12–4 record in the regular season. They again defeated the 49ers in the NFC Championship, this time by a score of 38–21 at Texas Stadium, and again defeated the Buffalo Bills in the Super Bowl, this time by a score of 30–13. The Cowboys sent an NFL record 11 players to the Pro Bowl: Troy Aikman, Emmitt Smith, Michael Irvin, Thomas Everett, Daryl Johnston, Russell Maryland, Nate Newton, Ken Norton Jr, Jay Novacek, Mark Stepnoski and Erik Williams. Emmitt Smith won his third rushing title despite missing the first two games of the season, which the Cowboys went 0–2 in, over a contract dispute, and was named both NFL and Super Bowl MVP. Smith is one of only six players to win both the NFL MVP award and Super Bowl MVP award in the same season, and is the only one of those six players who was not a quarterback.

=== Switzer era ===
==== 1994: Attempt of a three-peat thwarted ====
Only weeks after Super Bowl XXVIII, however, friction between Johnson and Jones culminated in Johnson stunning the football world by announcing his resignation. The next day Jones hired former University of Oklahoma head coach Barry Switzer to replace Johnson. Norton and guard Kevin Gogan departed via free agency, but Dallas drafted offensive lineman Larry Allen, who became a mainstay on the line for the next decade. In 1994, the Cowboys played before the largest crowd to ever attend an NFL game when 112,376 in Mexico City turned out for a preseason match against the Houston Oilers. The Cowboys cruised to another NFC East title in 1994. They finished the regular season 12–4, with their four losses coming by a combined 20 points. The team suffered key injuries, however, when Erik Williams was lost for the year after a mid-season auto accident and Emmitt Smith was hobbled for the final month with a pulled hamstring. Dallas advanced to the NFC Championship Game, where they faced San Francisco for the third consecutive year. Dallas fell behind 21–0 in the first quarter, and despite a later comeback, the 49ers held on to win 38–28, thus denying the Cowboys their chance of winning a record three consecutive Super Bowls.

==== 1995: Fifth Super Bowl victory ====
In 1995, Jones made a huge free agent splash by signing All-Pro corner Deion Sanders away from San Francisco. Dallas posted another 12–4 regular season record and NFC East crown. Emmitt Smith won his Third rushing title and scored a then NFL record 25 rushing touchdowns. After crushing the Eagles 30–11 in the divisional playoffs, the Cowboys earned their 8th NFC Championship title by defeating the Green Bay Packers 38–27 at Texas Stadium. The Cowboys then topped the Pittsburgh Steelers in Super Bowl XXX 27–17, avenging two four-point losses to Pittsburgh in Super Bowls X and XIII. Coach Switzer followed Johnson to become the second coach to claim a National Championship in college football and a Super Bowl victory in professional football. Only one other coach, Pete Carroll, has since accomplished this feat. Since then, Dallas has never returned to the NFC Conference Championship game.

==== 1996 ====
Injuries and off-field incidents deviled the 1996 Cowboys. Novacek, possibly Aikman's most trusted target, suffered an off-season back injury that ended his career. Irvin was convicted of narcotics possession and suspended for the first five games of the season. In December defensive tackle Leon Lett was given a one-year suspension for failing a narcotics test. Late in the season Irvin and Williams drew national attention when they were accused of assaulting a Dallas woman, although the allegations were later recanted. Haley and Emmitt Smith were also plagued by injuries during the season. Yet Dallas still managed to earn its fifth consecutive NFC East title with a 10–6 record. The Cowboys thumped the Vikings 40–15 in the first round of the playoffs, then traveled to Carolina, where they lost to the upstart Panthers 26–17 after Irvin and Sanders left the game with injuries.

==== 1997 ====
Preseason pundits again put the Cowboys at the top of the NFC in 1997. However, Dallas finished the season with a disappointing 6–10 record as continued discipline and off-field problems became major distractions. Switzer was arrested during the preseason after a handgun was found in his luggage at an airport metal detector. The team collapsed down the stretch, losing its final five games. Switzer resigned as head coach in January 1998 and was replaced by former Steelers offensive coordinator Chan Gailey.

=== Gailey era ===
==== 1998 ====
After missing the playoffs in 1997, Gailey led the team to a 10–6 record in 1998 as Dallas became the first NFC East team to sweep the division. The Cowboys left the playoffs in the first round, however, when the Arizona Cardinals defeated them at Texas Stadium 20–7 for their first postseason victory in half a century. Jones raised hopes in the off-season, signing fleet-footed wide receiver Raghib "Rocket" Ismail.

==== 1999 ====
The Cowboys started the 1999 campaign by erasing a 21-point deficit in Washington on opening day for a 41–35 overtime victory. In their fourth game of the season, however, Dallas lost Irvin to a neck injury that ended his career. Darryl Johnston also suffered a career-ending injury early in the season, and Aikman, Allen, Sanders and cornerback Kevin Smith missed time as well. Dallas sputtered to an 8–8 finish in 1999. They gained a wild-card berth in their final regular season game, but lost in Minnesota in the first round of the playoffs, 27–10. Key players were now grumbling about Gailey, and Jones fired him in January 2000.

== 2000s ==
=== Dave Campo era (2000–2002) ===
Defensive coordinator Dave Campo was promoted to head coach, but he could only post three consecutive 5–11 seasons. Instability plagued the quarterback position after several concussions; the first suffered on opening day against the Eagles (known as the Pickle Juice Game because Eagles players drank pickle juice at halftime Source), finally ended Aikman's career late in the 2000 season; five different quarterbacks started between 2001 and 2002. The lowest point of the Campo era was an embarrassing and humiliating loss on opening night of the 2002 season to the brand-new Houston Texans. One of the only highlights of this era occurred on October 27, 2002, when running back Emmitt Smith broke Walter Payton's all-time career yardage rushing record during a 17–14 home loss to the Seattle Seahawks. Many fans and media blamed Jerry Jones for the team's ills, noting that he refused to hire a strong coach, preferring to hire coaches who did not want to be involved with personnel duties so that Jones himself could manage them.

=== Parcells era (2003–2006) ===
==== 2003 ====
However, Jones proved them wrong in 2003 by luring Bill Parcells out of retirement to coach the Cowboys. The Cowboys became the surprise team of the 2003 season, posting a 10–6 record and a playoff berth by leading the NFL in sacks, turnovers and having the best overall defense in the NFL. However, they lost to the eventual NFC champion Carolina Panthers in the wild-card round, 29–10.

==== 2004 ====
The 2004 season was one of turmoil. Injuries and persistent penalty problems plagued the Cowboys, who were shaken early in training camp when starting quarterback Quincy Carter was suddenly released, allegedly for drug use. 40-year-old veteran Vinny Testaverde, recently brought in by former coach Parcells to be the back-up, became the starter. They had only a 3–5 record at midseason, but injured rookie running back Julius Jones returned in late November, and in consecutive games logged two of the best single-game performances in franchise history. Dallas went 1–3 down the stretch, though, finishing the season 6–10.

In November 2004, a vote was passed by the City of Arlington in Tarrant County to build a new stadium adjacent to the existing Ameriquest Field in Arlington. The team began playing at the new site in 2009 after 38 years playing in the city of Irving, and 49 years in Dallas County.

==== 2005 ====
The Cowboys improved their defense before the 2005 season, adding DeMarcus Ware, Marcus Spears, Kevin Burnett, and Chris Canty through the draft. Parcells hoped to jumpstart the team's transition from the traditional 4–3 defense, which had been the Cowboys' base defense for the past 20 years, to his preferred 3–4 defense, which he believed favors the talents of the current lineup (speed and athleticism over power). Jerry Jones also added a number of veterans, including nose tackle Jason Ferguson and cornerback Anthony Henry via free agency. On offense, the Cowboys tried to upgrade their passing game by signing free agent quarterback Drew Bledsoe. Bledsoe had a solid year and gave the Cowboys stability at the quarterback position, which had been lacking since Troy Aikman's retirement five years earlier. The Cowboys endured an up-and-down 2005 season. An injury to kicker Billy Cundiff led to inconsistency at that position, and costly misses contributed to close losses against the Seattle Seahawks and Denver Broncos on Thanksgiving Day. Shortly before the regular season finale, the Cowboys learned that they had been eliminated from the playoff chase, and turned in a listless performances against the St. Louis Rams on ESPN Sunday Night Football to finish the season 9–7, 3rd place in the NFC East.

==== 2006 ====
The Cowboys got off to a mediocre 3–2 start before an important Monday Night Football game against division rivals, the New York Giants. The team lost 36–22 despite "a changing of guard" at the quarterback position from Drew Bledsoe to Tony Romo. With the next three games on the road, speculation grew that the Giants could run away with the division for a second straight year. Romo won his first game as a starter the following week against the Carolina Panthers with a 4th quarter comeback to win (35–14). The Cowboys' chance to challenge the Giants seemingly fizzled when they lost to the Washington Redskins at FedExField on a last-second field goal (the "Hand of God" game).

However, the Giants entered a slump, and Tony Romo impressed the media as a quarterback, revitalizing the Cowboys with a 27–10 win over the Arizona Cardinals, a well-earned (21–14) victory over the previously unbeaten Indianapolis Colts, and a thorough routing of the Tampa Bay Buccaneers (38–10) on Thanksgiving Day. During that home game, Romo solidified his position as quarterback and completed 22-of-29 passes for 306 yards and five touchdowns (tying a franchise record). Furthermore, the Cowboys took a two-game lead of the NFC East by beating the Giants in a Week 13 rematch. The success of the new quarterback surprised much of the nation and helped Romo receive much air-time on sports shows.

The Cowboys then lost three of their last four games of the season, losing to the New Orleans Saints in a battle for second-best record in the league, to the Philadelphia Eagles in a Christmas Day game that would have earned them the division championship if they had won, and to the 2–13 Detroit Lions in a game where Tony Romo's four fumbles cast significant doubt on his ability to successfully lead his team in the playoffs. The Cowboys played a wild card matchup at Seattle to start the playoffs. Leading 20–13 with 6:42 left in the game with the ball at their own 1-yard line, Romo threw a short pass to Terry Glenn where he fumbled it, and it went out of bounds in the endzone resulting in a safety. The Seahawks got the ball back, and Matt Hasselbeck threw a touchdown to Jerramy Stevens to take a 21–20 lead after missing the two-point conversion. With 1:19 left in the game, the Cowboys had a chance win the game on a 19-yard field goal, but the hold was fumbled by Romo, who continued to serve as field goal holder even after ascending to the starting quarterback's role (the backup quarterback is traditionally the holder on field goals). He picked up the loose ball and tried to run it to the 1-yard line for a first down, but was tackled at the 2. As the game came to a close, the Cowboys got the ball back with two seconds left, but Romo's Hail Mary pass attempt to the endzone fell incomplete.

On January 22, at the conclusion of the Cowboys' season, head coach Bill Parcells retired. On February 8, after a replacement search that included Mike Singletary, Jason Garrett, Jim Caldwell, Ron Rivera and Norv Turner, San Diego defensive coordinator Wade Phillips was hired as the new head coach. Jerry Jones eventually hired Garrett as offensive coordinator (even before hiring Phillips). Phillips has since hired his son Wes Phillips, and former linebacker Dat Nguyen to his new list of assistant coaches.

=== Phillips era ===
==== 2007 ====
During the 2007 offseason, the Cowboys signed offensive lineman Leonard Davis and quarterback Brad Johnson to back up Tony Romo and have also resigned center Andre Gurode and kicker Martin Gramatica. They also released two players; quarterback Drew Bledsoe and tight end Ryan Hannam. Tony Romo also received a $67.5 million contract for six years with the Dallas Cowboys on October 30, 2007, making Romo the third highest paid quarterback in the NFL, after Peyton Manning of the Indianapolis Colts and Carson Palmer of the Cincinnati Bengals.

The Cowboys tied a franchise record in 2007 with by winning 13 regular season games, a feat that had been accomplished 15 years earlier by their 1992 Super Bowl winning squad. Terrell Owens had arguably the most productive year in his career and franchise history. He tied the franchise record for most scoring receptions in a single game (four). When Owens caught a touchdown pass in Week 16 against the Panthers, he set the franchise record for most touchdown receptions in a single season (15). Tony Romo set team records in Touchdowns (36) and Passing Yards (4,211) in one season. After receiving the top NFC playoff seed, and getting a first-round bye, they lost to the Giants in the divisional round of the playoffs.

In week 5 against the Buffalo Bills on Monday Night Football, the Cowboys turned the ball over six times, including five interceptions thrown by Romo. Despite having a -5 turnover margin, the Cowboys defeated the Bills. Trailing 24–22 in the final moments of the game, Dallas sent rookie kicker Nick Folk out to attempt a potential 53-yard game winner. His first kick sailed through the uprights but didn't count because Buffalo called a timeout immediately before the snap. Folk had to attempt the kick a second time, and hammered it through the goalposts again to finish a dramatic victory.

In week 9, tight end Jason Witten, who already had a reputation as a tough and intense player, caught a 25-yard pass from Romo. Immediately after the catch, two Eagles delivered a hit that knocked Witten's helmet off. Unfazed by the contact, Witten ran another 30 yards without a helmet. When he was finally dragged down at the Eagles' 6, he walked to the sideline with a bloody nose. Thanks to their dramatic victory over the Bills in Week 5, Dallas started with a 5–0 record. They were the last team in the NFC to remain undefeated up to that point heading into their next game against the 5-0 New England Patriots. The Patriots won 48–27, handing the Cowboys their first loss of the season, and remained undefeated until they lost that season's Super Bowl. Besides the loss to the Patriots in Week 6, their only other losses came in Weeks 15 and 17 against their division rivals Philadelphia and Washington. When wide receiver Terrell Owens went down with an ankle injury against the Panthers in Week 16, and missed Week 17 against the Redskins, the offense became stagnant. Another match in the season, the Week 13 game against Green Bay, resulted in a 37–27 Dallas win that was reminiscent of the 1990s Cowboys-Packers duels.

Like the Cowboys, the Packers finished the regular season 13–3, but Dallas got the #1 seed due to a better conference record and head-to-head win. This gave them both a first-round bye and home field advantage throughout the NFC playoffs. However, they lost their first playoff game to the eventual Super Bowl champion New York Giants, a team that they had defeated in their two regular-season matchups. Dallas was the first number one seed in the NFC to lose in the divisional round since 1990. Meanwhile, the Giants went on to topple Green Bay in the NFC Championship and upset the 18-0 New England Patriots in the Super Bowl. A record thirteen members of the Cowboys were named to the Pro Bowl, while five were named All-Pro by the Associated Press.

==== 2008: Last season in Texas Stadium ====
The Cowboys began the 2008 season by defeating the Cleveland Browns 28–10. Coming off their commanding road win over the Browns, the Cowboys played their Week 2 home opener under the MNF spotlight. In the last MNF game at Texas Stadium, Dallas dueled with their NFC East foe, the Philadelphia Eagles. In the first quarter, the Cowboys trailed early as Eagles kicker David Akers got a 34-yard field goal. Dallas answered in their first possession with quarterback Tony Romo completing a 72-yard touchdown pass to wide receiver Terrell Owens. In a game that had nine lead changes, it also set different point records, including most first-half points in MNF history (54) and most combined points in the rivalry's history (78). Dallas held on to win 41–37. After starting 4–1 the Cowboys flew to the University of Phoenix Stadium for a Week 6 showdown with the Arizona Cardinals. The Cardinals returned the opening kick return for a touchdown but Dallas tied the game 7–7 at halftime. With only 3:17 left in the 4th quarter Tony Romo completed a 70-yard pass to Marion Barber III and the kicker Nick Folk hit a 52-yard field goal as time expired to send the game into overtime. In overtime the Cowboys punter Mat McBriar had a punt blocked and returned for a touchdown. Also in overtime, quarterback Tony Romo broke his right pinkie finger.

In the week following the game Tony Romo was listed as questionable and then missed three games. In addition, Matt McBriar and Sam Hurd were placed in injured reserve, and Felix Jones was listed as out for 2–3 weeks with a hamstring injury. Furthermore, Adam (Pacman) Jones was suspended by the NFL for a minimum of four weeks after an altercation with his bodyguard. Lastly The Cowboys traded for wide receiver Roy Williams with the Detroit Lions, in exchange for their first, third, and sixth-round picks. After the bye week, they won another four game, Dallas finished the season 1–3, losing its final game in Texas Stadium to the Baltimore Ravens 33–24 followed by a 44–6 loss to Philadelphia. With a 9–7 record, the team finished third in the division and failed to qualify for the playoffs. After the season ended, Owens was released after receiving a $34 million extension the previous June that was supposed to allow him to retire as a Cowboy. Jones said he released Owens because of production, adding that "in this particular case, we have an outstanding player in Roy Williams, and it was a significant factor in the decision I made to release Terrell." In three seasons with the Cowboys, Owens had 235 receptions for 3,587 yards and 38 touchdowns, but his numbers declined last season, when he had 69 receptions for 1,052 yards and 10 touchdowns.

==== 2009: 50th season and first season in AT&T stadium ====
The 2009 season marked the 50th season of play for the Cowboys. In May of that year, the new Cowboys Stadium was completed in Arlington, Texas. It was widely criticized for its appearance, cost (over $1 billion) and high energy use. The first game played in the team's new home was a preseason match with the Tennessee Titans on August 21, and the first regular season one was a three-point loss to the Giants on September 20. By Week 9, the Cowboys stood at 6–2 after defeating their archrival Eagles in Philadelphia. Then followed a loss to the Packers, and victories over Washington and Oakland, the latter being on Thanksgiving Day. The team then fell to the Giants a second time, and lost at home to the Chargers.

By this point, the Cowboys' playoff chances were doubtful, and the old talk of the "December curse" reappeared. The next game was an upset of the 13–0 New Orleans Saints, followed by a shutout of Washington. Combined with Giants defeats, the Cowboys now found themselves guaranteed a wild card spot at the minimum. On January 3, they hosted the Eagles, who had won their last five games. Philadelphia's offense completely folded, and the team suffered a 24–0 shutout, making this the first time in franchise history that Dallas blanked two consecutive opponents. This gave them the division title and the #3 NFC seed, but also gave their opponent a wild card, which meant that they had to play in Dallas again the following week. The rematch saw the Eagles score 17 points, but their defense, which had been considered one of the NFL's best a few weeks earlier, again performed poorly and the Cowboys put up 34 points, to beat them for the third time in one season. Having won their first playoff game since 1996, the Cowboys traveled to the Hubert H. Humphrey Metrodome to face Brett Favre and the Vikings. Their season quickly ended after Minnesota scored four touchdowns and limited them to a single field goal. Linebacker Keith Brooking criticized the last touchdown pass of the game, arguing that it served no purpose other than to run up the score in a game the Vikings already had won.

== 2010s ==
=== 2010 ===
The Cowboys opened 2010 on the road against a revitalized Washington Redskins team that now featured Donovan McNabb (traded from the Philadelphia Eagles in April) and former Denver Broncos head coach Mike Shanahan. Although neither team performed well, the Cowboys lost unexpectedly when on the last play of the game Tony Romo threw a touchdown pass into the end zone that was nullified by a holding penalty. The Redskins thus won 13–7. In Week 2, the Cowboys fell to the Chicago Bears 27–20 in their second straight home opener loss. This was also the team's first 0–2 start since 2001. Desperate to win, they headed to Houston for the third "Battle of Texas" with the Houston Texans (the first and second were in 2002 and 2006) and beat them 27–13.

After coming back from their bye week, the Cowboys lost at home again, this time against the Tennessee Titans. The Cowboys' fortunes continued to slide in Week 6 as they lost to the Minnesota Vikings 24–21. Things steadily got worse the next week as Tony Romo was knocked out with a fractured collarbone while playing the New York Giants on Monday Night Football. Filling in for him was 38-year-old quarterback Jon Kitna, who had not started in two years. Although rusty, he managed two touchdown passes and the Cowboys scored 35 points. But the Giants edged the Cowboys out 41–35 to win in Cowboys Stadium for the second straight year.

By Week 8, the Cowboys found themselves at 1–6 after losing at home to the Jacksonville Jaguars after four Jon Kitna interceptions. After a disastrous 45–7 loss to the Green Bay Packers, Wade Phillips was fired (thus breaking Jerry Jones's policy of not changing head coaches during the season) and replaced by offensive coordinator Jason Garrett. The Cowboys headed to New York for a rematch with the Giants. This time things were different as Jon Kitna passed for 327 yards and three touchdowns. An all-around better performance by the team allowed them to win 33–20. After beating the Detroit Lions at home, the Cowboys lost a close Thanksgiving Day game to the New Orleans Saints. The Cowboys next defeated the Indianapolis Colts on the road 38–35 on an overtime field goal to retain faint playoff hopes. However, a home loss to the Philadelphia Eagles mathematically eliminated the Cowboys from playoff contention. Week 15 saw the Cowboys beat the hapless Redskins 33–30. The Cowboys then lost a meaningless Christmas Day game to the Arizona Cardinals and followed that with a meaningless win over the Eagles to end their season at 6–10.

=== Jason Garrett era (2011–2019) ===
==== 2011 ====
After going 5–3 as interim head coach during the last eight games of the previous season, Jason Garrett took the head coaching position full-time. With Tony Romo back in action, the Cowboys took on the New York Jets for a Sunday Night game commemorating the 10-year anniversary of the September 11, 2001 terrorist attacks. An early lead soon led to a 24–24 tie, but Romo threw an interception in the 4th quarter that allowed the Jets to get into the red zone and score a field goal, resulting in the Cowboys losing 27–24. The next week, the Cowboys defeated the San Francisco 49ers 27–24 in overtime after Romo made a valiant overtime comeback effort despite playing through a painful rib injury. Despite this and a punctured lung, Romo started in Week 3 as the Cowboys hosted the Washington Redskins on Monday Night Football. They won 18–16 in a game with six field goals from rookie kicker Dan Bailey. Dallas's offense struggled the entire night with Romo handicapped by pain, multiple dropped passes, and several botched snaps from rookie center Kevin Kowalski.

The Cowboys went 1–3 in the month of October including a Week 8 34–7 loss by the division rival Philadelphia Eagles. They turned things around by going undefeated in November. That run included a Week 10 44–7 blowout over the Buffalo Bills. Week 11 was a 27–24 overtime victory over the Redskins. They entered December with a 7–4 record vying for first place of their division with the New York Giants, whom the Cowboys were yet to play. After losing 19–13 in overtime against the Arizona Cardinals in Week 13, they headed to a Sunday Night primetime home game against the Giants. Despite leading 34–22 with less than 6 minutes to play, the Cowboys lost 37–34 after a game-tying field goal by Dan Bailey was blocked by Jason Pierre-Paul. They rebounded by the next week by defeating the Tampa Bay Buccaneers 31–15. Week 16 brought a second loss to the Eagles. Despite entering Week 17 with an 8–7 record, the Cowboys were in a position to win the division. However, so was their final regular season opponent the Giants. However, the Cowboys lost 31–14 to finish the season 8–8 and miss the playoffs for the second straight season while the Giants went on to win Super Bowl XLVI against the New England Patriots.

==== 2012 ====
The Cowboys started the 2012 season by defeating the defending Super Bowl champion New York Giants 24–17. They were unable to capitalize on their momentum, though, as they dropped three out of their next four games. One of those losses was a tight 31–29 game to the eventual Super Bowl XLVII champion Baltimore Ravens. They entered their annual Thanksgiving Day game with a 5–5 record. Their opponent was the upstart division rival Washington Redskins whom were being led by rookie quarterback Robert Griffin III. The Redskins got off to a quick start leading 28–3 at halftime. The Cowboys fought back in the second half, but it was not enough, and the game ended in a 38–31 loss. The Cowboys won their next three games before losing in Week 16 to the New Orleans Saints in overtime. Going into Week 17 they were once again one win away from winning their division, but so were their opponents that week, the Redskins. The game was tight throughout. With less than 3 minutes to go, the Cowboys were down 21–18 but had the ball and were starting to drive down the field. Tony Romo threw a game-ending interception, though, and they lost 28–18, ending their season with an 8–8 record and missing the playoffs for the third straight year.

==== 2013 ====
The Cowboys opened the 2013 season by defeating their division rival New York Giants 36–31. This win was punctuated after Giants quarterback Eli Manning threw an interception to Brandon Carr whom returned it for a touchdown. This was the first time the Cowboys had defeated the Giants at home since 2008. Just like the previous year, the Cowboys lost three of their next four games. The third loss of that run was a shootout to the eventual AFC Champion Denver Broncos 51–48. Tony Romo threw for over 500 yards with five touchdowns. However, late in the 4th quarter with the game tied at 48 he threw an interception to Danny Trevathan which set up the Broncos' winning field goal. They rebounded in Week 6 by decisively defeating the division rival Washington Redskins 31–16. Week 7 brought another division game, this time against the Philadelphia Eagles, and a 17–3 win. However, the next week they lost to the Detroit Lions in a tight 31–30 loss to end the month of October.

They went 3–1 in the month of November which included a Week 10 49–17 blowout loss to the New Orleans Saints, and another win over the Giants. They began December with two crucial losses to the Chicago Bears 45–28 and to the Green Bay Packers 37–36. The Week 15 loss to the Packers was especially noteworthy since the Cowboys had a 26–3 halftime lead. Talk of the annual "December Curse" was in full effect. They came into their Week 16 division matchup against the Redskins with a 7–7 record but still in the hunt with the Eagles for the NFC East crown. In the game they started the 4th quarter down 23–14. They battled back to win 24–23. The win was highlighted by a 4th and goal touchdown pass from Romo to DeMarco Murray from the 12 yard line with 1:15 left. However, Romo received a serious back injury during the 4th quarter. While he was able to finish the game, the injury prematurely ended his season. For the third consecutive year the Cowboys entered Week 17 one win away from the division title along with their opponents the Eagles. The Cowboys came into the game with a 5–0 division record. With Romo out, backup quarterback Kyle Orton started. With less than 2 minutes left and being down 24–22, Orton threw a game-ending interception, losing the game, finishing 8-8 and missing the playoffs for the fourth straight season.

==== 2014 ====
After starting 2014 with a 28–17 loss to the San Francisco 49ers, the Cowboys went on a roll, winning their next six games. It was their longest winning streak since 2007, and included a win against the defending Super Bowl XLVIII champion Seattle Seahawks 30–23. The Seahawks' loss in that game was only their second home loss in the past three seasons. The streak was ended by their division rival Washington Redskins in overtime 20–17. However, Romo once again injured his back. He was out the next game against the Arizona Cardinals where backup Brandon Weeden started, and the Cardinals won 28–17. Romo returned in Week 10 as the Cowboys played in London for the first time ever against the Jacksonville Jaguars in the NFL International Series in which they won 31–17. The Cowboys entered their annual Thanksgiving Day game with an 8–3 record, identical with their opponents, the Philadelphia Eagles. The Eagles got off to a fast start, and the Cowboys were never able to catch up, thus the Eagles won 33–10. They rebounded the next week over the Chicago Bears 41–28 to clinch their first winning season since 2009.

Week 15 was a rematch against the Eagles. This time the Cowboys got off to a hot start, going up 21–0. However, the Eagles then scored 24 unanswered points. The Cowboys came back with a 78-yard drive capped with a DeMarco Murray touchdown run. The next Eagles drive ended with Mark Sanchez getting intercepted by Cowboys safety J.J. Wilcox. The Cowboys took full advantage of that, with Dez Bryant scoring his third touchdown of the evening, the most in one game in his career. The Eagles had two more turnovers, including another Sanchez interception to end the game. The Cowboys won 38–27 to take over first place. Week 16 started with the Eagles losing to the Redskins 27–24, meaning the Cowboys would clinch their division if they were able to beat the Indianapolis Colts. They responded by routing the Colts 42–7 to win the NFC East and make the playoffs for the first time since 2009. Their final regular-season game was on the road against the Redskins, where the Cowboys won 44–17 to finish the season at 12–4, the #3 seed, and undefeated in away games. They also finished December 4–0 which was huge after they had struggled in the month of December during recent years.

In the wild-card round of the 2014–15 NFL playoffs the Cowboys hosted the sixth-seeded Detroit Lions. The Lions went 14–0 in the first quarter, and the Cowboys initially struggled on both sides of the ball. However, toward the end of the 2nd quarter Romo connected to Terrance Williams for a 76-yard touchdown pass. The Lions hit a field goal before halftime to go up 17–7. The Cowboys started the second half by picking off Lions quarterback Matthew Stafford on the first play of the 3rd quarter. Dan Bailey missed a field goal during their ensuing drive. The Lions then kicked another field goal to make the score 20–7. A DeMarco Murray touchdown run later in that quarter closed the gap to 20–14. A 51-yard field goal almost 3 minutes into the 4th quarter put the Cowboys down by 3. The Lions got the ball back and started driving down the field. A 17-yard pass on 3rd down from Stafford to Lions tight end Brandon Pettigrew was initially flagged as defensive pass interference against Cowboys linebacker Anthony Hitchens. The flag was then picked up by the officiating crew and the penalty was nullified. Dallas got the ball back on their 41-yard line and had a 59-yard drive, capped off by an 8-yard touchdown pass from Romo to Williams to give the Cowboys their first lead of the game 24–20. The Lions got the ball back with less than 2:30 to play. Stafford fumbled the ball at the 2-minute mark and was picked up by Cowboys defensive tackle DeMarcus Lawrence who then fumbled the ball, which gave the Lions the ball back. Lawrence then sacked Stafford on a 4th and 3 play which led to Stafford fumbling the ball again which Lawrence recovered to end the game, winning 24–20. This was the first time in franchise playoff history that the Cowboys had been down by more than 10 points at halftime to come back and win the game.

For the divisional round they faced the Green Bay Packers in their first postseason matchup in Green Bay since the Ice Bowl. There was a lot of hype in the week leading up to the game, as during the regular season, the Packers had gone 8–0 at home while the Cowboys had gone 8–0 on the road. At halftime the Cowboys had a 14–10 lead and went up 21–13 in the 3rd quarter. However, the Packers came back to take a 26–21 lead in the 4th quarter. With less than 5 minutes in the game on a 4th and 3 play Romo threw a 30-yard pass to Bryant to put them at the 1-yard line. However, Packers head coach Mike McCarthy challenged the catch and the ruling was overturned. The explanation given was that Bryant did not maintain control of the ball as he came down with it. The ball was turned over on downs and the Packers ran the clock out to win the game 26–21, thus ending the Cowboys' season.

Two days after the game, Cowboys head coach Jason Garrett signed a 5-year, $30 million contract along with defensive coordinator Rod Marinelli, who signed a 3-year contract. Marinelli was largely credited for greatly improving the Cowboys defense, which was the worst-ranked defense the previous season under Monte Kiffin.

==== 2015 ====
After their successful 2014 season, the Cowboys began the 2015 season with high expectations. During Week 1, Tony Romo led the team to a comeback against the New York Giants for a 27–26 win, despite the loss of Dez Bryant. The next week against the Philadelphia Eagles, Romo was taken out with a collarbone injury, but the Cowboys won 20–10 to give them a 2–0 start. Romo missed the next seven games, and the Cowboys lost all of those games to drop to 2–7. Romo finally returned in Week 11 to lead the Cowboys to a 24–14 victory against the Miami Dolphins, but in the Cowboys' next game on Thanksgiving Day, Romo injured his collarbone again and was ruled out for the rest of the season, and the team was slaughtered by the then-undefeated Carolina Panthers 33–14, dropping their record to 3–8. In the next game on Monday Night Football, the Cowboys defeated the Washington Redskins 19–16, which proved to be their last win of the season and their only win without Romo as starter. In Week 14, the Cowboys lost to the Green Bay Packers 28–7. In Week 15, the Cowboys were eliminated from playoff contention with a 19–16 loss to the New York Jets in a Saturday night edition of Thursday Night Football. After that, the Cowboys lost to the Buffalo Bills 16–6 and then lost against the Redskins 34–23 to finish the regular season with a record of 4-12 and a last-place finish in the NFC East. The Cowboys went 3–1 with Romo as the starting quarterback, but they were 1–11 in all of their other games.

==== 2016: Dak Prescott arrives ====
The Cowboys drafted running back Ezekiel Elliott from Ohio State in the first round and quarterback Dak Prescott from Mississippi State in the third round of the 2016 NFL draft. During a preseason game against the Seattle Seahawks, Tony Romo suffered a back injury, allowing Prescott to become starter for the 2016 season. With Prescott's stellar play, along with Elliott's running game, the Cowboys finished with a 13–3 record, earning them home field advantage throughout the playoffs. But the Cowboys' promising season ended with a 34–31 loss to Aaron Rodgers and the Green Bay Packers. After the season, Romo retired after 14 seasons with the Cowboys, and Prescott was named Offensive Rookie of the year.

==== 2017 ====
2017 was a tumultuous season for the Cowboys. In August the NFL announced that star running back Ezekiel Elliott would be suspended the first six games of the season for violating the league's personal conduct policy, after accusations of domestic abuse from an ex-girlfriend in 2016. Elliott maintained his innocence and was never criminally charged. The suspension was on and off again through the first two months of the season due to him attempting to appeal this decision.

The Cowboys started the season by defeating the New York Giants 19–3. During Week 2 they were routed by the Denver Broncos 42–17. They bounced back in Week 3 winning on the road against the Arizona Cardinals 28–17. They returned home for a two-game homestand and lost both games, first to the Los Angeles Rams 35–30 then to the Green Bay Packers 35–31.

After a Week 6 bye they returned to form by blowing out the San Francisco 49ers 40–10. Week 8 was a division game against the Washington Redskins, in which the Cowboys won 33–19. In Week 9 the Cowboys faced the Kansas City Chiefs, and became the first team that season to intercept Chiefs quarterback Alex Smith en route to a 28–17 win. It was the Cowboys' third straight win which brought them to 5–3.

After this game, Elliott's suspension came into effect. The Cowboys would lose their next three games to the Atlanta Falcons 27–7, division-leading Philadelphia Eagles 37–9, and on Thanksgiving Day to the Los Angeles Chargers 28–6. On Week 13 they hosted the Redskins in which the Cowboys showed their season was far from over by defeating the Redskins 38–14. Former Redskins running back Alfred Morris rushed for 127 yards with one touchdown against his former team. Dez Bryant caught a touchdown which made him the Cowboys' all-time leader in receiving touchdowns. Week 14 was another division game against the Giants, in which the Cowboys won 30–10. Week 15 was a primetime game on NBC Sunday Night Football against the Oakland Raiders. The Cowboys had a late 20–17 lead when a defensive pass interference against them put the Raiders in the red zone with less than a minute left. Raiders quarterback Derek Carr tried rushing in a potential game-winning touchdown but Cowboys safety Jeff Heath caused Carr to fumble the ball before the ball crossed the endzone to force a touchback and seal a 20-17 Cowboys victory.

Elliott returned from his suspension on Week 16 against the Seattle Seahawks. Despite this the Seahawks prevailed 21–12 to eliminate the Cowboys from playoff contention. Their season ended on a 6–0 win against the Eagles to finish with a 9-7 second place record. The Eagles would go on to win Super Bowl LII against the New England Patriots.

==== 2018 ====
Before the 2018 season began the Cowboys parted ways with three of their key offensive players. Wide receiver Dez Bryant was released in April 2018. His performance had steadily declined since the 2015 season. During the 2017 season he started having sideline outbursts. Longtime tight end Jason Witten retired in May after 15 seasons (though he would return in 2019 and spend one season with the Raiders in 2020 before fully retiring). Lastly, the franchise's most successful kicker Dan Bailey was cut on September 1 after losing the job to former CFL kicker Brett Maher. Other additions prior to the start of the season was former Jacksonville Jaguars wide receiver Allen Hurns who signed for two years and wide receiver Tavon Austin whom the Cowboys received from the Los Angeles Rams in exchange for a 2019 sixth-round draft pick.

The season started out with a loss to the Carolina Panthers 16–8. The following week they bounced back to beat the New York Giants 20–13. Week 3 against the Seattle Seahawks was a mess offensively as Dak Prescott threw two costly interceptions. Ezekiel Elliott also had a 4th quarter fumble that ended any chance of a comeback. The Seahawks prevailed with a 24–13 victory. In Week 4 the Cowboys beat the Detroit Lions 26–24 thanks to a game-winning field goal by Maher as time expired.

October was not a good month for the Cowboys as they went 1–2. In Week 5, they lost to the Houston Texans 19–16 in overtime. In Week 6, they defeated the Jacksonville Jaguars 40–7. In Week 7, the Cowboys lost to the Washington Redskins 20–17 after Maher missed a game-tying field goal.

Cowboys owner and general manager Jerry Jones traded their number one 2019 draft pick to the Oakland Raiders for their star wide receiver Amari Cooper. They had a Week 8 bye and then hosted the Tennessee Titans the week after. The Cowboys had won their first three games at home that season and when the Titans had two 1st quarter turnovers along with Cooper's first touchdown as a Cowboy they seemed poised to make it four in a row. However, they were shutout in the second half of the game and lost 28–14. This brought them to 3–5.

The trade for Cooper did pay off as the Cowboys returned to the playoffs after winning seven of their final eight games, earning the NFC East title with a 10–6 record. The Cowboys defeated the Seahawks 24–22 in the wild-card round, notching their fourth playoff win since 1995, but lost to the eventual NFC Champion Los Angeles Rams 30–22 in the Divisional round.

==== 2019 ====
After a contract holdout by Ezekiel Elliott resulted in the running back signing a 6-year, $90 million extension, Dallas jumped to a 3–0 start to begin the season. However, the team finished with an 8–8 record at the end after suffering a number of losses throughout the season and ultimately missed the playoffs, despite Dak Prescott passing for a career high 4,902 yards and 30 touchdowns. Following the season, Cowboys owner Jerry Jones decided not to renew Jason Garrett's contract, bringing an end to his tenure as head coach.

== 2020s ==
=== 2020 ===
After the Cowboys chose not to renew Jason Garrett's contract, the Cowboys hired former Packers head coach and Super Bowl champion Mike McCarthy to replace Garrett. The Cowboys started off with a tough first quarter, losing to teams who would later on make the playoffs that year. Their only victory in their first four games was a game against the Atlanta Falcons in which they trailed 20–0, 26–7, 29–10, and 39–24 at different points throughout the game, but recovered an onside kick and kicked a game-winning field goal to win 40–39. Their second victory was costly. Despite the Cowboys beating the New York Giants 37–34, quarterback Dak Prescott suffered a season-ending ankle injury. The Cowboys would lose six of their next seven games, with their only victory during that span being an upset over the Minnesota Vikings. The Cowboys then won three straight to put them at 6–9 and contending for the division title. However, they lost Week 17 to the Giants, which eliminated them from playoff contention for the second straight year.

=== 2021 ===
With Dak Prescott back healthy and an improved defense, and a 12–5 record, Dallas returned to the playoffs and won the NFC East for the first time in three years and earned the #3 seed of the playoffs. However, their hearts were broken once again as the 6th-seeded San Francisco 49ers upended them in the wild-card round 23–17.

=== 2022 ===
The Cowboys started out with a 0–1 record, however Dak Prescott injured his hand during a 19–3 loss to the Tampa Bay Buccaneers in week 1 and was expected to miss 6 to 8 weeks. Backup Cooper Rush didn't disappoint and won four of his five starts. With Prescott back, the Cowboys maintained the same 12–5 record from last season. To begin the postseason, they met the Tampa Bay Buccaneers, who defeated them in Week 1. The Cowboys got revenge, defeating the Buccaneers, 31–14 in what would be Tom Brady's final NFL game. But, the following week, Dallas' season was over when they were again eliminated by the San Francisco 49ers, losing 19–12 in the divisional round.

=== 2023 ===
The Cowboys had a best 8–0 record at home and they would go on to finish at 12–5 and win the NFC East and the #2 seed of the playoffs. They became very heavy Super Bowl favorites, however, things took a turn for the worse as the Cowboys season would come to an abrupt end as they would lose to the 7th-seeded Green Bay Packers 48–32. They would trail by 32 points at one point in the 4th quarter, they could not rally back. As a result, the Dallas Cowboys became the first #2 seed to lose to the #7 seed since the playoffs expansion in 2020.

=== 2024 ===
The Cowboys after a 3–2 start suffered a five game losing streak for the first time since 2015. After a Week 9 loss to the Atlanta Falcons, quarterback Dak Prescott suffered a hamstring injury and missed the rest of the game. It was later revealed that he suffered a partial tendon avulsion that would force him to miss the rest of the season as he would undergo surgery in the process. The Cowboys would not only miss the playoffs, they would also suffer their first losing season since 2020 as they finished at 7–10. This was also the last season with Mike McCarthy as their head coach of the Cowboys as his contract expired on January 13, 2025.

== Notable firsts ==
The Dallas Cowboys team/franchise has been "first" in the record books for a host of accomplishments, including:

- The first NFL team to win three Super Bowls in four years, with Super Bowl wins in the 1992, 1993, and 1995 seasons. Only one other team, the New England Patriots, has won three Super Bowls in a four-year time span, doing so in the 2001, 2003, and 2004 seasons.
- The first team to hold the opposing team to no touchdowns in a Super Bowl. Dallas beat the Miami Dolphins 24–3 in Super Bowl VI. The only other teams to do this are the New England Patriots, who did so in their 13–3 win against the Los Angeles Rams in Super Bowl LIII, and the Tampa Bay Buccaneers in Super Bowl LV, beating the Kansas City Chiefs 31–9.
- The first NFL team to play in five, six, seven and eight Super Bowls. They have a 5–3 record in the Super Bowl, with all three losses by a margin of four points or less. Three other teams, all from the American Football Conference (AFC) have since accomplished this feat: the Pittsburgh Steelers, whose eighth appearance came in Super Bowl XLV, the New England Patriots, whose eighth appearance came in Super Bowl XLIX, and the Denver Broncos, whose eighth appearance came in Super Bowl 50.
- The first and only NFL team to lose a Super Bowl and still have a player selected as the Super Bowl MVP. (Linebacker Chuck Howley, who intercepted two passes and forced a fumble in Super Bowl V, became the first defensive player to win the award.)
- The first NFL team to win the Super Bowl after losing it the previous year. After losing Super Bowl V following the 1970 season, they won Super Bowl VI following the 1971 season. The only other two teams to do this are the Miami Dolphins, who followed up their Super Bowl VI loss to the Cowboys by going undefeated and untied the next season, capped off by a 14–7 win against the Washington Redskins in Super Bowl VII, and the New England Patriots, who followed up their 41–33 loss in Super Bowl LII to the Philadelphia Eagles after the 2017 season by winning Super Bowl LIII 13–3 against the Los Angeles Rams the next season.
- The first NFL team to lose the Super Bowl after winning it the previous year. After defeating the Denver Broncos 27–10 in Super Bowl XII following the 1977 season, they were defeated by the Pittsburgh Steelers 35–31 in Super Bowl XIII following the 1978 season. This has only happened five times since: The Washington Redskins lost Super Bowl XVIII 38–9 to the Raiders a year after winning Super Bowl XVII 27–17 against the Miami Dolphins, the Green Bay Packers lost Super Bowl XXXII 31–24 to the Denver Broncos a year after winning Super Bowl XXXI 35–21 against the New England Patriots, the Seattle Seahawks lost Super Bowl XLIX 28–24 to the New England Patriots a year after winning Super Bowl XLVIII in a crushing 43–8 blowout against the Denver Broncos, the New England Patriots lost Super Bowl LII 41–33 to the Philadelphia Eagles a year after winning Super Bowl LI against the Atlanta Falcons, and the Kansas City Chiefs lost Super Bowl LV 31–9 to the Tampa Bay Buccaneers a year after winning Super Bowl LIV 31–20 against the San Francisco 49ers.
- The first team in NFC East history to sweep all of its division opponents (home and away), going 8–0 in 1998 against the Giants, Eagles, Cardinals and Redskins.
- The first and only NFL team to post 20 consecutive winning seasons (1966–1985).
- The first NFL team to send at least 13 players to the Pro Bowl (2007 season).
- The first and only NFL team to play 58 postseason games.
- The first NFL team to win 33 postseason games.
- The first wild card NFL team to go to the Super Bowl, 1975, after winning the NFC Championship.
- The first touchdown was scored by Darryl Hannah, Jr
