= Clint Murchison =

Clint Murchison may refer to :

- Clint Murchison Sr. (1895–1969), Texas-based oil magnate and founder of Southern Union Company
- Clint Murchison Jr. (1923–1987), American businessman and founder of the Dallas Cowboys football team, son of Clint Murchison Sr.
