= Dallas Cowboys Ring of Honor =

Commemorative decoration in AT&T Stadium

Coordinates: 32.74826°N 97.09300°W

The Dallas Cowboys Ring of Honor (RoH) is a ring that currently exists around AT&T Stadium in Arlington, Texas and formerly existed around Texas Stadium in Irving, Texas, which honors former players, coaches and club officials who made outstanding contributions to the Dallas Cowboys football organization. In 1993, Jerry Jones said the Ring of Honor "stands for the men who built this franchise and had it called America's Team."

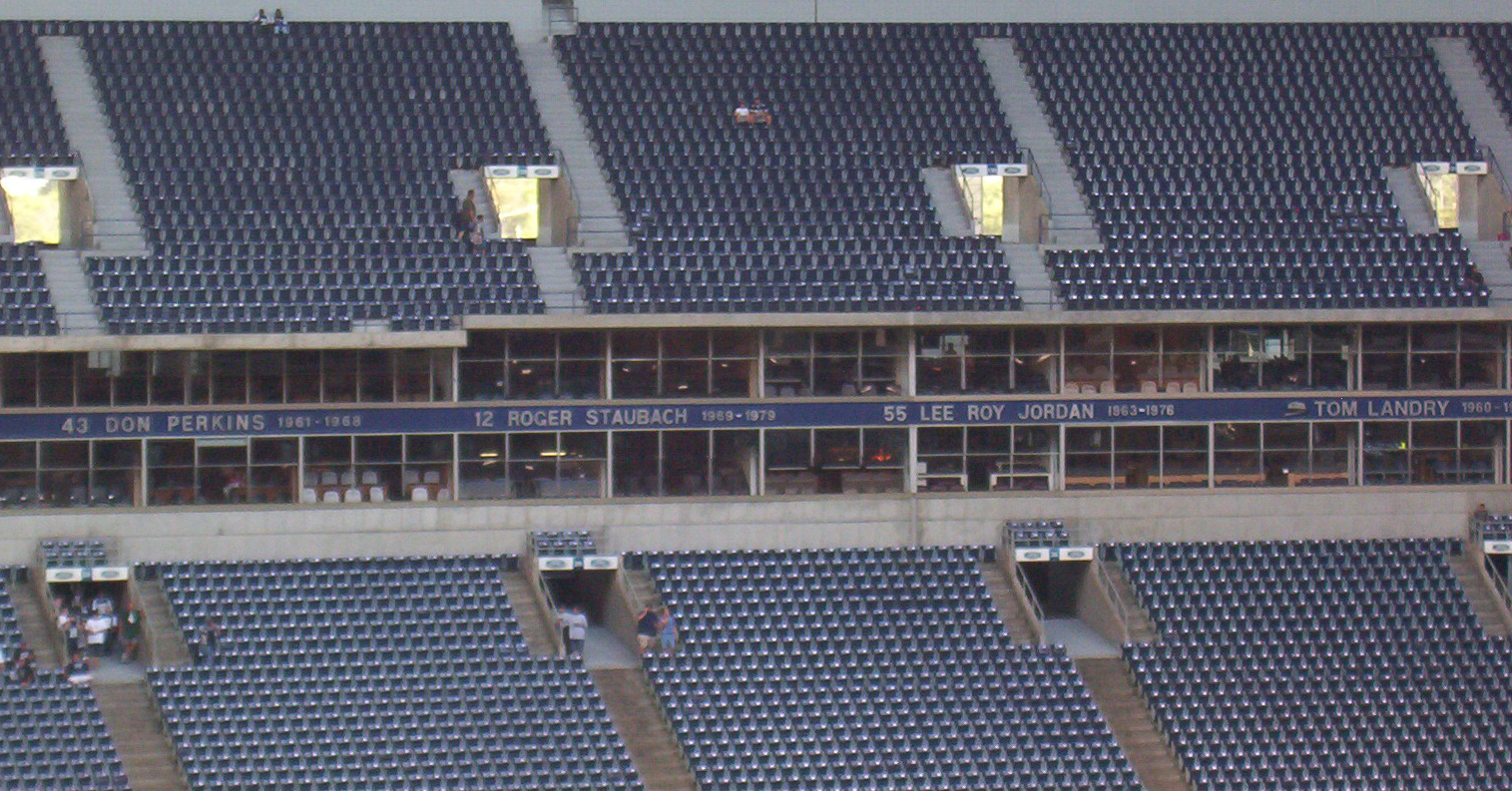
The Ring of Honor at Texas Stadium

The Ring of Honor was created by Tex Schramm and began on November 23, 1975, which was designated in Dallas as Bob Lilly Day. On that day, the team held the first Cowboys reunion and unveiled Lilly's name and jersey number (74) beneath the press box during half time. As the first honoree, Lilly (who had retired from the NFL in July 1975 after 14 years) donned his Cowboy uniform once more and graciously accepted the honor, along with numerous other gifts, which included a car, a gun and a hunting dog. Also present at the event were Cowboys owner Clint Murchison, president/general manager Tex Schramm and Head Coach Tom Landry. As the first inductee, Lilly has the distinction of returning to present each new member into the RoH. Only nine players received the honor during the first three decades of the Cowboys existence, making the RoH a coveted achievement, true to the dream envisioned by Schramm, who became the 12th person selected to the Ring of Honor; the award was given posthumously in October 2003, a few months after he died.

In 2005, three former Cowboys all-stars were simultaneously inducted during half time ceremonies on Monday Night Football. Troy Aikman, Emmitt Smith, and Michael Irvin, known as "The Triplets", were part of the 1990s Three-Time Super Bowl Championship Cowboys team.

Ring of Honor inductees have been chosen by the former president-general manager, Tex Schramm and then by owner Jerry Jones. Schramm set a precedent by placing a high value on the character of the inductees. There was controversy over the selection of Michael Irvin due to his drug charges.

On November 1, 2015 Darren Woodson became the 21st member of the Dallas Cowboys Ring of Honor.

In 2017, the Ring of Honor was extended when the walkway was built with the former players' numbers in front of Ford Center, Cowboys' indoor practice facility.

On November 29, 2018, Gil Brandt became the 22nd member of the Dallas Cowboys Ring of Honor.

On October 29, 2023, DeMarcus Ware became the 23rd member of the Dallas Cowboys Ring of Honor.

On December 30, 2023, Jimmy Johnson became the 24th member of the Dallas Cowboys Ring of Honor.

In total, the Dallas Cowboys Ring of Honor includes 20 players, two executives, and two head coaches.

== Inductees ==
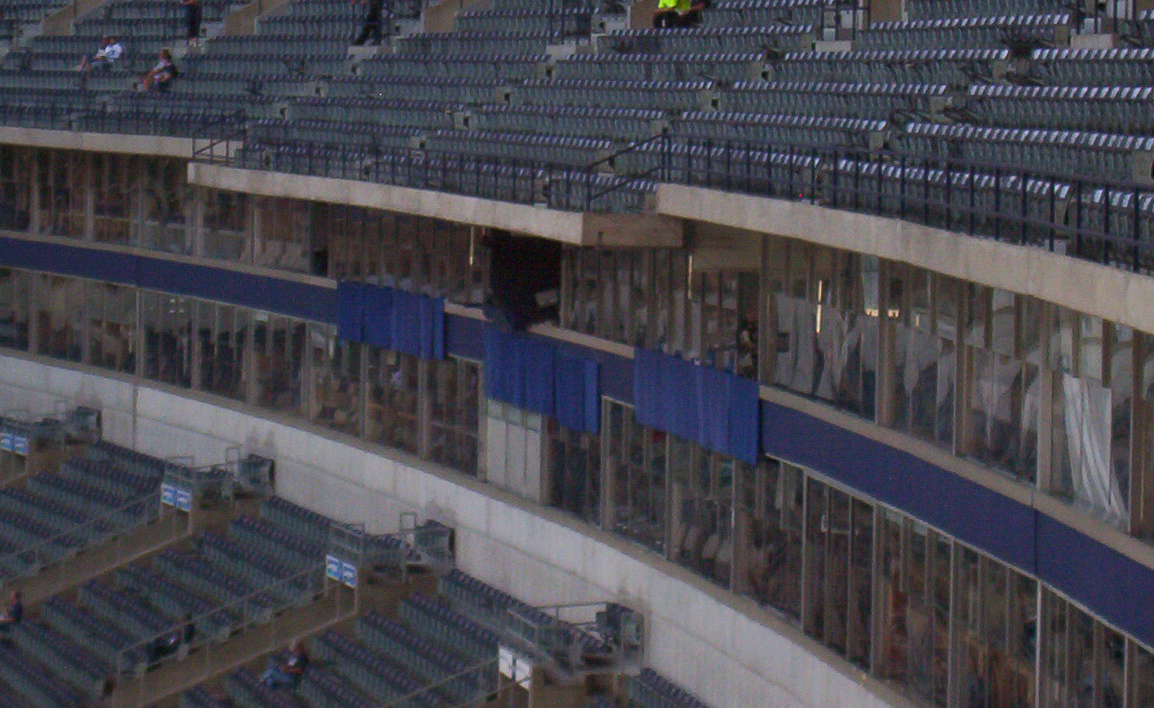
The names of Aikman, Smith and Irvin before being inducted.

Pro Football Hall of Fame finalist
Inducted or Enshrined in the Pro Football Hall of Fame

No.	Name	Position	Years With Club	Inducted
74	Bob Lilly	DT	1961–1974	November 23, 1975
17	Don Meredith	QB	1960–1968	November 7, 1976
43	Don Perkins	FB	1961–1968	November 7, 1976
54	Chuck Howley	LB	1961–1973	October 30, 1977
20	Mel Renfro	CB	1964–1977	October 25, 1981
12	Roger Staubach	QB	1969–1979	October 9, 1983
55	Lee Roy Jordan	LB, C	1963–1976	October 29, 1989
—	Tom Landry	Head Coach	1960–1988	November 7, 1993
33	Tony Dorsett	RB	1977–1987	October 9, 1994
54	Randy White	DT, LB, DE	1975–1988	October 9, 1994
22	Bob Hayes	WR	1965–1974	September 23, 2001
—	Tex Schramm	General Manager	1960–1989	October 12, 2003
43	Cliff Harris	S	1970–1979	October 10, 2004
70	Rayfield Wright	OT	1967–1979	October 10, 2004
8	Troy Aikman	QB	1989–2000	September 19, 2005
88	Michael Irvin	WR	1988–1999	September 19, 2005
22	Emmitt Smith	RB	1990–2002	September 19, 2005
88	Drew Pearson	WR	1973–1983	November 6, 2011
94	Charles Haley	DE	1992–1996	November 6, 2011
73	Larry Allen	OG, OT	1994–2005	November 6, 2011
28	Darren Woodson	S	1992–2004	November 1, 2015
—	Gil Brandt	VP Player Personnel	1960–1988	November 29, 2018
94	DeMarcus Ware	LB	2005–2013	October 29, 2023
—	Jimmy Johnson	Head Coach	1989–1993	December 30, 2023
