= Madeleine Duncan Brown =

Claimed mistress of LBJ (1925–2002)

- Brown in 1982
- Born: Madeleine Frances Duncan; July 5, 1925; Dallas, Texas, U.S.
- Died: June 22, 2002 (aged 76); Dallas, Texas, U.S.
- Spouse: James Glynn Brown (m. 1944; div. 1955)
- Children: Jimmy Glynn Brown; Steven Mark Brown

Madeleine Duncan Brown (July 5, 1925 – June 22, 2002) was an American woman who claimed to be a longtime mistress of United States President Lyndon B. Johnson. In addition to claiming that a son was born out of that relationship, Brown also implicated Johnson in a conspiracy to assassinate President John F. Kennedy.

== Background ==
Brown described her background in her 1997 autobiography, Texas in the Morning: The Love Story of Madeleine Brown and President Lyndon Baines Johnson. According to Brown, she was raised in a middle-class Catholic household in Dallas, Texas, where her father was a utility company supervisor and her mother was a housewife. She stated that she attended W. H. Adamson High School. Brown said at the age of 19 she married James Glynn Brown, a childhood sweetheart and neighborhood soda jerk, whom she divorced in 1955.

She described her husband as a veteran of the United States Marine Corps whose "war experiences had shattered his nerves, and turned him into a hopeless, physically abusive drunkard". Brown said that he "was eventually institutionalized in a veteran's hospital for 'chronic paranoid schizophrenia'". According to Brown, she left her husband in 1948 while he was in the hospital, returning to Dallas with her two-month-old son, Jimmy Glynn Brown. She said that she was subsequently hired that same year by Glenn Advertising and was promoted to media buyer whose responsibilities including purchasing radio advertising time.

== Initial allegations: affair with LBJ ==
On November 5, 1982, Brown spoke at a news conference held at the Dallas Press Club, alleging that she had an extramarital relationship with Johnson for almost twenty years. She said that the affair began in 1948 after a party at the Adolphus Hotel in Dallas and lasted until 1967. The Dallas Morning News also published the allegations under the headline "Dallas Woman Claims She Was LBJ's Lover", noting that spokespeople for Lady Bird Johnson and the Johnson family rejected the claims. Brown's statement, in which she said she wanted to "clear the record", came three weeks after published reports of an affair between Johnson and Alice Glass.

== Paternity suit and subsequent allegations: Child with LBJ ==
=== Paternity suit filed ===
On June 18, 1987, Brown's second son, Steven Mark Brown (December 27, 1950 – September 28, 1990), filed a $10.5 million lawsuit against Lady Bird Johnson in a Texas district court alleging that the former first lady and two friends of President Johnson, Jesse Kellam of Austin and Jerome T. Ragsdale of Dallas, had conspired to deprive him of a share of the Johnson estate. (Note: Jesse "J.C." Kellum, president and general manager of the Johnsons' radio and television interests, was referred to in newspaper reports about the suit as "Jess C. Kellam".) His suit claimed: "My legal birthrights have been violated and a conspiracy was formed to deprive me of my legal heirship." The suit included an affidavit from Madeleine Brown, alleging that she met President Johnson in 1948 at a social function within a Dallas hotel, then had an affair with him that lasted from 1948 until 1969.

According to her affidavit, Ragsdale, a deceased Dallas attorney, was assigned to assist with legal issues regarding her pregnancy and later claimed to be the child's father in order to shield Johnson from negative publicity. Betty Tilson, the press secretary for Lady Bird Johnson, was quoted as stating: "We're convinced the whole thing is made-up, frankly." Tilson indicated that close associates of the Johnson family were not familiar with the name "Steven Mark Brown" nor was there any record of correspondence or visitation from him within the Lyndon Baines Johnson Library and Museum. She also stated that no one she talked to knew Ragsdale.

=== Interview with People magazine ===
The August 5, 1987 issue of People magazine detailed additional claims made by Madeleine and Steven Brown.

In the 1940s, the Johnsons owned a radio station in Austin, KTBC, run by Jesse Kellam. Madeleine Brown claimed that she attended a KTBC reception in 1948 while working for a Dallas advertising agency and was introduced to Johnson through Kellam. She reported that Johnson flirted with her during this initial encounter and that she was "dazzled" by him. According to Brown, Kellam immediately asked her to another reception three weeks later at the Adolphus Hotel.

It was at that meeting, she said, that her long affair with Johnson began after he invited her up to his apartment in the hotel. Brown said that Johnson insisted the affair be kept secret, and she alleged that Kellam functioned as a go-between who arranged for Johnson and her to meet. People magazine reported that she claimed her relationship with Johnson was "purely physical" and had discovered that he had other mistresses. According to Brown, she told Johnson in April 1950 that she was pregnant and he assured her he would provide for her needs.

She claimed that Kellam told her a few days later that she would be contacted by attorney Jerome Ragsdale. Brown alleged that after the birth of Steven in 1950, Ragsdale provided her with "a six-room house for $15,000, complete with a live-in maid", and paid the various charge cards he supplied to her. She said her physician told her that he would note her husband, James Glynn Brown, as the father.

According to Brown, she continued to meet with Johnson throughout the 1950s and 1960s. She told People that for five years, at Kellam's urging, she had a "paper marriage" to a Dallas businessman with whom she never lived. She said that years after they divorced, she was told by a friend that the man had committed suicide. According to Brown, she was on her way to see Johnson in Austin when she heard about the assassination of Kennedy over the radio, then turned around.

She said that a few weeks later Kellam instructed her to meet the new President of the United States in their usual place. Brown told People that her sexual relationship with Johnson abruptly ended in 1967 after she was badly injured in a car accident in which her son, Steven, was at the wheel. She said she had one last meeting with Johnson in 1969 at the Shamrock Hotel in Houston, Texas, in which they had a two-hour discussion which she described as their first "real conversation". Brown said that in 1973 Kellam telephoned her to say that Johnson had died.

Brown stated that she was hospitalized after suffering a heart attack in February 1987 and, expecting to die, called Steven to her bedside in order to confess hiding the true identity of his father from him. According to People, despite the name of his mother's first husband on his birth certificate, Steven had been "wracked by uncertainty" about who was his true father and "had come to suspect a lawyer friend of the family was actually his father". Steven's mother said that she had no love letters from Johnson and that the few people who could corroborate her story were dead.

According to Brown, she came forward with the paternity claim to assist Steven in claiming his inheritance. Discussing the purpose of the lawsuit, Steven said: "In a public forum, sooner or later the truth comes out. That's what's important to me. I want my last name changed to Johnson, the way it ought to be." He maintained that he wanted money from the former first lady in order to provide for two nephews.

Shortly after the interview, entertainment writer Harry Haun said that Brown's claims in People "stirred up such a hornet's nest of book publishers and movie producers that the woman will indeed write a book about". Haun wrote that literary agent Scott Meredith had been enlisted to handle the book and film rights.

=== Paternity suit dismissed ===
In 1989, Steven Brown's suit against Lady Bird Johnson was dismissed after he failed to show in court. He died in 1990, at age 39, from lymphatic cancer.

== Later allegations: LBJ and the assassination of JFK ==
After the paternity claims, Brown made other allegations suggesting that there was a conspiracy to assassinate Kennedy, including the charge that Johnson had foreknowledge of a plot. In 1988, she briefly appeared in investigative columnist Jack Anderson's syndicated program, American Expose: Who Murdered JFK, and said: "In the fall of 1963 I was in the Carousel Club with other advertising people, and Jack Ruby was saying that Lee Harvey Oswald had been in the club and he had been bragging that he had taken a shot at Major General Edwin Walker". Interviews with Brown implicating Johnson also appeared in an episode of A Current Affair in February 1992, and in a 2003 episode of Nigel Turner's documentary The Men Who Killed Kennedy, titled "The Guilty Men."

Brown claimed to have been present at a party in Clint Murchison, Sr.'s Dallas home on the evening prior to the assassination of John F. Kennedy that was attended by Johnson as well as other famous, wealthy, and powerful individuals including, J. Edgar Hoover, Richard Nixon, H. L. Hunt, George Brown, and John McCloy. According to Brown, Johnson had a meeting with several of the men after which he told her: "After tomorrow, those goddamn Kennedys will never embarrass me again. That's no threat. That's a promise."

Brown said that on New Year's Eve 1963, she met with Lyndon Johnson at the Driskill Hotel in Austin, Texas, and that Johnson confirmed the conspiracy to kill Kennedy, insisting that "Texas oil and ... renegade intelligence bastards in Washington" had been responsible. Brown alleged that Johnson did not attempt to stop the assassination because he hated Kennedy and had an intense desire to be President. Brown also said that she witnessed Oswald meeting with Ruby in the Carousel Club prior to the assassination, but did not specify how long before the assassination this meeting had occurred.

In the years following Brown's allegations, her story has received national attention and several conspiracy authors have cited her claims as evidence of a conspiracy in the case of the JFK assassination.

== Allegations challenged ==
In November 2012, The Dallas Morning News published an article by Hugh Aynesworth describing David Perry's efforts to disprove Brown's allegations. Perry, a former insurance investigator turned conspiracy debunker, had placed his investigation of her claims on his website in an article entitled "Texas in the Imagination" the previous month.

According to Perry, he and his wife met Brown at a social function a few years after she made her original allegations as to the JFK assassination but did not find her story to be believable. He said he initially decided to investigate Brown's conspiracy claim of Johnson and other notable individuals attending a party at Murchison's house. Perry pointed to evidence placing key figures outside of Dallas on the evening of November 21, 1963, including Johnson (with Kennedy in Houston and in Fort Worth), Murchison (in East Texas), and Hoover (in Washington, D.C.). He said that while Nixon was in Dallas at that time, a writer for The Dallas Morning News had placed him at a bottlers convention in the downtown area.

Investigating the paternity claims of Brown and her son, Perry found a report of the son's dismissed lawsuit against Lady Bird Johnson in The Dallas Morning News as well as information indicating a prior conviction for Brown on forgery charges. In 1989, Brown was convicted of forging the will of an elderly relative, who had died the previous year, and was sentenced to ten years in prison. The conviction was overturned in 1994 when the appeals court determined she had not personally signed the original will.

In 2012, Perry found documents indicating that Steven Mark Brown had previously filed another paternity lawsuit in 1979 claiming to be an heir to the estate of Jerome Ragsdale, the Dallas attorney who Brown said had claimed to be her son's father in order to shield Johnson from negative publicity. That suit was dismissed due to lack of evidence.
