= Gil Brandt =

American football executive (1932–2023)

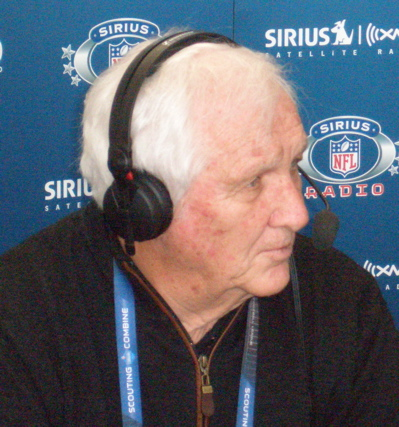
- Brandt in 2009

Personal information
- Born: March 4, 1932; Milwaukee, Wisconsin, U.S.
- Died: August 31, 2023 (aged 91); Dallas, Texas, U.S.

Career information
- High school: North Division (Milwaukee)
- College: Wisconsin

Career history
- Los Angeles Rams (1955–1957); San Francisco 49ers (1958–1959); Dallas Cowboys (1960–1988)

Awards and highlights
- 2× Super Bowl champion (VI, XII); Dallas Cowboys Ring of Honor
- Pro Football Hall of Fame

Gilbert Harvey Brandt (March 5, 1932 – August 31, 2023) was an American professional football executive who was the vice president of player personnel in the National Football League (NFL) for the Dallas Cowboys from 1960 to 1988. He was inducted into the Pro Football Hall of Fame in 2019.

== Early life and college ==
Gilbert Harvey Brandt was born in Milwaukee, Wisconsin, on March 5, 1932. He attended North Division High School where he was a 150-pound starting defensive back. He also lettered in basketball and track.

Brandt enrolled at the University of Wisconsin, but left after two years.

== Professional career ==
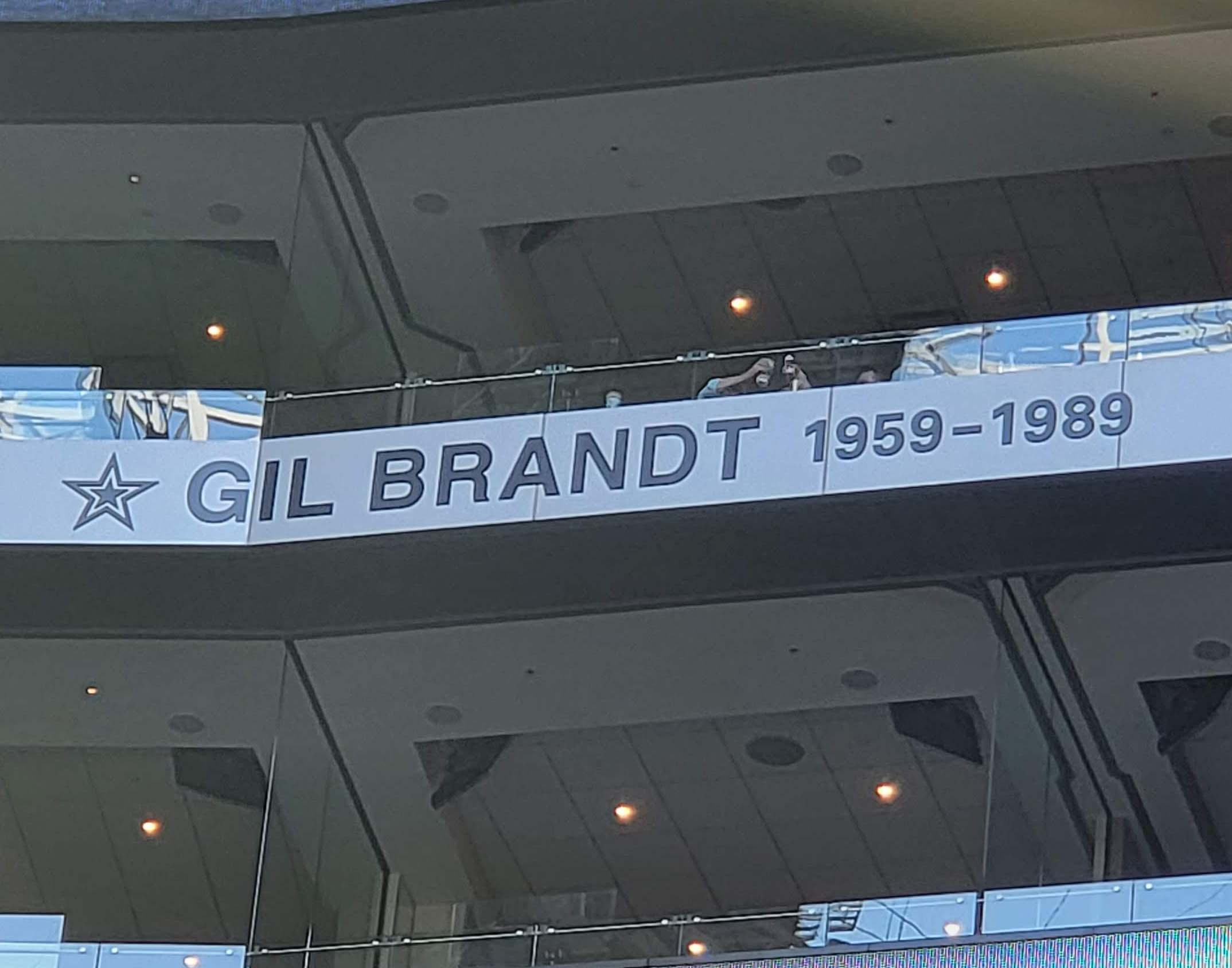
Gil Brandt's name as a member of the Dallas Cowboys Ring of Honor at AT&T Stadium.

Brandt worked as a photographer who specialized in newborn babies and was employed as a part-time scout for the Los Angeles Rams based on a recommendation by Elroy Hirsch. In 1958, he was hired as a full-time scout by the San Francisco 49ers.

Brandt served as the Dallas Cowboys' chief talent scout from the club's inception in 1960. He had served as a part-time scout for the Los Angeles Rams under general manager Tex Schramm in the 1950s. When Schramm took command of the newly formed Dallas franchise in 1960, Brandt was one of the first people he hired. Schramm, Brandt and Coach Tom Landry formed the triumvirate which guided the Cowboys for their first 29 years.

Brandt helped pioneer many of the scouting techniques used by NFL clubs today, such as:

- Creating a new scouting and evaluation system for prospects, which would later spread throughout the NFL. In the NFL Films' documentary series Finding Giants, Ernie Accorsi mentioned how then-general manager George Young built the New York Giants scouting process based on the Cowboys system.
- Using computers for scouting and talent evaluations. To achieve this level of automatization, the Cowboys had to systematically define which were the traits, measurable qualities and skills that could be expressed into numbers and formulas in order for a computer to understand them. Different traits were prioritized for different positions.
- Finding potential prospects in other sports such as: Bob Hayes, Cornell Green, Peter Gent, Toni Fritsch, Percy Howard, Ken Johnson, Ron Howard, Wade Manning, Manny Hendrix, Mac Percival, and Colin Ridgway. The Cowboys also set up hospitality suites for coaches at the NCAA basketball tournaments.
- Brandt was one of the first talent scouts to look outside of the United States and Canada for potential players. Placekicker Fritsch, was discovered during a European scouting tour.
- Made unconventional draft choices in lower rounds based on potential, even though at the time it wasn't known if the players would ever be a part of the National Football League. For example: Roger Staubach, Herschel Walker, and Chad Hennings.
- The use of psychology tests to identify the mental and personality make-up of prospects.
- Finding players in the undrafted free agent and small college talent pool, such as Drew Pearson, Cliff Harris, and Everson Walls.
- Helped to create the NFL Scouting Combine as a centralization of the scouting evaluation process.
- Contributed to introduce Pro Days at schools in 1977.

He also made a reputation of acquiring high draft choices by making impactful trades, which were used to select players like Randy White, Ed "Too Tall" Jones, and Tony Dorsett.

Brandt was fired from the Cowboys on May 2, 1989 by new owner Jerry Jones, ostensibly in a cost-cutting move. Brandt's ouster completed a purge that began with Jones' purchase of the franchise just over nine weeks prior on February 25 and also resulted in Landry's firing and Schramm's resignation.

== Dwayne Haskins comments ==
Following the death of Pittsburgh Steelers quarterback Dwayne Haskins on the morning of April 9, 2022, during an interview on a SiriusXM NFL radio show later that same day, a host asked Brandt for his thoughts. Brandt replied that Haskins was "living to be dead, so to speak," and claimed that draft evaluators had criticized Haskins for his work ethic during his transition from college football to the NFL, stating, "It was always something. It was one of those, 'I'm not offsides, but they keep calling me for offsides.' It's a tragic thing. Anytime somebody dies it's tragic, especially when you're 24 years old and you've got your whole life ahead of you. Maybe if he'd have stayed in school an [extra] year, he wouldn't do silly things."

Brandt's comments generated significant controversy, including from several other current and former NFL players like Haskins's former teammate Cameron Heyward, who called Brandt's comments "disgraceful," and former Dallas Cowboys wide receiver Dez Bryant, who called Brandt's comments "unacceptable." Several called for Brandt to lose his job in NFL radio over the comments. Brandt later apologized for the comments in a statement on Twitter, saying he "reacted carelessly and insensitively" and apologizing for his "poor choice of words."

== Personal life ==
After a few years out of football, Brandt returned as a print analyst and draft expert. He contributed to NFL.com as a senior analyst and was a major contributor in selecting the Playboy All-American football team. Brandt had also been responsible for inviting collegiate players to the NFL draft every year. He was a regular on SiriusXM NFL Radio as a commentator on "Late Hits", "The Endzone", and the "SiriusXM NFL Tailgate Show".

Brandt was inducted into the Texas Sports Hall of Fame on April 9, 2015.

Brandt was announced as the 22nd member of the Cowboys' Ring of Honor on November 2, 2018.

On February 2, 2019, it was announced at the annual NFL Honors Awards that Brandt was elected to the Pro Football Hall of Fame, and his bust was sculpted by Scott Myers.

Gil and Dot Brandt were married on June 28, 1979. They had a son, Brig Mankin Brandt, born August 19, 1980. The marriage lasted nine years.

Brandt and his wife Sara were married for 34 years. He died in Dallas on August 31, 2023, at the age of 91.
