= Chuck Howley =

American football player (born 1936)

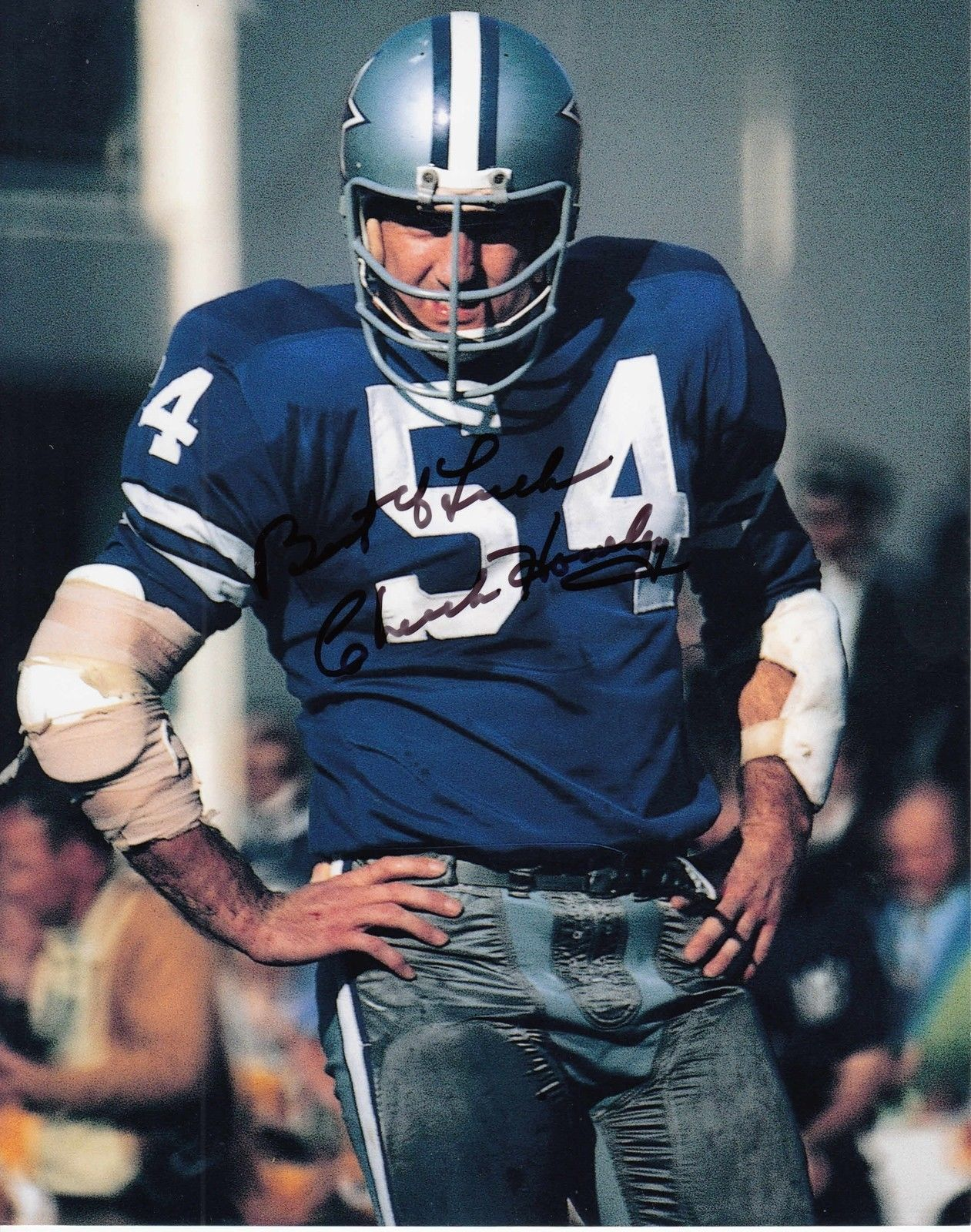
- Signed photo of Howley with the Dallas Cowboys

No. 54
- Position: Linebacker

Personal information
- Born: June 28, 1936 (age 90); Wheeling, West Virginia, U.S.
- Listed height: 6 ft 3 in (1.91 m)
- Listed weight: 228 lb (103 kg)

Career information
- High school: Warwood (Wheeling)
- College: West Virginia (1954–1957)
- NFL draft: 1958: 1st round, 7th overall pick

Career history
- Chicago Bears (1958–1959); Dallas Cowboys (1961–1973)

Awards and highlights
- Super Bowl champion (VI); Super Bowl MVP (V); 5× First-team All-Pro (1966–1970); 2× Second-team All-Pro (1965, 1971); 6× Pro Bowl (1965–1969, 1971); Dallas Cowboys Ring of Honor; 3× All-SoCon (1955–1957); West Virginia Mountaineers No. 66 retired

Career NFL statistics
- Interceptions: 25
- Interception yards: 399
- Fumble recoveries: 18
- Total touchdowns: 3
- Stats at Pro Football Reference
- Pro Football Hall of Fame

Charles Louis Howley (born June 28, 1936) is an American former professional football linebacker who played in the National Football League (NFL) for 15 seasons, primarily with the Dallas Cowboys. He played college football for the West Virginia Mountaineers, earning three consecutive All-SoCon selections. Howley was selected seventh overall in the 1958 NFL draft by the Chicago Bears, where spent his first two seasons, before playing the remainder of his career with the Cowboys.

An original member of the Doomsday Defense, Howley received six Pro Bowl and five first-team All-Pro selections, while appearing in two consecutive Super Bowls and winning Super Bowl VI. Howley was also named MVP of Super Bowl V and is the only player on a losing team to receive the award. He was inducted into the Pro Football Hall of Fame in 2023.

== Early life ==
Howley was born and raised in Wheeling, West Virginia. He initially enrolled at Wheeling Central Catholic High School, before transferring to Warwood High School. He lettered in football, basketball, and baseball. In football, he was first-team all-state and all-OVAC as a senior. As a teenager he also competed in gymnastics. He graduated in 1954.

== College career ==
Howley accepted a football scholarship from West Virginia University in Morgantown to play for the Mountaineers, where he was a three-time All-Southern Conference selection and the conference player of the year in 1957. At WVU, Howley joined the Mu Mu chapter of the Sigma Chi Fraternity.

Howley played guard and center during his three years at varsity, in which the Mountaineers compiled a 21–8–1 record, including a 21–7 victory over Penn State, West Virginia's last until 1984. He played in the East-West Shrine Game and the Senior Bowl, which helped him get noticed by the Chicago Bears. He also was in the College All-Star Game in August 1958, a 35–19 win over the defending champion Detroit Lions.

He is the only athlete in school history to letter in five sports: football, track, wrestling, gymnastics, and swimming. He won the Southern Conference one-meter diving championship.

Howley was inducted into the West Virginia Sports Hall of Fame, the Texas Sports Hall of Fame, the West Virginia University Athletics Hall of Fame, the Ohio Valley Athletic Conference Hall of Fame and the West Virginia University Academy of Distinguished Alumni. On November 4, 2023, West Virginia retired his number 66.

== Professional career ==
=== Chicago Bears ===
Howley was selected seventh overall in the first round of the 1958 NFL draft by the Chicago Bears. He played for two seasons before retiring after what appeared to be a career-ending knee injury he sustained in August 1959, at training camp in Rensselaer, Indiana. He played just three games late in that season and was inactive in 1960. He returned to West Virginia that year to take a job running a gas station, planning to permanently retire from professional football.

Howley decided to make a comeback in 1961 following a West Virginia alumni game. The Bears traded his rights to the Dallas Cowboys in exchange for second (#20-Steve Barnett) and ninth (#118-Monte Day) round draft choices in the 1963 NFL draft.

=== Dallas Cowboys ===
Dallas had gone 0–11–1 in their inaugural season prior to acquiring Howley, but he was still eager to play for the new team. "I went back because I decided there were better things to do than run a gas station," he said. "Also, I thought it would be a unique opportunity to play for Dallas, a team that was just getting started.”

Although Howley started in 1961 and 1962 as a strongside linebacker, in 1963 he switched to weakside linebacker. At the conclusion of the 1963 season, Howley was named to The Sporting News All-East NFL team for the first time. Howley holds the record for the second-most interceptions by a linebacker in a season with six, which he accomplished in 1968.

Howley played with the Cowboys for 165 games over thirteen seasons, in two NFL championship games and two Super Bowls. He was also named most valuable player of Super Bowl V, after intercepting two passes and forcing a fumble in the Cowboys' 16–13 loss to the Colts, making him the first defensive player and non-quarterback to receive the honor. To date, he is also the only player from the losing team to win the award. Howley stated that he did not care about the award, which meant nothing to him since Dallas had lost, and only accepted the honor because it included the awarding of a brand-new station wagon that he could give to his wife as a gift.

The following season, Dallas made it back to Super Bowl VI, and Howley recorded a fumble recovery and a 41-yard interception in the Cowboys 24–3 win over the Miami Dolphins.

During his career, Howley intercepted 25 passes, returning them for 399 yards and two touchdowns. He finished with more than 100 yards in interception returns for both the 1968 and 1971 seasons. He also recovered 18 fumbles, returning them for 191 yards and one touchdown. He is second in Cowboys' history with his 17 fumbles recovered. His 97-yard return of a fumble during a game against the Atlanta Falcons on October 2, 1966, is still the second longest in Cowboys history. He also had a large number of tackles and quarterback sacks, but these statistics were not compiled until after Howley's career ended so his unofficial sack total is 26.5 according to the Dallas Cowboys with a career-high of 5.5 sacks in 1965. Howley was named first-team All-Pro five times in his career, was a six-time Pro Bowler and was named to the All-Eastern Conference team in 1963.

Howley suffered a left knee injury from a crackback block by Charley Taylor in the win over rival Redskins late in the 1972 regular season. He missed the playoffs and retired in June. In 1973, he made a brief return to the team and appeared in one game, before retiring for good. His thirteen seasons for the Cowboys ties him for the second longest tenure in franchise history. In 1977, Howley was inducted into the Ring of Honor at Texas Stadium, the fourth player to receive that honor. He also was inducted into the Texas Sports Hall of Fame.

== Post-career ==
In 2007, he was among the 17 finalists to be seniors candidates for the Pro Football Hall of Fame. On August 17, 2022, he was announced as one of the three finalists nominated by the senior committee for induction in the 2023 Hall of Fame class. On February 9, 2023, Howley was elected to the Pro Football Hall of Fame and was formally enshrined on August 5, with his son Scott delivering a speech on his behalf.

== Personal life ==
Howley married Nancy on June 28, 1958.

Following retirement, he ran a uniform rental business in Dallas. In 1977, Howley founded Happy Hollow Ranch, a cattle and quarter horse operation near Wills Point, Texas.

Howley currently has late-stage dementia.
