= Finding Giants =

2014 television documentary series

- Genre: Documentary
- Created by: NFL Network
- Country of origin: United States
- Original language: English
- No. of seasons: 1
- No. of episodes: 4

Production
- Running time: 30 minutes

Original release
- Network: NFL Network
- Release: September 30 – October 21, 2014

Finding Giants is a documentary series aired on NFL Network that documents the lives of New York Giants scouts, in the quest to find the next NFL star. The show offers, "an in-depth look at scouting and team building in today’s NFL and shows what it takes to find and draft the best players to fit an organization. Finding Giants will also give fans a unique look at the personal side of working in the NFL as scouts and their wives balance life on the road with family life at home." Finding Giants will also show film from inside the New York Giants draft room from the 2014 NFL draft, when they selected; Odell Beckham Jr., Weston Richburg and Andre Williams (American football). It was the last project TV show thought of by NFL Films' Steve Sabol.
