= Bum Bright =

American businessman and philanthropist

- Born: Harvey Roberts Bright; October 6, 1920; Muskogee, Oklahoma, US
- Died: December 11, 2004 (aged 84); Dallas, Texas, US
- Education: Texas A&M University
- Occupation: Businessman

Harvey Roberts "Bum" Bright (October 6, 1920 – December 11, 2004) was an American businessman and philanthropist. He was the owner of the National Football League's Dallas Cowboys from 1984 to 1989.

== Early life ==
Bright received his bachelor's degree in petroleum engineering from Texas A&M University in 1943. After graduating, he was commissioned in the U.S. Army. He was assigned to the Army Corps of Engineers and deployed to Europe during the Second World War. Bright remained in the Army until 1946, obtaining the rank of captain.

== Business ==
Bright returned to Texas in 1946 and began investing in oil and natural gas leases. Later he expanded to trucking, banks, real estate, and savings and loans. His investments made him a millionaire by the age of 31. In 1990, he was listed as one of the 100 richest people in Texas.

== Dallas Cowboys owner ==
On March 19, 1984, Bright (along with 11 limited business partners, including Craig Hall) purchased the Dallas Cowboys NFL franchise from Clint Murchison, Jr. for $85 million. Like Murchison, Bright was a mostly hands-off owner; he largely left the Cowboys in the hands of president and general manager Tex Schramm.

In his first season as owner, the Cowboys finished with a record of 9–7 and missed the playoffs. The following year, the team went 10–6 and made the playoffs, losing to the Los Angeles Rams in the first round. The team's performance declined over the next three seasons, posting records of 7–9, 7–8, and 3–13.

In the late 1980s, Bright suffered massive financial losses, including an estimated $29 million in the 1988 collapse of First Republic Bank Corporation. With most of the rest of his money tied up in the Cowboys, Bright sold the franchise to Jerry Jones in 1989 for $140 million. Jones made many changes to the team, including firing longtime head coach Tom Landry, the only head coach of the team up to that time. Later, Bright claimed that he wanted to fire Landry himself as early as 1987, but Schramm claimed he didn't have a successor in place yet. In 2016, Jones revealed that Bright offered to fire Landry before Jones introduced himself as the Cowboys' new owner. According to Jones, Bright knew Jones would almost certainly be pilloried by the media and fan base if he fired Landry, and wanted to relieve Jones of the pressure by making the decision himself. However, Jones declined the offer, wanting to tell Landry himself that he was being let go.

== Politics ==
An outspoken conservative, Bright was highly critical of John F. Kennedy. In response to President Kennedy's visit to Texas in 1963, Bright co-sponsored a political advertisement in the Dallas Morning News to criticize the president's policies. The full-page ad ran on November 22, 1963, the day that Kennedy was assassinated in Dallas.

He also disapproved of the extent of federal welfare programs. In a 1990 interview with Texas Monthly, he stated, "Our unrestrained welfare programs encourage people to be non-productive, and therefore, hungry and helpless."

== Connection to Texas A&M ==
Bright was known for publicly supporting his alma mater, Texas A&M University, and its athletics programs. After the Texas A&M football team upset the University of Texas in 1967, he had one million matchboxes with the inscription "Tee Hee Hee: Texas A&M 10, Texas 7" printed and distributed throughout the state of Texas.

He was the chairman of Texas A&M University System Board of Regents from 1981 to 1985. In 1991, Texas A&M named him a distinguished alumnus. A&M also presented him with the Sterling C. Evans medal in 2002.

Bright donated an unrestricted contribution of $25 million to Texas A&M in 1997. In 2000, he donated another $5 million to support renovation of the school's football stadium, Kyle Field. Two buildings on Texas A&M's campus bear his name: the Bright Football Complex and the H. R. "Bum" Bright Building.

Sporting positions
Preceded by Clint Murchison Jr.	Dallas Cowboys principal owner 1984–1989	Succeeded by Jerry Jones
