= Clint Murchison Sr. =

American businessman (1895–1969)

- Murchison Sr. in 1954
- Born: Clinton Williams Murchison; April 11, 1895; Tyler, Texas, U.S.
- Died: June 20, 1969 (aged 74); Athens, Texas, U.S.
- Resting place: City Cemetery, Athens, Texas
- Occupation: Businessman
- Known for: Texas oil and gas entrepreneur
- Spouses: Anne Morris; Virginia Long
- Children: John Dabney Murchison; Clinton Williams Murchison Jr. Burk Yarbrough Murchison
- Parent(s): John W. Murchison; Clara Williams

Clinton Williams Murchison (April 11, 1895 – June 20, 1969) was a noted Texas-based oil magnate and political operative. Among his companies was the Southern Union Company. He was also the father of Dallas Cowboys owner and founder Clint Murchison Jr.

== Personal ==
Murchison, the third child of John Weldon and Clara Lee Murchison, was born April 11, 1895, in Tyler, Texas.

During World War I, Murchison served as a first lieutenant in the United States Army. He later joined Sid W. Richardson as lease traders in the Burkburnett oilfield in 1919.

Murchison owned several ranches, one close to Tampico, Mexico, where he hosted the Duke and Duchess of Windsor in 1950.

== Family ==
In 1920, Murchison married Anne Morris from Tyler, Texas, and they had three sons: John Dabney Murchison (September 5, 1921 – June 14, 1979), Clinton Williams Murchison Jr. (September 12, 1923 – March 30, 1987), and Burk Yarbrough Murchison (January 26, 1925 – April 15, 1936). His first wife, Anne Morris Murchison, died in 1926. Murchison married again in 1943 to Virginia Long from Commerce, Texas.

== Business ==
Murchison worked in his father's bank before serving in the United States Army during World War I. In 1919 he joined lifelong friend Sid Richardson as a lease trader in the Burkburnett oil field near Wichita Falls, Texas. He quickly moved into oil exploration and development in North and West Texas. Murchison sold his holdings in 1925 for $5 million.

In 1929 Murchison formed the Southern Union Gas Company which supplied natural gas to Texas, Oklahoma, Arkansas and New Mexico. In 1930 he became one of the earliest developers in the East Texas oil field acquiring extensive leases and building the Tyler Pipe Line to deliver crude oil to a new refinery in Tyler, Texas. Murchison named his new corporation American Liberty Oil Company to express his opposition to government regulation.

In the late 1930s, Murchison began diversifying his investments working with his sons, John Dabney and Clint Jr., who joined the business after World War II. They acquired life insurance companies, banks, bus lines, railroads, publishing firms, heavy industrial building materials companies and other leisure-themed companies. Holdings included New York Central Railroad, BB gun maker Daisy Manufacturing Company, Lionel Trains, Henry Holt Publishing, Field & Stream magazine, Heddon Rod & Reel, and Alleghany Corporation.

In 1945 Murchison formed Delhi Oil Corporation, which became one of the largest integrated independent oil companies in the country. Delhi's Canadian subsidiary developed gas reserves in Western Canada leading Murchison to build the 2,100-mile Trans-Canada Pipe Lines completed in 1958. Delhi Australia developed gas reserves in Australia and Delhi Coastal Transmission transported gas from Texas to Florida. In 1955, Delhi merged with Taylor Oil and Gas Company to form Delhi-Taylor Corporation. Murchison also acquired holdings in the Kirby Petroleum Company.

Murchison was also a cattle rancher with extensive ranches in Mexico and East Texas.

Murchison had good relations with the Haitian dictator François 'Papa Doc' Duvalier. Murchison owned a Haitian flour mill.

== Politics ==
Murchison was an ardent believer in states' rights and constitutional rights. During the early 1930s, he became involved in a fierce battle over oil proration. He was interested in defending and upholding the private enterprise system, particularly for the oil and gas industry. Other political interests included farm legislation, a federal land bank, the milk industry, international trade, the gold system and the fight against Communism.

Murchison and Sid Richardson lobbied Dwight D. Eisenhower to run for President of the United States. Murchison's letter was one of two personally presented to Eisenhower on the day he decided to run. Even though Eisenhower identified as a Republican, Murchison and Richardson were actively involved in the "Democrats for Eisenhower" movement.

Murchison frequently corresponded with Lyndon B. Johnson beginning in 1945. Murchison used his influence to help Johnson win East Texas during the 1948 election and was supportive of Johnson's run for president in 1960.

Prior to the end of World War II, Murchison was concerned with the threat of Russian Communism to world relationships. Through his friendship with J. Edgar Hoover he learned firsthand of Communist tactics to weaken American institutions. He used his influence as a major stockholder of Holt Publishing Company to urge publication of Hoover's book Masters of Deceit. Murchison also supported and defended Senator Joseph McCarthy until it became clear McCarthy was using the issue for his own political advancement.

== Death ==
Murchison was reported to have been ill several years prior to his death. On June 20, 1969, he died at Henderson County Memorial Hospital in Athens, Texas. At the time of his death, Murchison's fortune was estimated to be $500,000,000.

== JFK conspiracy allegations ==
Madeleine Duncan Brown, an advertising executive who previously claimed to have had an extended love affair and a son with President Lyndon B. Johnson, said that she was present at a party in Murchison's Dallas home on the evening prior to the assassination of John F. Kennedy that was attended by Johnson as well as other famous, wealthy, and powerful individuals including J. Edgar Hoover, Richard Nixon, and H. L. Hunt. According to Brown, Johnson had a meeting with several of the men after which he told her: “After tomorrow, those goddamn Kennedys will never embarrass me again. That’s no threat. That’s a promise.” (Note: Brown provided a similar account on A Current Affair stating: "On the day of the assassination, not but a couple of hours prior to the assassination, he said that John Kennedy would never embarrass him again and that wasn't a threat - that was a promise.") Brown's story received national attention and became part of at least a dozen John F. Kennedy assassination conspiracy theories.
