= Tex Schramm =

American football executive (1920–2003)

Profile
- Positions: General manager, president

Personal information
- Born: June 2, 1920; San Gabriel, California, U.S.
- Died: July 15, 2003 (aged 83); Dallas, Texas, U.S.

Career information
- High school: Alhambra (CA)
- College: Texas

Career history
- Los Angeles Rams (1947–1956); Dallas Cowboys (1960–1988)

Awards and highlights
- 2× Super Bowl champion (VI, XII); NFL champion (1951); Dallas Cowboys Ring of Honor
- Military career
- Allegiance: United States
- Branch: U.S. Army Air Forces
- Conflicts: World War II
- Pro Football Hall of Fame

Texas Earnest Schramm Jr. (June 2, 1920 – July 15, 2003) was an American professional football executive who was the original president and general manager of the Dallas Cowboys franchise of the National Football League (NFL). Schramm, usually referred to as "Tex", became the head of the Cowboys when the former expansion team started operations in 1960.

== Early life and career ==
Despite his name, Schramm was not born in Texas, but in San Gabriel, California. Texas was his father's name and where his parents met. Schramm attended Alhambra High School and went to the University of Texas, graduating in 1947 with a bachelor's degree in journalism. At UT he was a member of Phi Kappa Psi fraternity, as was his father. Schramm interrupted his education to serve as an officer in the United States Army Air Forces during World War II.

Before joining the Cowboys, Schramm was part of the Los Angeles Rams from 1947 to 1956. During his tenure, he hired Pete Rozelle as the Rams' public relations director, who would eventually become the Commissioner of the National Football League. They remained close friends after Rozelle became NFL commissioner and Schramm became general manager of the Cowboys (each holding his position for 29 years).

== Dallas Cowboys ==
In late 1959, when it became apparent that the NFL was intent on expanding to Dallas, Schramm told his friends in football that he was interested in running the team. Chicago Bears owner George Halas introduced Schramm to Clint Murchison Jr., who had tried to bring the NFL to Dallas several times in the past. Murchison hired Schramm as the general manager for a potential Dallas team, which became a reality when the league awarded a franchise to the city on January 28, 1960.

In 1960, Schramm hired head coach Tom Landry and chief scout Gil Brandt. By the mid-1960s, the three men had built the Cowboys into an elite team. The Cowboys, despite two consecutive losses to the Green Bay Packers in the NFL Championship Game in 1966 and '67, had 20 consecutive winning seasons, and won the most games of any NFL team of the 1970s. They appeared in five Super Bowls that decade, winning Super Bowls VI and XII, and losing Super Bowls V, X, and XIII by a combined 11 points. The Cowboys became a marquee NFL franchise, their popularity inspiring the nickname "America's Team".

In 1966, Schramm met secretly with American Football League (AFL) founder Lamar Hunt to begin the negotiations that led to the 1970 merger of the NFL and AFL, as well as the first Super Bowl in 1967. Also in 1966, Schramm accepted the NFL's offer to have the Cowboys play on Thanksgiving, a tradition they have maintained every year since.

Schramm was known as the most powerful general manager in the NFL. The Cowboys' owners during his tenure, Murchison (1960–84) and Bum Bright (1984–1988), delegated most of their authority to Schramm, leaving most day-to-day operations in his hands. Schramm represented the Cowboys at league meetings and exercised the team's voting rights, something normally reserved for team owners.

Schramm was one of the hardliners in the 1987 NFLPA Strike. The NFL players union at the time sought a better deal, including free agency rights. Schramm, with other owners, organized the hiring of replacement players while the usual players were on strike, earning a nickname of "the commissioner of replacement football." Schramm cattily said to executive director of the NFLPA, Gene Upshaw, "Gene, here’s what you have to understand: we're the ranchers and you're the cattle, and we can always get more cattle." Schramm was comparatively effective in convincing regular players of the Cowboys to cross the picket line, albeit at the cost of splitting the team; he aggressively used contract clauses as threats to revoke millions of dollars in annuity payments from players who would not return to work. Running back Tony Dorsett, who had previously criticized other team members for breaking the strike, felt he was financially forced to rejoin as well by Schramm's threats. Eventually 21 Cowboys players would break the strike and play with replacement players, a much higher rate than for other teams in the League; the Cowboys went 2-1 during the three strike-affected games. The cost of Schramm's threats to the team's success was high: The Cowboys would only go 8–35 over the next two and a half seasons, not recovering until new ownership took over.

== Innovations ==
Schramm was known for advocating for a number of changes and innovations that helped modernize the NFL. These include instant replay, using computer technology in scouting, multi-color striping of the 20- and 50-yard lines, 30-second clock between plays, extra-wide sideline borders, wind-direction stripes on the goal post uprights, the referee's microphone, headsets in the quarterback's helmet for hearing plays, and hiring Dee Brock to establish the Dallas Cowboys Cheerleaders. While leading the league's Competition Committee, he oversaw rule changes such as using overtime in the regular season, putting the official time on the scoreboard, moving goalposts from the front of the end zone to the back, and protecting quarterbacks through the in-the-grasp rule. Schramm's desire for a more comprehensive scouting combine led to the annual offseason NFL Scouting Combine in Indianapolis. Don Shula said of Schramm, "I truly believe he had as much, or more, to do with the success of professional football as anyone who has ever been connected with the league."

== After the Cowboys ==
Schramm stayed on only briefly with the Cowboys after Jerry Jones purchased the team and fired Tom Landry. He left to become the president of the World League of American Football. Schramm was inducted into the Pro Football Hall of Fame in 1991. Schramm's entry into the Cowboys Ring of Honor took much longer due to strained relations with Jones. Schramm had created the Ring of Honor, and had been a "one-man committee" on inductions. Jones became that "committee" when he took over. Finally in 2003, Jones announced that Schramm would be inducted into the ring during the next football season. Schramm attended the announcement press conference and spoke, but died a few months later and was inducted posthumously.

Schramm married his high school sweetheart, Martha Anne Snowden, in 1941. Martha Schramm died on December 8, 2002. The couple had three daughters.

Preceded by first President	World League of American Football President; 1989–1990	Succeeded by Mike Lynn
