= Clint Murchison Jr. =

American football executive (1923–1987)

- Born: Clinton Williams Murchison Jr. September 12, 1923; Dallas, Texas, U.S.
- Died: March 30, 1987 (aged 63); Dallas, Texas, U.S.
- Resting place: Sparkman-Hillcrest Memorial Park Cemetery, North Dallas
- Education: Duke University, MIT
- Occupation: Businessman
- Known for: Dallas Cowboys
- Board member of: Dallas Cowboys
- Spouses: Jane Katherine Coleman; Anne Ferrell Brandt
- Children: 4
- Parent: Clint Murchison Sr.
- Awards: 2x Super Bowl champion Texas Sports Hall of Fame; Texas Business Hall of Fame; Herbert Hoover Humanitarian Award
- Military career
- Allegiance: United States of America
- Branch: United States Marine Corps

Clinton Williams Murchison Jr. (September 12, 1923 – March 30, 1987) was an American businessman and founder of the Dallas Cowboys football team. A son of Clint Murchison Sr., who made his first fortune in oil exploration and became notorious for exploiting the sale of "hot oil", Clint and his surviving brother inherited their father's wealth and business interests to which Clint Jr. added ventures of his own. These included the establishment of the NFL's Dallas Cowboys franchise, real estate development, construction, home building, restaurants and financing the offshore pirate radio station called Radio Nord.

== Early life ==
Murchison had two brothers, John D. Murchison (1921–1979) and Burk Murchison (1925–1936), who died at age ten from a childhood disease. His mother died when he was two and he was mainly raised by an aunt. He attended school at Lawrenceville School and joined the Marine Corps after Pearl Harbor and went on to become a student at Duke University as part of the Marine Corps V-12 training program where he graduated Phi Beta Kappa in electrical engineering. He received a master's degree in mathematics from Massachusetts Institute of Technology (MIT).

== Business career ==
Following the death of his father Clint Murchison Sr., John and Clint Jr. inherited the wealth that their father had created. They began doing business as the Murchison Brothers in the late 1940s from an office in Dallas, Texas. Their inherited interests included the Daisy Manufacturing Company (manufacturing a BB gun); Field and Stream magazine; Heddon Rod & Reel; Henry Holt and Company (later known as Holt, Rinehart, and Winston); Delhi Oil; Kirby Petroleum and a marine construction company known as Tecon Corporation.

In addition to the Dallas Cowboys, The Murchison Family businesses included Centex Corporation (home builders), Daisy Air Rifles, Field & Stream magazine, the Tony Roma's restaurant chain and real estate developments throughout the U.S.

In the early 1960s the Murchisons were involved in a proxy fight with Allan P. Kirby over control of Alleghany Corporation, a holding company whose interests included New York Central Railroad and Investors Diversified Services, a large mutual fund company. The proxy fight was the largest in corporate history.

== Dallas Cowboys founding owner ==
In 1960, the National Football League approved a franchise for Dallas, and Murchison, along with Bedford Wynne, was awarded the rights to the franchise. A motivating factor in the NFL's decision to award a franchise for Dallas was the establishment of the American Football League (AFL) by Lamar Hunt, another Dallas area businessman. Hunt, in helping create the AFL, established a professional football presence in Dallas, and the NFL realized the urgency with which they needed to address a potential market gain by the upstart league and a loss for the established organization.

For the most part, Murchison was a hands-off owner, delegating a great deal of operational control of the Cowboys to general manager Tex Schramm, head coach Tom Landry and scouting/personnel director Gil Brandt. His general attitude was to hire experts and let them execute the aspect of the business that fell in their expertise. Hence, Schramm oversaw most of the Cowboys day-to-day business matters, and represented the Cowboys at league meetings–a prerogative normally reserved to the owner. Brandt had a free hand in drafting and scouting players, and Landry enjoyed absolute authority over the day-to-day running of the actual team.

Murchison's laissez-faire attitude has been credited by many Cowboys fans as the driving force in the team's 20 consecutive winning seasons from 1966 to 1985 (including five Super Bowl appearances and including two Super Bowl championships). By leaving most football matters in the hands of operations staff, Murchison did not create an atmosphere of second guessing and arguments over player selection or credit for the team's success.

Murchison suggested hiring Landry away from his job as a defensive coach with the New York Giants. “I would love to take one percent credit for Landry,” Schramm said, “but I can't."

As the team floundered through their first few seasons and critics called for Landry's firing, Murchison backed his coach by handing him a 10-year contract.

Murchison enjoyed a reputation as a practical joker. On the eve of the Dallas Cowboys' first Super Bowl he wrote to coach Tom Landry, “Dear Tom: I have taught you all I can. From now on, you're on your own.”

In 1984, an ailing Murchison sold the Dallas Cowboys to an investment syndicate led by Bum Bright, a Dallas area businessman who had a background in banking/financial services and in oil/gas production. Bright in turn sold the Cowboys to Jerry Jones in 1989 following several losing seasons.

Dallas sportswriter Blackie Sherrod attributed the Cowboys' success to two rare possessions of Clint Murchison: a bottomless pocketbook and patience.

In 1963, Dallas suddenly became known as the city that assassinated John F. Kennedy. Murchison's Cowboys, featuring likable players and a winning tradition, paved the way for a new Dallas image.

== Building Texas Stadium ==
The Cowboys played at the Cotton Bowl in Dallas since their inception in 1960. With the team becoming more successful in the mid-1960s, Clint Murchison Jr. wanted a new stadium for the team. Unable to strike a bargain with the City of Dallas, he elected to build a new stadium in Irving, Texas.

Murchison worked with architects to create a revolutionary design for a football-only stadium that would feature a roof that would cover all the seats, but leave an open field to keep the elements as part of the game.

Cowboys Linebacker D.D. Lewis said, “Texas Stadium has a hole in its roof so God can watch His favorite team play.”

Texas Stadium was the first NFL stadium to use seat option bonds to help pay construction costs. The bonds were in denominations of $250. Better seats required the purchase of multiple bonds with the best seats requiring the purchase of four bonds for a total of $1,000. The rest of the financing was provided by Murchison and no taxpayer money was used. “Not one old lady on Social Security is going to have her taxes raised because of this stadium,” Murchison said.

Incorporating a host of first-ever innovations, Murchison became known as the godfather of modern stadium construction. Texas Stadium was the first dedicated football stadium to offer luxury suites. The Circle Suites were available for purchase for $50,000 for the life of the stadium. The suites were an immediate status sensation. Over the years the suites increased in value including one trading hands for a million dollars.

Murchison's luxury suite often played host to famous guests including Willie Nelson, Clint Eastwood, Jerry Jeff Walker, Norman Lear, Burt Reynolds, Henry Kissinger and Lyndon Johnson.

== NFL innovations and legacy ==
Murchison, with his MIT background, understood the potential of using computers in football. The Cowboys became the first team to use computers in talent scouting. The Cowboys used an IBM 360 Model 65 computer.

As part of the agreement to build Texas Stadium in Irving, Texas, Murchison gave up ownership of the stadium and the 95 acres on which it sat in exchange for a 40-year lease. He retained the management rights to the stadium. This became a model for how other NFL teams would operate stadiums.

In 1985, Murchison designed, constructed and financed a 30-acre campus-style headquarters for the Dallas Cowboys called Valley Ranch, located in Irving, Texas. The first of its kind in the NFL, it was originally intended to be part of a 160-acre mixed use development.

He was named a finalist for the 2020 class of the Pro Football Hall of Fame as a contributor, however was not elected.

== Radio Nord ==
Murchison funded radio entrepreneur Gordon McLendon to create a floating commercial (pirate radio) station called Radio Nord aboard the motor vessel Bon Jour, anchored in the Stockholm archipelago. Murchison and McLendon remained in the shadows and allowed Murchison's long-time friend Robert F. Thompson to take credit for actual ownership while day-to-day management was vested in Swedish-Finnish businessman Jack S. Kotschack.

Radio Nord broadcast in Swedish for 16 months, between March 8, 1961, and June 30, 1962. With its mix of popular music, DJ's and news, Radio Nord became very popular. Despite politics and religious issues being banned at the station, it was stopped when the Swedish government introduced new legislation in the spring of 1962, criminalizing the act of buying commercials on the station.

The ship Bon Jour was later renamed Mi Amigo, and after docking for almost a year in Galveston, Texas she sailed for southern England to become Radio Atlanta (McLendon began his radio career in the small town of Atlanta, Texas). The station was not a financial success, and joined forces with the Caroline organization to become the southern station of Radio Caroline. Within a short period of time the "Project Atlanta" people sold out completely to the Caroline group.

== Bankruptcy ==
Murchison ran into financial difficulties as a result of questionable investments and mismanagement and failing health at a time when the real estate market was collapsing, at the same time as a sharp decrease in the price of oil and a rise in interest rates. In February 1985, he had to file for personal bankruptcy protection after three creditors, the Toronto-Dominion Bank, the Kona-Post Corporation and Citicorp, filed a petition to force him into bankruptcy. Lawyers involved in the case called it one of the largest personal bankruptcy cases in United States history.

== Death ==
Murchison fought a rare nerve disease called olivopontocerebellar atrophy and was in a wheelchair in his final years. He died of pneumonia in 1987 at age 63 in Dallas, and is buried at Sparkman-Hillcrest Memorial Park Cemetery in North Dallas.

== Awards and honors ==
- Two-time Super Bowl champion (VI, XII) as owner of the Cowboys
- Texas Business Hall of Fame (1984)
- Herbert Hoover Humanitarian Award (1984)
- Texas Sports Hall of Fame (2010)

Sporting positions
New creation	Dallas Cowboys principal owner 1960–1984	Succeeded by Bum Bright
